= 6th New York Cavalry Regiment =

- Active: December 19, 1861, to July 17, 1865
- Country: United States
- Allegiance: (Union (American Civil War)) Union (New York (state)) New York
- Branch: Union Army
- Type: Cavalry
- Size: 663, (Note: As reported back to Adjutant General Hillhouse upon weapons issue on December 16, 1861) 860 (Note: As reported back to Adjutant General Hillhouse, on December 31, 1862), 663 (Note: As reported back to Adjutant General Sprague, on December 31, 1863)
- Engagements: Siege of Yorktown; Battle of Fair Oaks; Battle of Savage's Station; Battle of Glendale; Battle of Malvern Hill; Battle of Frederick; Battle of South Mountain; Battle of Sharpsburg Turnpike; Battle of Antietam; Affair at Glenmore Farm; Battle of Fredericksburg; Battle of Chancellorsville; Battle of Brandy Station; Battle of Upperville; Battle of Middleburg; Battle of Gettysburg; Battle of Manassas Gap; Battle of Wapping Heights; Battle of Buckland Mills; Battle of Bristoe Station; Battle of Bealton Station; Battle of Mine Run; Battle of the Wilderness; Battle of Spotsylvania Court House; Battle of North Anna; Battle of Yellow Tavern; Battle of Cold Harbor; Battle of Trevilian Station; Second Battle of Ream's Station; Battle of Cedar Creek; Battle of Crooked Run; Third Battle of Winchester; Battle of Fisher's Hill; Battle of Tom's Brook; Battle of Dinwiddie Court House; Battle of Five Forks; Battle of Sailor's Creek; Battle of Appomattox Station; Appomattox Court House

Commanders
- Colonel: Thomas Devin, November 18, 1861, to December 8, 1864
- Colonel: Charles L. Fitzhugh, February 18 to June 17, 1865

The 6th New York Cavalry Regiment, also known as the 6th Regiment New York Volunteer Cavalry and nicknamed the "2nd Ira Harris Guards", was a cavalry regiment of the Union Army during the American Civil War. The majority of its fighting was in Virginia as part of the Army of the Potomac.

== Service ==
The regiment was organized as the 2nd Ira Harris Guard in New York City between September 12 and December 19, 1861, initially under the special authority of the War Department. The regiment was, in fact, at first the protege of Senator Ira Harris, of New York, who had been instrumental in securing the authority for its formation. The recruiting headquarters were at 4 Pine Street, in Manhattan, and the first rendezvous for the command was at Camps Herndon and Scott on Staten Island. Its organization was completed as early as October 24, 1861. The twelve-company regiment was divided into three battalions of four companies each. While training, the regiment was transferred to the state of New York and numbered as the 6th Regiment, New York Volunteer Cavalry on Wednesday, November 20, Thomas Devin, (Note: A New York City native, son of Irish immigrant parents, Devin was a house painter and partner in a paint and varnish company with his brother John for much of his early life, while also serving in the New York State Militia. For more information, see his Wikipedia article here.) captain of a militia cavalry company, had been appointed colonel of the regiment two days earlier and Duncan McVicar lieutenant colonel.

Companies were mustered in as follows: A September 12, B September 27, D September 28, C September 29, E October 3. F and G October 24, H October 28, I November 2, L November 6, K" and M December 19, 1861.

=== Further training at York ===
On Friday, December 20, 1861, the regiment was ordered to York, PA. On Monday, 850 men, 200 horses, of the 6th New York crossed on a barge with some difficulty to Elizabethport, NJ, arriving at 3:00 a.m. Tuesday, Christmas Eve. An hour later, the regiment boarded the cars at the New Jersey Central Railroad (NJCRR) depot and was soon on its way over through northern New Jersey, crossing the Delaware at Easton into Pennsylvania on Christmas Day. The train continued onto Lehigh and Susquehanna Railroad (L&SRR) across the Lehigh River, eventually crossing the Susquehanna River, thence down its west bank for several miles and reached York at 3:00 p.m. on Christmas, 1862 after a 35-hour 250 miles (400 km) trek.

The regiment's new year began with each company receiving a keg of beer followed by a parade through the city ending with a reception. Through January, the regiment was put to work building barracks and stables while drilling and training. Rumors were rife that the command would be disbanded or converted to infantry, much to the disinclination of the men. By Friday, Jan 31, the barracks were complete, and the troopers moved in. At that point, the regiment's time was solely devoted to drills, inspections, guard duty, and learning cavalry tactics. The 6th New York earned a reputation for discipline and orderly conduct seldom enjoyed by a regiment quartered in a city. As February continued, alongside the drills and saber exercise, they were elateed with news of victories at Fort Donelson and Fort Pulaski. The rumors remained, sparked by the lack of enough horses. After an inspection, Brig. Gen. Stoneman, chief of cavalry, reported that the 6th New York Cavalry was an efficient and highly disciplined regiment.

At York, the more the men saw of their now 40-year-old militia-bred colonel (Devin) the better they liked him considering him greatly militarily skill, well-qualified, and while a few other volunteer cavalry colonels were as well-drilled, there were none better. As February turned to March, Devin received orders to bring his command to Perryville, MD in the defenses of Washington attached to Military District of Washington. At the Perryville train depot, it would relieve the 11th U. S. Infantry guarding the large government depot at that point, as well as guarding and caring for thousands of sick horses and mules.

=== Initial deployment ===
In March, Devin received orders to bring his command to the front. The 6th New York regiment was ordered to join the defenses of Washington attached to Military District of Washington. Its post was the train depot in Perryville, MD, where it relieve the 11th U. S. Infantry The post guarded the station and the supply depot there. Among its duties there was guarding and caring for thousands of sick horses and mules.

On Thursday, March 6, at 9.30 a.m. on the 6th, the 1st Battalion decamped and took train for Perryville, the rest of the regiment being under orders to follow for same place. The next day, at 3:00 p.m., the 2nd and 3rd Battalions formed line and marched to the depot. Arriving there two hour later, Company I was detailed to put the 200 horses on board and had quite a lively time of it. Steaming out of York at 7:00 p.m. and arrived at the Philadelphia, Wilmington and Baltimore Railroad's (PW&B) President Street Station in Baltimore at 5:00 a.m. on Friday, March 8.

Due to a thirty-year-old ordinance banning steam engines operating in the city, there was no direct steam rail connection between President Street Station and the Baltimore and Ohio Railroad's (B&O) Camden Station. Rail cars that transferred between the two stations had to be pulled by horses along Pratt Street down ten blocks to the southwest to Camden Yards. At 9:00 a.m., the 6th New York marched down Pratt to the other station. (Note: It in this transfer on April 19, 1861, as the 6th Massachusetts transferred between stations, a mob of anti-war supporters and Southern sympathizers attacked the train cars and blocked the route. When it became apparent that they could travel by horse no further, the four companies, about 240 soldiers, got out of the cars and marched in formation down Pratt Street where they were attacked by the mob and opened fire in response.) Boarding the B&O at Camden at 10:00 a.m., the men started on the way to Perryville, arriving there at 1:30 p.m., and crossed the mouth of the Susquehanna to encamp there at the head of the Chesapeake Bay, opposite Havre de Grace.

While the regiment was at Perryville, Col. Devin visited Washington to plead for horses and orders to be sent to the front. Again, the camp abounded with rumors that the 6th New York would be disbanded, and the troopers remained firm that they would not go as infantry. The regiment suffered from sickness in due to bad water, heavy rains and high winds "... the rain came through every crack in the barracks; the floor resembled a hog-pen; everything was all wet and splashed, uniforms and equipments dripping; every one was nearly dead and heartily sick of the dormant life."

On Monday, March 17, morale improved as each company received ten horses, and all non-commissioned officers drew saddles. On Tuesday, Devin returned to Washington to learn, if possible, the War Department's plans for the regiment. On Friday, March 21, the regiment suffered its first loss when one of the men in Company I died of sickness.

=== The 3rd Battalion deploys for the Peninsula Campaign ===
At the opening of Maj. Gen. McClellan's Army of the Potomac's(AoP) spring Peninsula Campaign, the regiment's 3rd Battalion (Companies B, D, F, and H), under command of Maj. Floyd Clarkson, was detached participate in the operation was assigned to the Companies D and K served unbrigaded in Brig. Gen. Sumner's II Corps. Companies F and H, likewise, served unbrigaded as the cavalry reserve for Brig. Gen. Keyes' IV Corps of the AoP. Through the campaign, the companies scouted and screened their corps during the battles on the peninsula. This battalion remained in garrison on the peninsula at Fort Monroe until they rejoined the regiment after Gettysburg in the summer of July 1863.

=== Devin and the 1st and 2nd Battalions in the Virginia and Maryland campaigns ===
Through the spring and early summer, the 1st and 2nd Battalions remained in the defenses of Washington assigned to duty under Brig. Gen. Sturgis. On Tuesday, July 15, 1862, they were ordered to Warrenton, VA, and were placed in Brig. Gen. Gregg's cavalry brigade under the -command of Maj. Gen. McDowell. (Note: They were part of Gregg's three regiment cavalry brigade and its brigade mates were the 8th Illinois and 8th Pennsylvania cavalry regiments.) They were soon During Pope's Virginia Campaign, the 1st and 2nd Battalions scouted the country south of the Rapidan, and covered the evacuation of Fredericksburg and Aquia Creek. Once Maj. Gen. Pope took command of the Army of Virginia, the AoP reorganized and the regiment left its brigade and was attached to Maj. Gen. Reno's IX Corps of the AoP.

Following the Second Battle of Bull Run defeat and the inconclusive Battle of Chantilly, Gen. Lee's Army of Northern Virginia (ANV) invaded Maryland. McClellan was recalled from his disgrace after the Peninsula to once again command the AoP. As such, McClellan gathered his forces near the capital and began a move to western Maryland. McClellan had organized his army into three wings of which Maj. Gen. Burnside's right wing contained Maj. Gen. Joseph Hooker's I Corps and Reno's IX Corps. (Note: See Maryland campaign.) As a result on Thursday, September 4, the regiment crossed the Potomac and joined IX Corps as it left Washington. The 6th New York scouted the country between Maj. Gen. Sumner's II Corps (Note: This corps contained three divisions, and its veteran elements had a good fighting reputation.) and the right wing, passing through Hyattsville, MD, during its movement on Antietam. During the move, Burnside began tasking the regiment directly while still leaving it administratively part of IX Corps. City. The wing moved north to the Baltimore & Ohio Railroad (B&ORR). Hitting the railway, Burnside's wing turned west and followed the line toward Frederick, MD. As they moved west, Devin and his command dutifully reported various encounters with the Confederates as well as reports from local Unionist citizens. On the following Wednesday morning, September 10, Company E's commander, Capt. William E. Beardsley sent back reports of skirmishing with rebel pickets at Frederick and that a loyal citizen told him parts of Jackson's corps were preparing to leave.

Being the first regiment to enter Frederick, Col. Devin led the two battalions in small scraps with the rearguard of Maj. Gen. D. H. Hill's division of Maj. Gen. MG Jackson's wing on that day and again on Friday, September 12. Two days later, September 14, at the battle of South Mountain, Colonel Devin commanding, the regiment was still under the immediate command of General Burnside during the right wing's seizure of Fox's and Turner's Gaps.

Over the weekend, McCellan shifted Burnside's corps to his left. On Monday, September 16, the regiment had another small battle with the rebels on the Boonesboro-Sharpsburg Turnpike (Battle of Sharpsburg Turnpike). Tuesday morning a squadron of the 6th New York opened the Battle of Antietam when it made contact with Confederate skirmishers east of Antietam Creek. During the Battle of Antietam, the 6th New York screened the AoP's left south of Burnside's position. Beginning began at 7:00 am, the troopers heard a continual roar of musketry and artillery all around them, and the shells falling among them forced a change in position out of fire. A detail from Companies I and M crossed Stone Bridge to see if any Rebels were near the old Stone house. They made skirmished with them before returning with the intelligence. In the afternoon four companies from the regiment were sent on reconnaissance where captured some Confederate cavalry. After sundown, artillery fire continued all night.

=== The 1st and 2nd Battalions post-Antietam ===
On Wednesday, the troopers maintained their position as both armies were burying the dead. That evening, the 6th New York picketed along Antietam Creek. Throughout Thursday, September 19, the men heard heavy artillery fire in the direction of the Potomac on the right wing. The next day, the artillery was heard from beyond the river as Lee had retreated across into Virginia. On Saturday, for the first time in ten days the regiment unsaddled its horses and encamped.

On September 21, Sunday, four companies were sent east of Sharpsburg, to scout the predominantly Unionist Washington and Frederick Counties for Rebel activity. On Tuesday, the 6th New York crossed the Potomac and patrolled through Harper's Ferry noting the damage of Jackson's and A. P. Hill's assault just prior to Antietam. Tuesday evening, they encamped west of the town on Bolivar Heights, guarding its western approach. For the next eight days, the troopers of the 6th New York patrolled from that location. The regiment remained attached to Burnside's IX Corps whose divisions stretched 20 miles (32 km) from Maryland Heights across the Potomac to Hagerstow.

To the astonishment of Washington, McClellan declined to pursue Lee across the Potomac, citing shortages of equipment and the fear of overextending his forces. As a result, the 6th New York Cavalry remained in Virginia near Harper's Ferry and Loudon County. The AoP would remain relatively inactive for the next six weeks. The 6th New York would be involved in numerous patrols and skirmishes in Virginia down the Potomac east throughout Loudon County.

== Affiliations, battle honors, detailed service, and casualties ==
=== Organizational affiliation ===
Attached to:

- Defenses of Washington, Military District of Washington, (8 Companies) till July 23, 1862
  - Comapniesd and K detached to II Corps, Army of the Potomac (AoP), March 1862, to July 1863
  - Companies F and H detached to IV Corps, AoP, March 1862, to August, 1863
  - Companies F and H detached to Defenses of Washington, XXII Corps, to October, 1863
- Gregg's 2nd Brigade, Stoneman's Cavalry Division, AoP, to August, 1862
- IX Corps, AoP, August to December, 1862
- 2nd Brigade, Pleasanton's Cavalry Division, AoP, to February, 1863
- 2nd Brigade, 1st Division, Cavalry Corps, AoP
- 2nd Brigade, 1st Division, Cavalry Corps, Army of the Shenandoah (AoS), Middle Military Division, to

July, 1865

  - Company A detached to VI Corps, AoP, September, 1862
  - Companies B and C detached to IX Corps, AoP, January and February, 1863
  - Company A detached to Defenses of Washington, XXII Corps July and August, 1863

=== List of battles ===
The official list of battles in which the regiment bore a part:

- Siege of Yorktown
- Battle of Fair Oaks
- Battle of Savage's Station
- Battle of Glendale
- Battle of Malvern Hill
- Battle of Frederick
- Battle of South Mountain
- Battle of Sharpsburg Turnpike
- Battle of Antietam
- Affair at Glenmore Farm
- Battle of Fredericksburg
- Battle of Chancellorsville
- Battle of Brandy Station
- Battle of Upperville
- Battle of Middleburg
- Battle of Gettysburg
- Battle of Manassas Gap
- Battle of Wapping Heights
- Battle of Buckland Mills
- Battle of Bristoe Station
- Battle of Bealton Station
- Battle of Mine Run
- Battle of the Wilderness
- Battle of Spotsylvania Court House
- Battle of North Anna
- Battle of Yellow Tavern
- Battle of Cold Harbor
- Battle of Trevilian Station
- Second Battle of Ream's Station
- Battle of Cedar Creek
- Battle of Crooked Run
- Third Battle of Winchester
- Battle of Fisher's Hill
- Battle of Tom's Brook
- Battle of Dinwiddie Court House
- Battle of Five Forks
- Battle of Sailor's Creek
- Battle of Appomattox Station
- Appomattox Court House

=== Detailed service ===
The 6th New York Volunteer Cavalry's detailed service is as follows (NOTE — Battles are Bolded, Italicized; campaigns are Italicized):

==== 1861 ====
- Duty in the Defences of Washington (8 Cos.) till July 23, 1862.

==== 1862 ====
- Siege of Yorktown, Va., April 5-May 4 (Cos. "D" and "K").
- Battle of Williamsburg May 5 (Cos. "D" and "K").
- Battle of Seven Pines May 31-June 1 (Co. "K").
- Seven Days Battles before Richmond June 25-July 1 (Cos. "D," "F," "H," "K").
  - Battle of Savage's Station June 29.
  - Battle of Glendale June 30.
  - Battle of Malvern Hill July 1.
- Regiment moved to Warrenton, Va., July 23–26.
- Scout and outpost duty on the Rapidan and Rappahannock Rivers at Barnett's Ford, Va., July and August.
- Orange Court House August 14.
- Culpeper Road August 19.
- Barnett's Ford August 26.
- Kelly's Ford August 30.
- Williamsburg September 9.
- Near Hyattstown September 9–10.
- Frederick City September 12.
- South Mountain September 14.
- Battle of Antietam September 16–17.
- Picketing along the Potomac east of Antietam Creek, September 18–22
- Across the Potomac through Harper's Ferry and encampment on Bolivar Heaights, September 23-October 2.
- Lovettsville October 3.
- Reconnaissance to Smithville, October 16–17.
- Kearneysville October 16.
- Charlestown October 16–17.
- Near Lovettsville October 21.
- Near Wheatland October 21.
- Snickersville October 22.
- Union and Bloomfield November 2–3.
- Ashby's Gap November 3.
- Upperville November 3.
- Waterloo Bridge November 7.
- Ellis Ford December 1.
- Battle of Fredericksburg December 12–15.
- Roconnaissance from Yorktown December 11–15 (Detachment).
- Matthews County Court House December 12.
- Buena Vista December 13.
- Wood's Cross Roads December 14.

==== 1863 ====
- Expedition from Yorktown to West Point and White House (Detachment) January 7–9, 1863 .
- Pamunkey River January 8. Expedition to Gloucester Court House (Detachment) April 7.
- Fort Magruder (Detachment). April 11
- Chancellorsville Campaign April 27-May 6.
  - Germania and Richard's Fords April 29.
  - Crook's Run April 29.
  - Spotsylvania Court House April 30.
- Battle of Chancellorsville May 1–5.
- West Point (Detachment) May 7.
- Gettysburg campaign June 3–July 24
  - Warwick River June 5.
  - Brandy Station and Beverly Ford June 9.
  - Upperville June 21.
  - Middleburg June 22.
  - Haymarket June 24–25.
  - Dix's Peninsula Campaign (3rd Battalion) June 24-July 7.
    - Expedition from White House to Bottom's Bridge (3rd Battalion) July 1–7.
    - Crump's or Baltimore Cross Roads (3rd Battalion) July 2.
  - Battle of Gettysburg, Pa., July 1–3.
  - Williamsport July 6.
  - Battle of Boonsboro July 8.
  - Benovola or Beaver Creek, Md., July 9.
  - Battle of Funkstown July 10–13.
  - Falling Waters July 14.
  - Manassas Gap July 21–22.
  - Battle of Manassas Gap July 23.
- Barbee's Crossroads July 25.
- Kelly's Ford July 31-August 1.
- Brandy Station August 1–3.
- Advance from the Rappahannock to the Rapidan September 13–17.
- Culpeper Court House September 13.
- Raccoon Ford September 14–15 and 19.
- Reconnaissance across the Rapidan September 21–23.
- Jack's Shop, Madison Court House, September 22.
- Bristoe Campaign October 9–22.
  - Raccoon and Morton's Fords October 10.
  - Kelly's Ford and Stevensburg October 11.
  - Brandy Station or Fleetwood October 12.
  - Battle of Bristoe Station October 14.
  - Oak Hill October 15.
  - Culpeper October 17–18.
- Bealeton October 24–26.
- Advance to line of the Rappahannock November 7–8.
- Muddy Run November 8.
- Battle of Mine Run November 26-December 2.
- Parker's Store November 29.

==== 1864 ====
- Demonstration on the Rapidan February 6–7, 1864.
- Barnett's Ford February 6–7.
- Kilpatrick's Raid on Richmond February 28-March 4.
  - Near Taylorstown, Beaver Dam Station, Frederick's Hall and South Anna Bridge February 29.
  - Defences of Richmond March 1.
  - Aylett's March 2.
  - Kings and Queens Court House March 3.
- Carrollton's Store March 11.
- Overland Campaign May–June.
  - Battle of the Wilderness May 5–7.
  - Brock Road and The Furnaces May 6.
  - Battle of Todd's Tavern May 7–8.
  - Battle of Spotsylvania Court House May 8.
  - Sheridan's Raid to James River May 9–24.
  - North Anna May 9–10.
  - Ground Squirrel Church and Battle of Yellow Tavern May 11.
  - Fortifications of Richmond and Meadow Bridge May 12.
  - Jones' Bridge May 17.
  - On line of the Pamunkey May 26–28.
  - Crump's Creek and Hanovertown May 27.
  - Battle of Haw's Shop May 28.
  - Battle of Totopotomoy Creek May 28–31.
  - Battle of Old Church May 30.
  - Battle of Cold Harbor May 31-June 6.
  - Bethesda Church May 31-June 1.
  - Sheridan's Trevillian Raid June 7–24.
  - Battle of Trevilian Station June 11–12.
  - Newark or Mallory's Cross Roads June 12.
- Siege of Petersburg June 15, 1864 – April 2, 1865
  - White House or St. Peter's Church June 21.
  - Black Creek or Tunstall's Station June 21.
  - Jones' Bridge June 23.
  - Charles City Court House June 23.
  - Before Petersburg June 26-July 30.
  - First Battle of Deep Bottom July 27–28.
- Sheridan's Shenandoah Valley Campaign August 7-November 28.
  - Berryville August 10 and 13.
  - Toll Gate near White Post and Newtown August 11.
  - Front Royal August 11.
  - Cedar Creek August 12.
  - Cedarville, Guard Hill or Front Royal and Crooked Run August 16.
  - Charlestown August 21.
  - Kearneyville and near Shephardstown August 25.
  - Leetown and Smithfield August 28.
  - Smithfield Crossing Opequan August 29.
  - Battle of Berryville September 3.
  - Bunker Hill September 13.
  - Sevier's Ford, Opequan Creek, September 15.
  - Third Battle of Winchester September 19.
  - Middletown and Strasburg September 20.
  - Battle of Fisher's Hill September 21.
  - Near Edenburg September 23.
  - Mt. Jackson September 23–24.
  - New Market September 24.
  - Port Republic September 26–27.
  - Waynesboro September 29.
  - Mt. Crawford October 2.
  - Battle of Tom's Brook, "Woodstock Races" October 8–9.
  - Hupp's Hill near Strasburg October 14.
  - Battle of Cedar Creek October 19.
  - Woodstock October 20.
  - Near Kernstown November 11.
  - Newtown November 12.
  - Hood's Hill November 22.
- Expedition from Winchester into Faquier and Loudoun Counties November 28-December 3.
- Expedition to Gordonsville December 19–28.
- Jack's Shop near Gordonsville December 23.

==== 1865 ====
- Siege of Petersburg June 15, 1864 – April 2, 1865
  - Levettsville January 18, 1865.
  - Sheridan's Raid from Winchester February 27-March 25.
  - Waynesboro March 2.
  - Occupation of Staunton March 2.
  - Charlottesville March 3.
  - Goochland Court House March 11.
- Appomattox Campaign March 28-April 9.
  - Battle of Dinwiddie Court House 30-31.
  - Battle of Five Forks April 1.
  - Fall of Petersburg April 2.
  - Scott's Cross Roads April 2.
  - Deep Creek April 3.
  - Tabernacle Church or Beaver Pond Creek April 4.
  - Battle of Sailor's Creek April 6.
  - Appomattox Station April 8.
  - Appomattox Court House April 9.
  - Surrender of Lee and his army.
- Expedition to Danville April 23–29.
- Moved to Washington, D. C., May.
- Grand Review May 23.
- The regiment was consolidated with the 15th New York Cavalry on June 17 to form the 2nd New York Provisional Cavalry Regiment.

=== Casualties and losses ===
Regiment lost during service 9 Officers and 72 Enlisted men killed and mortally wounded and 133 Enlisted men by disease. Total 214.

== Armament/Equipment/Uniform ==
=== Armament ===
Troopers in the 6th New York were initially armed with a mix of Model 1840 Cavalry Saber Model 1860 Light Cavalry Saber, and one Colt .44 "Army" pistol. Although not yet reported back to the Adjutant General, on Saturday, September 6, 1862, the regiment received the Sharps Carbine, and each trooper received one by the time of the 4th quarter 1862 ordnance survey. This continued as standard armament until the spring of 1864 when troopers began turning in their Sharps carbines for new Spencer carbines.

==== Quarterly Ordnance surveys ====
The regiment reported the following issued weapons on quarterly ordnance surveys: 4th Quarter 1862

- A — 74 Sharps Carbines, (.52 Cal.); 84 Colt Army Model 1848 & 1860, (.44 Cal.); 79 Model 1840 Cavalry Saber
- C — 41 Sharps Carbines, (.52 Cal.); 41 Colt Army Model 1848 & 1860, (.44 Cal.); 41 Model 1860 Light Cavalry Saber
- E — 48 Sharps Carbines, (.52 Cal.); 66 Colt Army Model 1848 & 1860, (.44 Cal.); 77 Model 1860 Light Cavalry Saber
- F — 46 Sharps Carbines, (.52 Cal.); 57 Colt Army Model 1848 & 1860, (.44 Cal.); 59 Model 1840 Cavalry Saber
- H — 50 Sharps Carbines, (.52 Cal.); 54 Colt Army Model 1848 & 1860, (.44 Cal.); 54 Model 1860 Light Cavalry Saber
- I — 79 Sharps Carbines, (.52 Cal.); 91 Colt Army Model 1848 & 1860, (.44 Cal.); 98 Model 1840 Cavalry Saber
- Companies B, D, G, K, L, and M missing quarterly ordnance reports

1st Quarter 1863

- A — 67 Sharps Carbines, (.52 Cal.); 75 Colt Army Model 1848 & 1860, (.44 Cal.); 73 Model 1840 Cavalry Saber
- B — 65 Sharps Carbines, (.52 Cal.); 72 Colt Army Model 1848 & 1860, (.44 Cal.); 72 Model 1860 Light Cavalry Saber
- C — 35 Sharps Carbines, (.52 Cal.); 37 Colt Army Model 1848 & 1860, (.44 Cal.); 42 Model 1860 Light Cavalry Saber
- D — 42 Colt Army Model 1848 & 1860, (.44 Cal.); 53 Model 1840 Cavalry Saber
- E — 45 Sharps Carbines, (.52 Cal.); 63 Colt Army Model 1848 & 1860, (.44 Cal.); 73 Model 1860 Light Cavalry Saber
- F — 47 Sharps Carbines, (.52 Cal.); 57 Colt Army Model 1848 & 1860, (.44 Cal.); 59 Model 1840 Cavalry Saber
- G — 46 Sharps Carbines, (.52 Cal.); 44 Colt Army Model 1848 & 1860, (.44 Cal.); 38 Model 1840 Cavalry Saber
- H — 50 Sharps Carbines, (.52 Cal.); 53 Colt Army Model 1848 & 1860, (.44 Cal.); 54 Model 1860 Light Cavalry Saber
- K — 36 Colt Army Model 1848 & 1860, (.44 Cal.); 44 Model 1840 Cavalry Saber
- Companies I, L, and M missing quarterly ordnance reports

2nd Quarter 1863

- A — 35 Sharps Carbines, (.52 Cal.); 51 Colt Army Model 1848 & 1860, (.44 Cal.); 49 Model 1840 Cavalry Saber
- B — 46 Sharps Carbines, (.52 Cal.); 51 Colt Army Model 1848 & 1860, (.44 Cal.); 65 Model 1840 Cavalry Saber
- E — 29 Sharps Carbines, (.52 Cal.); 47 Colt Army Model 1848 & 1860, (.44 Cal.); 29 Model 1860 Light Cavalry Saber
- F — 47 Sharps Carbines, (.52 Cal.); 57 Colt Army Model 1848 & 1860, (.44 Cal.); 59 Model 1840 Cavalry Saber
- G — 46 Sharps Carbines, (.52 Cal.); 44 Colt Army Model 1848 & 1860, (.44 Cal.); 38 Model 1840 Cavalry Saber
- H — 50 Sharps Carbines, (.52 Cal.); 53 Colt Army Model 1848 & 1860, (.44 Cal.); 54 Model 1860 Light Cavalry Saber
- K — 36 Colt Army Model 1848 & 1860, (.44 Cal.); 44 Model 1840 Cavalry Saber
- Companies C, D, I, L, and M missing quarterly ordnance reports

2nd Quarter 1864

- A — 11 Sharps Carbines, (.52 Cal.); 51 Colt Army Model 1848 & 1860, (.44 Cal.); 49 Model 1840 Cavalry Saber
- B — 5 Sharps Carbines, (.52 Cal.); 47 Colt Army Model 1848 & 1860, (.44 Cal.); 29 Model 1860 Light Cavalry Saber
- C — 18 Sharps Carbines, (.52 Cal.); 51 Colt Army Model 1848 & 1860, (.44 Cal.); 49 Model 1840 Cavalry Saber
- D — 15 Sharps Carbines, (.52 Cal.); 47 Colt Army Model 1848 & 1860, (.44 Cal.); 29 Model 1860 Light Cavalry Saber
- E — 16 Sharps Carbines, (.52 Cal.); 51 Colt Army Model 1848 & 1860, (.44 Cal.); 49 Model 1840 Cavalry Saber
- F — 29 Sharps Carbines, (.52 Cal.); 47 Colt Army Model 1848 & 1860, (.44 Cal.); 29 Model 1860 Light Cavalry Saber
- G — 46 Sharps Carbines, (.52 Cal.); 44 Colt Army Model 1848 & 1860, (.44 Cal.); 38 Model 1840 Cavalry Saber
- H — 50 Sharps Carbines, (.52 Cal.); 53 Colt Army Model 1848 & 1860, (.44 Cal.); 54 Model 1860 Light Cavalry Saber
- I — 46 Sharps Carbines, (.52 Cal.); 44 Colt Army Model 1848 & 1860, (.44 Cal.); 38 Model 1840 Cavalry Saber
- K — 50 Sharps Carbines, (.52 Cal.); 53 Colt Army Model 1848 & 1860, (.44 Cal.); 54 Model 1860 Light Cavalry Saber
- L — 50 Sharps Carbines, (.52 Cal.); 53 Colt Army Model 1848 & 1860, (.44 Cal.); 54 Model 1860 Light Cavalry Saber
- M — 50 Sharps Carbines, (.52 Cal.); 53 Colt Army Model 1848 & 1860, (.44 Cal.); 54 Model 1860 Light Cavalry Saber

==== Sabers ====
Issued weapons

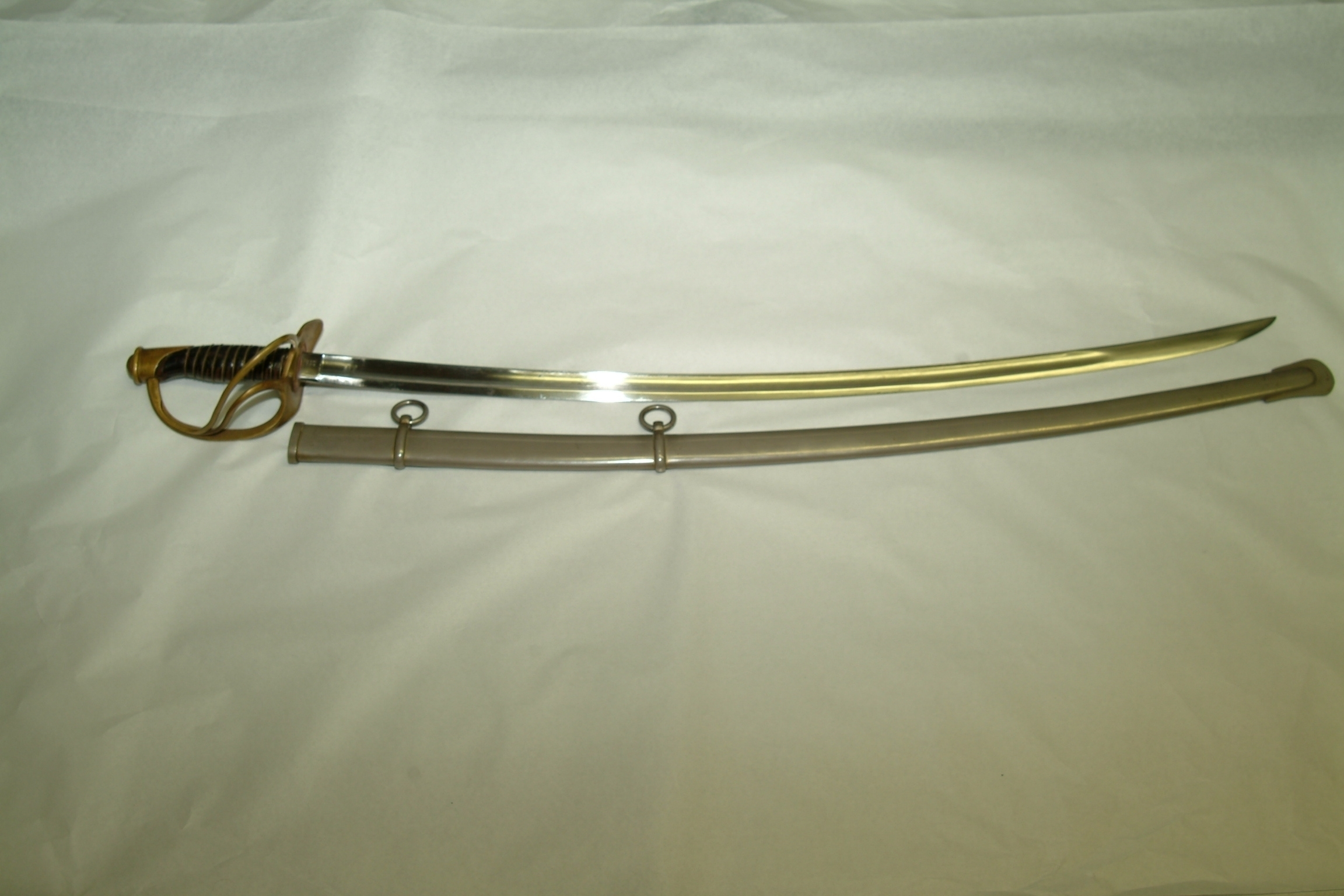
Model 1860 Light Cavalry Saber

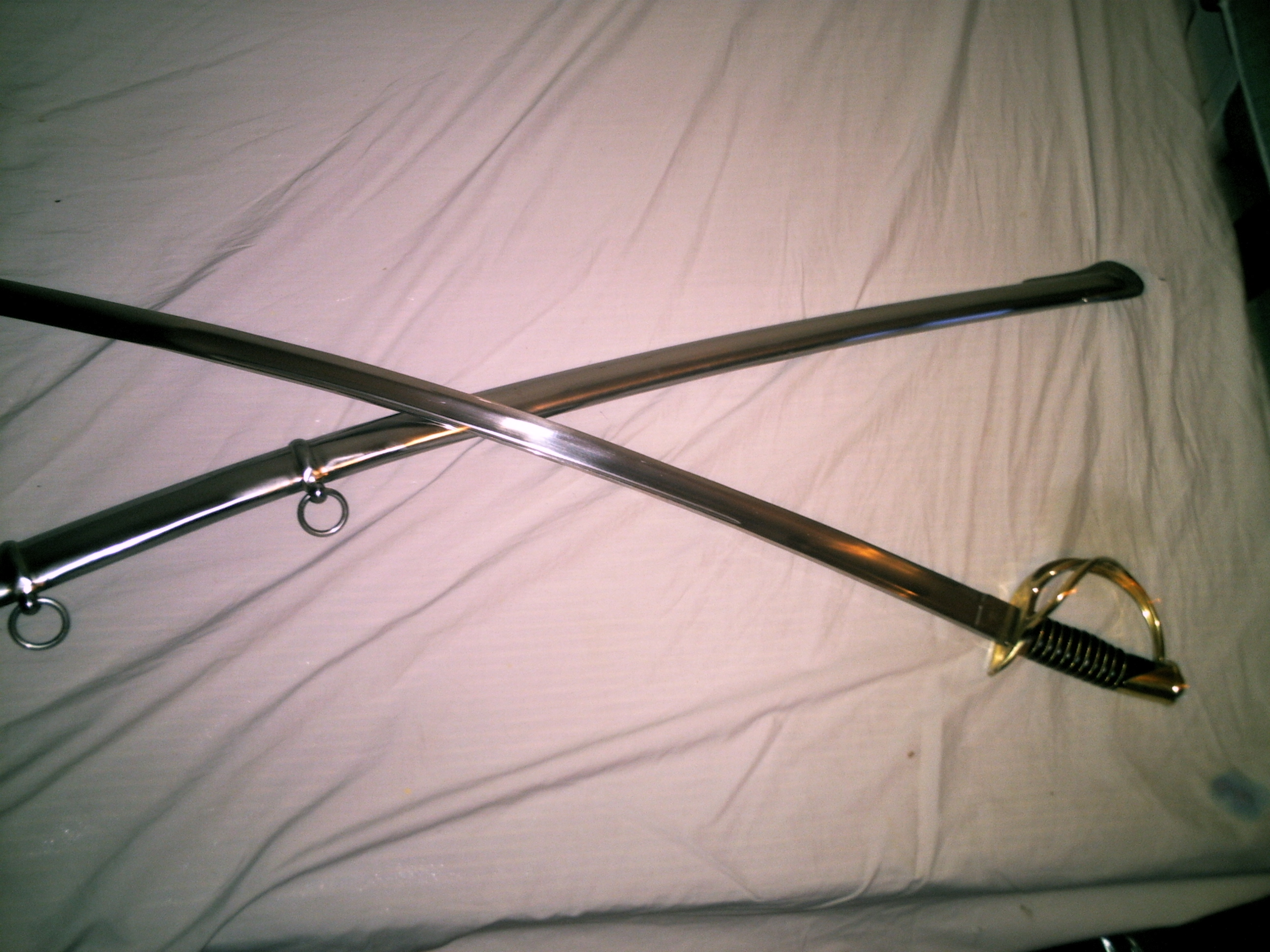
"Old Wristbreaker," Model 1840 Cavalry Saber

==== Pistols ====
Issued weapons

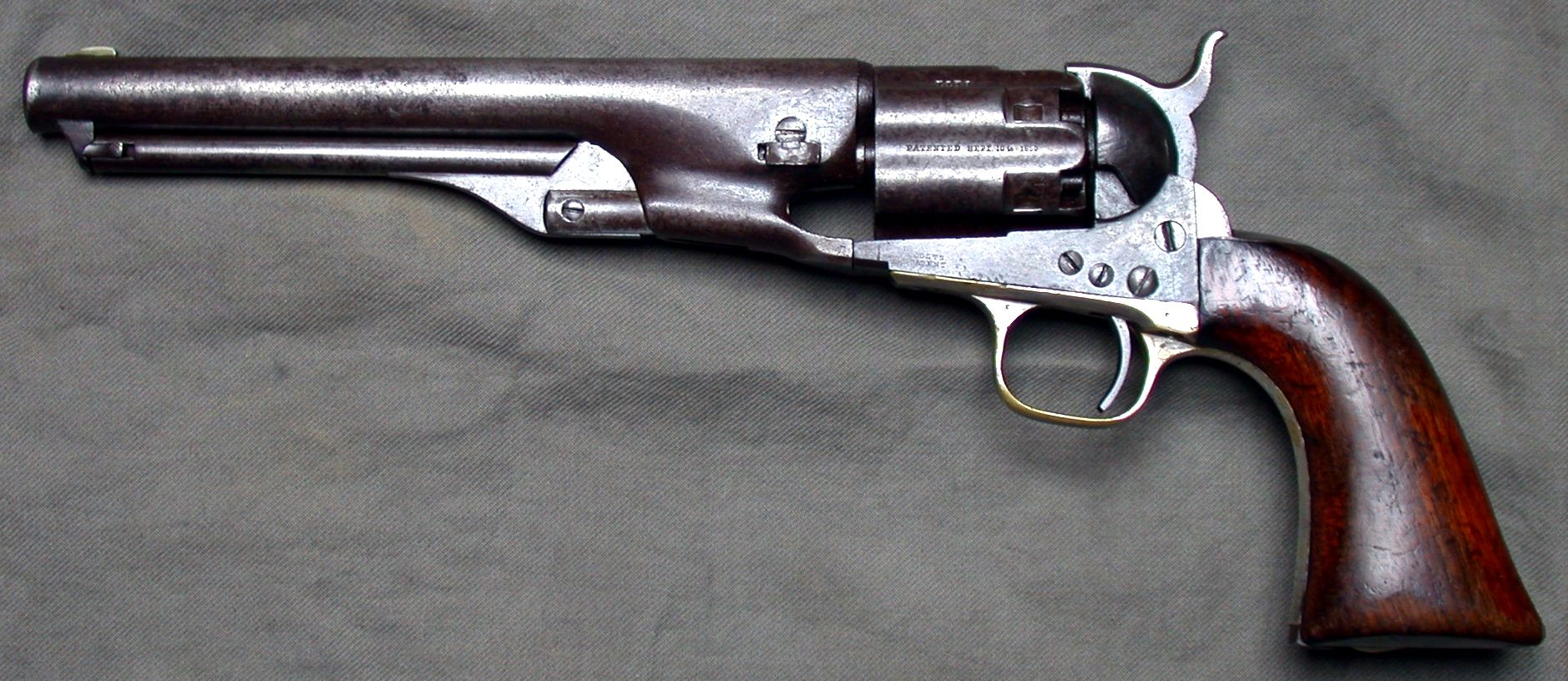
Colt Army 1860

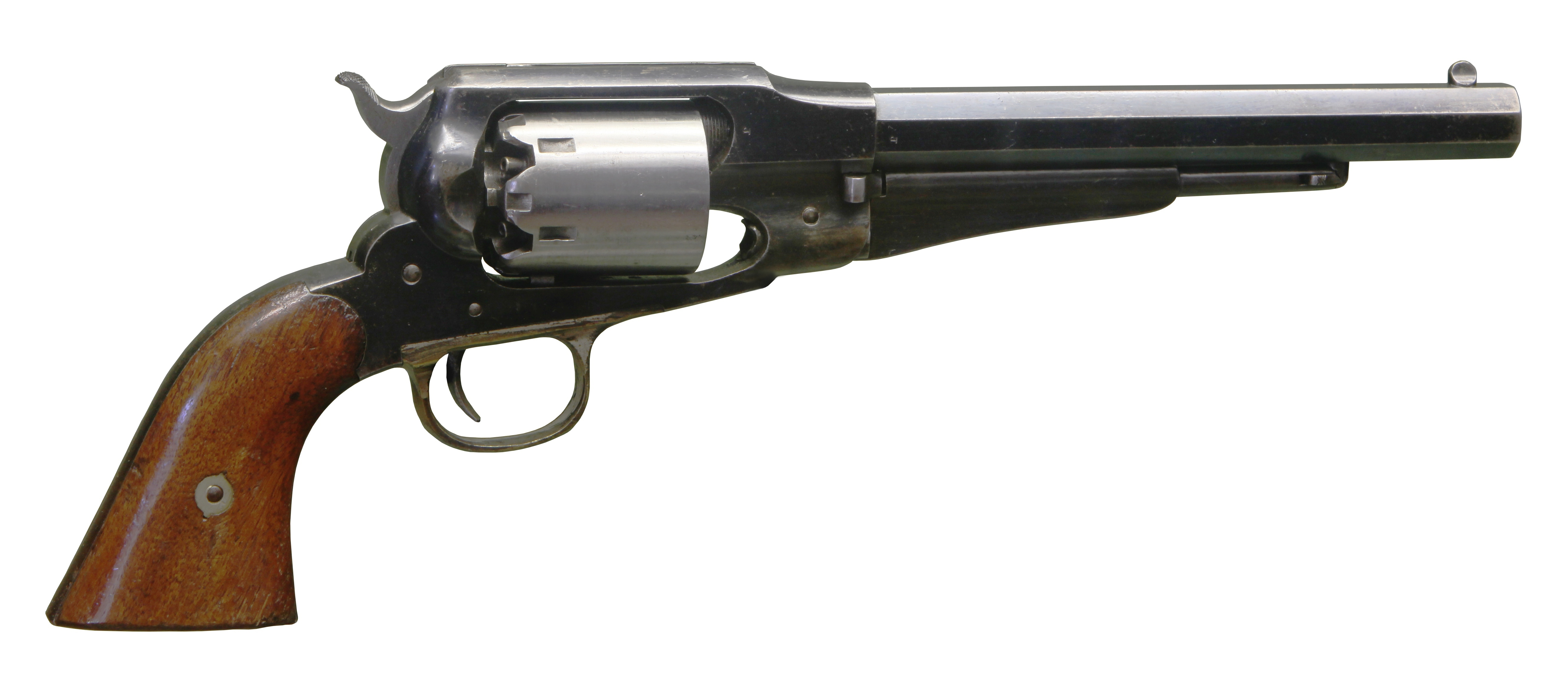
Remington New Model 1858 .44 "Army" pistol

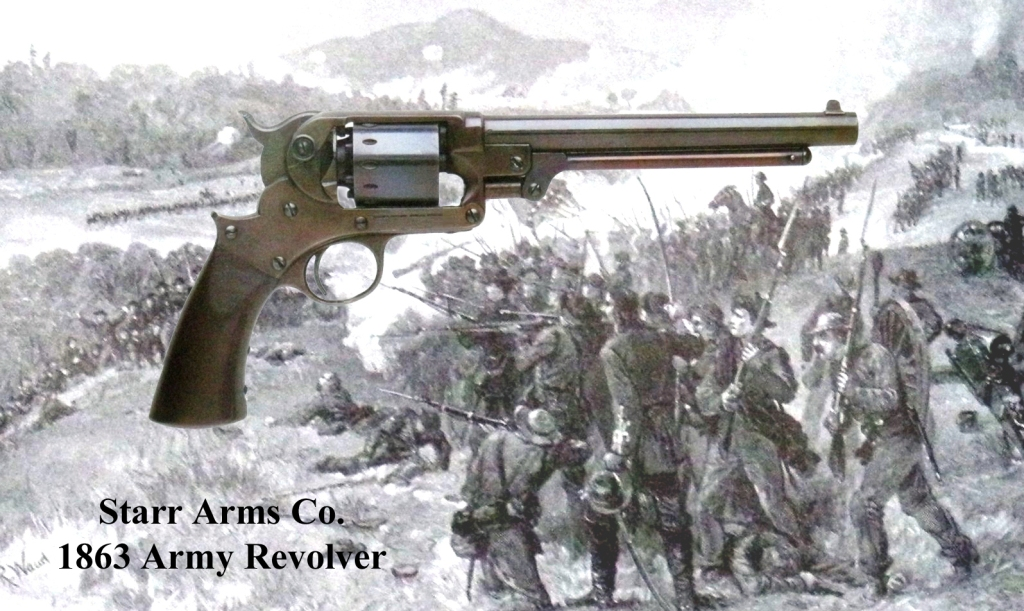
Starr M1863 .44 Single Action Revolver

==== Carbines ====
Issued weapons

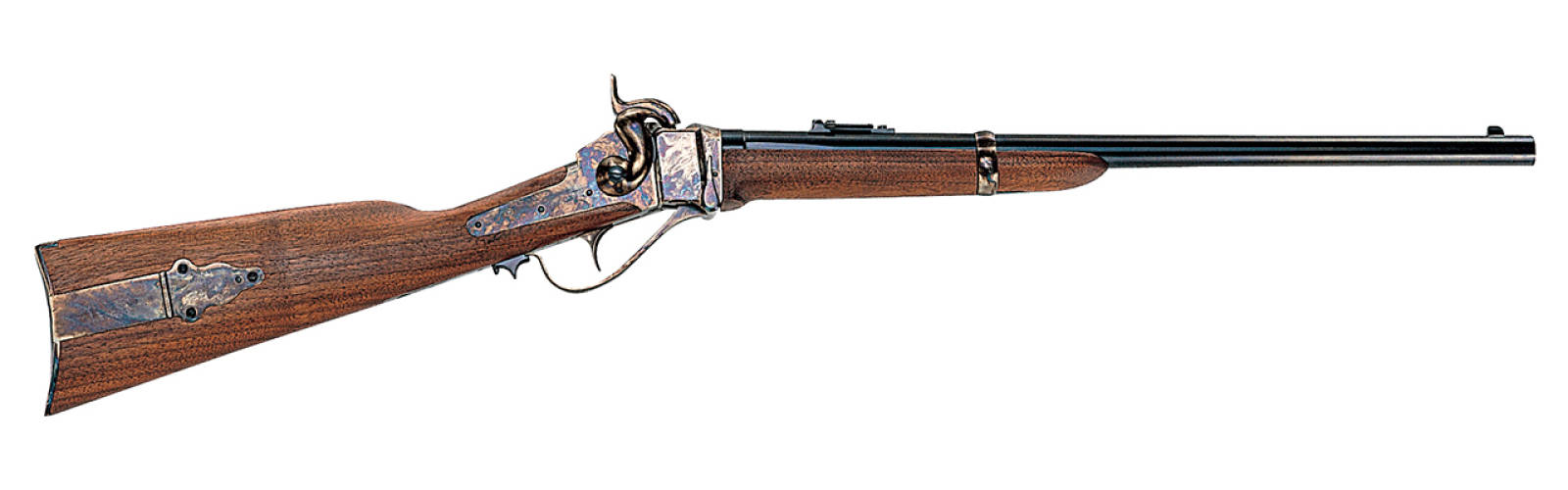
Sharps carbine

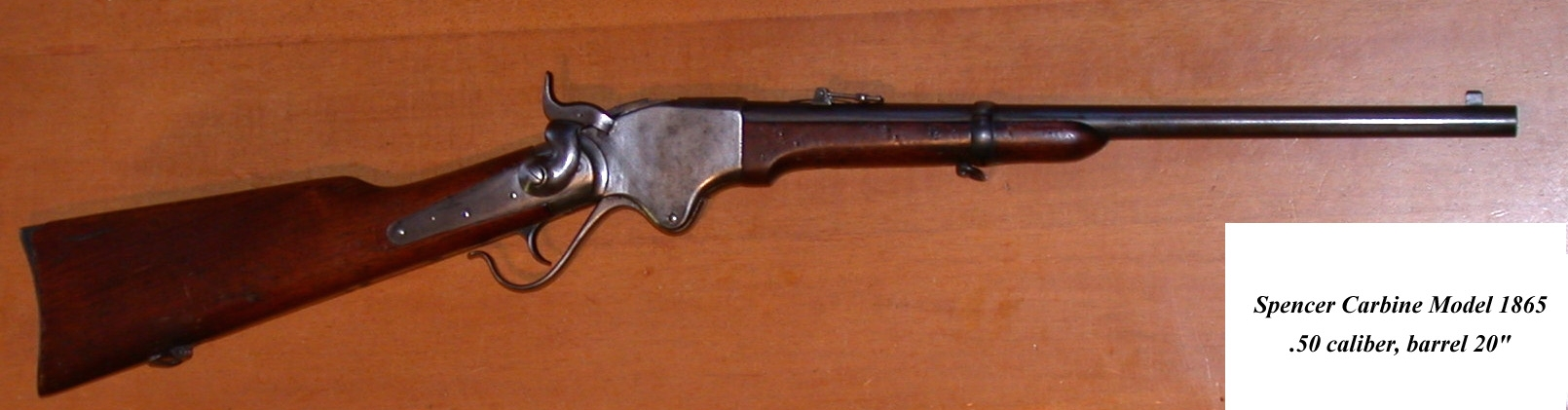
Spencer seven-shot carbine, issued weapon

=== Equipment and Tack ===
The 6th New York Cavalry used standard McClellan saddle and tack. Like many other volunteer cavalry regiments, the 6th New York obtained breast straps for all mounts while some troopers were issued crupper straps and martingales as well.

=== Uniform ===
The men of the regiment were issued their initial uniforms as they became available during training on Staten Island. They were issued dark blue Cavalry shell jackets, sky blue cavalry trousers (with reinforced seat), and the sky blue Cavalry winter overcoat (with a shorter cape than the infantry version). From photographs in the regimental history, the Hardee hat and slouch hat seemed to be more common than the kepi, or forage cap, among the regiment.

== Notable members ==
- Col. Thomas Devin - Initial commander, hero of Gettysburg
- Capt. William Laing Heermance, Company C - Awarded the Medal of Honor for most distinguished gallantry in action near Chancellorsville, Va., April 30, 1863.
- Pvt. Thomas Kelly, Company A - Awarded the Medal of Honor for capturing a Confederate battle flag at Front Royal, Va., August 16, 1864.
- Sgt. Patrick H. McEnroe, Company D - Awarded the Medal of Honor for capturing colors of 36th Virginia Infantry at Winchester, Va., September 19, 1864.
- Farrier George E. Meach, Company I - Awarded the Medal of Honor for the capture of a flag at Winchester, VA, September 19, 1864.
- Chief Bugler, later Second Lieutenant, Thomas McCoy Wells, Company F - Awarded the Medal of Honor for capturing colors of 44th Georgia Infantry at Cedar Creek, VA, October 19, 1864.

== See also ==
- List of New York Civil War units
- New York in the American Civil War
