= List of New York State Historic Markers in Westchester County, New York =

This is a complete list of New York State Historic Markers in Westchester, New York.

== Listings county-wide ==
	Marker name	Image	Date designated	Location	City or Town	Marker text
2	Camp Smith (New York)		1957	US 6-202, So. Bear Mt. Bridge	Cortlandt	Camp Smith. New York National Guard Training Camp Established 1882. Contains 1900 Acres. Named For Alfred E. Smith, Governor of New York
4	Crompound Road			US 202, E. of Peekskill, Clinton Ave. & Crompound Rd.	Cortlandt	Main Road from Yorktown to Peekskill In Colonial Days And During The Revolution
5	Jan Peeck Bridge			US 6, US 9 and US 202, So. of Peekskill Creek Bridge	Cortlandt	Named to Commemorate The Place Where Jan Peeck, Dutch Trader, 1640–1650, Met Indians to Trade For Furs HMDb 44864
6	Jan Peeck Bridge			US 6, US 9 and US 202, No. of Peekskill Creek Bridge	Cortlandt	Named to Commemorate The Place Where Jan Peeck, Dutch Trader, 1640–1650, Met Indians to Trade For Furs
7	Kings Ferry			Kings Ferry Rd., near Verplanck	Cortlandt	Important River Crossing In Colonial Days And The Revolution. Used By French And American Armies On March to Yorktown In 1782
8	Post Hannoch House			Kings Ferry Rd., 1 Mi. W. of US 9	Cortlandt	Owner Operated Kings Ferry 1664. Colonel Livingston's Headquarters, 1781. Washington Presented Medals to Captors of Andre Here In 1782
9	Sunset Hill			Pondfield Rd., W. of Valley Rd., Bronxville	Bronxville	Where In The Year 1666 Gramatan Chief of The Mohican Indians Signed The Deed Transferring Eastchester to The White Man
10	Andre Captured Here			US 9 at Park Entrance, Tarrytown	Tarrytown	Andre Captured Here In 1780 Three Honest Militiamen Arrested Major John Andre Adjt-Gen. British Army, Disguised, Preventing Disaster to American Cause.
11	Asbury M.E. Church			Washington and Elizabeth Sts., Tarrytown	Tarrytown	Founded 1796 By Rev. John Barnet Matthias, Itinerant Preacher. Church First Incorporated In 1807. This Building Erected 1837.
12	Battle of Edgar's Lane			US 9, No. of Farragut Pkwy. In Hastings-on-Hudson.	Hastings-on-Hudson	Sept. 30, 1778 Continental Dragoons Under Maj. Henry Lee Killed 23 Hessians On A Marauding Expedition. Battle Waged from Here to Ravine.
13	Christ Church			US 9 and Elizabeth St., Tarrytown	Tarrytown	Christ Church Erected In 1837. For Many Years Washington Irving Was Vestryman And Warden. Ivy Is from Cuttings from Vine On His Home Sunnyside.
14	Draper Park Memorial			In John W. Draper Memorial Pk. US 9 & Washington Ave., in Hastings-on-Hudson. 40.99195°N 73.87801°W	Hastings-on-Hudson	Draper Park Memorial to Dr. John William Draper 1811-1882 Astronomer And Historian Made 1st Photograph of Moon
16	Earth Redoubt Constructed			Foot of Church St., Tarrytown	Tarrytown	Earth Redoubt Constructed In Revolution, from Here The Local Water Guard Cannonaded British Sloop Vulture Returning from Andre-Arnold Meeting.
17	French Camp Hereabouts			Underhill Rd. & Clayton St., E. of Ardsley	Greenburgh	French Troops, Under Count De Rochambeau, Sent to Assist Washington Made Their Camp July 6, to August 19, 1781.
18	Isaac Van Wart			NYS 9A, Between Main & Van Wart Sts., Elmsford	Elmsford	One of Major Andre's Captors Sept. 23, 1780 Elmsford Citizen 1758-1820 Buried Here
19	John Dean Rock			Saw Mill R. Pkwy., So. of Hawthorne Circle	Hawthorne Circle	Refuge of Captain John Dean During The Revolutionary War
20	Second Reformed Church			US 9 and Central Ave., Tarrytown	Tarrytown 41°4′38.5″N 73°51′28″W	Second Reformed Church Erected In 1837 As South Church of Old Dutch Church of Sleepy Hollow Became A Separate Congregation 1851
21	Site of Couenhoven Inn Tavern			US 9 and Main St., Tarrytown	Tarrytown	Site of Couenhoven Inn Tavern Used During Revolutionary War, Where Washington Rested And Held Conference. Later Martin Smith's Inn.
22	Site of Graham Home			Access Dr., Thornwood	Thornwood	Dr. Isaac Gilbert Graham 1760-1849 Surgeon'S Mate, 1781-1783 In Revolutionary War.
23	Site of Home Sergeant Staats Hammond			S.E. Side Hawthorne Traffic Circle	Greenburgh	Site of Home Sergeant Staats Hammond 1744-1820 The Last Stopping Place of Major Andre Before His Capture At Tarrytown
24	Site of Mott Home School			US 9, No. of Hamilton Pl., Tarrytown	Tarrytown	Lawn Was Site of Old Home Built 1712. Scene of Activity In Revolution. Said to Be Home of Irving's Heroine Katrina Van Tassel.
25	The Headless Horseman Bridge			US 9, No. of Stone Bridge, North Tarrytown	North Tarrytown	Described By Irving In The Legend of Sleepy Hollow Formerly Spanned This Stream At This Spot
26	The Old Dutch Church			US 9 at Devens Ave., North Tarrytown	North Tarrytown	The Old Dutch Church of Sleepy Hollow, Built 1697 By Frederick Philipse, First Lord of The Manor. In Use Since Except In Revolution
27	Billy Crawford's Tavern			So. Columbus Ave., E. of So. Third Ave.	Mount Vernon	Billy Crawford's Tavern Built In 1732 Westchester Lodge Met Here In 1797
28	Brom Dyckman	100px		W. First St. & So. 11th Ave.	Mount Vernon	A "Westchester Scout" Was Mortally Wounded Here During A Skirmish On March 4, 1782
29	Saint Paul's Church			So. Columbus & So. Fulton Aves	Mount Vernon	Approaching Saint Paul's Church Eastchester Founded 1665
30	Colonial Road			So. Third Ave. at Washington Blvd.	Mount Vernon	From Philipse Manor to Old Boston Post Road At Eastchester
31	Colonial Road			Macquesten Pkwy. No., At Oak St.	Mount Vernon	Colonial Road from Philipse Manor to Eastchester Crossed Here
32	Eastchester Lane			So. 11th Ave. & Eastchester Lane	Mount Vernon	Part of Colonial Road from Philipse Manor to Eastchester
33	Hunt House			Rd. to Cross County Pkwy. from No. Columbus Ave.	Mount Vernon	Purchased By Israel Hunt from Thomas Lawrence, 1789.
34	Site of Fowler's Tavern			So. Columbus Ave. at So. Third Ave.	Mount Vernon	Built In 1733, Rebuilt 1799 Where Militia Gathered In 1776. Masons Met Here 1700-1814
35	Site of Morrell's Tavern			No. Columbus Ave., No. of Sherman Ave.	Mount Vernon	At A Skirmish Here On October 23, 1776, Ten Hessians And One American Fell.
36	College of New Rochelle			S.E. Corner Pelham Rd. & Leland Ave.	New Rochelle	First Catholic College For Women In New York State, Founded 1904.
37	College of New Rochelle			N.W. Corner Pelham Rd. & Leland Ave.	New Rochelle	First Catholic College For Women In New York State, Founded 1904.
38	Birthplace of John L. Worden			US 9, So. of Scarborough Rd.	Ossining, New York	Birthplace of John L. Worden 1818-1897 Rear Admiral U.S. Navy Commanded "Monitor" Against Merrimac Hampton Roads, Virginia, March 9, 1862
39	Sparta Cemetery		1932	US 9 at Cemetery, Ossining 41.1368°N 73.861°W	Ossining, New York	Set Apart By Col. Philipse Graves of Rev. Soldiers. Cannon Fire Hit Tombstone. First Site of Pres. Church Moved to Sing Sing In 1800. [Note: resting place of the Leatherman]
40	Union Hotel			US 9 at Church St., Ossining	Ossining, New York	Stood On This Corner About 1800 to 1890. Owned By Enoch Crosby, Jr., Later By Simeon M. Tompkins. Stage Stop N.Y. - Albany & Somers.
41	Site of James Fenimore Cooper Residence			Mamaroneck Rd. Between Murray Hill & Kelwynne Rd.	Scarsdale	Site of James Fenimore Cooper Residence. Erected 1817. Here Was Written The Spy 1821.
42	Camping Ground For American And British Forces			Seminary Ave. & Mile Square Rd.	Yonkers	Camping Ground For American And British Forces During The Revolution. Washington Used Nearby Valentine Homestead For Headquarters Frequently.
43	Colonial Road			Sprain R., No. of Tuckahoe Rd.	Yonkers	Sprain Road Over Which American Forces Passed In Advance And Retreat Before The Battle of White Plains, Oct. 26, 1776
44	Colonial Road			Sprain Rd., No. of Cemetery Entrance	Yonkers	Sprain Road Over Which American Forces Passed In Advance And Retreat Before The Battle of White Plains, Oct. 26, 1776
45	Colonial Road			Sprain Rd., So of Bridge	Yonkers	Sprain Road Over Which American Forces Passed In Advance And Retreat Before The Battle of White Plains, Oct. 26, 1776
46	Colonial Road			Sprain Rd., at Austin Ave.	Yonkers	Sprain Road Over Which American Forces Passed In Advance And Retreat Before The Battle of White Plains, Oct. 26, 1776
47	Manor Hall			Warburton Ave. & Dock St.	Yonkers	Begun 1682, Finished 1745 Seat of Philipse family Until 1779. Contains The Cochran Collection of Portraits of Presidents
48	Mile Square Road			Mile Square Rd., W. of Bronx River Rd. 40.9187°N 73.8480°W	Yonkers	Colonial Road, Eastchester to White Plains, Used By American Forces Before Battle of White Plains, Oct. 28, 1776
49	Mile Square Road			Mile Square Rd., E. of Central Park Ave.	Yonkers	Colonial Road, Eastchester to White Plains, Used By American Forces Before Battle of White Plains, Oct. 28, 1776
50	Site of Valentine Homestead			Seminary Ave., No. of Entrance to Seminary	Yonkers	Washington's Headquarters At Various Times During The Revolution. House Stood 150 Feet Back of Stone Markers.
51	Site of The Glebe			Saw Mill R. Rd., No. of Ashburton Ave.	Yonkers	125 Feet East of This Spot Stood St. John's Rectory, 1770 - 1845 On Land Given By Frederick Philipse 1751. Scene of Skirmishes 1778.
52	St. Johns First Public Burial Ground			Saw Mill R. Rd., No. of Ashburton Ave.	Yonkers	St. Johns First Public Burial Ground In Yonkers - About 1783. Graves of Soldiers of Revolution And Later Wars; Also Early Settlers of Yonkers
53	Yonkers			US 9, No. of Dudley St.	Yonkers	Named For The "Jonkheer" Adrien Van Der Doncked Patentee of Colen Donck 1641. Became Part of Manor of Philipsborough (Philipsburg) 1693
54	Parsonage Site of Presbyterian Church			US 9, No. of Dudley St.	Yonkers	Parsonage Site of Presbyterian Church Headquarters of Yorktown Committee Who Disarmed Loyalists In 1776. Burnt By British In 1779
55	Old Croton River Crossing			NYS 100, No. Side of Bridge Over Croton Reservoir	Yorktown	Old Croton River Crossing Important Bridge Head Guarded By American Troops During The Revolution
56	Yorktown Church			N.W. Corner US 202 & NYS 132, at Yorktown	Yorktown 41°17.649′N 73°48.531′W	Built By Presbyterians In 1738. Army Store House During Revolution. Burned By British 1779. Present Building Erected 1799

== See also ==
- List of New York State Historic Markers
- National Register of Historic Places listings in New York
- List of National Historic Landmarks in New York
- Neutral Ground of Westchester County in the Revolutionary War
