= Upperville =

Upperville may refer to:

- Upperville, Virginia, a city in Virginia
- The Battle of Upperville, an American Civil War battle
