= Cromwell's Run Rural Historic District =

Historic district in Virginia, United States

- U.S. National Register of Historic Places
- U.S. Historic district
- Virginia Landmarks Register
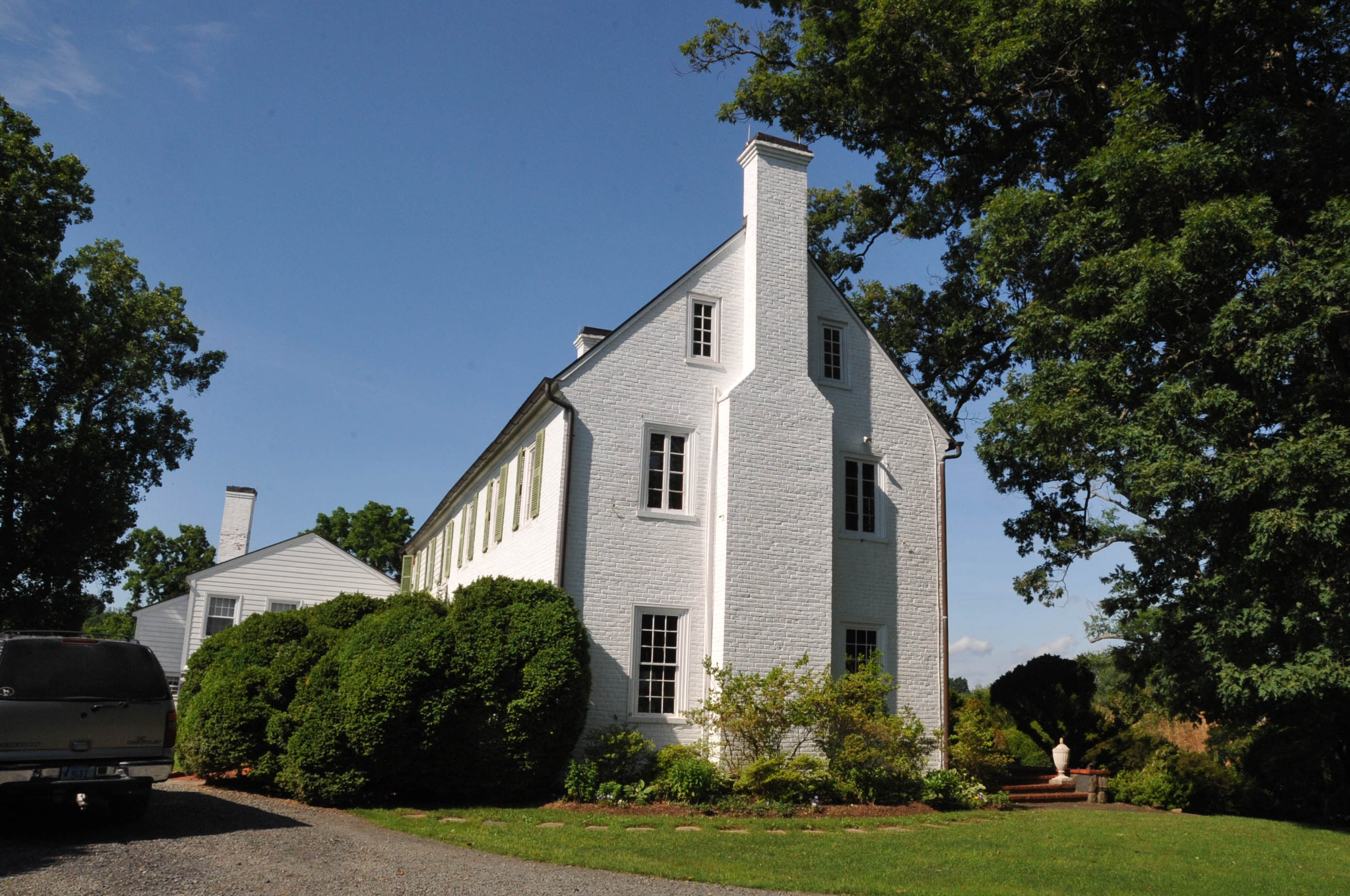

- Location within Northern Virginia Location within Virginia Location within the United States
- Location: Along Atoka Rd., roughly bounded on the west by Goose Creek, on the north by US 50, on the east by Cromwell's Run, near Rectortown, Virginia
- Coordinates: 38°57′44″N 77°56′20″W
- Area: 14,242.7 acres (5,763.8 ha)
- Built: 1772
- Architect: Dew, William Bland "Billy" Jr.; Potter, J. Sanford; et al.
- Architectural style: Colonial, Federal, Greek Revival, Split-level, ranch
- NRHP reference No.: 08000907, 08001051 (Boundary Increase)
- VLR No.: 030-5434

Significant dates
- Added to NRHP: September 19, 2008, November 12, 2008 (Boundary Increase)
- Designated VLR: June 19, 2008, September 18, 2008

Cromwell's Run Rural Historic District is a national historic district located near Rectortown, Fauquier County, Virginia. The district encompasses 384 contributing buildings, 20 contributing sites, and 36 contributing structures. It includes the separately listed Atoka Historic District and Rectortown Historic District.

It was listed on the National Register of Historic Places in 2008, with a boundary increase the same year.
