= Affair at Glenmore Farm =

1862 U.S. Civil War skirmish

- Part of the American Civil War
Date	October 16, 1862
Location	Loudoun County, Virginia 39.22°N 77.67°W
Result	Union victory

Belligerents
United States of America	Confederate States of America

Commanders and leaders
John W. Geary	

Units involved
6th New York Cavalry Regiment	35th Battalion of Virginia Cavalry

Strength
2 Brigades	1 company

Casualties and losses
unknown	24 (1 dead, 2 wounded, 21 captured)
- Location of the fight in Virginia

The Affair at Glenmore Farm was a small cavalry skirmish that took place October 16, 1862, in Loudoun County, Virginia, between Confederate forces under First Lieutenant Frank Myers and Union forces under General John Geary during the American Civil War. The skirmish resulted in a Union victory.

== Background ==
On September 9, part of the Army of Northern Virginia's artillery under Colonel R. L. Walker escorted by Col. Elijah V. White's Battalion entered Loudoun county at Point of Rocks after unsuccessfully trying to destroy the C&O Canal aqueduct over the Monocacy River. White led Walker to Loudoun Heights by way of Lovettsville and Hillsboro, as part of Robert E. Lee's plan to take Harpers Ferry to protect his flank during his Maryland Campaign.

White, who was not happy to be sent back in Virginia as he preferred to be with the rest of the army in Maryland, where he could recruit from his native state (Unfortunately, in Frederick he got in an altercation with Gen. Stuart who subsequently ordered back to Virginia. Gen. Lee, hoping to smooth things over, but who nevertheless had to support the senior Stuart, assigned White to this vital mission in the battalion's home county), resumed his partisan activities in the county after escorting Walker to Loudoun Heights.

=== The bombardment of Leesburg ===
At about the time the Battle of Antietam was occurring, Lt. Col. Hugh Judson Kilpatrick, commanding ten companies of cavalry, left Washington to reoccupy Leesburg and clear the area of any remaining Confederates. Upon arriving in Leesburg, Kilpatrick found the town held by Company A of the 6th Virginia Cavalry, forty or so infantrymen under the command Captain Gibson, and Colonel White and thirty of his troopers. As the infantrymen were largely convalescences and stragglers not fit to make the trek into Maryland and their force being greatly outnumbered, Gibson began to retreat from town. White, however, not wanting to give up his hometown without a fight, persuaded Gibson to resist the Federals as long as possible. A skirmish broke out between the Federal advance guard and the ragtag Confederate force near the courthouse square. In retribution for the Confederates' stubborn resistance, Kilpatrick ordered his artillery brought up and commenced firing on the town, forcing the Confederates to retreat west up the Winchester Pike. The degree of damage to the town is a matter of some dispute, with Confederates describing significant damage to buildings, while Kilpatrick reported only that he fired a few shots over the town. Once the artillery barrage ceased, Kilpatrick sent in the 10th New York Cavalry, which encountered the Confederates on the western edge of town. White attempted to lead his men in a charge, but he was severely wounded in the process, whereupon the force retreated to Harmony (present day Hamilton) and Kilpatrick took control of Leesburg.

== The Skirmish ==
On October 16, First Lieutenant Frank Myers, in nominal command of White's Battalion, while White recovered from his wounds inflicted at Leesburg, was ordered by Stonewall Jackson's quartermaster to secure cattle from the Lovettsville area. Myers made an attempt but was thwarted by the presence of General J.R. Kenly's Maryland infantry and cavalry. In retribution, a scouting party under John DeButts, later a member of Mosby's Rangers, was dispatched to harass Kenly, which they successfully did, driving his force back to Harpers Ferry. Thinking the area was clear of Federals and safe to raid, Captain Treyhorn, a new addition to the company, led a scouting party towards Berlin, Maryland (present day Brunswick), stopping in Lovettesville for the night on the 19th. The Federals, however, took notice of the Confederates, and General John Geary was dispatched from Harpers Ferry with two infantry brigades and 300 men from the Col Thomas Devin's 6th New York Cavalry Regiment to engage the scouting party.

On the morning of the 20th Treyhorn's pickets were captured by Geary's advance guard, prompting the Confederates to fall back towards Wheatland. As the Confederates began to fall back, Geary's main force reached Hillsborough, where he divided his force, sending Devin and the 6th New York east down the Charles Town Pike to Wheatland, where they then turned north up the Berlin Turnpike. Geary lead his force north up the Mountain Road, which ran parallel to the Berlin Pike, before turning east on the road to Morrisonville. At that village, on the Glenmore Farm, the two forks of the Union advance pinned the retreating Confederates. As Devin mounted a charge and Geary hit the flank of the 35th, Treyhorn deployed sharpshooters on top of nearby haystacks, who momentarily kept the infantry at bay, but before long the 35th was forced into a full retreat that quickly devolved into a rout that was only ended when the horsed of the 6th New York became too fatigued to continue the chase.

== Results ==
When the skirmish was over, the 35th had lost 1 dead, 2 wounded and 21 captured. Treyhorn was forced to resign and leave the company. The action represented the first major loss for the White's Battalion. Nevertheless, the company, which had become significantly large to become a battalion, was formally organized on the 28th by Col. Bradly T. Johnson of Gen. Stuart's command and given the official designation – the 35th Battalion of Virginia Cavalry.
