= D. C. Hatcher =

American politician (c.1837–1912)

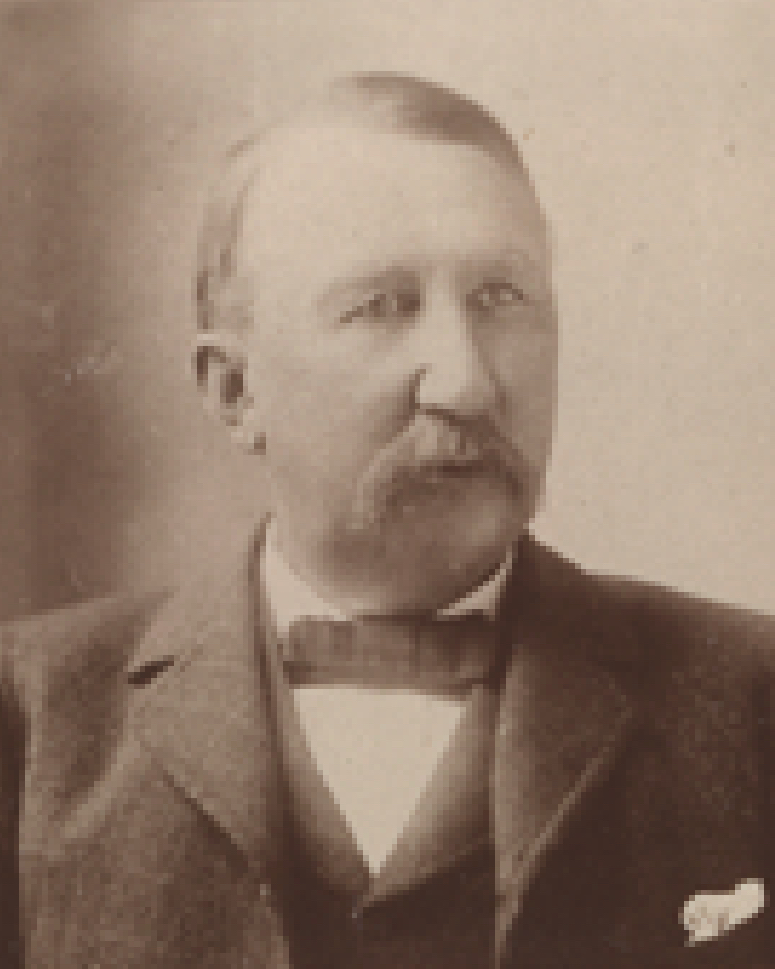

Member of the Virginia House of Delegates for Loudoun and Fauquier
- In office December 4, 1895 – December 6, 1899
- Preceded by: Eppa Hunton Jr.
- Succeeded by: William H. Lewis

Personal details
- Born: Daniel Cocke Hatcher c. 1837
- Died: January 5, 1912 (aged 74) Rectortown, Virginia, U.S.
- Party: Democratic
- Spouse: Mary Meta Chunn

Military service
- Allegiance: Confederate States
- Branch/service: Confederate States Army
- Years of service: 1861–1865
- Rank: Major
- Battles/wars: American Civil War

Daniel Cocke Hatcher (c. 1837 – January 5, 1912) was an American politician who represented Loudoun and Fauquier counties in the Virginia House of Delegates from 1895 to 1899.
