= Hugh Francis Redmond =

American paratropper and CIA officer

- Redmond in 1943
- Born: October 30, 1919; Yonkers, New York, USA
- Died: April 13, 1970 (aged 50)
- Military career
- Allegiance: United States
- Branch: United States Army; Office of Strategic Services; Strategic Services Unit; Central Intelligence Agency
- Service years: 1942–1970
- Rank: Lieutenant (United States)
- Unit: 101st Airborne Division
- Conflicts: World War II: Normandy Landings; Operation Market Garden; Battle of the Bulge
- Awards: Purple Heart; Bronze Star; Silver Star

Hugh Francis Redmond (October 30, 1919 – April 13, 1970) was an American World War II paratrooper (506th Infantry Regiment) and early CIA officer who conducted early operations in mainland China.

== Early life ==
Hugh Francis Redmond jr. was born October 30, 1919 in Yonkers, New York.

Redmond enlisted in the US Army on September 12, 1942. As a paratrooper, he made drops during the Normandy Landings, Operation Market Garden and Battle of the Bulge. He was injured twice, first during Operation Market garden, which was only minor. His second injury was during the Battle of the Bulge and it was severe. He had to recuperate for two years. After recuperation, he applied to the OSS.

== Life in China ==
Redmond was posted under official cover to China in 1946 as a member of US Navy External Survey Detachment 44 (ESD 44). He was briefly in Shanghai and Beijing (Peiping/Beiping) before moving to Shenyang (Mukden) in early 1947. On June 23, 1947, Redmond married a Harbin Russian named Lydia Eugenyevna Ananiewa in Beijing. They were apparently married in secret, since the Redmond family knew nothing of it until she arrived at their home in Yonkers, New York sometime between May 25, 1950 and August 19, 1950.

Redmond moved to Shanghai in the spring of 1949 and continued operating under non-official cover (NOC) as an ice cream machine salesman with Henningsen Produce Company.

There is ambiguity as to the circumstances of his arrest. Western sources say that he was arrested on April 26, 1951, while boarding a ship to San Francisco to return to the United States. Chinese sources however, say that he was not granted an exit visa and was arrested late at night at his apartment in Shanghai on April 27, 1951.

Redmond was held for three years and then tried on September 12, 1954 by a Shanghai military court. He was convicted along with six others for espionage.

He was imprisoned at Ward Road Prison, now called, Tilanqiao Prison in Shanghai for most of the nineteen years he was incarcerated. He was briefly moved to a prison in Beijing during the Cultural Revolution in 1967 and returned to Shanghai in 1970.

== Death ==
The Chinese claim he slit his wrists on April 13, 1970. The Chinese cremated his remains and they were returned to the United States. Neither his family nor the CIA was ever convinced that he had committed suicide, however. Redmond was buried in Yonker's Oakland Cemetery on August 3, 1970.

== Bibliography ==
- Allen, Maury (1998). China Spy: The Story of Hugh Francis Redmond. Yonkers, New York: Gazette Press. ISBN 0-9663322-0-2.
- Chambers, Ian David (2024). "Victors' History: Chinese Retrospectives on the Hugh Redmond Case". Journal of Intelligence History 23 (2): 155–177.
- Gup, Ted (2000). The Book of Honor: Covert Lives and Classified Deaths at the CIA. Doubleday. ISBN 0-385-49293-6.
- Singlaub, John (1991). Hazardous Duty: An American Soldier in the Twentieth Century. New York: Summit Books.
- Totrov, Yuri (2002). "American Intelligence in China (1945-1956)". Far Eastern Affairs 2: 100–116.
