= Rectortown Historic District =

Historic district in Virginia, United States

- U.S. National Register of Historic Places
- U.S. Historic district
- Virginia Landmarks Register
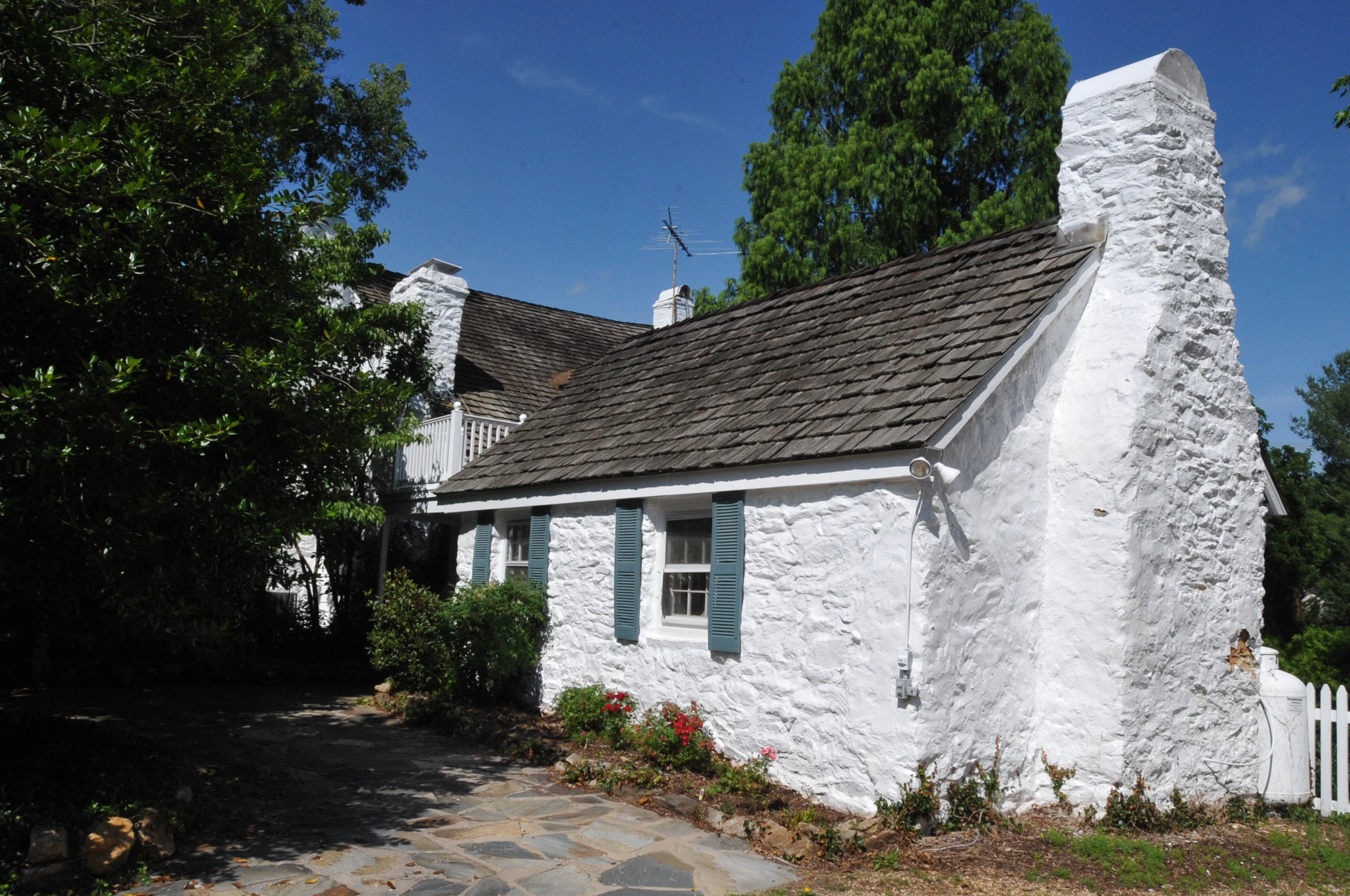

- Location within Northern Virginia Location within Virginia Location within the United States
- Location: Roughly bounded by Maidstone, Rectortown, Atoka, Lost Corner and Crenshae Rds., Rectortown, Virginia
- Coordinates: 38°55′12″N 77°51′38″W
- Area: 115 acres (47 ha)
- Built: 1772
- Architectural style: Greek Revival, Federal
- NRHP reference No.: 04001267
- VLR No.: 030-5155

Significant dates
- Added to NRHP: November 27, 2004
- Designated VLR: September 8, 2004

Rectortown Historic District is a national historic district located at Rectortown, Fauquier County, Virginia. It encompasses 76 contributing buildings, 3 contributing sites, and 2 contributing structures in the rural village of Rectortown. The district includes dwellings dating back to the 18th century, churches, a school, an Odd Fellows hall, a post office, multiple commercial buildings, and several cemeteries that illustrate the town's growth and development. Notable buildings include the Maidstone Ordinary (c. 1763), the Rector-Slack Log House, the Ashby House (c. 1800), the Georg Mann House, The Brick Store House (c. 1840), Rector's Warehouse and Station (c. 1835), Denham, Maidstone, Rectortown United Methodist Church (1894), the Jackson-Grant House (1924), Slack's Store (1890), and the Mt. Olive Odd Fellows Lodge (1935).

It was listed on the National Register of Historic Places in 2005. It is included in the Cromwell's Run Rural Historic District.
