= Atoka Historic District =

Historic district in Virginia, United States

- U.S. National Register of Historic Places
- U.S. Historic district
- Virginia Landmarks Register
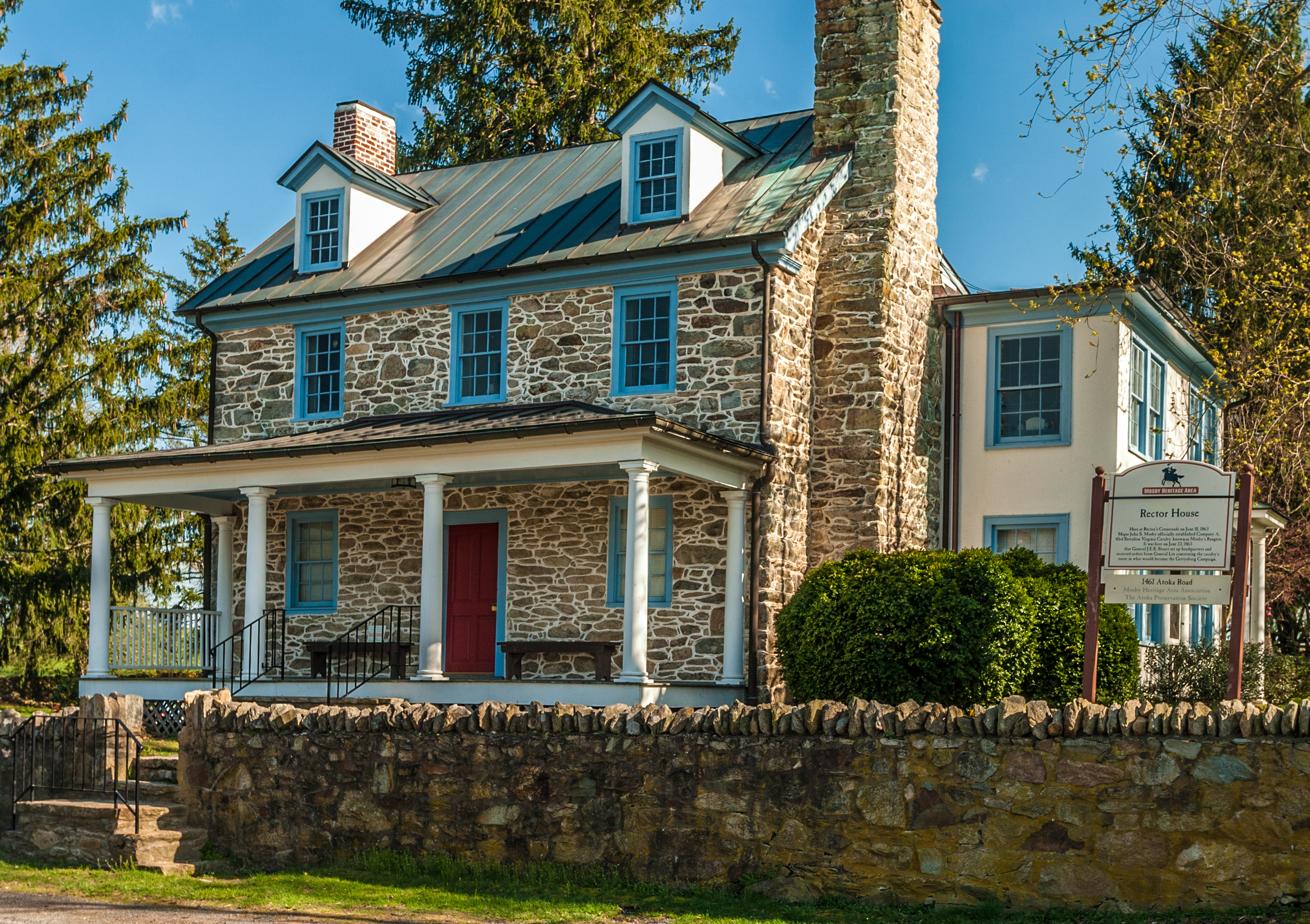
- Rector House, Atoka Historic District, April 2013

- Location within Northern Virginia Location within Virginia Location within the United States
- Location: 1461, 1466, 1468, 1481 Atoka Rd. & 7258, 7260 Rectors Ln., Atoka, Virginia
- Coordinates: 38°58′32.5″N 77°48′32.4″W
- Area: 6 acres (2.4 ha)
- Built: c. 1830
- NRHP reference No.: 04001266
- VLR No.: 030-5154

Significant dates
- Added to NRHP: November 27, 2004
- Designated VLR: September 8, 2004

Atoka Historic District is a national historic district located at Atoka, Fauquier County, Virginia. It encompasses 11 contributing buildings in the rural crossroads of Atoka. They include four dwellings and their various outbuildings, two commercial buildings, and a stone spring house. Notable buildings include the Caleb Rector House (c. 1830), the Atoka Store (c. 1893), and the Rector-Deane House (1893).

It was listed on the National Register of Historic Places in 2004. It is included in the Cromwell's Run Rural Historic District.
