= William L. Heermance =

American Civil War Medal of Honor recipient (1837–1903)

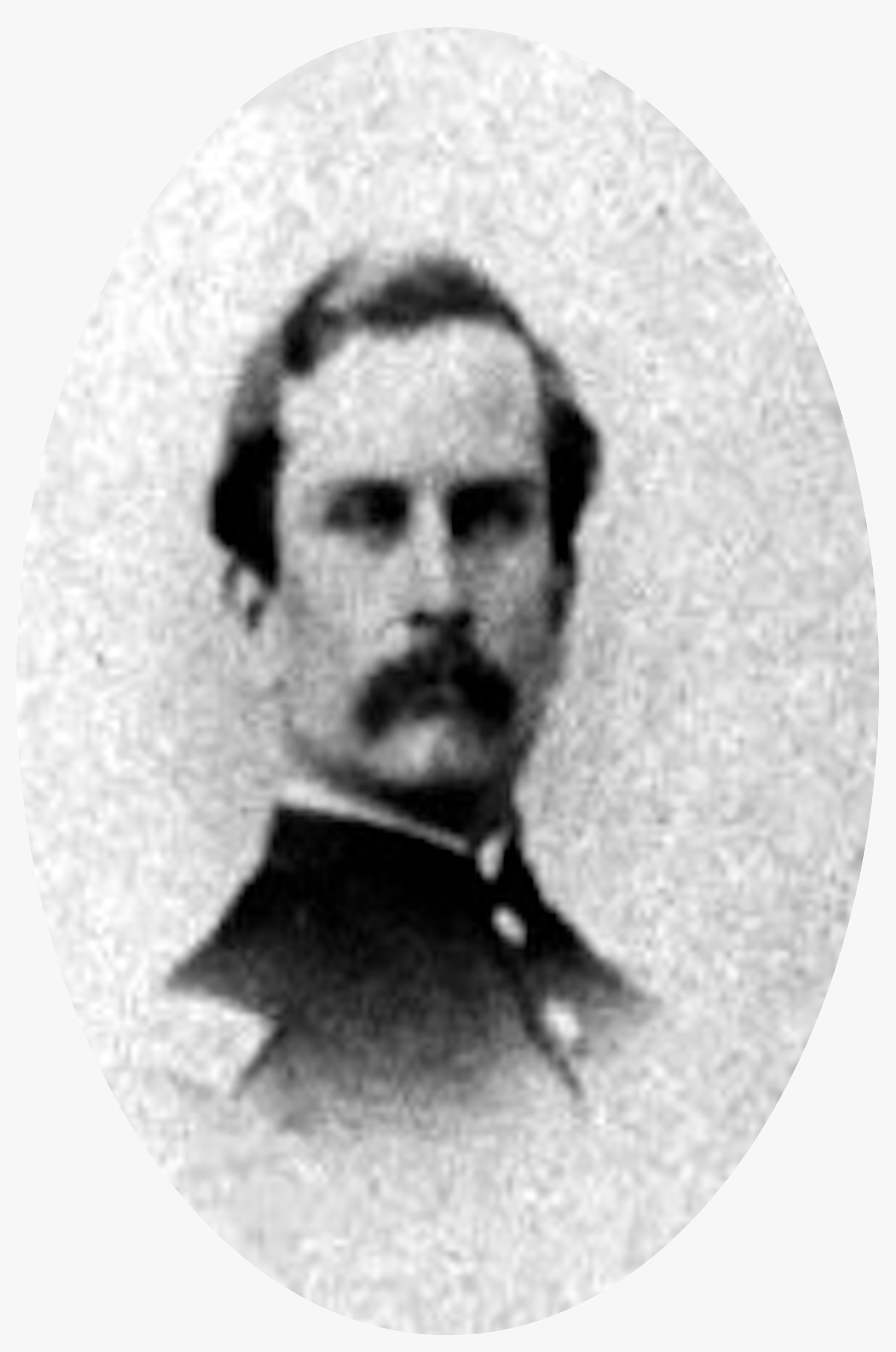
- Born: February 28, 1837; Kinderhook, New York
- Died: February 25, 1903 (aged 65)
- Burial place: Yonkers, New York
- Military career
- Allegiance: United States
- Branch: United States Army
- Rank: Captain
- Units: Company C, 6th New York Cavalry Regiment
- Conflicts: American Civil War; Battle of Chancellorsville
- Awards: Medal of Honor

William Laing Heermance (February 28, 1837 – February 25, 1903) was a Union Army soldier in the American Civil War who received the U.S. military's highest decoration, the Medal of Honor.

Heermance was born on February 28, 1837, and entered service at Kinderhook, New York. He was awarded the Medal of Honor for extraordinary heroism on April 30, 1863, while serving as a Captain with Company C, 6th New York Cavalry Regiment, at Chancellorsville, Virginia. His Medal of Honor was issued on March 30, 1898.

He died at the age of 65, on February 25, 1903, and was buried at the Oakland Cemetery in Yonkers, New York.

== Medal of Honor citation ==
The President of the United States of America, in the name of Congress, takes pleasure in presenting the Medal of Honor to Captain William Laing Heermance, United States Army, for extraordinary heroism on 30 April 1863, while serving with Company C, 6th New York Cavalry, in action at Chancellorsville, Virginia. Captain Heermance took command of the regiment as its senior officer when surrounded by Stuart's Cavalry. The regiment cut its way through the enemy's line and escaped but Captain Heermance was desperately wounded, left for dead on the field and was taken prisoner.
