= Thomas Kelly (Medal of Honor, 1864) =

Irish recipient of the Medal of Honor

Thomas Kelly (c. 1837 - ?) was an Irish born recipient of the Medal of Honor and soldier in the Union Army during the American Civil War.

== Biography ==
Kelly was born in Ireland in 1837. He served as private in Company A of the 6th New York Volunteer Cavalry. He earned his medal in action at Front Royal, Virginia on August 16, 1864. His medal was issued on August 26, 1864. His date of death and burial location is unknown.

== Medal of Honor Citation ==
For extraordinary heroism on 16 August 1864, in action at Front Royal, Virginia, for capture of flag.

== See also ==
- List of Medal of Honor recipients
- List of American Civil War Medal of Honor recipients: G-L
