= Goose Creek Stone Bridge =

- U.S. National Register of Historic Places
- Virginia Landmarks Register
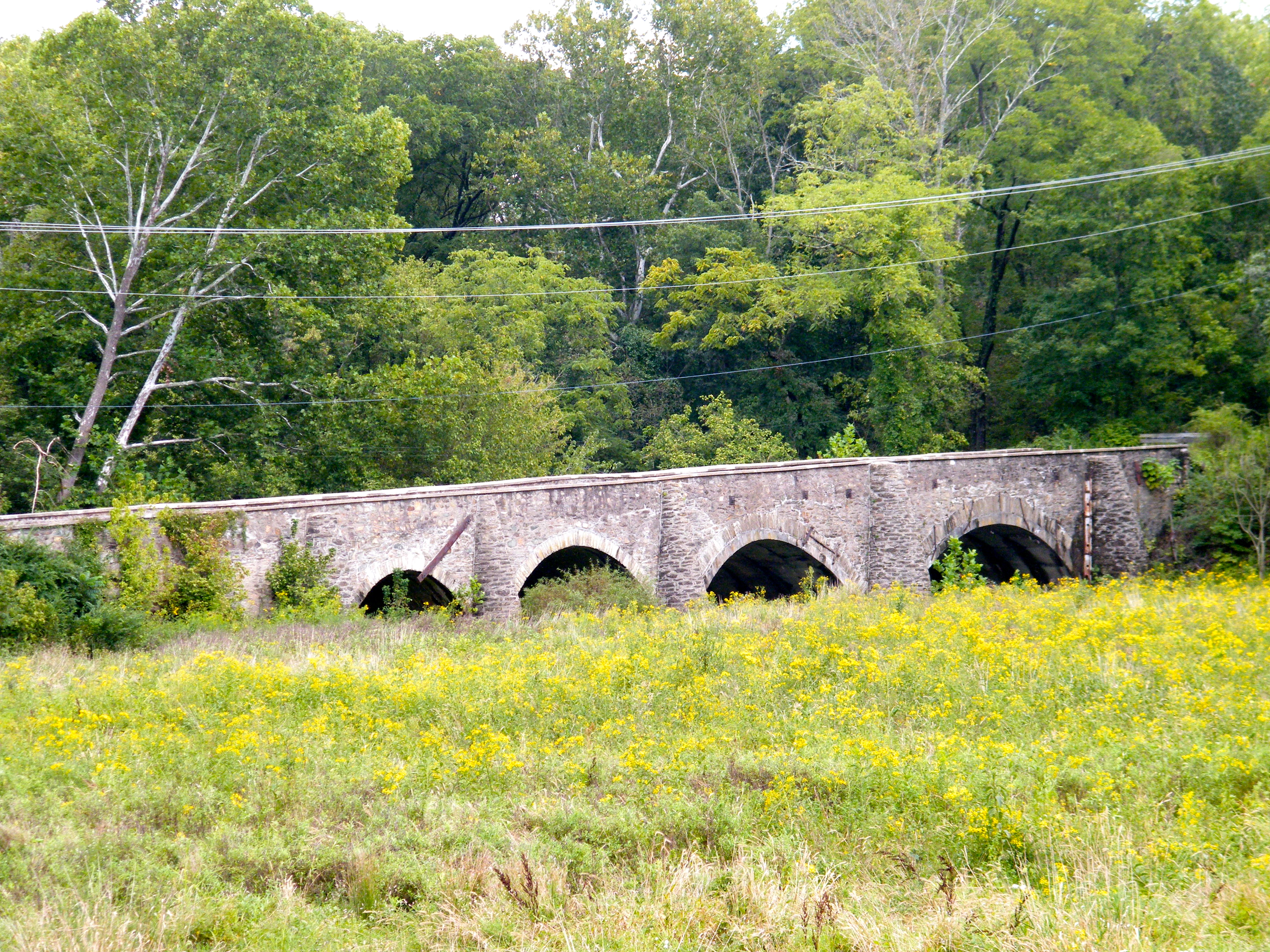
- Goose Creek Stone Bridge, September 2011

- Location within Northern Virginia Location within Virginia Location within the United States
- Nearest city: Atoka, Virginia
- Coordinates: 38°58′54.10″N 77°49′08.30″W
- Area: 26 acres (11 ha)
- Built: 1810
- NRHP reference No.: 74002134
- VLR No.: 053-0156

Significant dates
- Added to NRHP: October 9, 1974
- Designated VLR: May 21, 1974

The Goose Creek Stone Bridge crosses Goose Creek in Loudoun County, Virginia. The 200-foot (61 m) long stone arch bridge spans the creek in four arches. Built about 1810, it is the largest stone turnpike bridge in northern Virginia, designed to carry the Ashby's Gap Turnpike across the creek. The turnpike was replaced by U.S. Route 50, which crosses the creek a short distance to the south. The bridge is no longer used for vehicular traffic. The bridge was a center of fighting in the American Civil War on June 21, 1863, during the Battle of Upperville.

The Goose Creek Bridge was placed on the National Register of Historic Places on October 9, 1974.

== See also ==
- List of bridges on the National Register of Historic Places in Virginia
