= Thomas M. Wells =

Irish-born Union Army soldier and officer

- Born: c. 1841; Ather, Ireland
- Died: 1901; New York City
- Burial place: East DeKalb Cemetery, De Kalb Junction, New York
- Military career
- Allegiance: United States
- Branch: United States Army; Union Army
- Service years: 1861 - 1865
- Rank: First Lieutenant
- Unit: (New York (state)) 6th New York Cavalry Regiment
- Conflicts: American Civil War • Battle of Cedar Creek
- Awards: Medal of Honor

Thomas McCoy Wells (c. 1841 – February 5, 1901) was an Irish born Union Army soldier and officer during the American Civil War. He received the Medal of Honor for gallantry during the Battle of Cedar Creek fought near Middletown, Virginia on October 19, 1864. The battle was the decisive engagement of Major General Philip Sheridan's Valley Campaigns of 1864 and was the largest battle fought in the Shenandoah Valley.

Wells enlisted in the Army from De Kalb, New York in November 1861, and was assigned to the 6th New York Cavalry Regiment. He was commissioned as a second lieutenant in January 1865, and promoted to first lieutenant the following May. Wells was transferred to the 2nd Provisional NY Cavalry in June 1865, and mustered out with this regiment the following August.

== Medal of Honor citation ==
"The President of the United States of America, in the name of Congress, takes pleasure in presenting the Medal of Honor to Chief Bugler Thomas McCoy Wells, United States Army, for extraordinary heroism on 19 October 1864, while serving with 6th New York Cavalry, in action at Cedar Creek, Virginia, for capture of colors of 44th Georgia Infantry (Confederate States of America)."

== See also ==
- List of Medal of Honor recipients
- List of American Civil War Medal of Honor recipients: T-Z
