= Atoka, Virginia =

Unincorporated community in Virginia, United States

- Unincorporated community
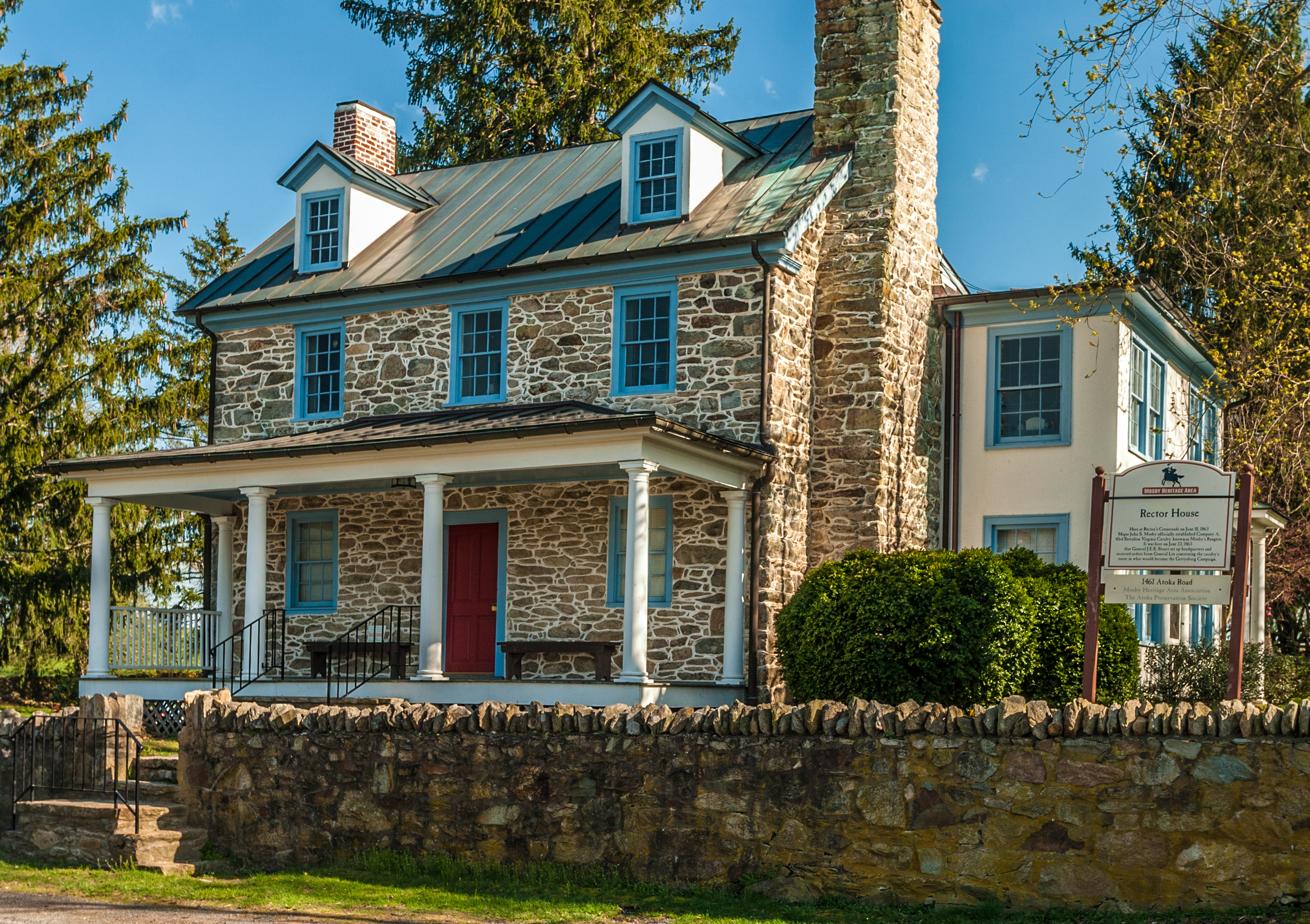
- The Rector House in Atoka

- Location within Virginia Location within the United States
- Coordinates: 38°58′32″N 77°48′34″W
- Country: United States
- State: Virginia
- County: Fauquier
- Elevation: 469 ft (143 m)
- Time zone: UTC-5 (Eastern (EST))
  - Summer (DST): UTC-4 (EDT)
- Area code: 540
- GNIS feature ID: 1499070

Atoka is an unincorporated hamlet in Fauquier County, Virginia, United States. Atoka is located along U.S. Route 50, 4 miles (6.4 km) west of Middleburg.

The Atoka Historic District, which is listed on the National Register of Historic Places, is located in Atoka. The Goose Creek Stone Bridge is located near Atoka in Loudoun County.
