= Camp Devin =

- Carter County, Montana, near Alzada, Montana

Site information
- Type: Military Camp
- Owner: Private property

Site history
- Built: 1878
- Built by: United States Army
- Demolished: 1878 (abandoned)

Garrison information
- Past commanders: Lieutenant Colonel Luther P. Bradley
- Garrison: 9th U. S. Infantry

Camp Devin was a temporary United States Army camp established on June 30, 1878, during the building of the Fort Keogh-Deadwood Telegraph Line. It was named for Brevet Major General Thomas C. Devin, and abandoned in late 1878.

== History ==
On June 1, 1878, Lieutenant Colonel Luther P. Bradley and 520 men of the 9th United States Infantry left Fort Laramie following the Cheyenne-Deadwood Stage route to the Black Hills. Their mission was to construct a telegraph line between Deadwood and Fort Keogh, thus tying together Montana, Wyoming, and Dakota Territories. At the conclusion of a 30-day march they established a summer bivouac on June 30, 1878, and named it Camp Devin for Colonel and Brevet Major General Thomas C. Devin, the late commander of the 3rd U.S. Cavalry, who had died on April 4, 1878. The camp had a life of only two months. Although the existence of the camp was short, its occupants fulfilled their mission. The completed telegraph line resulted in improved communications between forts and white settlements, opening the way for domestication of southeast Montana.

== Location ==
Camp Devin is located at an unknown location in present-day southeastern Carter County, Montana near the Census-designated place of Alzada, Montana, near the Little Missouri River. Just outside Alzada near the Montana-Wyoming Border on Montana Highway 326 there is a historical marker giving information about Camp Devin.

== See also ==
- List of military installations in Montana
