= Oakland Cemetery (Yonkers, New York) =

Cemetery in Westchester County, New York

Coordinates: 40°56′22″N 73°52′49″W

Oakland Cemetery is located at 2 Saw Mill River Road in Yonkers, New York, next to St. John's Cemetery. It was incorporated in 1875 and named Oakland Cemetery in 1882. In time, graves from the Civil War filled the cemetery, as did those of other settlers of Yonkers who died.

The cemetery is divided into two halves with a hill separating the western lower half from the eastern upper half. The eastern half borders on the Saw Mill River Parkway, while the western half borders on Saw Mill River Road, where all of the entrances are located. There are two entrance gates that are large enough for a vehicle to enter through and one other smaller entrance gate for pedestrian visitors.

The original cemetery was established around 1783 as St. John's Cemetery. That site holds the graves of notable 19th-century Yonkers residents and over 200 American military veterans, spanning from the Revolutionary War to World War I. Unidentified victims of the 1851 Henry Clay steamboat disaster are also buried in St. John's Cemetery, in a mass grave (the disaster occurred on the Hudson River near Yonkers).

The first burial in a larger, non-sectarian public cemetery, south and east of the original St. John’s property, was recorded on September 2, 1867. This new cemetery was initially managed by the Yonkers Cemetery Association, founded in 1866. When the association faced financial difficulties and was reorganized in June 1882, it was renamed the Oakland Cemetery Association, and the burial place was officially renamed Oakland Cemetery.

== The Glebe ==
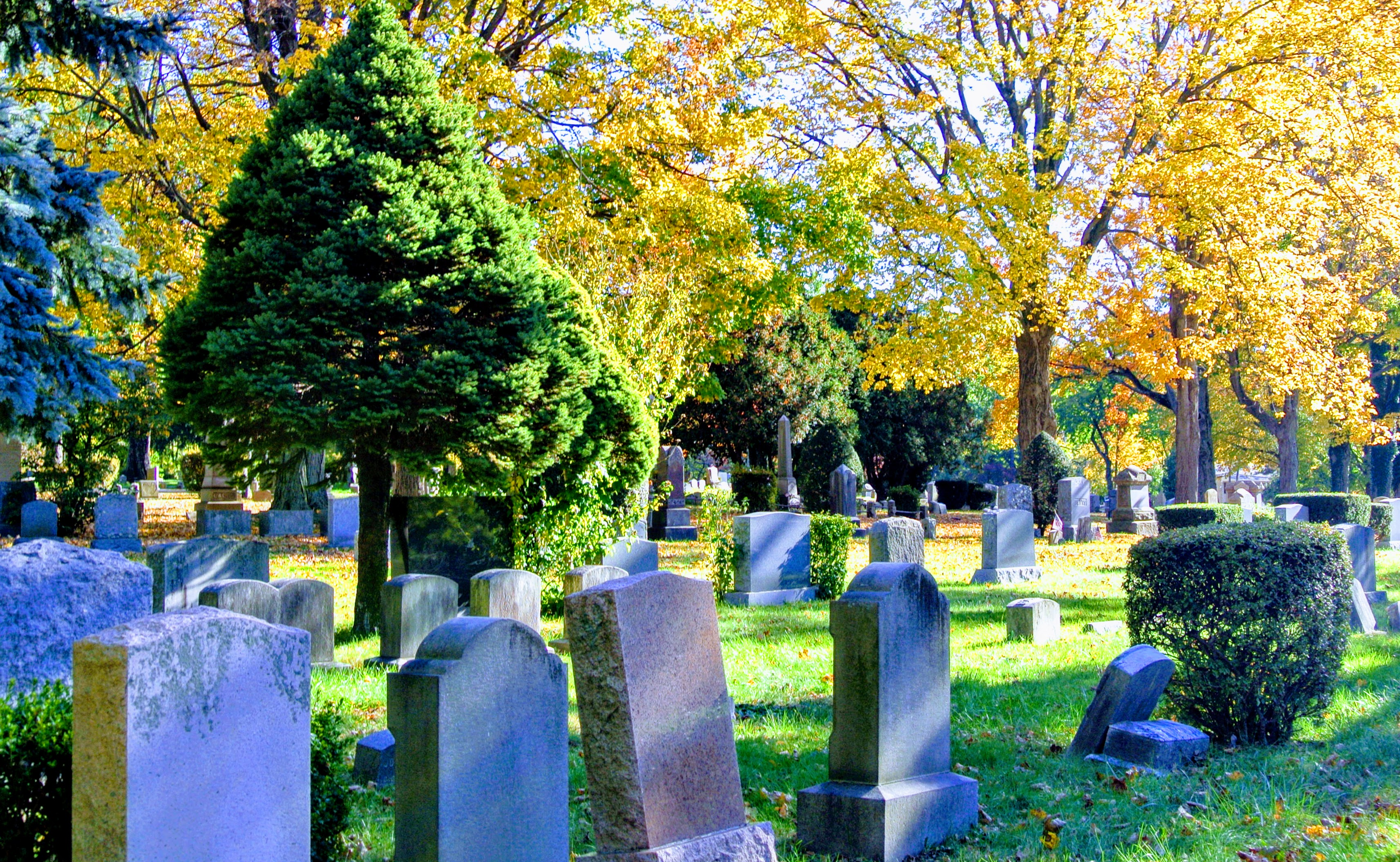
The former site of St. John's Rectory (1770–1845) in Yonkers, NY

Dutch-born merchant and trader Frederick Philipse, the first Lord of Philipsburg Manor, bequeathed to his children “The Glebe” – a portion of land, for the use by ministers of the Church of England that were inducted into St. John's Protestant Episcopal Church. The Philipse family, who were Tory sympathizers, fled to England during the Revolutionary War, and their property was taken by attainder. Subsequently, in 1866, the Glebe land (in what by then was the city of Yonkers) was placed under debt by lawyer Leonard W. Jerome, who, over the years, parceled several farms in the area. He later redeemed the land not used by the cemetery and rectory, and the Yonkers Cemetery Association took title. St. John's Cemetery is accessible by entering through Oakland Cemetery.

== Notable interments ==
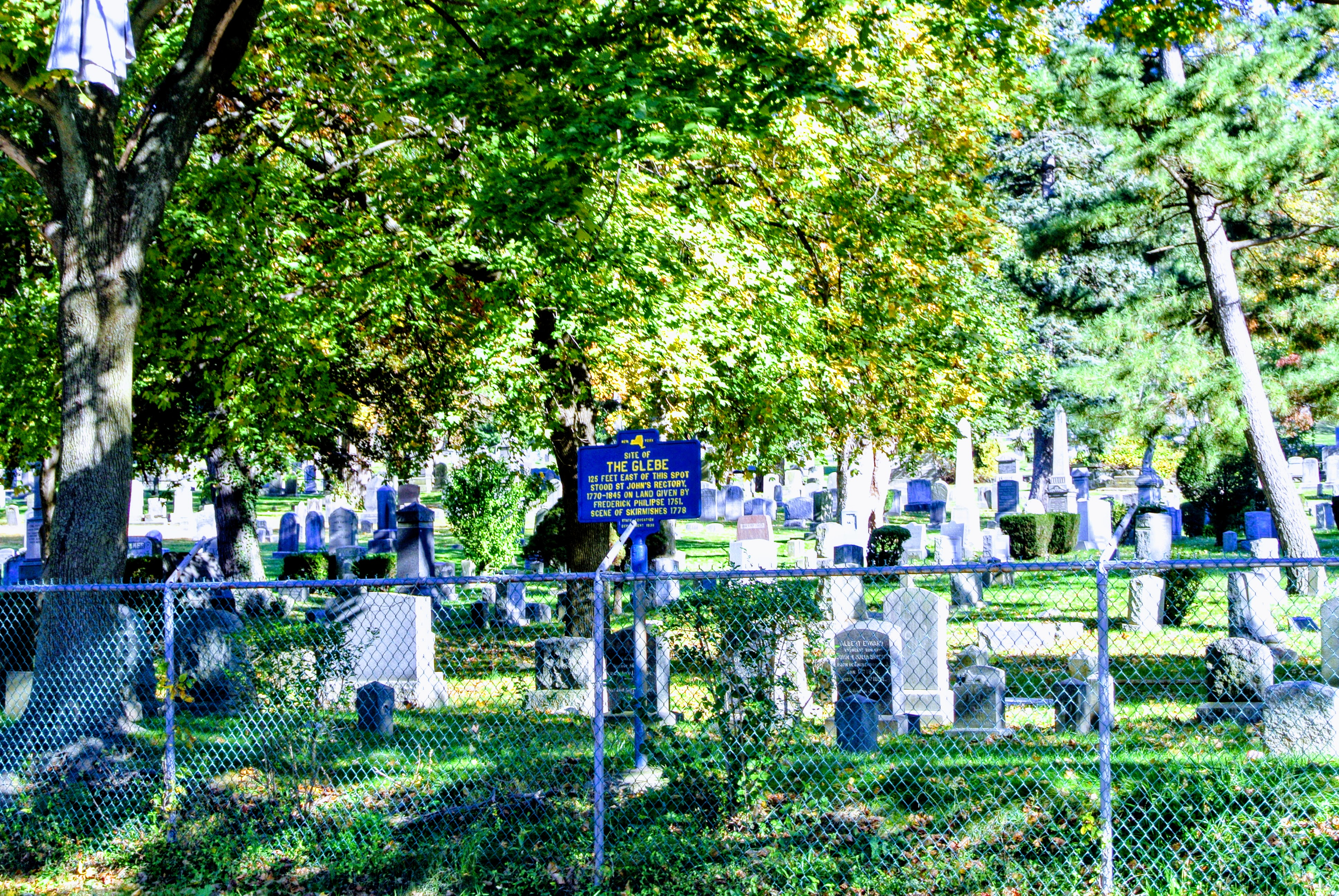
The Glebe Historic marker in Yonkers, NY, looking north

- DMX (1970–2021) rapper and actor
- Thomas Ewing Jr. (1829–1896), Union Army General
- William L. Heermance (1837–1903) a Union Army soldier in the American Civil War who received the Medal of Honor.
- Benjamin Franklin Isherwood (1822–1915), Union Civil War admiral
- Joe Lapchick (1900–1970), Saint John's University and New York Knicks basketball coach
- Dr. Charles Leale (1842–1932), a 23-year-old army surgeon who attended to Lincoln when he was shot at Ford's Theatre
- Elisha Otis (1811–1861), industrialist, inventor, and founder of Otis Elevator Company
- Hugh Francis Redmond – American CIA agent and veteran
- Nicholas Timasheff (1886–1970), sociologist, professor of jurisprudence and writer
- William W. Woodworth (1807–1873), US Congressman
