= Hawthorne Circle =

Demolished traffic circle in New York

Hawthorne Interchange
- Hawthorne Circle
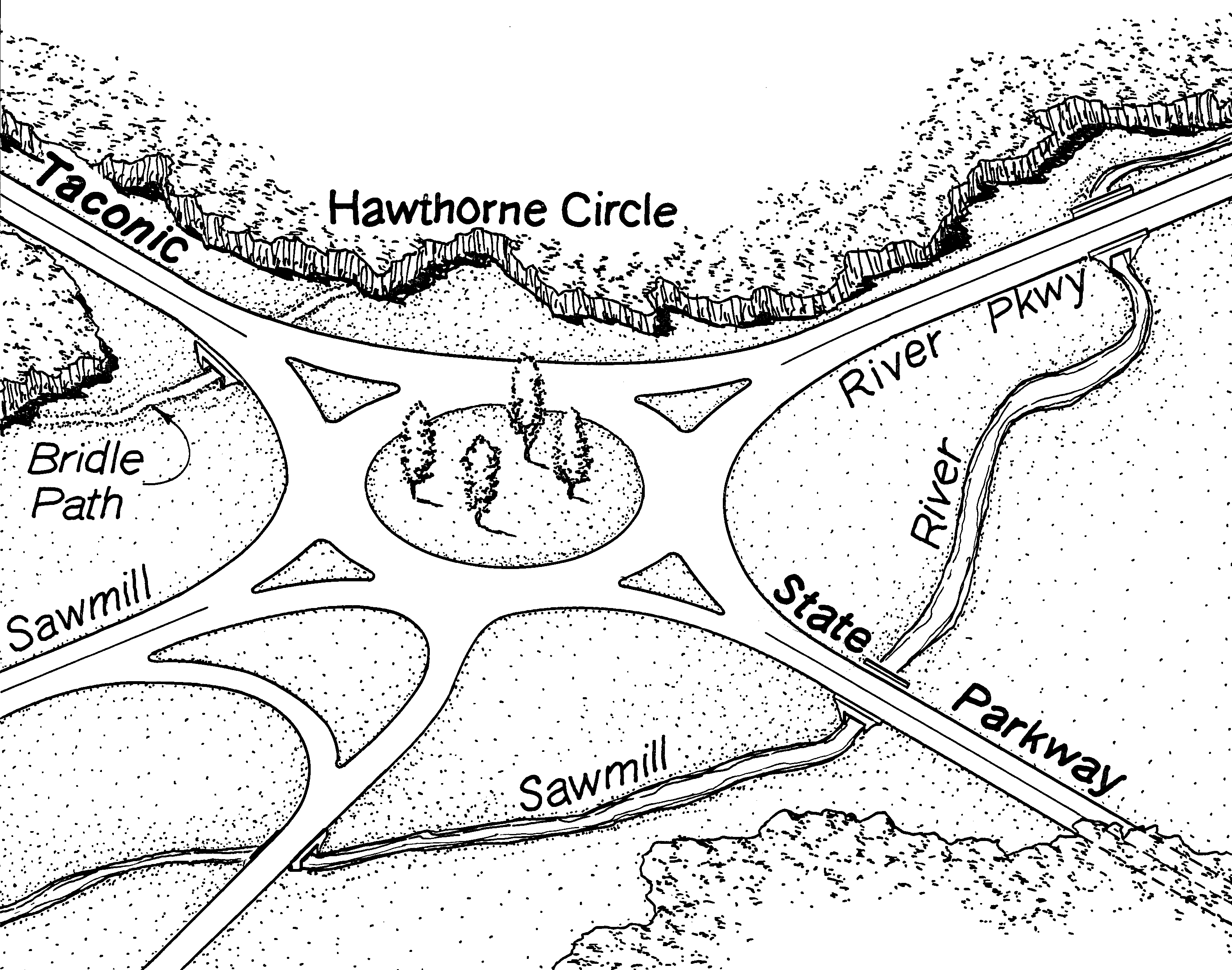
- A map of the interchange's former iteration as a traffic circle

Location
- Hawthorne, New York, United States
- Coordinates: 41°6′34.3″N 73°48′6.4″W
- Roads at junction: Taconic State Parkway; Saw Mill River Parkway

Construction
- Type: Three-level partial stack interchange (former traffic circle)
- Spans: 4
- Lanes: 10
- Constructed: 1929-1931, 1971 by WCPC and NYSDOT
- Opened: 1931 (as a circle); 1971 (as an interchange)
- Maintained by: NYSDOT

Hawthorne Circle was a large traffic circle connecting two major state highways located in Hawthorne, New York, United States, which carried over 67,000 cars daily at its peak. Opened in 1931 to join the Taconic and Saw Mill River Parkways, it was replaced in 1971 with a three-level interchange. A 2.6-mile (4.18 km) segment of the Taconic continued on to connect to the Bronx River Parkway, adding to the area's congestion.

The Sprain Brook Parkway, the northern terminus of which lies just south of the circle, was not completed until 1980.
