= Battle of Guard Hill =

Battle of the American Civil War

Coordinates: 38°57′11″N 78°12′0.5″W

- Part of the American Civil War
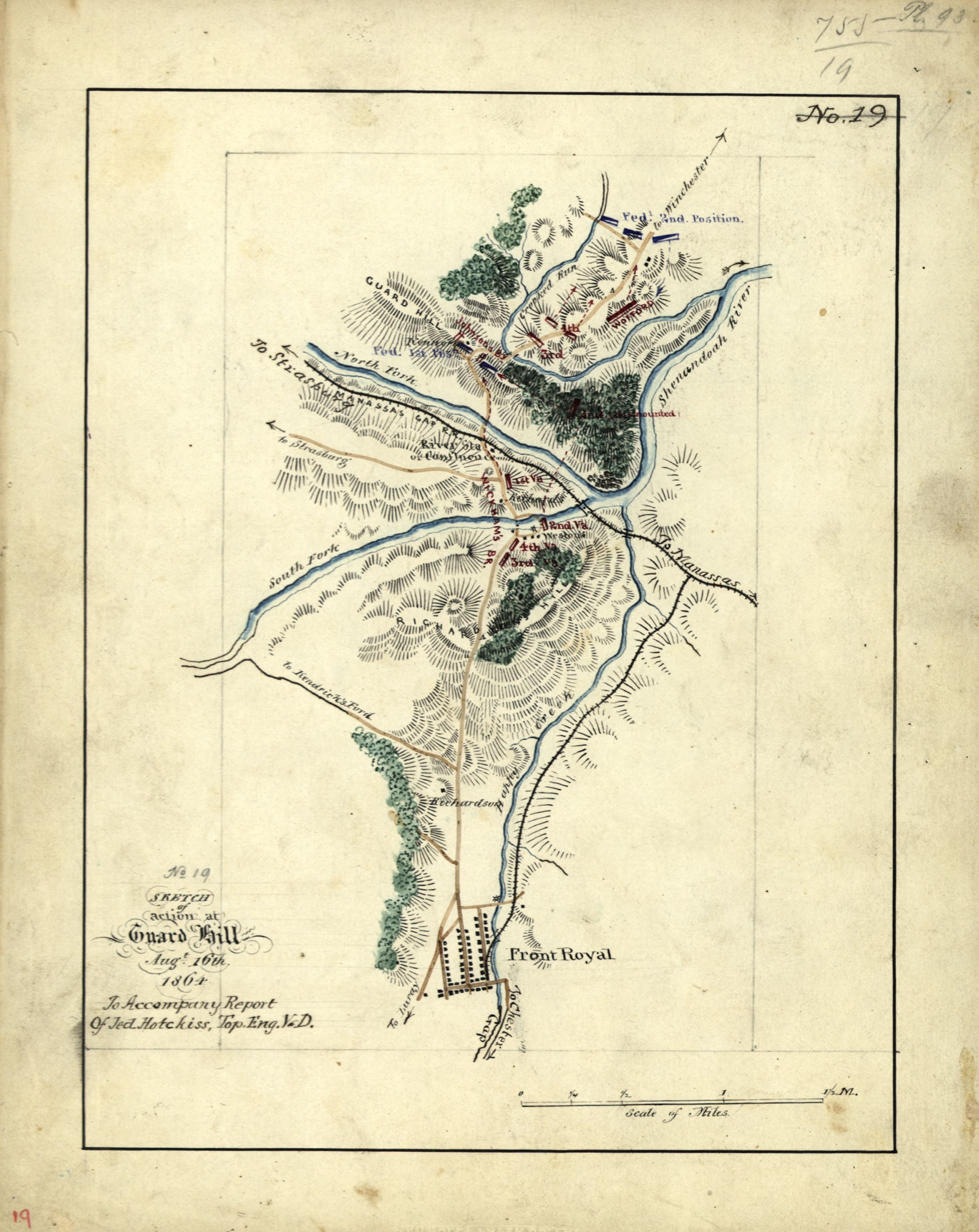
- Sketch of Action by Jedediah Hotchkiss.
Date	August 16, 1864
Location	Warren County, Virginia
Result	Union victory

Belligerents
United States (Union)	(Confederate States of America) CSA (Confederacy)

Commanders and leaders
Thomas C. Devin	William Wofford

Strength
Brigades	Brigades

Casualties and losses
71	480

The Battle of Guard Hill, Battle of Crooked Run, Battle of Cedarville, or the Battle of Front Royal took place on August 16, 1864, in Warren County, Virginia as part of Philip H. Sheridan's Shenandoah Valley Campaign of the American Civil War. Confederate forces under Richard H. Anderson were sent from Petersburg to reinforce Early. Brig. Gen. Wesley Merritt's Union cavalry division surprised the Confederate columns while they were crossing the Shenandoah River, capturing about 300. The Confederates rallied and advanced, gradually pushing back Merritt's men to Cedarville. The battle was inconclusive.

== Battle ==
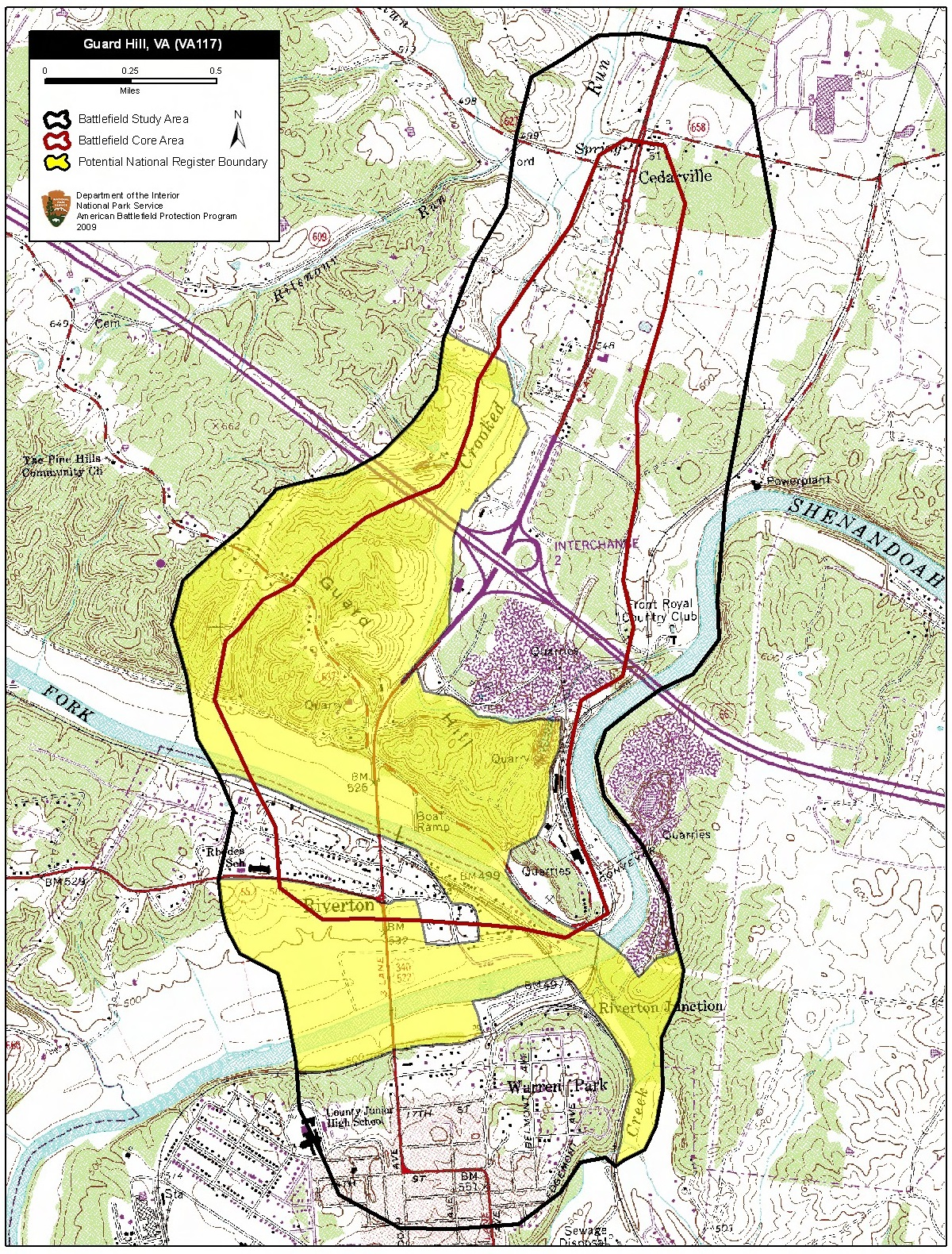
Map of Guard Hill Battlefield core and study areas by the American Battlefield Protection Program.

On the morning of August 16, Confederate troopers scattered the Federal pickets at the Shenandoah River crossing at Front Royal. The troopers pursued them down the Front Royal Pike, eventually coming to Guard Hill, a prominent landmark. There, they were hit by Union Brig. Gen. Thomas C. Devin's dismounted cavalry brigade and sustained heavy losses. Confederate Brig. Gen. William T. Wofford's brigade attempted a flanking movement by wading across Crooked Run. There, they were attacked by two New York brigades, who took 300 of them captive. Union Brig. Gen. George A. Custer's Michigan Brigade rode toward the battle and sustained Devin's line along Crooked Run until they were forced to withdraw to Cedarville by Confederate artillery now on Guard Hill.

During the afternoon of August 16, Williams C. Wickham led a charge of Brig. Gen. Thomas C. Devin's brigade army towards Cedarville. Devin brought two of his regiments forward in order counterattack, but a Confederate and a Union regiment strikes each other in a sword fight. The Confederate broke apart and retreated back to their positions and Wickham led another charge resulting in the Union's force to weakened to the point where his own men have to cross the river again. While Devin's unit captured two flags and 139 soldiers. The Union's victory had been planned out very well. Brig. Gen. Wesley Merritt, commander of the 1st Division, Cavalry Corps of the Army of the Shenandoah, confirmed the presence of the Confederate which forced Sheridan to order a retreat down the valley from the town, Front Royal. On the night of the battle, Sheridan's unit went back to their lines at Harper's Ferry, West Virginia and once the night had passed by, Merritt and his unit went to Nineveh, Virginia.

== Outcome ==
According to Patchan, the Union's superior numbers and quality leadership routed the Confederate infantry, and the battle proved a watershed event in the Shenandoah Valley campaign.
