= Rectortown, Virginia =

Unincorporated community in Virginia, United States

- Unincorporated community Census designated place
- Location within Virginia Location within the United States
- Coordinates: 38°55′16″N 77°51′41″W
- Country: United States
- State: Virginia
- County: Fauquier

Area
  - Total: 0.64 sq mi (1.67 km^{2})
  - Land: 0.64 sq mi (1.65 km^{2})
  - Water: 0.0077 sq mi (0.02 km^{2})
- Elevation: 518 ft (158 m)
- Time zone: UTC−5 (Eastern (EST))
  - Summer (DST): UTC−4 (EDT)
- GNIS feature ID: 1499938

Rectortown is a small unincorporated village and census designated place (CDP) in Fauquier County, Virginia, United States. As of the 2020 census, Rectortown had a population of 121.

The Rectortown Historic District was listed on the National Register of Historic Places in 2004.

== Demographics ==
Rectortown first appeared as a census designated place in the 2020 U.S. census.
