= Battle of Upperville =

Battle of the American Civil War

Coordinates: 38.9851°N 77.8343°W

- Part of the American Civil War
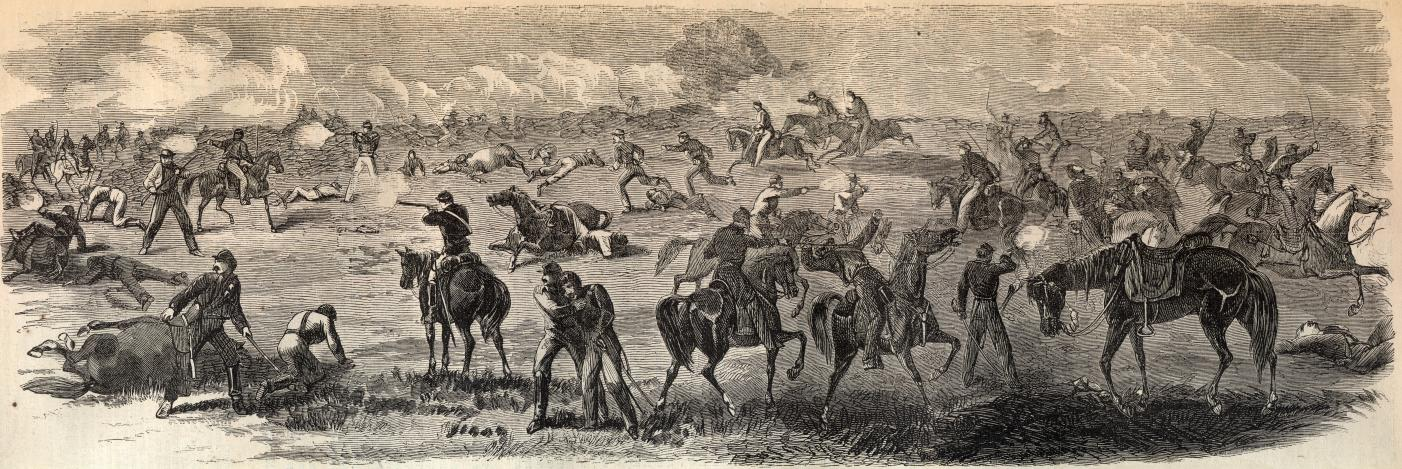
- The Battle of Upperville: Harper's Weekly, July 18, 1863
Date	June 21, 1863
Location	Loudoun County, Virginia
Result	Inconclusive

Belligerents
United States (Union)	(Confederate States of America) CSA (Confederacy)

Commanders and leaders
Alfred Pleasonton; Strong Vincent	Wade Hampton; Beverly Robertson

Strength
2 cavalry divisions 1 infantry brigade	4 cavalry brigades

Casualties and losses
209	180

The Battle of Upperville took place in Loudoun County, Virginia on June 21, 1863, during the Gettysburg campaign of the American Civil War.

== Background ==
The Union cavalry made a determined effort to pierce Confederate Maj. Gen. J.E.B. Stuart's cavalry screen. Stuart had been fighting a series of delaying actions in the Loudoun Valley, hoping to keep Union General Alfred Pleasonton's cavalry from discovering the location of the main body of Robert E. Lee's Army of Northern Virginia, much of which was in the Shenandoah Valley just west of the small village of Upperville. Stuart had slowed the Federals in fighting at Aldie and Middleburg, using ravines, creeks, and stonewalls to his advantage as he slowly withdrew westward. He made another determined stand near Upperville and succeeded in preventing the Federal cavalry from entering the Shenandoah Valley.

== Goose Creek ==
Following the fighting at Middleburg on June 19, a heavy rainstorm during the night had soaked the Loudoun Valley, ending a six-week drought. In the downpour, Wade Hampton's brigade of Confederate cavalry had reinforced J.E.B. Stuart and was deployed near Beverly Robertson's brigade along the Ashby's Gap Turnpike. John R. Chambliss's brigade moved northward and joined "Grumble" Jones near Unison, Virginia. Thomas T. Munford's brigade was still farther north, guarding access to the Snickersville Gap. John Mosby's partisan rangers scouted the Union positions and provided much needed intelligence on their movements.

Union cavalry commander Alfred Pleasonton, frustrated by Stuart's excellent usage of dismounted cavalry hiding behind stone walls, on June 20 asked for and received infantry support from Maj. Gen. George G. Meade's V Corps. Pleasonton had still not located Lee's main body, a task that the War Department continued to prod him to accomplish. Trying to maneuver Stuart out of position, Pleasonton sent Judson Kilpatrick's brigade along the Ashby's Gap Turnpike, supported by Col. Strong Vincent's brigade of infantry, with David McM. Gregg's cavalry division in reserve. John Buford's division would try to turn the flank.

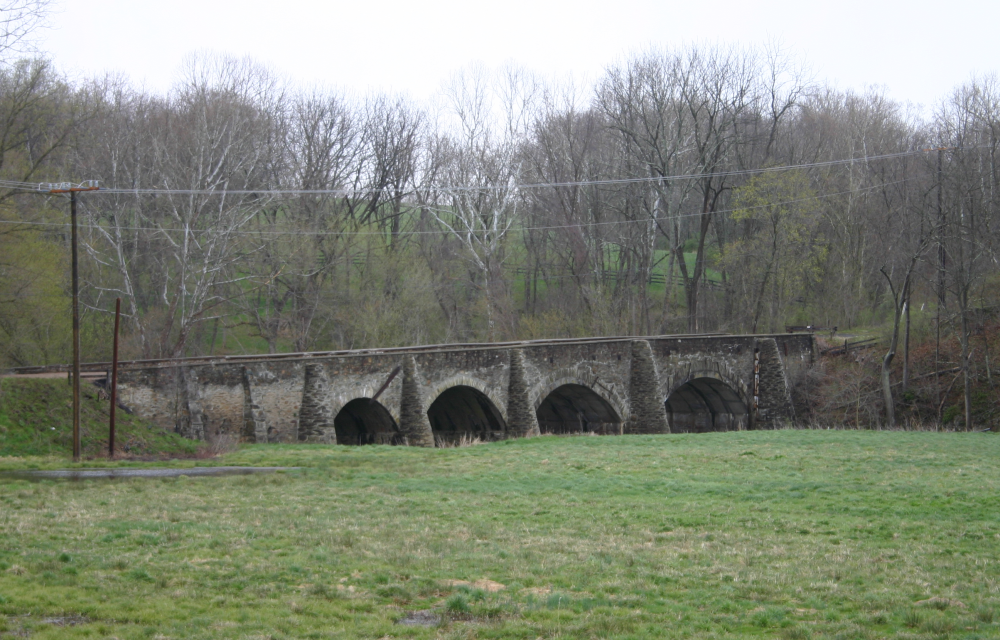
Goose Creek Bridge in Loudoun County, Virginia, north of U.S. Route 50, east of Upperville

Stuart, determined to rest his weary men on the Sabbath, did not get his wish, as Federal artillery opened up on his position around 8:00 a.m. on June 21. After initially holding off Kilpatrick's cavalry, Stuart, effectively using stone walls and steep ravines and creeks, began to fall back under pressure from the Union infantry. He made a stand west of the hamlet of Rector's Crossroads along the stone bridge over Goose Creek, where for two more hours he was able to withstand repeated Federal attacks from mounted cavalry, as well as the 16th Michigan Infantry, which sent skirmishers and sharpshooters forward to pick off the Confederate gunners.

Ahead of the advancing Union soldiers, the Confederate artillerymen hooked up their guns to their teams and raced off, but a Blakely rifle flipped over as its crew hurried to get away. The gun was captured, the first artillery piece ever lost by Stuart's cavalry. However, with two of his three remaining guns soon also disabled, Stuart withdrew and headed westward toward Upperville, still fighting delaying actions where favorable.

== Upperville ==
John Buford's Federal column had detoured to attack the new Confederate left flank near Upperville, while J. Irvin Gregg's and Judson Kilpatrick's brigades advanced from the east along the Ashby's Gap Turnpike. Buford soon encountered "Grumble" Jones and Chambliss's Confederate brigades, escorting Stuart's supply train just north of Upperville, and attacked. Meanwhile, Kilpatrick's troopers attacked Hampton and Robertson on a ridgeline east of Upperville known as Vineyard Hill. Some of the Union cavalrymen made it as far as the village before being repulsed.

After furious mounted fighting, Stuart finally withdrew to take a strong defensive position in Ashby's Gap, even as Confederate infantry began crossing the Potomac River into Maryland. As cavalry skirmishing diminished in the next few days, Stuart made the fateful decision to strike east and make a circuit of the Union army as it marched toward Gettysburg.

Upperville was significant in that Stuart's successful delaying tactics prevented Pleasonton from making an accurate assessment of the location of Lee's infantry divisions, thereby depriving the Federals of much valued intelligence of their enemy's whereabouts and objectives.

== Battlefield preservation ==
The American Battlefield Trust and its partners have preserved 1,004 acres (4.06 km^{2}) of the battlefield by acquisition or conservation easement as of mid-2023.
