= Thomas Devin =

United States Army officer (1822–1878)

Thomas Casimer Devin
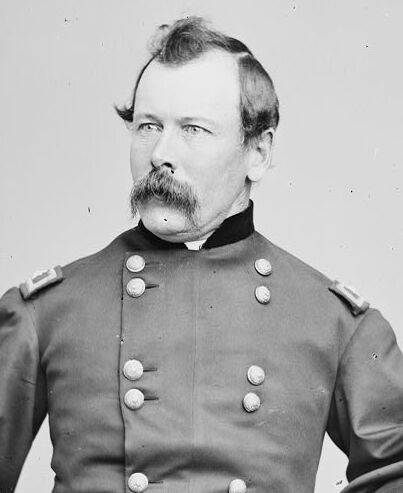
- Gen. T.C. Devin
- Born: December 10, 1822; New York City, US
- Died: April 4, 1878 (aged 55); New York City, US
- Burial place: West Point Cemetery
- Military career
- Allegiance: United States; Union
- Branch: United States Army; Union Army
- Service years: 1861–1878
- Rank: Brigadier General; Brevet Major General
- Nickname: Buford's Hard Hitter
- Commands: 6th New York Cavalry; 2nd Bde, 1st Div, Cav Corps; 1st Division, Cavalry Corps; 3rd U.S. Cavalry
- Conflicts: American Civil War; Battle of Antietam; Battle of Chancellorsville; Battle of Gettysburg; Valley Campaigns of 1864; American Indian Wars

Thomas Casimer Devin (December 10, 1822 – April 4, 1878) was a United States Army officer and general. He commanded Union cavalry during the American Civil War and during the Indian Wars.

== Early life ==
Born in New York City to Irish immigrant parents, Devin was a house painter and partner in a paint and varnish company with his brother John for much of his early life, while also serving as a lieutenant colonel in the New York State Militia.

== Civil War ==
After the start of the Civil War, Devin formed his militia cavalry company into "Captain Devin's Independent Company" and served as its captain. Late that year, he became Colonel of the 6th New York Volunteer Cavalry, nicknamed the "2nd Ira Harris Guards", which he would lead for the next year.

The regiment's first important service was in the Maryland Campaign of 1862. At the Battle of Antietam, one of its squadrons was involved in the first attacks of the day. At the Battle of Fredericksburg, Devin inherited command of David McMurtrie Gregg's cavalry brigade, when the latter took charge of the brigade of George Dashiell Bayard, who had been killed by Confederate artillery fire.

At the Battle of Chancellorsville in 1863, his small brigade was the only cavalry not detached for Brig. Gen. George Stoneman's raid and he successfully led three Union Corps on the stealthy flanking march that preceded the battle. The men of the brigade repeatedly distinguished themselves in the heavy fighting of the battle. They suffered almost 200 casualties in the battle, higher losses than Union cavalry units had seen prior to that time.

Devin also led his brigade in the Battle of Brandy Station (June 9, 1863), and took command of Brig. Gen. John Buford's division while Buford commanded the entire right wing of the two-pronged attack on Confederate cavalry. While observing the skirmish line early in the fighting, Devin had his horse shot out from under him.

At the Battle of Gettysburg, Devin's brigade served in Brig. Gen. Buford's cavalry division that began the battle on July 1, 1863. Devin had become a favorite of Buford's and his rugged leadership style lent him the nickname "Buford's Hard Hitter," while his own men like to refer to him as "Uncle Tommy".

As the Confederate attacks began, Devin's brigade was screening the northwest and northern road approaches to Gettysburg, and successfully delayed the arrival of Jubal A. Early's division. Friendly fire from Union artillery on Cemetery Hill caused most of his brigade to withdraw into the town of Gettysburg and they later skirmished with the Confederates as they entered the town.

The two brigades of Buford's cavalry division present on the field on July 1 and 2 were withdrawn from the battlefield by Cavalry Corps commander Alfred Pleasonton on the afternoon of July 2.

After Gettysburg, Devin continued to command a brigade and sometimes a division in the Cavalry Corps of the Army of the Potomac. In the spring of 1864, he participated in the raid on Richmond by Judson Kilpatrick's cavalry. In August he accompanied the Cavalry Corps to the Shenandoah Valley, where they fought under Maj. Gen. Philip Sheridan during the Valley Campaigns of 1864.

Devin was wounded once during the war, a wound in the foot on August 16, 1864, at the fighting at the Battle of Guard Hill, Virginia. Wesley Merritt became the Cavalry Corps commander, Devin inherited command of his division.

On November 19, 1864, President Abraham Lincoln appointed Devin brigadier general of volunteers for his part in the Battle of Cedar Creek, to rank from October 19, 1864. The President submitted the nomination on December 12, 1864, and the U.S. Senate confirmed it on February 14, 1865.

Devin was mustered out of the volunteer service on January 15, 1866. On January 13, 1866, President Andrew Johnson nominated Devin for appointment to the brevet grade of major general of volunteers, to rank from March 13, 1865, and the U.S. Senate confirmed the appointment on March 12, 1866. President Johnson also appointed Devin brevet colonel in the regular army for Fisher's Hill, to rank from March 2, 1867. On March 26, 1867, President Johnson nominated Devin for appointment to the brevet grade of brigadier general in the regular army for Sayler's Creek, to rank from March 2, 1867, and the U.S. Senate confirmed the appointment on April 5, 1867.

== Postbellum career ==
Devin obtained a commission in the Regular Army after the Civil War under the provisions of the Army Act of 1866. This Act required that the officer ranks of the new infantry and cavalry regiments be filled by a certain percentage of officers from the Volunteer regiments raised during the Civil War. Ending the war as a Brigadier General and Brevet Major General, Devin became a Lieutenant Colonel and was assigned to the 8th U.S. Cavalry.

Initially serving with part of the regiment at Benicia Barracks, California and Fort Churchill, Nevada, Devin assumed command of the Subdistrict of Prescott in Arizona in January 1868. He commanded the District of Arizona at Tucson for a time. In 1870 the 8th U. S. Cavalry was transferred to New Mexico. Devin served at Fort Selden and Fort Bayard until early 1876 when the regiment was transferred to Texas. On June 25, 1877 Devin was promoted to colonel of the 3rd U. S. Cavalry. In October 1877, while on leave, he was one of the eight pallbearers at the funeral of George Armstrong Custer, along with Joseph B. Kiddoo and Randolph B. Marcy.

Devin died at his home in New York City, on sick leave from active duty, as Colonel of the 3rd U.S. Cavalry on April 4, 1878. Devin was initially interred in Calvary Cemetery on Long Island, but upon his wife's death in 1897, both were interred in West Point Cemetery (West Point, New York), near his old friend and commander John Buford.

== Memorialization ==
On June 30, 1878, the United States Army established a temporary camp in southeastern Montana Territory during the building of the Fort Keogh-Deadwood Telegraph Line. The post was named "Camp Devin." It served as a base for part of the 9th U.S. Infantry until being abandoned later that year.

== In popular media ==
Devin was portrayed by David Carpenter in the 1993 film Gettysburg, based on Michael Shaara's novel, The Killer Angels.

== See also ==
- List of American Civil War generals (Union)
