= List of gaps of Virginia =

This is a list of gaps in Virginia.

== By mountain range ==
This list is arranged by mountain ranges.

=== Appalachian Mountains ===
- Hoop Petticoat Gap, elevation 860 feet, on U.S. Route 50 in Virginia to Romney
- Paddy Gap in Paddy Mountain, elevation 1,400 feet,
- Brocks Gap in Little North Mountain, elevation 1,020 feet, on Virginia State Route 259 to North Mountain
- Dry River Gap on U.S. Route 33 in Virginia to Harrisonburg-Franklin
- Buffalo Gap on Virginia State Route 42 to Clifton Forge
- Goshen Pass on the Maury River
- Allison Gap, Virginia on Poor Valley Road 613, Smyth County
- East Stone Gap, Virginia on Orby Cantrell Highway or U.S. Route 58 Alternate
- Big Stone Gap, Virginia
- Olinger Gap north of Low Gap near Old Still Hollow
- Low Gap east of Scott Gap
- Scott Gap east of Dalton Gap
- Dalton Gap north of Pennington Gap
- Pennington Gap on U.S. Route 421 near Pennington Gap, Virginia
- Low Gap near Mullins Ridge south of U.S. Route 58 in Virginia
- Hunter Gap on Virginia Route 70
- Mulberry Gap or Fitts Gap on Mulberry Gap Road
- Jones Gap on Virginia-Tennessee border west of Phoebe Butt
- Bow Gap east of Yellow Rock
- Cranks Gap west of Yellow Rock
- Hubbard Springs Gap on Virginia-Kentucky border near Hubbard Springs, Virginia
- Hubbard Gap near Hubbard Springs, Virginia
- Harris Gap on Virginia-Kentucky border near Hubbard Springs, Virginia
- Brierfield Gap on Virginia-Kentucky border near Hagan, Virginia
- Maple's Gap on the Wise County/Scott County border
- Middleton Gap north of Falling Waters Gap
- Falling Waters Gap on Virginia-Kentucky border north of Rose Hill, Virginia
- Cumberland Gap, elevation 1,600 feet, central feature of Cumberland Gap National Historical Park
- Chadwell Gap on Virginia-Kentucky border in Cumberland Gap National Historical Park
- Butchers Gap on Virginia-Kentucky border in Cumberland Gap National Historical Park
- Pound Gap, elevation 2,392 feet, on U.S. Route 23
- Panther Gap in Mill Mountain, where Virginia State Route 39 goes between Bath and Rockbridge County near the town of Goshen

=== Blue Ridge Mountains ===
This list of Virginia Blue Ridge gaps is listed starting from north to south.

- Potomac Water Gap, elevation 240 feet, Harpers Ferry, on U.S. Route 340
- Keyes Gap, originally Vestal's Gap, elevation 895 feet, on Virginia State Route 9 in Loudoun County
- Wilson Gap, also Gregory Gap, elevation 1440 feet, in Loudoun County
- Snickers Gap, originally William's Gap in 1769, on Virginia State Route 7
- Ashby's Gap, elevation 1,100 feet, on U.S. Route 50
- Manassas Gap, also known as Markham's Gap and Calmese Gap, elevation 950 feet, on U.S. Route 55 and Interstate 66
- Chester Gap, also known as Happy Creek Gap, elevation 1,339 feet, on U.S. Route 522
- Elkwallow Gap, elevation 2,455 feet on Skyline Drive
- Thornton Gap, elevation 2,460 feet, on U.S. Route 211
- Hughes River Gap north of Little Stony Man
- Fishers Gap, elevation 3,070 feet, on Skyline Drive
- Hawksbill Gap, elevation 3,360 feet
- Pine Hill Gap east southeast of Hot Mountain
- Turkeypen Gap south of Breedlove Knob
- Laurel Gap east northeast of Bootens Gap
- Bootens Gap between Powell Mountain and Jones Mountain
- Swift Run Gap on U.S. Route 33
- Smith Roach Gap northeast of Roundtop on Skyline Drive
- Powell Gap on Skyline Drive north of Flattop Mountain
- Simmons Gap between Weaver Mountain and Flattop Mountain near Simmons Gap, Virginia, Greene County
- Browns Gap
- Black Rock Gap
- Jarmans Gap near Waynesboro
- Rockfish Gap (also known as Afton Gap) on Interstate 64
- Reeds Gap on VA 664 (Reeds Gap Road)
- Tye River Gap on Virginia State Route 56
- Indian/White's Gap on U.S. Route 60
- Petites Gap (Elevation 2,369 Feet)
- James River Gorge
- Bearwallow Gap on Blue Ridge Parkway
- Black Horse Gap on Blue Ridge Parkway
- Buford's Gap on U.S. Route 460
- Adney Gap on U.S. Route 221
- Volunteer Gap at Fancy Gap, Virginia elevation 2,672 feet on Blue Ridge Parkway Mile Post 193
- Pipers Gap on Virginia State Route 97
- Mikes Gap south of Gleaves Road near Ewing Mountain
- Dry Run Gap on Grayson Turnpike or U.S. Route 21 in Virginia
- Blue Spring Gap near Comers Rock Road
- Flat Ridge Gap south of Blue Spring Gap
- Dickey Gap at intersection of Mt. Rogers Scenic Byway Virginia State Route 16 and Comers Creek Road
- Massie Gap near Mount Rogers
- Rhododendron Gap near Mount Rogers
- Deep Gap west of Mount Rogers
- Bear Tree Gap on J.E.B Stuart Highway aka U.S. Route 58
- McQueen Gap south of Chestnut Mountain on Virginia-Tennessee border

==== Short Hill Mountain ====
- Hillsboro Gap, Hillsboro on Route 9

=== Bull Run Mountains ===
- Hopewell Gap on Hopewell Road
- Thoroughfare Gap (Bull Run Mountain) on I-66

=== Catoctin Mountain ===
- Clarks Gap

=== Massanutten Mountain ===
- Edinburg Gap, Edinburg Gap Road
- Taskers Gap, between Mertins Rock and Bowman Mountain
- Mooreland Gap, VA Route 730, Shenandoah County
- New Market Gap, elevation 1800 feet, on U.S. Route 211
- Roaring Run Gap, south of Short Horse Mountain
- Fridley Gap, north of Fourth Mountain
- Little Gap, north of Hartman Knob
- Runkles Gap, north of Hartman Knob
- Harshberger Gap, near Massanutten Peak

=== Southwest Mountains ===
- Turkeysag Gap
- Stony Point Pass
