= Between the Hills =

Valley in Virginia, United States

- Location within Northern Virginia Location within Virginia Location within the United States
- Floor elevation: 500 ft (150 m)
- Length: 11 miles (18 km) North-South
- Width: 2 miles (3.2 km)

Geography
- Location: Loudoun County, Virginia
- Population centers: Neersville
- Borders on: Short Hill Mountain (east); Blue Ridge Mountain (west); Potomac River (north); South Fork Catoctin Creek (south)
- Coordinates: 39°15′N 77°44′W
- Topo map: USGS, Round Hill
- Traversed by: Virginia Route 9
- Interactive map of Between the Hills

Between the Hills is a small valley in northwest Loudoun County, Virginia, distinct from, but associated with, the greater Loudoun Valley.

== Geography ==
The Between the Hills valley encompasses the area of Loudoun that lies west of Short Hill Mountain and east of the Blue Ridge Mountain. The area includes the communities of Neersville and Loudoun Heights.

Between the Hills can be divided into two sections; the upper and lower valley. The upper valley encompasses the area north of the Hillsboro Gap in the Short Hill, while the lower valley encompasses the area south of the gap. The valley ranges from 2.5 miles (4.0 km) wide at its largest, just south of the Hillsboro gap to 1.4 miles (2.3 km) wide at its smallest, east of Purcell Knob in the upper valley and is approximately 11 miles (18 km) long.

The main waterways of Between the Hills are the North Fork of Catoctin Creek, which drains the lower valley before flowing through the Hillsboro gap into the Catoctin Valley, and Piney Run, which drains the upper valley and flows north through the valley directly into the Potomac River.

Across the Potomac River, the valley continues as Pleasant Valley in Maryland.

=== Transportation ===
State Route 671, Harpers Ferry Road, is the main road in the valley, running north–south through the upper valley from its southern terminus at Virginia State Route 9, Charles Town Pike, west of Hillsboro, to its northern terminus at U.S. Route 340, south of the Sandy Hook bridge over the Potomac River and east of Harpers Ferry. State Route 719, Stony Point-Woodgrove road runs north–south through the lower valley from Hillsboro to Woodgrove. The Charlestown pike bisects the valley, running southeast–northwest from the Hillsboro Gap to Keyes Gap in the Blue Ridge.

== Geology ==
The Between the Hills Valley was formed by action along the Short Hill fault during the early Paleozoic era, which resulted in separation of the underlying rocks of the Blue Ridge and Short Hill mountains, which were deposited during the Catoctin Formation of the late Proterozoic period and uplifted during the Grenville Orogeny. Reactivation of the fault during the Alleghenian Orogeny caused further separation of underlying rock deposited during the middle and late Paleozoic era.

== History ==
During the American Civil War, a Between the Hills resident, John Mobberly, gained notoriety as a Confederate guerrilla. During the last two years of the war, he successfully disputed control of the area through his daring exploits, until his assassination outside of Neersville in April 1865. In late November-early December 1864 much of the Between the Hills valley was put to the torch by Union cavalry during The Burning Raid, including Potts Mill, the ruins of which can be seen from off Stony Point Road. Confederate partisan John Mosby and his Rangers suffered their first defeat in the valley and along the eastern slopes of the Blue Ridge in the Battle of Loudoun Heights, fought on January 1, 1864.
