= Virginia State Route 287 =

State highway in Loudoun County, Virginia, US

State Route 287
- Berlin Turnpike

Route information
- Maintained by VDOT
- Length: 12.71 mi (20.45 km)
- Existed: 1944–present

Major junctions
- South end: SR 7 Bus. in Purcellville
- SR 7 in Purcellville; SR 9 in Wheatland
- North end: MD 17 near Lovettsville

Location
- Country: United States
- State: Virginia
- Counties: Loudoun

Highway system
- Virginia Routes; Interstate; US; Primary; Secondary; Byways; History; HOT lanes
← SR 286	→ SR 288

State Route 287 (SR 287) is a primary state highway in the U.S. state of Virginia. Known as Berlin Pike, the state highway runs 12.71 miles (20.45 km) from SR 7 Business in Purcellville north to the Maryland state line at the Potomac River near Lovettsville, where the highway continues as Maryland Route 17 (MD 17). SR 287 is the main north–south highway of the Catoctin Valley of northern Loudoun County.

== Route description ==
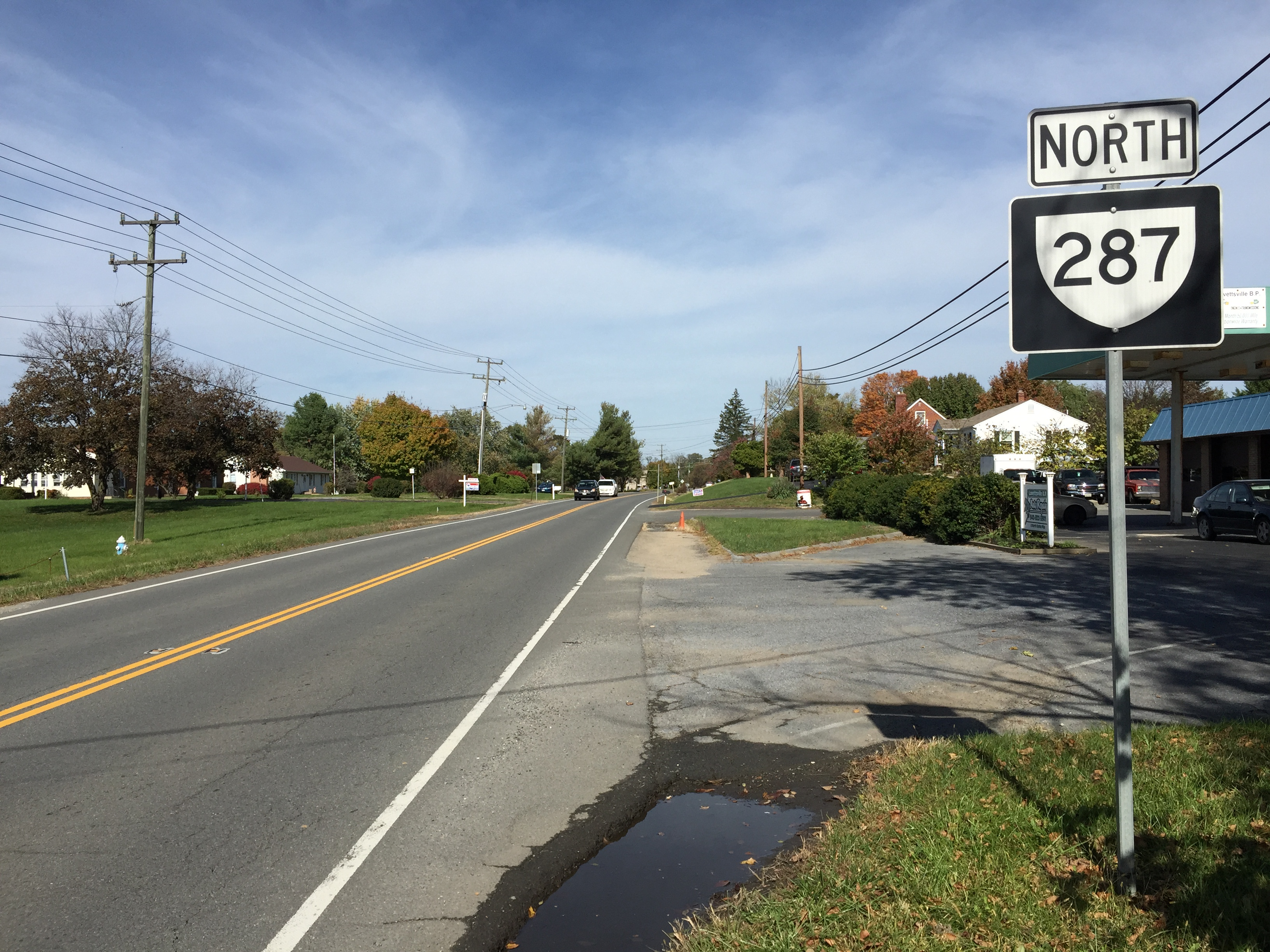
View north along SR 287 in Lovettsville

SR 287 begins at a roundabout with SR 7 Business (Main Street) on the east side of Purcellville. The state highway heads north as a two-lane undivided road that passes between a residential subdivision and Patrick Henry College. At the north town limit of Purcellville, SR 287 meets SR 7 (Harry Byrd Highway) at a diamond interchange. Within this interchange, SR 287 parallels the Washington and Old Dominion Trail, whose western terminus is in Purcellville. The rail trail intersects the highway on its way east toward Leesburg immediately north of the interchange. SR 287 heads north through a mix of farmland and houses on large lots, crossing the South Fork of Catoctin Creek. In the hamlet of Wheatland, the state highway intersects SR 9 and crosses the North Fork of Catoctin Creek. SR 287 passes to the east of Morrisonville and crosses over Milltown Creek on its way to Lovettsville. At the southern town limit, Loudoun Street continues straight along the highway's alignment while SR 287 veers slightly northwest. In the center of the town, SR 287 joins SR 673 (Broadway) in a concurrency as a one-way street around Lovettsville's town square. North of Lovettsville, the state highway has a curvy alignment as it descends toward the Potomac River. SR 287 reaches its northern terminus at the Maryland state line on the river's south bank. The roadway continues north across the Brunswick Bridge as MD 17 into the town of Brunswick (formerly Berlin).

== Major intersections ==
The entire route is in Loudoun County.

Location	mi	km	Destinations	Notes
Purcellville	0.00	0.00	SR 7 Bus. (Main Street) / W.T. Druhan Jr. Boulevard – Purcellville	roundabout
	0.55	0.89	SR 7 (Harry Byrd Highway) – Round Hill, Winchester, Leesburg	Diamond interchange
Wheatland	3.76	6.05	SR 9 (Charles Town Pike) – Hillsboro, Leesburg	
Lovettsville	10.27– 10.38	16.53– 16.70	SR 673 (Broad Way)	traffic circle around town square
	12.71	20.45	MD 17 north – Brunswick	Maryland state line at Brunswick Bridge over Potomac River
1.000 mi = 1.609 km; 1.000 km = 0.621 mi

< SR 720	District 7 State Routes; 1928–1933	SR 722 >
