= Catoctin Valley =

Valley in Loudoun County, Virginia, US

- Location within Virginia
- Floor elevation: 500
- Length: 11 miles (18 km) North-South
- Width: 7 miles (11 km)
- Area: 77 square miles (20,000 ha)

Geography
- Location: Loudoun County, Virginia
- Population centers: Lovettsville; Waterford
- Borders on: Catoctin Mountain (east); Short Hill Mountain(west); Potomac River (north)
- Coordinates: 39°14′N 77°38′W
- Traversed by: Virginia Route 287
- Interactive map of Catoctin Valley

The Catoctin Valley is a small valley, geographically and culturally associated with the larger Loudoun Valley in Loudoun County, Virginia.

== Geography ==
The Catoctin Valley encompasses the northern part of the Loudoun Valley east of the Short Hill Mountain and west of Catoctin Mountain. Its northern border is the Potomac River, while its southern border is an intangible line running from the southern terminus of the Short Hill to the base of Catoctin Mountain, located approximately two miles north of Virginia State Route 7. Across the Potomac in Maryland, the valley continues on as the Middletown Valley, which historically has also been known as the Catoctin Valley.

The valley contains the communities of Waterford, Lovettsville, Wheatland, Morrisonville and Taylorstown.

The valley is approximately 7 miles (11 km) wide east to west and 11 miles (18 km) long north to south.

The valley is drained by the Catoctin Creek and its tributaries.

== Transportation ==
Virginia State Route 287, the Berlin Turnpike, is the major road through the valley, running north–south from the Potomac River to Virginia State Route 7. Virginia State Route 9 runs east–west across the very southern portion of the valley.

== History ==
The valley was settled in the 1730s by German and Quaker immigrants who migrated south from southern Pennsylvania. They established small self-sufficient farms centered on small mill villages. They brought with them and employed few if any slaves. This region of Loudoun stood in stark contrast to the southern Loudoun Valley and areas east of the Catoctin Mountain, where plantation-style farming was established by English settlers moving north out of Tidewater Virginia. During the American Civil War, due to the people's reluctance to use slaves and their strong economic ties to Maryland, this area of Loudoun was strongly Unionist in sentiment. As a result, early in the war, fierce partisan fighting broke out between the area's Unionist soldiers, the Loudoun Rangers and the county's pro-Confederate soldiers, at The Fight at Waterford.
