= Burning Raid =

1864 Union raid during American Civil War

Coordinates: 39°6.84′N 77°41.708′W

- Part of the American Civil War
- "The Burning" in Loudoun County
Date	November 28–December 2, 1864
Location	The Loudoun Valley of Virginia
Result	Union victory

Belligerents
United States of America	Confederate States of America

Commanders and leaders
Wesley Merritt	John S. Mosby

Strength
3 000	unknown

Casualties and losses
none	Animals killed 5 000-6 000 cattle 3 000-4 000 sheep 500-700 horses 1 000 pigs Buildings burnt 230 barns 8 mills 1 distillery Crops burnt 9 100 kg of hay 680 kg of grain Human casualties 12 prisoners

The Burning Raid was a Union raid conducted in the Loudoun Valley of Loudoun and Fauquier counties in Virginia in 1864 during the American Civil War. It was aimed at destroying the forage on which Confederate partisans operating in the area, specifically Mosby's Rangers, subsisted as well as at breaking the will of the citizens of the area for supporting the partisans.

== Planning of the raid ==
During the Valley Campaigns of 1864, while General Philip Sheridan drove up the Shenandoah Valley he faced a significant threat to his rear and supply lines from Mosby's Rangers based east of the Blue Ridge in Loudoun and Fauquier. Subsequently, he was forced to dedicate significant resources to protecting his rear. Furthermore, Mosby and other partisans in Loudoun routinely raided Union garrisons in Fairfax County and along the Potomac River in Maryland.

In order to limit this threat, General Grant wrote to Sheridan on August 16 suggesting:

If you can possibly spare a division of Cavalry, send them through Loudoun County and destroy and carry off all the crops, animals, negroes, and all men under fifty years of age capable of bearing arms. In this way you will get many of Mosby's men. All male citizens under fifty can be fairly held as prisoners of war, not as citizen prisoners. If not already soldiers, they will be made so the moment the rebel army gets hold of them.

At the time, Sheridan was still battling Jubal Early for control of the valley and could not spare a large force for the task. On the 20th he dispatched 650 troopers of the 8th Illinois Cavalry into Loudoun to "break up and exterminate any bands or parties of Mosby's [Elijah V.] White's, or other guerrillas which may be met", but the troopers were unable to find and capture the elusive partisans.

The failure of Sheridan to deal with Mosby did not go unnoticed by Grant, who wrote him again on November 9, insisting:

There is no doubt about the necessity of clearing out that country so it will not support Mosby's gang... So long as the war lasts they must be prevented from raising another crop.

Though Sheridan had by then defeated Early's army in late October at the Battle of Cedar Creek, he feared such action might agitate anti-war advocates and negatively impact the reelection of Abraham Lincoln. In late November, with Lincoln's reelection assured, Sheridan decided he could finally safely conduct operations against Mosby. On the 26th he wrote Union Chief of Staff Henry Halleck, likening his plans for Loudoun to The Burning of the Valley he was then conducting:

Now there is going to be an intense hatred of [Mosby] in that portion of the Valley which is nearly desert. I will soon commence on Loudoun County, and let them know there is a God in Israel.

The following day he ordered Major General Wesley Merritt and his 1st Cavalry Division to Loudoun:

You are hereby directed to proceed, to-morrow morning at 7 o'clock, with the two brigades of your division now in camp, to the east side of the Blue Ridge, via Ashby's Gap, and operate against the guerrillas in the district of country bounded on the south by the line of the Manassas Gap Railroad as far east as White Plains, on the east by the Bull Run Range, on the west by the Shenandoah River, and on the north by the Potomac... To clear the country of these parties that are bringing destruction upon the innocent, as well as their guilty supporters, by their cowardly acts, you will consume and destroy all forage and subsistence, burn all barns and mills and their contents, and drive off all livestock in the region, the boundaries of which are described above. This order must be literally executed, bearing in mind, however, that no dwellings are to be burned and that no personal violence be offered the citizens...

== The raid ==
On the morning of the 28th, Merritt's 1st Cavalry Division set out for Ashby's Gap in the Blue Ridge and by midday had crossed the mountain and arrived at Paris. The 1st Brigade under Colonel Peter Stagg was dispatched south to Piedmont Station (present day Delaplane) and Markham, while the 2nd Brigade under Brigadier General Thomas Devin covered the area between Paris and Upperville. Late that evening the two brigades reunited in Upperville, where they spent the night.

The following morning, the 1st Brigade again headed south, through Rectortown, Salem (present day Marshall), White Plains (present day The Plains) and then up to Middleburg. The 2nd Brigade operated between Upperville and Snickersville (present day Bluemont) along the foot of the Blue Ridge. Around midday, at the later location, the Reserve Brigade met up with the 1st, bringing the total number of Federals in the county to 3,000.

On the 30th, the 1st Brigade set out east on the Ashby's Gap Pike from Middleburg to Aldie. At the latter village they then turned northwest up the Snickersville Turnpike through Philomont, and Union (present day Unison). Meanwhile, the 2nd Brigade set out east on the Winchester pike from Snickersville through Purcellville and Harmony (present day Hamilton). They then turned to the north into the heart of Unionist Loudoun via Waterford then up the Catoctin Creek to the Potomac, whereupon they turned west and headed to Lovettsville. The Reserve Brigade set out north from Snickersville through Woodgrove, Hillsborough and Between the Hills valley to the Potomac. They then turned east and met up with the 2nd Brigade at Lovettsville.

The next day the 2nd and Reserve Brigades set out south from Lovettsville through Wheatland back to Purcellville then onto Snickersville. The 1st Brigade meanwhile operated between Philomont and Middleburg, reuniting with the 2nd and Reserve a Snickersville that evening. The following morning, with the entire valley devastated, the Federals left the county via Snickers Gap.

During the raid, Mosby did not call out the Rangers as the Federal force was far superior to his and fully expecting an attack by him. Instead the Rangers attempted to help local farmers by driving off their livestock ahead of the Federal columns, often bringing them into areas already put to the torch.

== The damage ==
According to the report of Merritt, which lacked detail, 5000-6000 heads of cattle, 3000-4000 heads of sheep, and 500-700 horses were driven off and 1000 hogs were slaughtered. In the report of the Reserve brigade 230 barns, 8 mills, 1 distillery, 10,000 tons of hay and 25,000 bushels of grain were reported burned.

In the words of Charles Humphreys, who was with the reserve brigade:

Some idea of the general destruction may be formed when I relate that in one day two regiments of our brigade burned more than one hundred and fifty barns, a thousand stacks of hay, and six flour mills, besides having driven off fifty horses and three hundred head of cattle. This was the most unpleasant task we were ever compelled to undertake... It was heart-piercing to hear the shrieks of women and children, and to see even men crying and beating their breasts, supplicating for mercy on bended knees, begging that at least one cow - an only support - might be left. But no mercy was allowed.

So complete was the destruction that neither the county's poor house nor its Unionist citizens were spared. The only notable exception was the mill of James Downey, the county's representative to the House of Representatives of the Restored Government of Virginia and speaker of that body. John Holland's Woolen Mill, which had supplied uniforms to the Union army, was not so fortunate.

Following the war, 208 loyal citizens of Loudoun filed claims with the government for losses from the raid. They claimed $199,228.24 in property damage and $61,821.13 in livestock losses.

The raid also resulted in the capture of 12 Rangers, though did little to stop Mosby or hurt the regard for which most citizens of the Loudoun Valley had for him.

== See also ==
- Loudoun County in the American Civil War
