= John Mobberly =

Confederate American Civil War guerrilla

John W. Mobberly
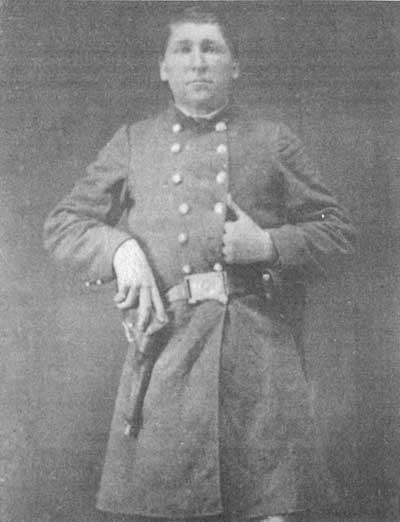
- Military Portrait of John Mobberly
- Born: c. 1844; Loudoun County, Virginia
- Died: April 5, 1865 (aged 20); Loudoun County, Virginia
- Burial place: Neersville, Virginia
- Military career
- Allegiance: Confederate States of America
- Branch: Confederate States Army
- Service years: 1862–65
- Rank: Private
- Unit: Co. A 35th Battalion of Virginia Cavalry
- Conflicts: American Civil War -Battle of Brandy Station -George's Schoolhouse Raid

John W. Mobberly (or Mobley or Morbly; c. 1844 – April 5, 1865) was a Confederate guerrilla who operated in the Loudoun Valley and Between the Hills region of Loudoun County, Virginia during the American Civil War. He also served as regular soldier in Elijah V. White's 35th Battalion, Virginia Cavalry, nicknamed the "Comanches." Mobberly is sometimes reported as serving under John Mosby, although this is not grounded in fact. His legacy is surrounded in controversy as Federal soldiers and Union sympathizers in Loudoun County accused him of committing war atrocities, including slave-rustling, while pro-Southern Loudoun residents claimed him to be a hero, second only to Mosby in local popularity.

== Biography ==
Mobberly was born near Neersville, Virginia around the year 1844. After a year into the American Civil War Mobberly enlisted in Company A of the 35th Battalion at Hillsboro on September 15, 1862. He saw his first significant combat action at the Battle of Brandy Station on June 9, 1863, where he had a horse shot out from under him.

Mobberly, with Mosby's Rangers, fought a May 17, 1864, skirmish with the Loudoun Rangers at Waterford, Mobberly shot a wounded Ranger Charles Stewart several times execution style, drawing ire from Federal sympathizers. Eight days later, he raided Berlin, Maryland (present day Brunswick).

On November 10, in what became known as the Halltown Raid, he attacked a supply wagon en route to Halltown from Charles Town. On the 19th, Mobberly led a charge of the 35th against the pro-Union Swamp Dragoons in central West Virginia.

On January 17, 1865, while serving as a scout, Mobberly led the advance guard in the George's Schoolhouse Raid. His luck ran out on April 5 when Charles Stewart, who survived the wounds inflicted by Mobberly in 1864, and a group of locals and Loudoun Rangers ambushed and killed Mobberly at Luther H. Potterfield's barn outside of Lovettsville. The United States Government gave a $1,000 reward to each of the men who participated in the ambush, which makes Mobberly's death one of the few times the U.S. Government has paid civilians to assassinate an adversary.
