= Loudoun Valley =

Valley in northern Virginia

- The Loudoun Valley as seen from the foot of Blue Ridge Mountain

- Location within Virginia
- Floor elevation: 500 ft (150 m)
- Length: 34 miles (55 km) North to South
- Width: 10 miles (16 km)

Geography
- Location: Loudoun County, Virginia
- Population centers: Purcellville; Middleburg
- Borders on: Catoctin & Bull Run Mountains (east); Blue Ridge Mountain (west); Potomac River (north); Broken Hills (south)
- Coordinates: 39°13′58″N 77°44′06″W
- Traversed by: State Route 7, U.S. Route 50
- Interactive map of Loudoun Valley

The Loudoun Valley is a small, but historically significant valley in the Blue Ridge Mountains located in Loudoun County in Northern Virginia in the United States.

== Geography ==
The lush and fertile valley lies between Catoctin Mountain and the Bull Run Mountains to the east and the Blue Ridge Mountains to the west. To the north it is bound by the Potomac River and to the south by the Broken Hills of Fauquier County. The small portion of the valley residing in Fauquier County is known as Upper Fauquier. The valley varies between 8 miles (13 km) and 12 miles (19 km) in width and is approximately 34 miles (55 km) long. The northern section of the valley is bisected by Short Hill Mountain. The area west of the Short Hill is known as Between the Hills and is distinct from the Loudoun Valley, while the area to the east, sometimes referred to as the Catoctin Valley, is associated with it.

Major watercourses include Goose Creek, Catoctin Creek, Panther Skin Run, and the Little River.

The three major highways across the valley are U.S. Route 50, which runs from Aldie on the east to Ashby Gap on the west; Route 7, which runs from Clarke's Gap west of Leesburg to Snickers Gap west of Bluemont; and Route 9, which diverges from Route 7 at Clarke's Gap and runs west to Keyes Gap on the West Virginia border.

The terrain is rolling, with numerous ridges and hills; the elevation here ranges between 350 and 730 feet (110 and 220 m) above sea level. The soil is formed from gneiss, clay/slate, hornblende, greenstone, and quartz particles, a fertile and durable soil, containing alumina, silex, potash, lime, and other natural fertilizing minerals.

== History ==
=== Settlement ===
Following the 1722 Treaty of Albany, which expelled Indigenous nations west of the Blue Ridge Mountains, white settlers began to occupy the Loudoun Valley. Many of the early white residents were immigrants from southern Pennsylvania—Quakers, Scotch-Irish, and Germans interested in starting small farms. The Quakers had significant influence in the central Loudoun Valley, settling in and around such communities as Waterford, Hillsboro, Goose Creek (now Lincoln), and Union (now Unison). Their stone buildings are a major feature of the Loudoun landscape. Germans settled in the northern end of the Loudoun Valley, especially in the area around Lovettsville, leaving several log structures as their architectural legacy. Unlike the settlers to the east and south, neither of these groups practiced slavery. In the southern portion of the valley, centered on Middleburg, settlers of English descent moving west from the Tidewater region imported slave-based plantation-style agriculture. During the antebellum period, the area became a leading center of agricultural production, particularly of wheat, oats, rye, and corn.

=== Civil War ===
During the Civil War, the Loudoun Valley saw considerable fighting. Owing to the Valley's divided loyalties, one-time neighbors took up arms against one another in bitter partisan fighting. Unionists from the northern portion of the Valley formed the partisan Loudoun Rangers, while southern sympathizers in the southern portion joined several partisan Confederate units, including White's Rebels and Mosby's Rangers. These units frequently engaged one another in the Valley throughout the duration of the war, most noticeably at the Fight at Waterford in 1862 when White's Rebels engaged the Loudoun Rangers for the first time.

Major engagements between the regular armies also occurred in the Valley, particularly in 1862 and 1863. In November 1862, following the Battle of Antietam, Union Gen. George McClellan marched his army through the Valley in slow pursuit of the retreating Army of Northern Virginia. Confederate cavalry under Maj. Gen. J.E.B. Stuart fought a delaying action against the vanguard of the Union columns during the often overlooked Battle of Unison. During the Gettysburg campaign, a series of cavalry clashes between J.E.B. Stuart and Alfred Pleasonton occurred in the valley at Aldie, Middleburg, Goose Creek, and Upperville. Stuart successfully kept the Federal forces from entering the adjacent Shenandoah Valley and discovering Robert E. Lee's main army. In 1864, as General Jubal Early withdrew from Washington, Union forces attacked his supply wagons at Heaton's Crossroads at present-day Purcellville. In the early winter of 1864, General Phillip Sheridan had the Loudoun Valley put to the torch during The Burning Raid in response to the actions of Confederate partisans John Mosby, who used the Loudoun Valley as his base of operations.

=== Modern era ===
Following the war, the Loudoun Valley was slow to recover from the devastation of the Burning Raid, but soon the region became a major source of agricultural products again, particularly notable for its numerous dairy farms. Farming remained a main occupation for several generations until the early 1990s, when urban growth began encroaching from the east. Though farming has lost its prominence in the valley, it maintains a strong presence. Loudoun County ranks twentieth in overall agriculture production in the state. Corn, wheat, and beans remain staple crops, while berry production has increased dramatically (ranked first in the state). Christmas tree farming (third in the state) and livestock (eleventh in the state for sheep and lamb, fourteenth in the state for cattle) are also major agricultural ventures. In the last decade, the emergence of vineyards and wineries in the valley has led to it being a top producer of wine in the state.

== Sources ==
- Loudoun Museum website
- Head, James W., History and Comprehensive Description of Loudoun County Virginia, Parkview Press, 1908.
