= Neersville, Virginia =

Unincorporated community in Virginia, United States

- Unincorporated community
- Location within Northern Virginia Location within Virginia Location within the United States
- Coordinates: 39°15′40″N 77°43′33″W
- Country: United States
- State: Virginia
- County: Loudoun
- Time zone: UTC−5 (Eastern (EST))
  - Summer (DST): UTC−4 (EDT)

Neersville is an unincorporated community in northwestern Loudoun County, Virginia, United States. It is located in the Between the Hills area of the Loudoun Valley on Harpers Ferry Road (Virginia Secondary Route 671) at the foot of Short Hill Mountain. It is notable for being the birthplace of Confederate guerrilla John Mobberly.

== History ==
Neersville derives its name from the Neer brothers, Conrad and William, who were in the 1770s the first to lease and later own the land around the present village . Their land deeds began in 1786. The village began to coalesce around the dependencies of the Near farms in 1834 when the Lutheran Church was given a half acre on which they constructed St. Paul's Church. Within five years, the post office established a branch in the village which they christened Neersville and, with it, the "Capitol City" of Between the Hills was born.

The village continued to prosper in the antebellum years, boasting two mills, a saw and grist, by 1850. Because of the limited flow of Piney Run, only one could operate at a time. The village suffered some during the Civil War, mostly by the burning of the bridge across the Potomac River, which kept the isolated village connected to the Harpers Ferry and the outside world via the B&O Railroad and C&O Canal. Though the village was occupied by both armies during the war, no real fighting took place there.

Following the conflict, the village began to prosper again, especially with the opening of Sagle Road, which cut from the Harpers Ferry Road at the village to the Charles Town Pike (present day Rt. 9) just east of Keyes Gap and the opening of the Nathaniel Prince Road, which led east from the village across the Short Hill, connecting the village to Lovettsville. By 1885 the village even boasted a school.

The 20th century was not so kind to Neersville. The population began to dwindle, the school closed in 1930, the general store closed in 1956 and by October 1970 even St. Paul's had closed its doors. Furthermore Nathaniel Prince Road was not incorporated into the county road system and thus was never graded and maintained for automobile use, thereby cutting off the village from Lovettsville.

Neersville has a voluntary fire department A library bus of the Loundon County library arrives once a month.

== Newspapers ==
- Purcellville Gazette - weekly
