= VA9 =

VA-9 has the following meanings:

- Attack Squadron 9 (U.S. Navy)
- State Route 9 (Virginia)
- Virginia's 9th congressional district
