= Lovettsville air disaster =

1940 aviation accident

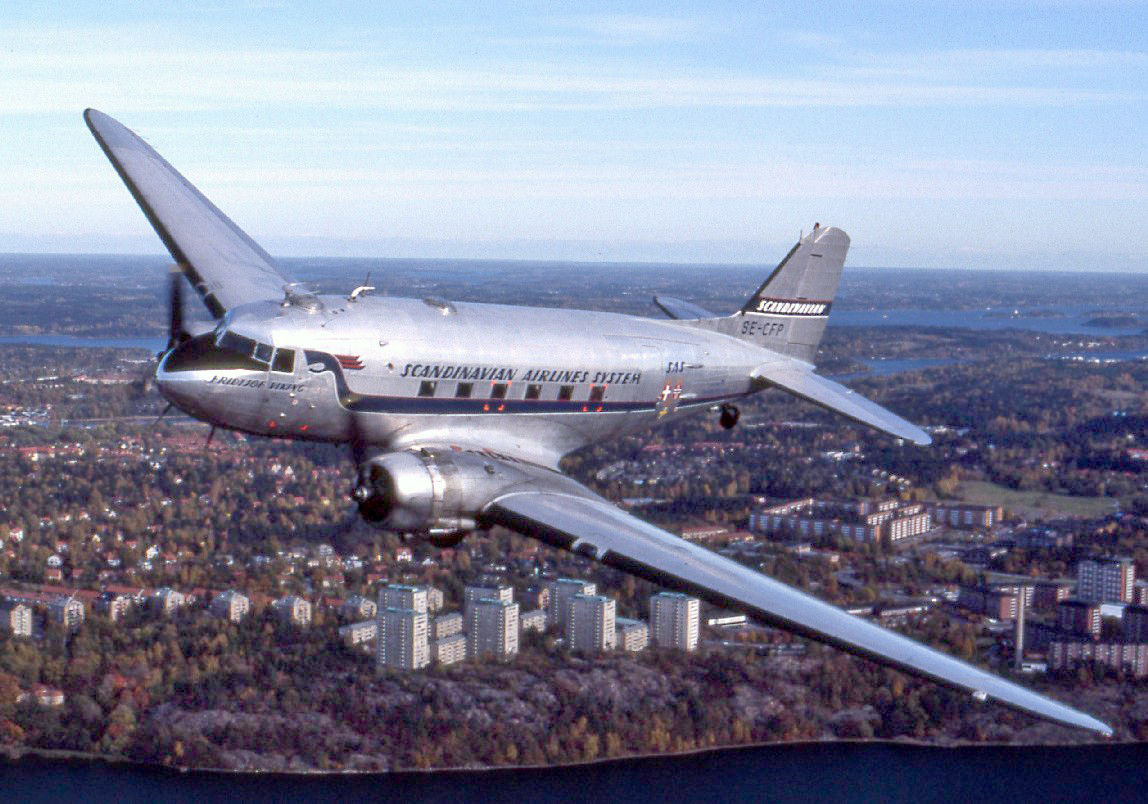
- A DC-3 similar to the accident aircraft

Accident
- Date: August 31, 1940
- Summary: Lightning strike (probable)
- Site: Near Short Hill Mountain, Lovettsville, Virginia; 39°16′24″N 77°41′05″W

Aircraft
- Aircraft type: Douglas DC-3
- Operator: Pennsylvania Central Airlines
- Registration: NC21789
- Flight origin: Washington, D.C.
- Stopover: Pittsburgh, Pennsylvania
- Destination: Detroit, Michigan
- Passengers: 21
- Crew: 4
- Fatalities: 25
- Survivors: 0

On August 31, 1940, Pennsylvania Central Airlines Flight 19, a new Douglas DC-3, was flying from Washington, D.C. to Detroit with a stopover in Pittsburgh. While the aircraft was flying near Lovettsville, Virginia at 6,000 feet (1,800 m) and approaching the West Virginia border, Flight 19 encountered an intense thunderstorm. Numerous witnesses reported seeing a large flash of lightning shortly before it nosed over and plunged to earth in an alfalfa field. With limited accident investigation tools at the time, it was at first believed that the most likely cause was the plane flying into windshear, but the Civil Aeronautics Board report concluded that the probable cause was a lightning strike. U.S. Senator Ernest Lundeen was among the 21 passengers and 4 crew members killed. Also on board were "a Special Agent of the FBI, a second FBI employee, and a prosecutor from the Criminal Division of the U.S. Department of Justice." At the time of the crash, the FBI was investigating Sen. Lundeen's ties to George Sylvester Viereck, a top German agent working in the U.S. to spread pro-Nazi and antisemitic propaganda.

The crash occurred during a severe rainstorm, and recovery efforts were hindered by impassable flooded roads and poor communications: the crash cut the only telephone lines in the area. Wreckage was scattered over a broad area, and it is believed that all aircraft occupants died instantly on impact. At the time, the crash was the deadliest disaster in the history of U.S. commercial aviation.

Flight 19 was under the command of Captain Lowell V. Scroggins with First Officer J. Paul Moore. The pilot and copilot had over eleven thousand and six thousand hours experience respectively, although only a few hundred of those hours were on DC-3s. The aircraft was carrying 21 revenue passengers, a single flight attendant, and a deadheading airline manager riding in the jump seat in the cockpit.

The DC-3A was newly delivered from Douglas Aircraft on May 25, 1940, equipped with twin Curtiss-Wright R-1820 Cyclone 9 engines (also designated as G-102-A).

The CAB investigation of the accident was the first major investigation to be conducted under the Bureau of Air Commerce act of 1938.
