= Mechanicsville, Loudoun County, Virginia =

Unincorporated community in Virginia, United States

- Unincorporated community
- Location within Virginia Location within the United States
- Coordinates: 39°13′11″N 77°44′40″W
- Country: United States of America
- State: Virginia
- County: Loudoun
- Elevation: 600 ft (180 m)
- Time zone: UTC-5 (Eastern (EST))
  - Summer (DST): UTC-4 (EDT)
- Area codes: 571 & 703
- GNIS feature ID: 1499726

Mechanicsville is an unincorporated community in Loudoun County, Virginia, United States. Mechanicsville is located on Virginia Route 9, 2 miles (3.2 km) northwest of Hillsboro.
