= Hillsboro Historic District (Hillsboro, Virginia) =

Historic house in Virginia, United States

- U.S. National Register of Historic Places
- U.S. Historic district
- Virginia Landmarks Register
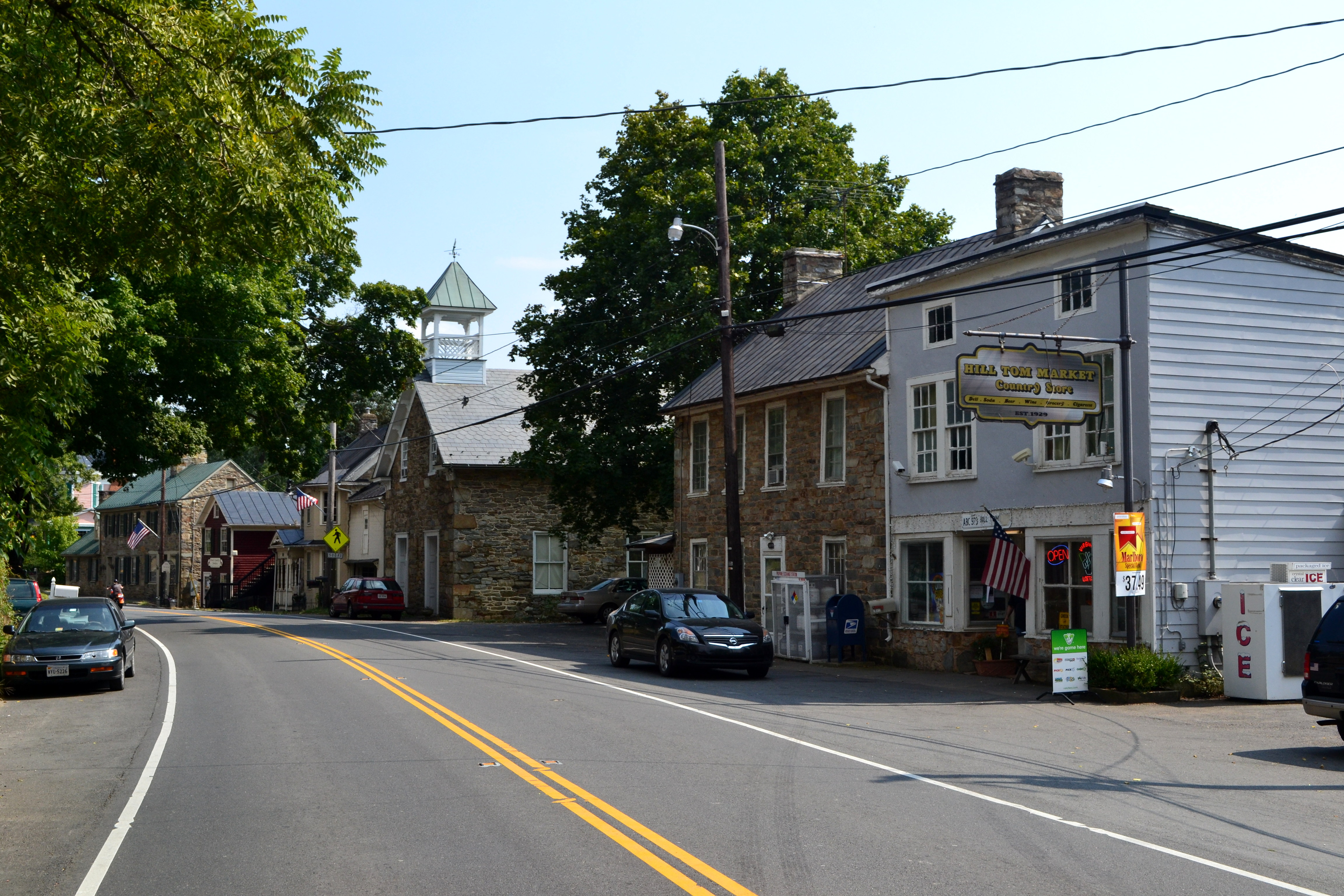

- Location within Northern Virginia Location within Virginia Location within the United States
- Location: VA 9, Hillsboro, Virginia
- Coordinates: 39°11′53″N 77°43′30″W
- Area: 60 acres (24 ha)
- Built: 1802
- Architectural style: Federal
- NRHP reference No.: 79003049
- VLR No.: 236-0040

Significant dates
- Added to NRHP: May 7, 1979
- Designated VLR: September 19, 1978; September 17, 2009

The Hillsboro Historic District in Hillsboro, Virginia is a historic district that was listed on the National Register of Historic Places in 1979. In 1979 it included 40 contributing buildings over its 60-acre (24 ha) area. Hillsboro was established as "The Gap", but in 1802 the town became Hillsborough. In 1880 the present spelling began to be used. Hillsboro is laid out in a roughly linear fashion along Virginia State Route 9 (or Charles Town Pike, as it is used in home addresses in Hillsboro), with lots in the historic district characteristically deep and relatively narrow. The pre-1835 houses in the district are characterized by two-story stone construction with gable roofs. Few new houses were built until the late 19th century, when Victorian houses were built, some with Eastlake detailing.

The Hillsboro Historic District was placed on the National Register of Historic Places on May 7, 1979.
