= Potomac Water Gap =

Double water gap in the Blue Ridge Mountains

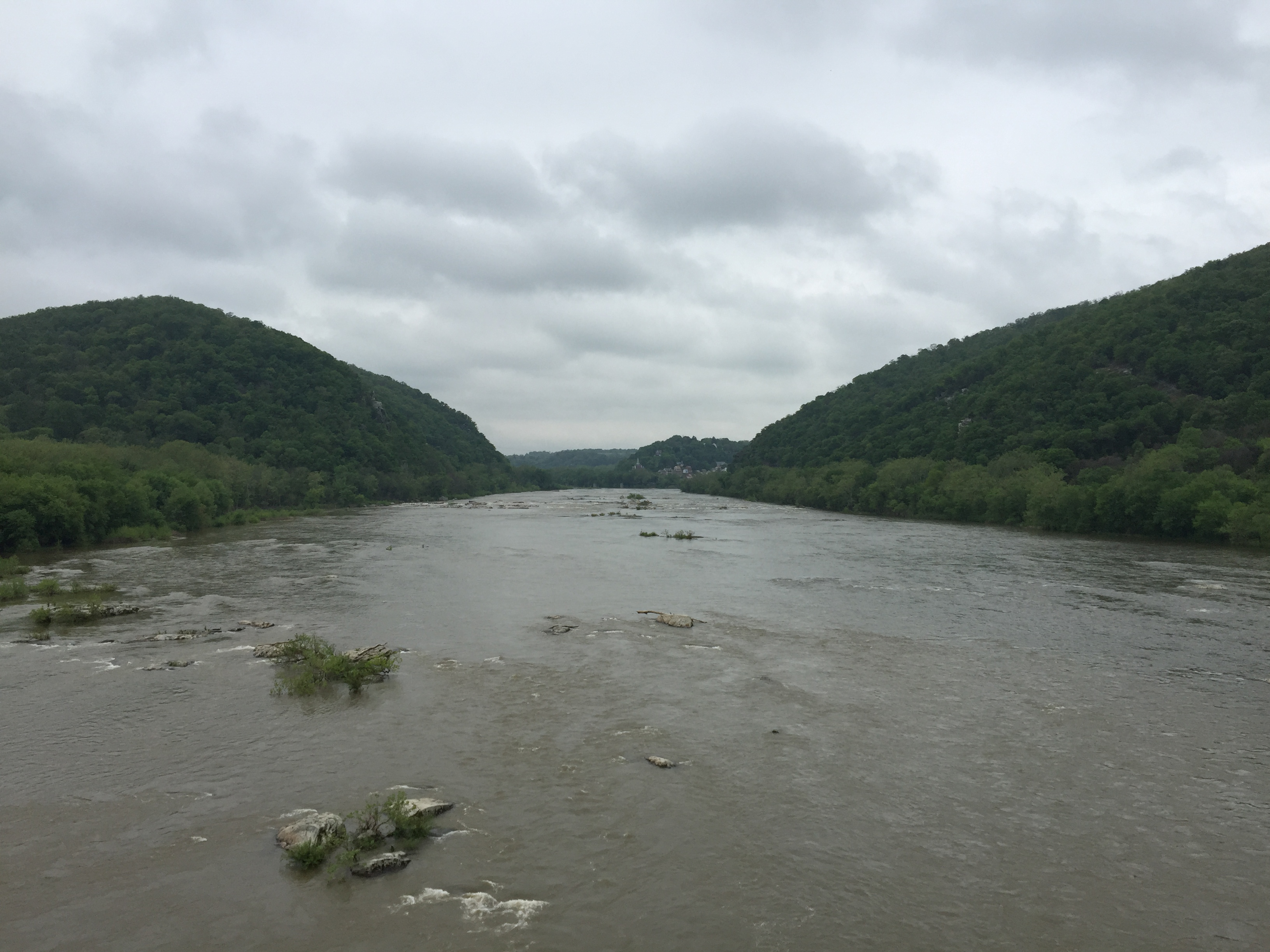
- View of the gap from the Sandy Hook Bridge (U.S. Route 340)

- Location within Maryland
- Elevation: 256 feet (78 m)
- Traversed by: U.S. Highway 340

Third Approach
- Location: Loudoun County, Virginia, Jefferson County, West Virginia, Frederick County and Washington County, Maryland, United States
- Range: Blue Ridge Mountains; Appalachian Mountains
- Coordinates: 39°19′N 77°43′W

The Potomac Water Gap is a double water gap in the Blue Ridge Mountains, located at the intersection of the states of Virginia, West Virginia and Maryland, near Harpers Ferry. At 256 feet (78 m), it is the lowest crossing of the Blue Ridge Mountains.

== Geography ==
As the Potomac River approaches the Blue Ridge on the eastern edge of the Shenandoah Valley, the river turns to the south paralleling the ridge to Bolivar, West Virginia, where it then cuts east, past Harpers Ferry to its confluence with the Shenandoah River at the western edge of the first gap between Blue Ridge Mountain to the south in Virginia and West Virginia and Elk Ridge Mountain to the north in Maryland. The River continues east for 4 miles (6.4 km), passing through the White Horse Rapids, before reaching the second gap between the Short Hill Mountain to the south in Virginia and South Mountain to the north in Maryland.

U.S. Route 340 and the Baltimore and Ohio Railroad both pass through the Potomac Water Gap. Historically, the Chesapeake and Ohio Canal passed through the gap as well.

== History ==
The history of the gap is inexorably tied to that of Harpers Ferry and the surrounding area. When Thomas Jefferson came to the town he remarked, while viewing the gap from Jefferson Rock on the ridge above the town, that "the view was worth a trip across the Atlantic." In 1859, Robert E. Lee, was hastily sent in and while reportedly wearing civilian clothes, led a detachment of Marines which passed through the gap en route to Harpers Ferry to put down John Brown's raid. During the American Civil War, the gap was used frequently by both Confederate and Union Armies to pass through the mountains and was the scene of fighting at the Battle of Harpers Ferry. Today, like the town, the gap, in addition to a thoroughfare, is a tourist destination. It is part of two national parks, Harpers Ferry National Historical Park and the Chesapeake and Ohio Canal National Historical Park, and the scenic Appalachian Trail passes through it as well.

== Gallery ==
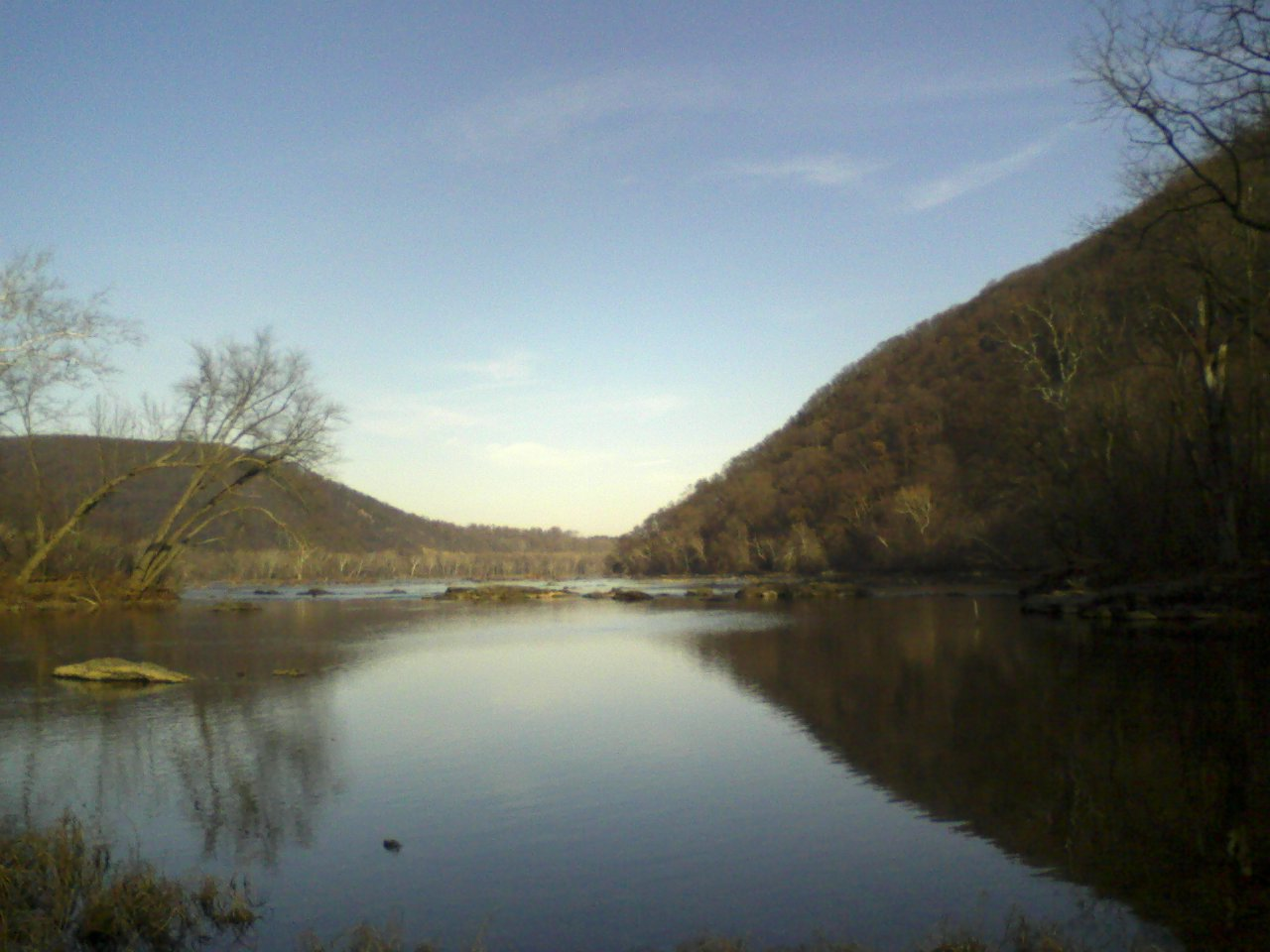
The eastern gap between South Mountain (left) and Short Hill Mountain (right)

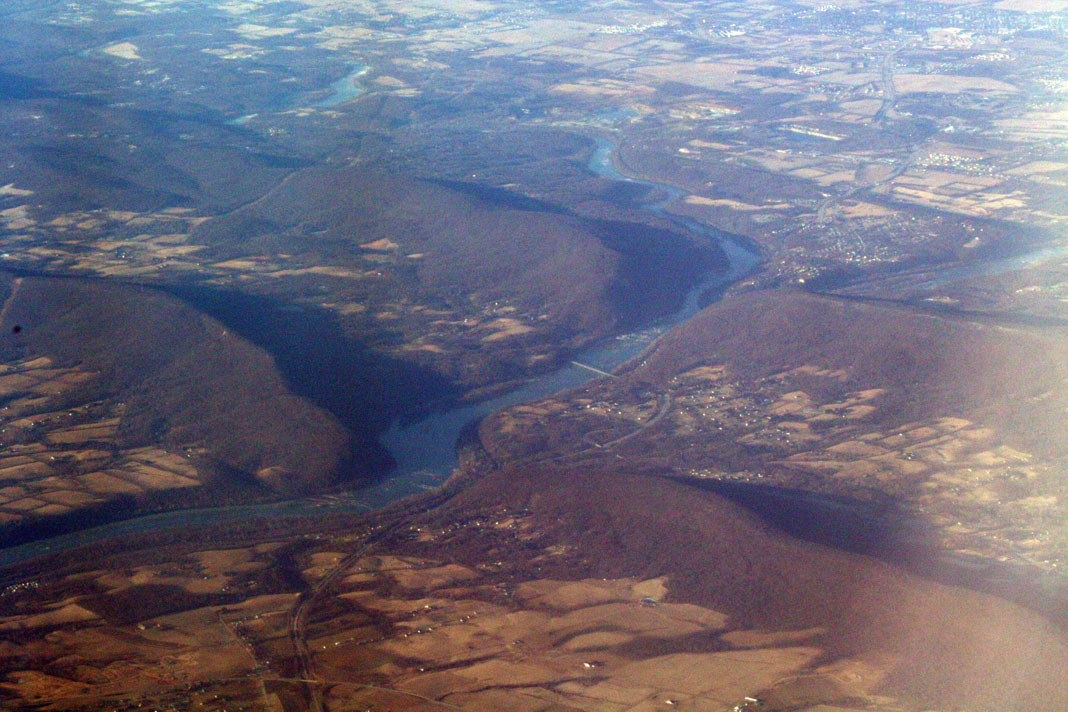
Oblique air photo of the water gaps, facing southwest
