= Burning of the Valleys =

Burning of the Valleys may refer to:

- The Burning of the Valleys (1780), part of the American Revolutionary War
- Several events during the Valley Campaigns of 1864, part of the American Civil War
  - The burning of Chambersburg, Pennsylvania
  - The burning of the Shenandoah Valley
    - The Burning Raid in the Loudoun Valley
