= Broken Hills (Virginia) =

Range of low-lying mountains and ridges in northern Virginia

The Broken Hills

Highest point
- Peak: Wildcat Mountain
- Elevation: 1,368 ft (417 m)
- Coordinates: 38°47′N 77°50′W

Dimensions
- Length: 12 mi (19 km)
- Width: 11.5 mi (18.5 km)

Geography
- Country: United States
- State: Virginia
- Region: Piedmont
- Parent range: Appalachian Mountains

The Broken Hills is a range of low-lying mountains and ridges in northern Fauquier County, Virginia.

The range begins just to the west of the southern Bull Run Mountains, north of Warrenton, Virginia and continues westward to the eastern edge of Blue Ridge Mountain. Interstate 66 and Virginia State Route 55 run just north of the range, while US-211 runs to the south. The stretch of US-17 between Warrenton and Marshall traverses the range.

The Broken Hills form the southern border of the Loudoun Valley.

== Notable mountains ==
- Wildcat [Wild Cat-1865,1914 Map] Mountain [1,368 feet (417 m)]
- Rappahanock [Rappahannock-1865,1914 Map] Mountain [1,300 feet (400 m)]
- Pignut [Pig Nut-1865 Map] Mountain [1,040 feet (320 m)]
- Prickly Pear Mountain [1,020 feet (310 m)]
- Viewtree [View Tree-1865,1914 Map] Mountain [1,020 feet (310 m)]
- Swains Mountain [900 feet (270 m)]
- Thumb Run Mountain [880 feet (270 m)]
- Waters [Watery-1865,1914 Map] Mountain [880 feet (270 m)]
- Piney Mountain [880 feet (270 m)]
