= Paris Mountain =

Mountain in Virginia, United States

- Location within Virginia

Highest point
- Elevation: 1,926 ft (587 m)
- Coordinates: 39°02′N 77°56′W

Geography
- Location: Loudoun & Clark counties, Virginia, U.S.
- Parent range: Blue Ridge Mountains; Appalachian Mountains

Paris Mountain is a peak of Blue Ridge Mountain on the border of Loudoun County and Clarke County in Virginia. The 1,926 feet (587 m) peak, which is located just north of Ashby's Gap and the town of Paris, for which it is named, represents the highest elevation in both counties. The peak is accessible by Blue Ridge Mountain Road from the gap. The Appalachian Trail crosses the western slope of the peak.
