= Purcell Knob =

Mountain in Virginia, United States

- Location within Virginia

Highest point
- Elevation: 1,207 ft (368 m)
- Prominence: 267 ft (81 m)
- Coordinates: 39°15′29″N 77°44′59″W

Geography
- Location: Loudoun County Virginia, U.S.
- Parent range: Blue Ridge Mountains; Appalachian Mountains

Purcell Knob is a spur of the Blue Ridge Mountain in Loudoun County, Virginia. The 1,207 feet (368 m) peak is just northeast of the main ridge at Keyes Gap and southeast of the village of Neersville.

Purcell Knob is notable for exposure of the sericitic phyllite base of the Paleozoic Loudoun Formation in its antiformal syncline.
