= Byron Farwell =

American historian and politician

Farwell c. 1957

Byron Edgar Farwell (June 20, 1921 – August 3, 1999) was an American military historian, biographer, and politician. He was the mayor of Hillsboro, Virginia, for three terms. He also worked for Chrysler, and was the author of 14 books and published articles in various national publications.

== Biography ==
Farwell was born in Manchester, Iowa, on June 20, 1921. He graduated from Ohio State University and the University of Chicago (M.A., 1968). He served in World War II as a captain and later also saw combat in the Korean War. He left the military after seven years of active duty.

His wife was named Ruth. The couple had three children As a civilian, he worked from 1954 to 1971 for Chrysler, including many years as director of administration in Geneva. During part of the 1960s he lived in Switzerland and London. He was mayor of Hillsboro, Virginia, for three terms from 1976 to 1982, losing re-election to a fourth term after a 17–17 vote where the winner was picked out of a punch bowl. As mayor of the town, Farwell became known for coming into conflict with the state and federal governments over items such as the census or regulation of the health department. He was paid $50 a year as mayor.

He published articles in publications such as The New York Times, The Washington Post, Harper's Magazine, American Heritage, and Smithsonian Magazine as well as working as a contributing editor to Military History, World War II, and Collier's Encyclopedia. He was a member of both the Royal Geographical Society and the Royal Society of Literature. Farwell was also a trustee of the Oatlands mansion. He died on August 3, 1999, of a heart attack, in a hospital in Loudoun County, Virginia.

Farwell gave his papers to the University of Iowa.

He completed 14 books, including The Man Who Presumed: A Biography of Henry M. Stanley (1957), Burton: A Biography of Sir Richard Francis Burton (1963), The Gurkhas (1984), The Great War in Africa, 1914–1918 (1986), Armies of the Raj: from the Mutiny to Independence, 1858-1947 (1989),The Great Anglo-Boer War (1990), and Over There: The United States in the Great War, 1917-1918 (1999).

== Books ==
- Let's Take a Trip in Our Car [children's book] (1954)
- Walter P. Chrysler (1957)
- The Man Who Presumed: A Biography of Henry M. Stanley (1957) ISBN 978-0393306293
- Burton: A Biography of Sir Richard Francis Burton (1963)
- Prisoners of the Mahdi (1967) ISBN 978-0393305791
- Queen Victoria's Little Wars (1972) ISBN 0-060-11222-0; UK edition (1973) ISBN 0-713-90457-7
- The Great Anglo-Boer War (1976) ISBN 0-889-02045-0 OCLC 1945130; UK edition The Great Boer War (1977) ISBN 0-713-90820-3
- Mr. Kipling's Army: All the Queen's Men (1981) ISBN 0-393-01386-3 OCLC 6330952; UK edition For Queen and Country: A Social History of the Victorian and Edwardian Army (1981) ISBN 0-713-91241-3
- The Gurkhas (1984) ISBN 0-393-01773-7 OCLC 9575881
- Eminent Victorian Soldiers: Seekers of Glory (1985) ISBN 0-393-01884-9
- The Great War in Africa, 1914–1918 (1986) ISBN 0-393-02369-9 OCLC 13498922
- Armies of the Raj: from the Mutiny to Independence, 1858-1947 (1989) ISBN 0-393-02679-5
- Ball's Bluff: A Small Battle and Its Long Shadow (1990), McLean, Virginia: EPM Publications; ISBN 0-939009-36-6.
- Stonewall: A Biography of General Thomas J. Jackson (1992) ISBN 0-393-31086-8 OCLC 29534965
- Over There: The United States in the Great War, 1917-1918 (1999)
