= Catoctin Creek (Virginia) =

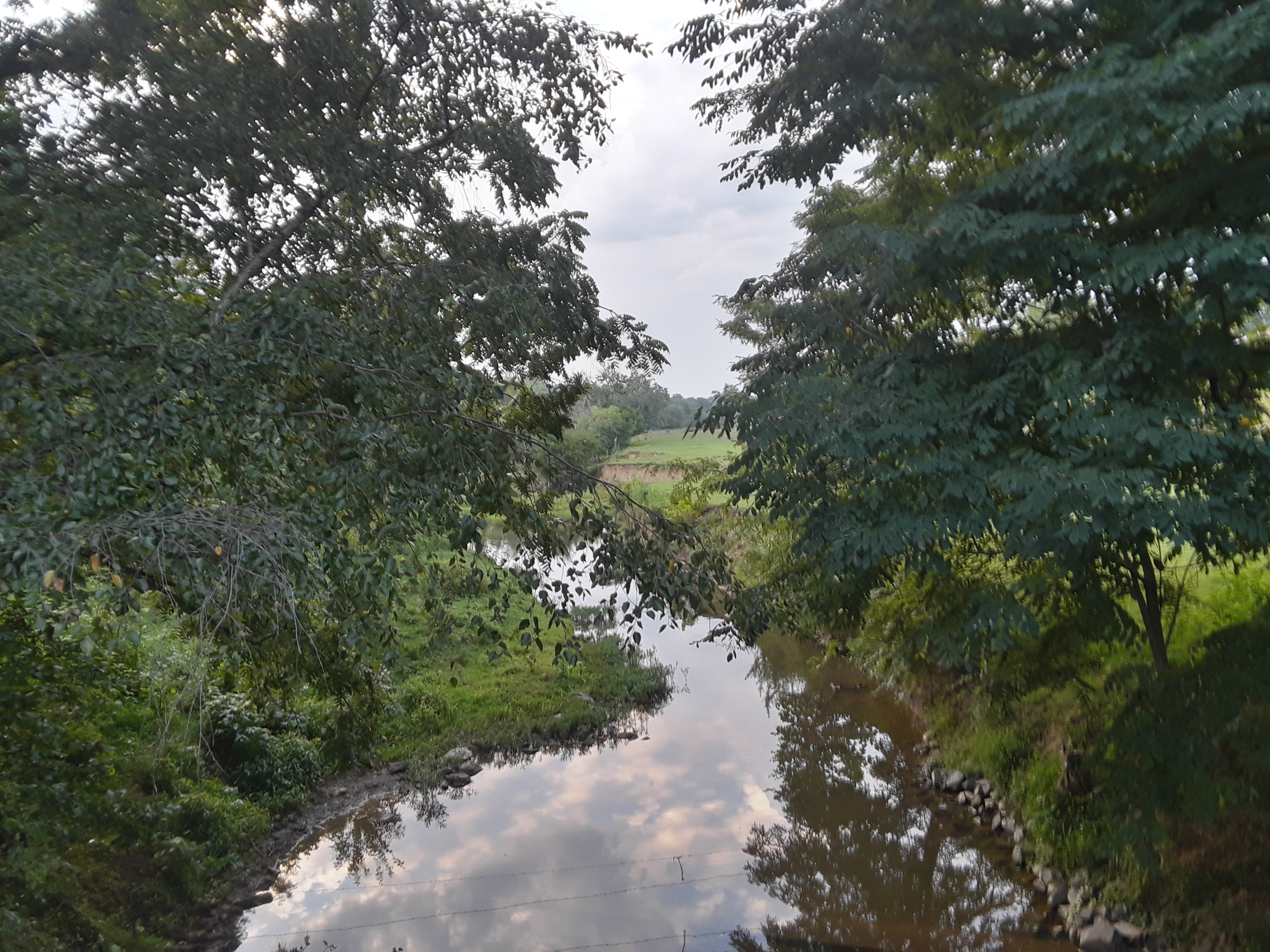

Location
- Country: United States
- State: Virginia
- Region: Loudoun County

Physical characteristics
- Source
  - location: Waterford
  - coordinates: 39.2098253°N 77.6211015°W
- Mouth: Potomac River
  - location: Point of Rocks, Maryland
  - coordinates: 39.2756576°N 77.5510994°W
  - elevation: 217 ft (66 m)
- Length: 14 mi (23 km)
- Basin size: 92.54 mi^{2} (239.7 km^{2})

Basin features
- River system: Potomac River
- Tributaries
  - left: South Fork Catoctin Creek
  - right: North Fork Catoctin Creek

Catoctin Creek is a 14.1-mile-long (22.7 km) tributary of the Potomac River in Loudoun County, Virginia, with a watershed of 59,000 acres (240 km^{2}). Agricultural lands make up 67 percent and forests 30 percent of Catoctin Creek's watershed. It is the main drainage system for the northern Loudoun Valley, including all of the Catoctin Valley.

== Course ==
The main arteries consist of the Catoctin and its North and South Forks.

=== North Fork Catoctin Creek ===
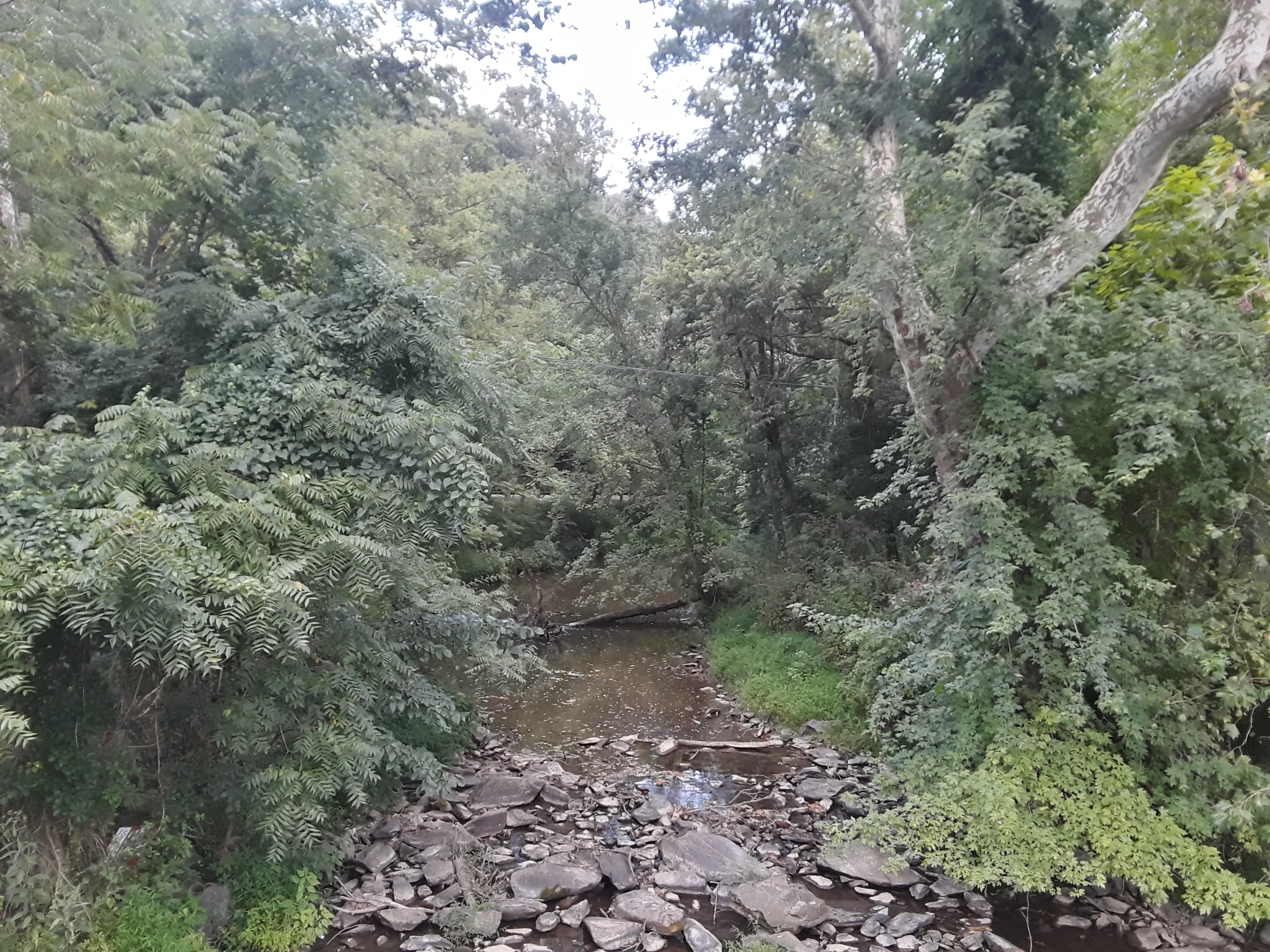
The North Fork where it passes under Virginia State Route 9 near Wheatland.

The North Fork Catoctin Creek, 14.5 miles (23.3 km) long, begins at Purcellville Reservoir east of the Blue Ridge Mountains in the Between the Hills valley, near the West Virginia border. State Route 9 follows the north fork westward as it flows through Hillsboro Gap in Short Hill Mountain at Hillsboro. From Wheatland the North Fork flows northeast.

=== South Fork Catoctin Creek ===
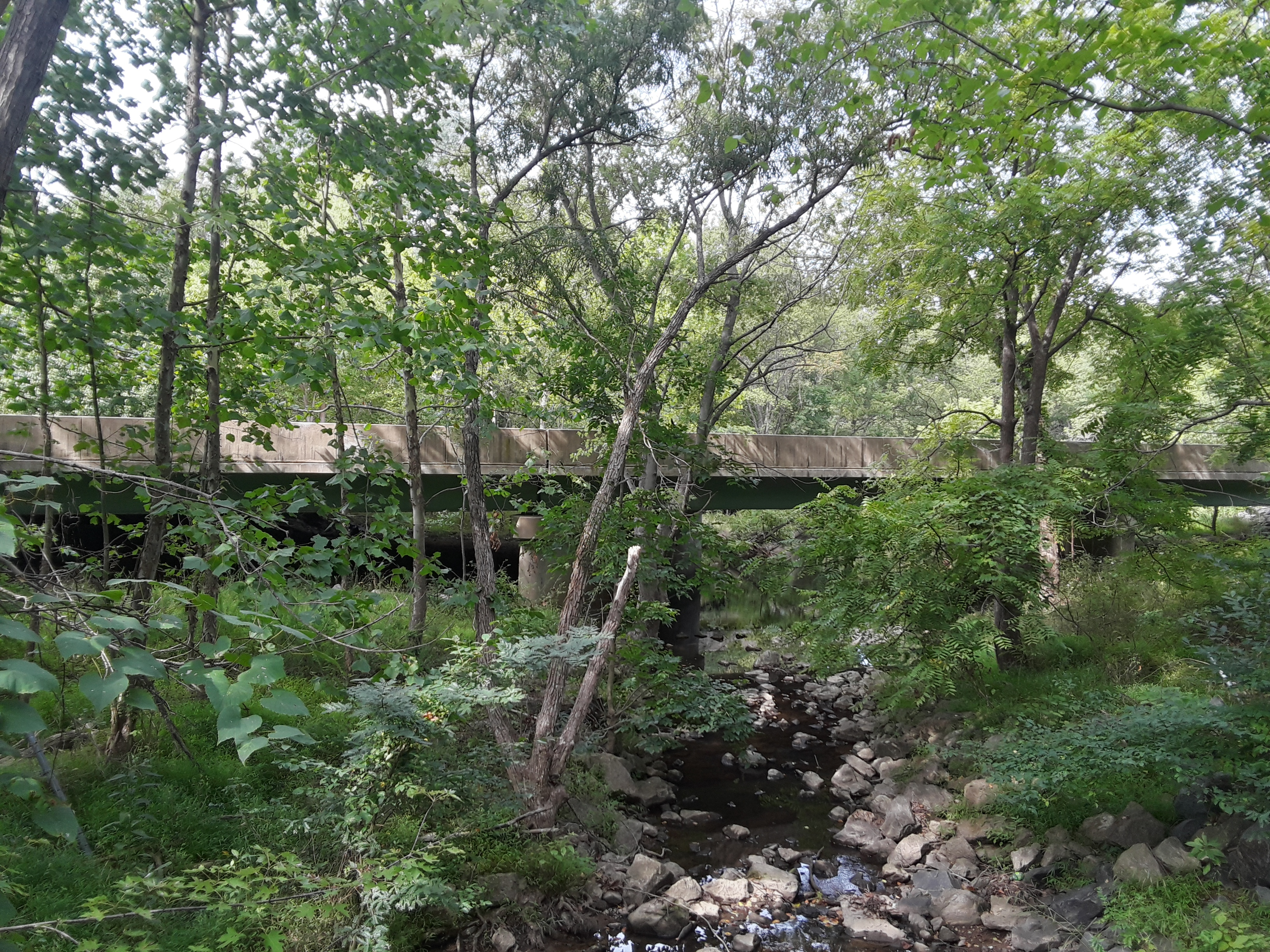
The South Fork where it passes under Virginia State Route 7 at Purcellville.

The source of the 18.5-mile-long (29.8 km) South Fork Catoctin Creek is just east of the Blue Ridge's Wilson Gap on the West Virginia border. From the source the South Fork flows southeast toward Purcellville, where it turns north and east toward Waterford, where it flows north again to its confluence with the North Fork.

=== Main Branch ===
The main branch of Catoctin Creek is formed by the confluence of its forks along the western edges of Catoctin Mountain north of Waterford and southeast of Milltown. The creek flows north along Catoctin Mountain's western side through the village of Taylorstown. Catoctin Creek continues meandering along the northern edge of Furnace Mountain and empties into the Potomac River to the north of the U.S. Highway 15 bridge across from Point of Rocks, Maryland.

== See also ==
- List of rivers of Virginia
