= Roundtop, West Virginia =

- Unincorporated community
- Location within West Virginia Location within the United States
- Coordinates: 39°40′25″N 78°13′50″W
- Country: United States
- State: West Virginia
- County: Morgan
- Elevation: 427 ft (130 m)
- Time zone: UTC-5 (Eastern (EST))
  - Summer (DST): UTC-4 (EDT)
- GNIS feature ID: 1557978

Roundtop was an unincorporated community in Morgan County, West Virginia, United States.
