= Virginia State Route 9 =

State highway in Loudoun County, Virginia, US

State Route 9
- Charles Town Pike

Route information
- Maintained by VDOT
- Length: 13.08 mi (21.05 km)
- Existed: 1940–present
- Tourist routes: Virginia Byway

Major junctions
- West end: WV 9 near Mechanicsville
- SR 287 in Wheatland
- East end: SR 7 / SR 7 Bus. near Paeonian Springs

Location
- Country: United States
- State: Virginia
- Counties: Loudoun

Highway system
- Virginia Routes; Interstate; US; Primary; Secondary; Byways; History; HOT lanes
← SR 8	→ SR 10

Virginia State Route 9 (SR 9) is a primary state highway in the U.S. state of Virginia. Known as Charles Town Pike, the state highway runs 13.08 miles (21.05 km) from the West Virginia state line near Mechanicsville, where the highway continues west as West Virginia Route 9 (WV 9), east to SR 7 and SR 7 Business in Paeonian Springs. SR 9 is the main east–west highway of northwestern Loudoun County, connecting Leesburg with Hillsboro and the West Virginia cities of Charles Town and Martinsburg. As a result, the state highway and its West Virginia continuation are a major commuter route between the Eastern Panhandle of West Virginia and Washington, D.C.

== Route description ==
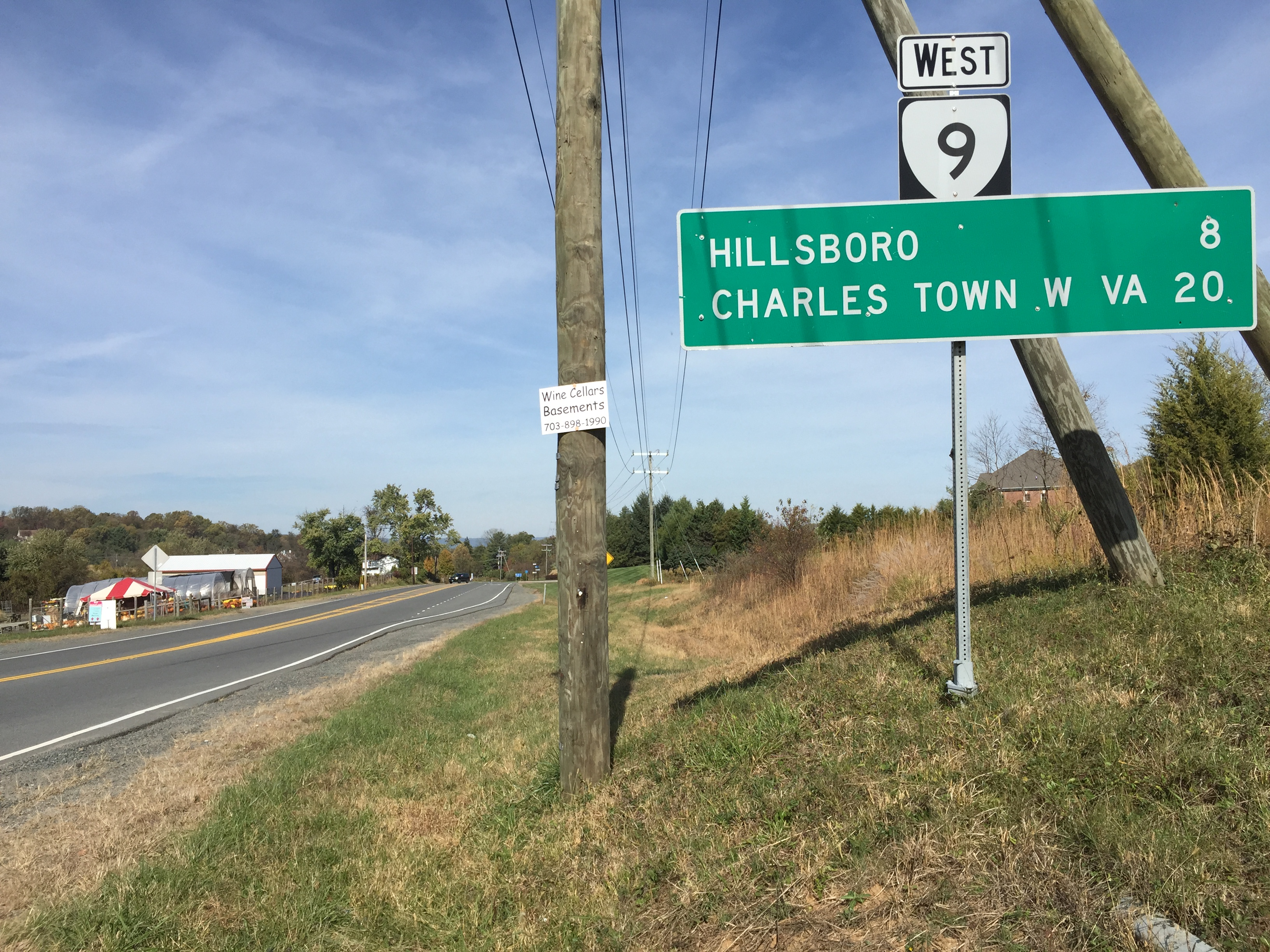
View west at the east end of SR 9 at SR 7 and SR 7 Bus. near Paeonian Springs

SR 9 begins at the West Virginia state line at Keyes Gap, a wind gap on top of Blue Ridge Mountain. The highway continues west as WV 9 to Charles Town. SR 9 heads southeast as a two-lane undivided road, passing to the west of Purcell Knob as the highway descends Blue Ridge Mountain to the village of Mechanicsville in a valley known as Between the Hills. At the eastern edge of the narrow north–south valley, the state highway parallels the North Fork of Catoctin Creek through Hillsboro Gap, a water gap in Short Hill Mountain, into the town of Hillsboro. SR 9 continues east through the much wider Catoctin Valley, crossing the North Fork and intersecting SR 287 in the hamlet of Wheatland. The state highway veers southeast and crosses the South Fork of Catoctin Creek before reaching the community of Paeonian Springs. SR 9 curves south to its eastern terminus at Clarke's Gap, a low point in Catoctin Mountain. The state highway expands to a four-lane divided highway and meets SR 7 (Harry Byrd Highway) at a dumbbell interchange. SR 9 is paralleled through the interchange by the Washington and Old Dominion Trail. At the southern end of the interchange, the highway continues southward as SR 7 Business (Colonial Highway), which immediately turns west toward Hamilton.

== History ==
The road was commissioned in 1928 as State Route 713. After the 1933 renumbering, the route became State Route 238. It became SR 9 at the 1940 renumbering which focused on coordinating route numbers with neighboring states. The number was transferred from what is now SR 120 and SR 123.

The Commonwealth Transportation Board voted to make the entire length of SR 9 a Virginia Byway on March 21, 2002.

There has been considerable debate about how to manage increasing traffic levels as the populations of both western Loudoun and Jefferson County, West Virginia have grown throughout the 21st century, turning what was a country road into a major commuter route. In 2012, West Virginia completed a replacement of its two-lane Route 9 with a four-lane expressway to Charles Town. Virginia did not follow suit, leading to concerns about whether its narrow and winding Route 9 would be able to handle the traffic load. In particular, the stretch through Hillsboro, where Route 9 is that town's main street, became unsafe for pedestrians and would see large backups during rush hours. A bypass of Hillsboro was last proposed in 2008 and eventually removed from the county's draft 2010 transportation plan after protracted debate. A significant physical obstacle is that the town completely fills Hillsboro Gap; Route 9 cannot be widened in-place, and any bypass would have to go over or tunnel through Short Hill Mountain, substantially increasing its cost. Instead, VDOT and the Town of Hillsboro completed a range of reconstruction and traffic calming measures in 2022, with the intention of detouring high-speed traffic between Charles Town and Leesburg to U.S. Route 340 to the west.

== Major intersections ==
The entire route is in Loudoun County.

Location	mi	km	Destinations	Notes
Keyes Gap	0.00	0.00	WV 9 west – Charles Town	West Virginia state line; western terminus
Mechanicsville			SR 671 (Harpers Ferry Road) to US 340 – Harpers Ferry	former SR 275 north
Wheatland	7.77	12.50	SR 287 (Berlin Turnpike) – Lovettsville, Purcellville	
Clarks Gap	13.08	21.05	SR 7 / SR 7 Bus. west (East Colonial Highway) – Leesburg, Hamilton, Purcellville	Interchange with SR 7; eastern terminus; eastern terminus of SR 7 Bus.
1.000 mi = 1.609 km; 1.000 km = 0.621 mi
