= Clarke's Gap =

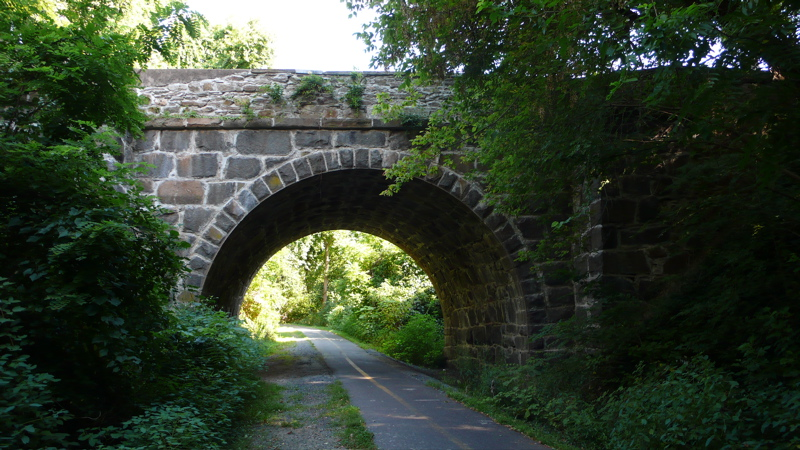
- Stone bridge over Washington and Old Dominion Trail in Clarke's Gap in August 2008

- Location within Virginia
- Elevation: 643
- Traversed by: Virginia Route 7 Virginia Route 9 Virginia Route 699

Third Approach
- Location: Loudoun County, Virginia, U.S.
- Coordinates: 39°08′24″N 77°36′34″W

Clarke's Gap, also known as Clarks Gap, is a pass through Catoctin Mountain west of Leesburg, Virginia. The gap has an elevation of 643 feet (196 m). The gap is not a true wind gap, but rather a man-made railroad cut through a local saddle point between two ridges to the southeast and northwest created by the drainage of Dry Mill Branch of Tuscarora Creek to the east and an unnamed tributary of Catoctin Creek to the west.

The original road between Alexandria and Winchester, known as Vestal's Gap or Braddock's Road passed through the gap beginning in the middle 18th century. Later, in the 1860s the Alexandria, Loudoun and Hampshire Railroad, predecessor of the Washington and Old Dominion Railroad was routed through the gap. The railroad christened the gap when it established a station there, naming it after a nearby landowner, Addison H. Clarke. Today, Dry Mill Road (Virginia State Route 699 (VA Route 699)) and the Washington and Old Dominion Trail still pass through the gap. VA Route 7 and VA Route 9 pass just to the north of the gap, through a man-made highway cut, which the Virginia Department of Transportation has mistakenly signed as "Clarks Gap".
