= Wilson Gap =

- Gregory's Gap
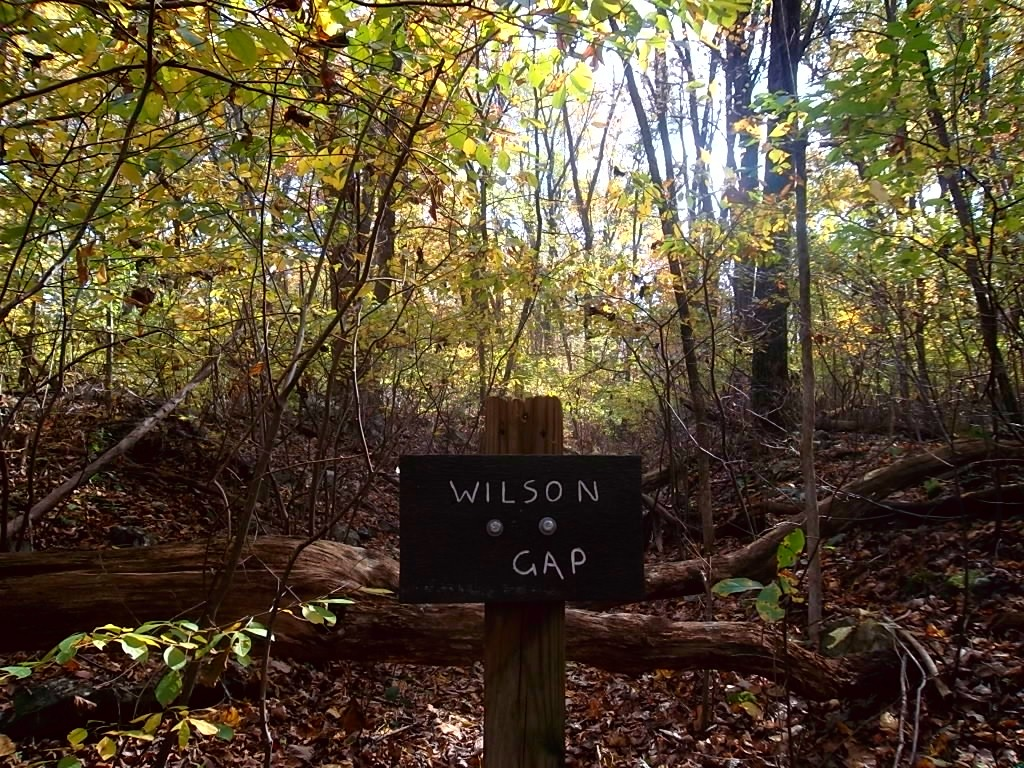
- Sign for Wilson Gap on the Appalachian Trail

- Location within Virginia
- Elevation: 1,444 feet (440 m)

Third Approach
- Location: Loudoun County, Virginia / Jefferson County, West Virginia, United States
- Range: Blue Ridge Mountains; Appalachian Mountains
- Coordinates: 39°10′20″N 77°48′22″W

Wilson Gap, originally known as Gregory's Gap, is a wind gap in the Blue Ridge Mountain, located on the border of Loudoun County, Virginia and Jefferson County, West Virginia. The Appalachian Trail crosses the gap.

The 1,444 feet (440 m) gap once served as a thoroughfare between Round Hill, the former terminus of the Washington and Old Dominion Railroad in western Loudoun, and the resort communities of Shannondale and Mountain Mission in Jefferson County via the Wilson Gap Road. The resorts fell victim to the Great Depression and the upper reaches of Wilson Gap Road became impassable to vehicular traffic by the outbreak of World War II. Though no longer maintained as a public road, the old road bed can still be found by the discerning hiker.
