= Hillsboro Gap =

Water gap

- The Gap in the Short Hill
- Location within Virginia
- Elevation: 510 ft (160 m)
- Traversed by: Virginia Route 9

Third Approach
- Location: Loudoun County, Virginia, United States
- Range: Short Hill Mountain; Blue Ridge Mountains
- Coordinates: 39°12′N 77°42′W

Hillsboro Gap, also known as the Gap in the Short Hill, is a water gap in the Short Hill Mountain formed by the North Fork of the Catoctin Creek in Loudoun County, Virginia. The gap derives its name from the town of Hillsboro, which is nestled in the gap. Virginia State Route 9 passes through the gap in the town.

In colonial times the main road between Alexandria and Winchester, Vestal's Gap Road, passed through the gap. That road eventually became the Charles Town Pike and modern day Route 9.

The gap poses a barrier to any widening of Route 9 as the historic town completely fills the gap.
