= Bull Run Mountains =

Mountain range in Virginia, United States

Highest point
- Peak: Signal Mountain
- Elevation: 1,329 ft (405 m)

Dimensions
- Length: 15 mi (24 km) NE-SW
- Width: 3 mi (4.8 km) E-W

Geography
- Country: United States
- State: Virginia
- Range coordinates: 38°53.6′N 77°40.8′W
- Parent range: Blue Ridge Mountains

Geology
- Orogeny: Alleghenian
- Rock type: Catoctin Greenstone

The Bull Run Mountains are a mountain range of the Blue Ridge Mountains in northern Virginia in the United States. They are located approximately 20 miles (32 km) east of the main chain, across the Loudoun Valley. The Bull Run Mountains, together with Catoctin Mountain in Virginia and Maryland, make up the easternmost front of the Blue Ridge.

The mountain range is the home of the Virginia Outdoors Foundation's Preserve at Bull Run Mountains, which is a state-designated Natural Area Preserve dedicated to the scientific and educational potential of the region. The Preserve at Bull Run Mountains has over seven miles of trails that are open to the public on Fridays, Saturdays, and Sundays year round.

The mountain range also holds several communities of residents, which includes the Bull Run Mountain Estates.

Interstate 66, the John Marshall Highway (Virginia Route 55) and the Manassas Gap Railroad pass through the range at Thoroughfare Gap.

== Geography ==
The range extends in a southwest–northeast orientation for approximately 15 miles (24 km) from Aldie in Loudoun County, through western Prince William County to New Baltimore in Fauquier County. In the north, from Aldie to the headwaters of Bull Run Creek, the range serves as the eastern border of the southern Loudoun Valley. South of Bull Run Creek, the watershed of the range forms the western border of Prince William with Fauquier and thus the eastern slopes are in the former county, while the western slopes are in the latter.

The range consists of three closely spaced ridges (with several spurs), which converge in the center of the range. The northern section of the range consists of a solitary ridge, which dies out towards the center of the range, whereupon two ridges to the west gain prominence. In the southern section the central ridge dies out as well and the westernmost ridge solely comprises the range. The section of the Bull Run Mountains south of Thoroughfare Gap is sometimes referred to as the Pond Mountains. The Broken Hills intersect the range south of I-66 in the southern section.

== Geology ==
The Bull Run Mountains are a geological extension of the same formation that makes up the Catoctin Mountain. This formation consist mainly of Catoctin greenstone interspersed with white quartz and Precambrian metamorphosed basalt flows. The lower ridges on the eastern front also contain Jurassic basalt flows. These rocks were transported westward to their current location and uplifted during the Alleghenian Orogeny.

== History ==
The Battle of Thoroughfare Gap was fought on the mountain prior to the Second Battle of Manassas during the American Civil War.

== Peaks and gaps ==
- Peaks (from north to south)
  - Aldie Mountain [700 feet (210 m)]
  - Long Hill Mountain [740 feet (230 m)]
  - Bull Run Ridge [1,240 feet (380 m)]
  - High Acre Ridge [1,320 feet (400 m)]
  - Griffen Mountain [950 feet (290 m)]
  - Fishback Ridge [880 feet (270 m)]
  - Signal Mountain [1,369 feet (417 m)]
  - High Point Mountain [1,311 feet (400 m)]
  - Bisquit Mountain [850 feet (260 m)]
  - Pond Mountain [840 feet (260 m)]
- Gaps (from north to south)
  - Buchannon Gap [587 feet (179 m)]
  - Cold Spring Gap [702 feet (214 m)]
  - Hopewell Gap [860 feet (260 m)]
  - Thoroughfare Gap [423 feet (129 m)]
