= Morrisonville, Virginia =

Unincorporated community in Virginia, United States

- Unincorporated community
- Location within Northern Virginia Location within Virginia Location within the United States
- Coordinates: 39°13′23″N 77°40′6″W
- Country: United States
- State: Virginia
- County: Loudoun
- Time zone: UTC−5 (Eastern (EST))
  - Summer (DST): UTC−4 (EDT)

Morrisonville is an unincorporated community in northern Loudoun County, Virginia, United States. It is located on Morrisonville Road (Virginia Secondary Route 693).

== History ==
The village was founded in the early 19th century. It was named after Archibald Morrison, a major landholder in the early 1800s. By the 1850s, it had a store and a post office, neither of which the town has in present day. The village gained attention as being the birthplace of the Pulitzer Prize winning author Russell Baker, as he discusses his childhood experience in Morrisonville in his award winning autobiography Growing Up.
