= Blue Ridge Mountain =

Mountain in West Virginia, United States

Coordinates: 39°4′54″N 77°51′44″W

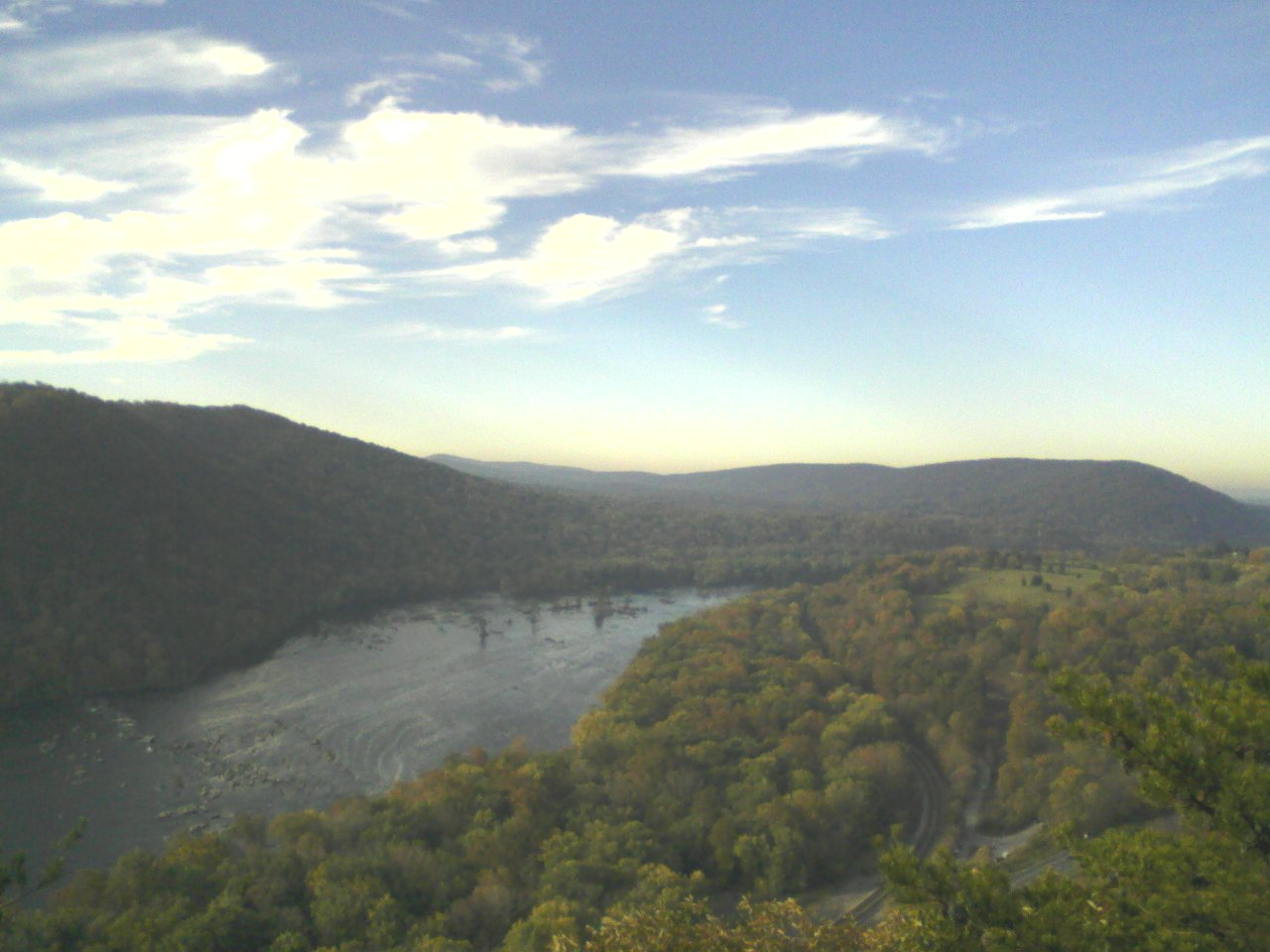
- Blue Ridge Mountain as seen from across the Potomac on Weverton Cliffs

Highest point
- Elevation: 2,388 ft (728 m)

Geography
- Location: Virginia, West Virginia
- Parent range: Blue Ridge Mountains

Climbing
- Easiest route: Hike

Blue Ridge Mountain, also known as Blue Mountain, is the colloquial name of the westernmost ridge of the Blue Ridge Mountains in Northern Virginia and the eastern panhandle of West Virginia. The Appalachian Trail traverses the entire length of the mountain along its western slope and crest.

== Geography ==
The mountain extends from the Potomac River in the north to Linden Gap in the south. Along this section of the Blue Ridge Mountains, Blue Ridge Mountain comprises the sole ridge of the chain in the immediate vicinity and contains few spur ridges or peaks. The notable exceptions are the Bull Run and Catoctin mountains, which lie approximately 20 miles (32 km) to the east across the Loudoun Valley, and Short Hill Mountain, located 4 miles (6 km) to the east, which runs parallel to the Blue Ridge for 12 miles (19 km) near its northern terminus. To the west of the mountain is the lower Shenandoah Valley.

Blue Ridge Mountain is noticeably lower in elevation than other sections of the Blue Ridge Mountains in Virginia. The southern section of the mountain contains the highest peaks, and the ridge gradually loses elevation as it gets closer to the Potomac. Elevations in the gaps are typically around 1,000 feet (300 m), while peaks range from 1,200 to 2,300 feet (370 to 700 m). Across the Potomac the ridge continues as Elk Ridge in Maryland.

The mountain's ridgecrest forms the border between several counties, with Loudoun County and Fauquier County, both in Virginia, to the east, and Jefferson County, West Virginia, Clarke County, Virginia, and Warren County, Virginia to the west.

== Geology ==
Blue Ridge Mountain consists mostly of anticlinal Catoctin Greenstone and is not underlain by Old Rag Granite, as is the Blue Ridge south of Manassas Gap. This is why the mountain is more ridgelike and less rugged than sections to the south. The greenstone was deposited during the Catoctin Formation and uplifted during the Alleghenian Orogeny.

== Recreation ==
Blue Ridge Mountain contains several national, state, regional and private parks that offer recreational opportunities on the mountain including:

- Harpers Ferry National Historical Park
- Blue Ridge Center for Environmental Stewardship
- Rolling Ridge Foundation
- Sky Meadows State Park
- G. Richard Thompson Wildlife Management Area

== Notable peaks ==
North to south:

- Loudoun Heights
- Purcell Knob
- Raven Rocks
- Mount Weather
- Paris Mountain

== Notable gaps ==
North to south:

- Keyes Gap
- Wilson Gap
- Snickers Gap
- Ashby Gap
- Manassas Gap
