= Short Hill Mountain =

Mountain in Virginia, United States

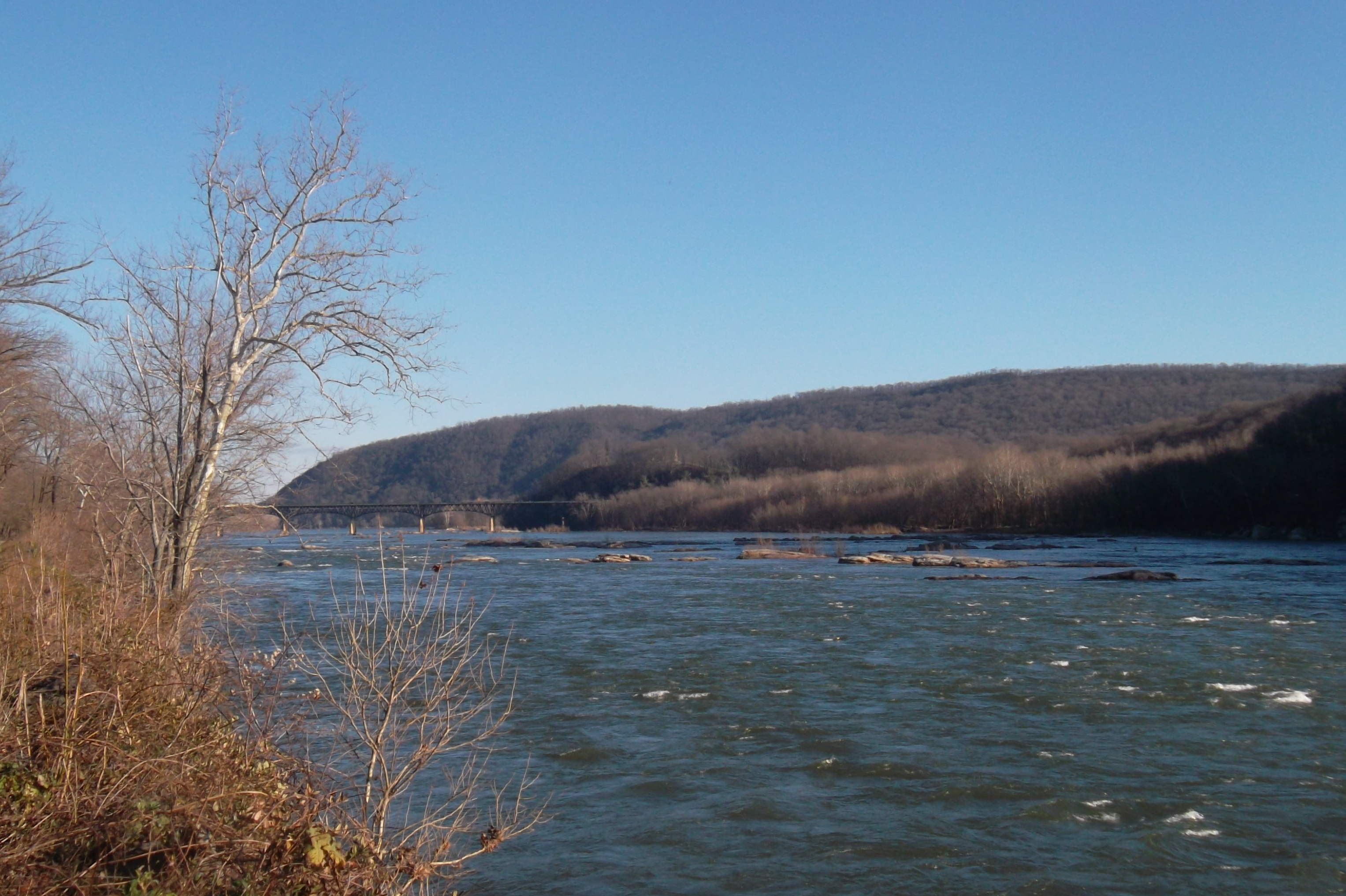
- Short Hill Mountain as seen from across the Potomac River along the C&O Canal

Highest point
- Elevation: 1,442 ft (440 m)
- Prominence: 642 ft (196 m)
- Coordinates: 39°15′N 77°43′W

Geography
- Location within Virginia
- Location: Loudoun County, Virginia, U.S.
- Parent range: Blue Ridge Mountains; Appalachian Mountains
- Topo map: USGS Purcellville

Short Hill Mountain is a mountain ridge of the Blue Ridge Mountains in northwest Loudoun County, Virginia.

== Geography ==
Short Hill rises sharply from the Piedmont countryside of the Loudoun Valley, northwest of Purcellville. It is a low-lying ridge, barely over 400 feet (120 m) in elevation. The mountain ridge extends northeast for approximately 3 miles (4.8 km) before descending to the Hillsboro Gap, through which the North Fork of Catoctin Creek flows and the town of Hillsboro is located. North of the gap, the ridge quickly achieves heights of greater than 600 feet (180 m), and continues for 12 miles (19 km), gradually gaining elevation, before dropping precipitously to the Potomac River.

The portion of the mountain south of Hillsboro Gap is known as Signal Mountain for the Union Army signaling station located on its 1,020 feet (310 m) summit during the American Civil War. North of the Potomac, the ridge continues as South Mountain in Maryland and Pennsylvania.

Short Hill is about 4 miles (6.4 km) east of the crest of the Blue Ridge Mountain, which forms the western border of Loudoun County, and the valley in between the mountains is known as Between the Hills and includes the villages of Loudoun Heights and Neersville. To the east of the mountain is the Catoctin Valley.

A small portion of Short Hill, along its northwestern slope and adjoining the Potomac, is owned by the National Park Service to preserve downriver views for Harpers Ferry National Historical Park. The rest of the mountain is in private hands and is by and large undeveloped. The only road crossing of the mountain is Virginia State Route 9 at Hillsboro.

Short Hill as seen from Elk Ridge in Maryland

== Geology ==
The rocks underlying Short Hill are of the late Proterozoic and early Paleozoic eras. The formation consists primarily of metabasalt greenstone deposited during the early Catoctin Formation and interspersed with metasedimentary phyllite, schist and breccia, which were deposited later. The rocks were originally deposited contiguous with those of the Blue Ridge Mountains and uplifted together during the Grenville Orogeny. The two ridges were later separated in the late Paleozoic era by movement along the Short Hill Fault, which runs along the western edge of the mountain. During the Alleghenian Orogeny the rocks were pushed westward to their present location and uplifted once more.

== Project Office ==
Short Hill Mountain north of Hillsboro is home to one of several AT&T Corporation Project Offices, underground facilities constructed in the 1960s to provide redundant communications services. The Short Hill facility was renovated in the late 2010s and remains active.
