= Wheatland, Virginia =

Unincorporated community in Virginia, United States

- Unincorporated community
- Location within Northern Virginia Location within Virginia Location within the United States
- Coordinates: 39°11′27″N 77°40′32″W
- Country: United States
- State: Virginia
- County: Loudoun
- Time zone: UTC−5 (Eastern (EST))
  - Summer (DST): UTC−4 (EDT)

Wheatland is an unincorporated community in Loudoun County, Virginia, United States located north of Purcellville and south of Lovettsville on Berlin Turnpike (VA 287). Originally located at the intersection of Berlin Turnpike and the Charles Town Pike (State Route 9), the present day road bed of Charles Town Pike lies south of its historical right of way so the village is just north of that intersection.
