= Lovettsville, Virginia =

- Town
- Town of Lovettsville
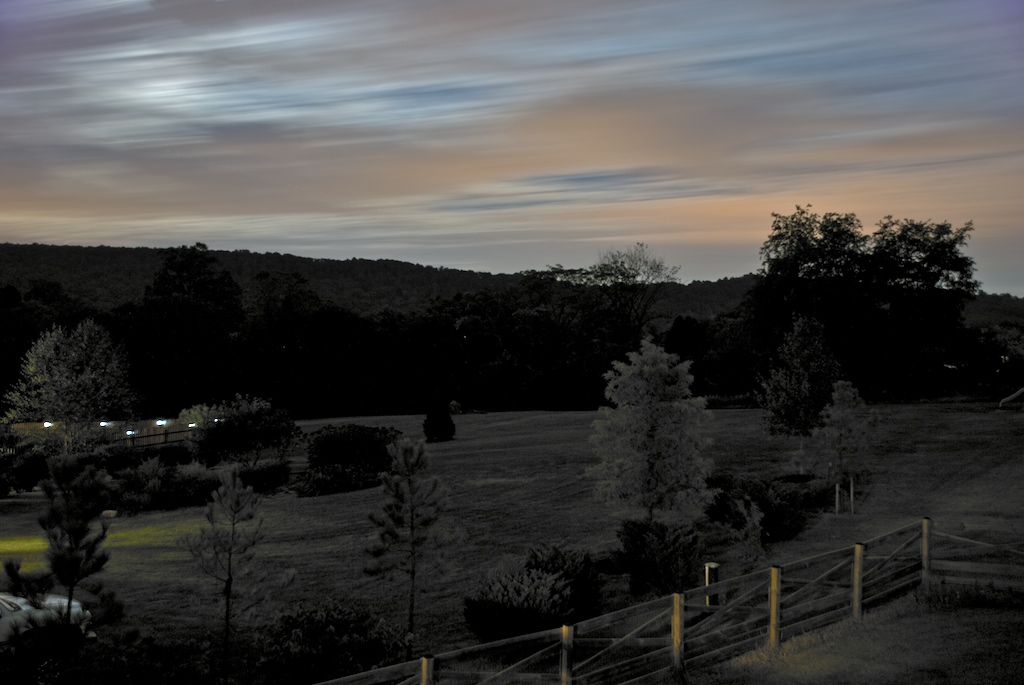
- Lovettsville in September 2008

- Seal

- Location within Northern Virginia Location within Virginia Location within the United States
- Coordinates: 39°16.4′N 77°38.4′W
- Country: United States
- State: Virginia
- County: Loudoun

Government
  - Mayor: Christopher M. Hornbaker
  - Vice Mayor: Joy Pritz

Area
  - Total: 0.85 sq mi (2.20 km^{2})
  - Land: 0.85 sq mi (2.19 km^{2})
  - Water: 0.0039 sq mi (0.01 km^{2})
- Elevation: 505 ft (154 m)

Population (2020)
  - Total: 2,694
  - Estimate (2019): 2,198
  - Density: 2,603.2/sq mi (1,005.09/km^{2})
- Time zone: UTC-5 (Eastern (EST))
  - Summer (DST): UTC-4 (EDT)
- ZIP code: 20180
- Area code: 540
- FIPS code: 51-47208
- GNIS feature ID: 1495879
- Website: www.lovettsvilleva.gov

Lovettsville is a town in Loudoun County, located near the very northern tip of the Commonwealth of Virginia, United States. Settled primarily by German immigrants, the town was originally established in 1836.

As of the 2020 census, Lovettsville had a population of 2,694.

== History ==
Following the 1722 Treaty of St. Albans which established the Blue Ridge Mountains as the buffer between Native Americans and white settlers, German immigrants began arriving in the northern Loudoun Valley to farm the rich topsoil. They established several villages, many constructed of log and wooden buildings, and began to expand their land holdings. Lovettsville was then called "The German Settlement".

In 1820 David Lovett subdivided his property into quarter-acre "city lots". As a result of the ensuing construction boom, the town was called "Newtown". In 1828, the town was again renamed, to "Lovettsville". In 1836 the Virginia General Assembly established Lovettsville as a town, but the town was not fully incorporated until 1876.

During the Civil War, Lovettsville was an important transportation stop for Union troops crossing the Potomac River. Lovettsville was among the few communities in Loudoun County to vote against secession.

In 1940, Lovettsville was the site of a crash of a DC-3 airliner. It was the worst in US history at that time, killing 25 people, including U.S. Senator Ernest Lundeen, and became known as the Lovettsville air disaster.

The Lovettsville Historic District was listed on the National Register of Historic Places in 2012.

In 2018, after the NHL's Washington Capitals advanced to the Stanley Cup Final for the second time in franchise history, the town's council voted to temporarily rename Lovettsville "Capitals-ville" for the duration of the finals.

== Geography ==
Lovettsville is located in northern Loudoun County at 39°16.4′N 77°38.4′W (39.2728, -77.6399). Virginia State Route 287 passes through the center of town, leading north 3 miles (5 km) to Brunswick, Maryland, and south 11 miles (18 km) to Purcellville. Leesburg, the Loudoun county seat, is 14 miles (23 km) southeast of Lovettsville.

According to the United States Census Bureau, the town has a total area of 0.85 square miles (2.2 km^{2}), of which 2.1 acres (8,354 m^{2}), or 0.38%, are water. The town sits on a low ridge within the Loudoun Valley, with the west side of town draining to Dutchman Creek and the east side draining to Quarter Branch, both streams flowing north to the Potomac River.

== Government ==
Lovettsville has a council–manager form of government:

Town Council:

- Christopher M. Hornbaker, Mayor
- Joy Pritz, Vice Mayor
- Brandon Davis
- David Earl
- Thomas Budnar
- Stuart Stahl

Administration:

- Jason Cournoyer, Town Manager

== Demographics ==
Historical population
Census	Pop.	Note	%±
1870	155		—
1880	92		−40.6%
1900	97		—
1910	192		97.9%
1920	167		−13.0%
1930	239		43.1%
1940	248		3.8%
1950	341		37.5%
1960	217		−36.4%
1970	185		−14.7%
1980	613		231.4%
1990	749		22.2%
2000	853		13.9%
2010	1,613		89.1%
2020	2,694		67.0%
U.S. Decennial Census

As of the census of 2010, there were 1,613 people, 566 households, and 424 families residing in the town. The population density was 1,832.9 people per square mile (707.7 people/km^{2}). There were 599 housing units at an average density of 680.7 units per square mile (262.8 units/km^{2}). The racial makeup of the town was 87.0% White, 6.0% African American, 0.3% Native American, 1.7% Asian, 0.1% Pacific Islands American, 1.9% from other races, and 3% from two or more races. Hispanic or Latino of any race were 7.3% of the population.

There were 566 households, out of which 46.6% had children under the age of 18 living with them, 59.4% were married couples living together, 4.4% had a male householder with no wife present, 11.1% had a female householder with no husband present, and 25.1% were non-families. 18.6% of all households were made up of individuals, and 6.5% had someone living alone who was 65 years of age or older. The average household size was 2.85 and the average family size was 3.3.

In the town, the population was spread out, with 32.4% under the age of 18, 4.3% from 18 to 24, 33.4% from 25 to 44, 22.1% from 45 to 64, and 7.6% who were 65 years of age or older. The median age was 33.5 years. For every 100 females there were 92.4 males.

The median income for a household in the town was $100,288, and the median income for a family was $109,808. Males had a median income of $72,661 versus $51,438 for females. The per capita income for the town was $33,212. None of the families and .6% of the population were living below the poverty line, including no under eighteens and 9.1% of those over 64.

== Transportation ==
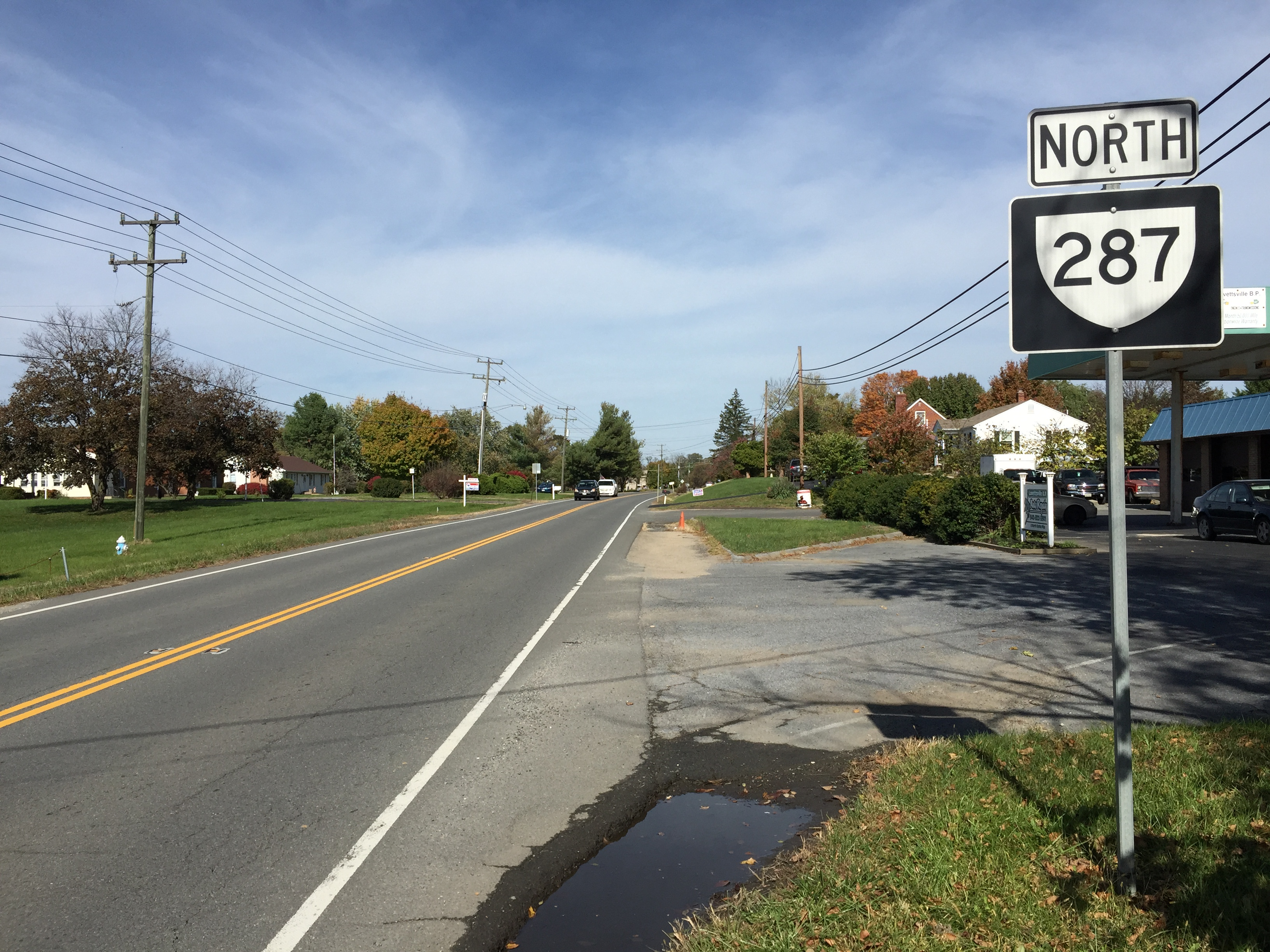
SR 287, the primary highway serving Lovettsville

The only primary highway directly serving Lovettsville is Virginia State Route 287. SR 287 extends southward to Virginia State Route 7 at Purcellville. It also continues north to the Potomac River, where a bridge connects the north end of SR 287 to Brunswick, Maryland.

== Events ==
- Lovettsville Oktoberfest typically takes place on the last full weekend of September.
- Over Memorial Day Weekend, Lovettsville hosts Mayfest, billed as Lovettsville's All-American town picnic.
- Over the first weekend of December, the Loudoun Valley German Society hosts the acclaimed annual Christkindlmarkt (traditional German Christmas market).
- On New Year's Day, Lovettsville hosts Bezerkle on the Squirkle, a 5K fun run around oddly-arranged traffic square at the center of town.
- The town also hosts Movies and Concerts on the Green at the Walker Pavilion monthly during the warm weather months.

== Notable people ==
- Warren T. Brookes, newspaper columnist
- Hal Douglas, voiceover recording artist
- Rob Jones, United States Marine
- Chip Roy, U.S. Representative from Texas's 21st congressional district, raised in Lovettsville.
