= Hillsboro, Loudoun County, Virginia =

Hillsboro, Virginia
- Town
- Town of Hillsboro
- Charles Town Pike (Virginia State Route 9) in Hillsboro

- Location within Northern Virginia Location within Virginia Location within the United States
- Coordinates: 39°11′54″N 77°43′28″W
- Country: United States
- State: Virginia
- County: Loudoun

Area
  - Total: 0.27 sq mi (0.69 km^{2})
  - Land: 0.27 sq mi (0.69 km^{2})
  - Water: 0.0039 sq mi (0.01 km^{2})
- Elevation: 551 ft (168 m)

Population (2020)
  - Total: 114
  - Density: 430/sq mi (166.1/km^{2})
- Time zone: UTC−5 (Eastern (EST))
  - Summer (DST): UTC−4 (EDT)
- ZIP codes: 20132, 20134
- Area code: 540
- FIPS code: 51-37288
- GNIS feature ID: 1499563
- Website: www.hillsborova.gov

Hillsboro is a rural town in Loudoun County, Virginia, United States. The population was 114 at the 2020 census.

== Geography ==
Hillsboro is located in western Loudoun County at 39°11′54″N 77°43′28″W (39.198347, −77.724391), at the eastern end of Hillsboro Gap, where the North Fork of Catoctin Creek breaks through Short Hill Mountain, part of the Blue Ridge Mountains of Virginia. The town is 4 miles (6 km) east of the West Virginia border and 11 miles (18 km) northwest of Leesburg, the Loudoun county seat.

According to the United States Census Bureau, the town has a total area of 0.27 square miles (0.7 km^{2}), all land.

== Transportation ==
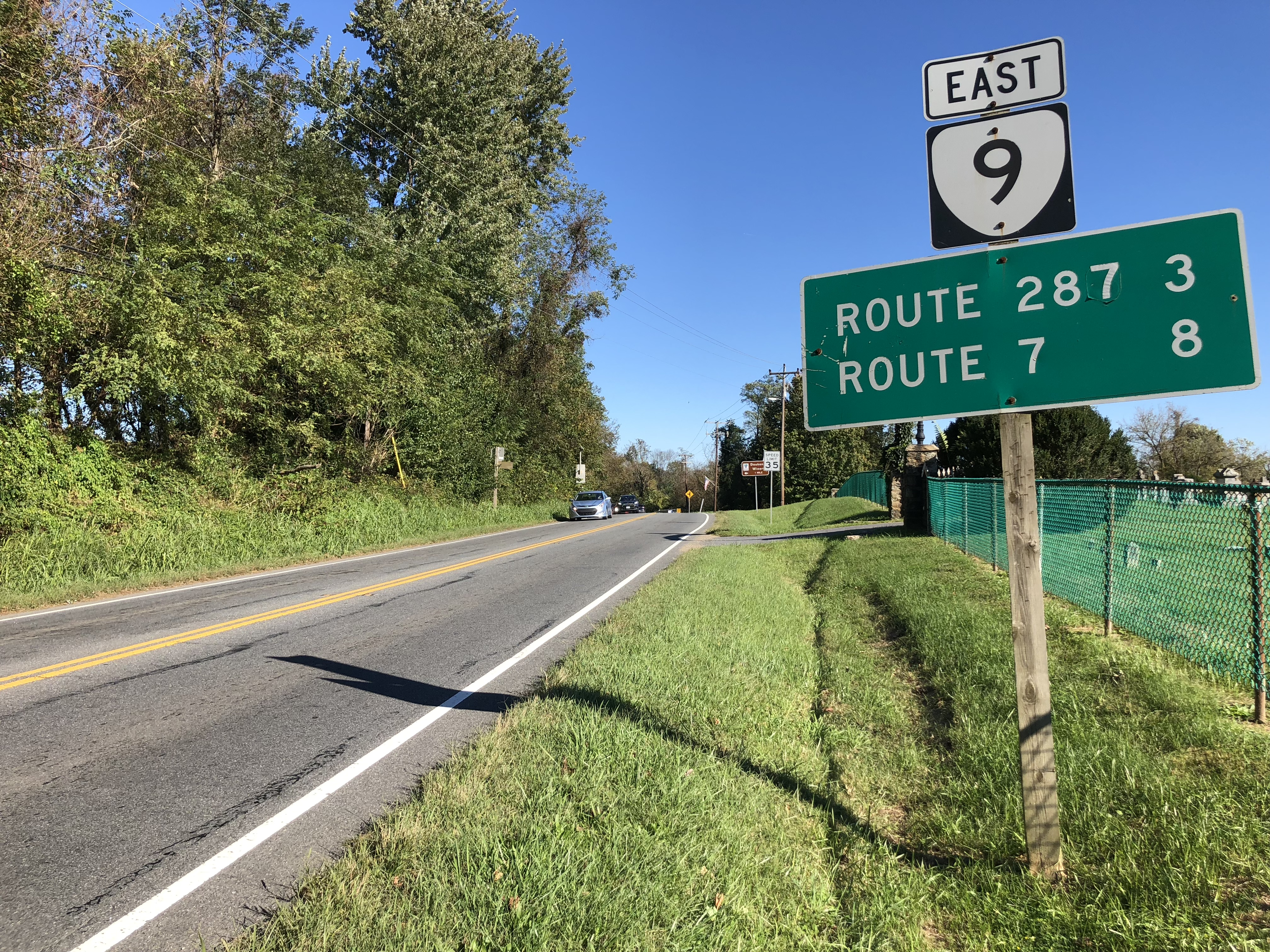
SR 9 in Hillsboro

Virginia State Route 9 (Charles Town Pike) is the only primary highway passing through Hillsboro. SR 9 extends northwest 12 miles (19 km) to Charles Town and 26 miles (42 km) to Martinsburg, West Virginia, also connecting with Interstate 81. To the southeast, SR 9 connects with Virginia State Route 7, which continues southeastward to Leesburg and Alexandria. Between Leesburg and Alexandria, SR 7 interchanges with Interstate 495, Interstate 66, and Interstate 395.

== Demographics ==
Historical population
Census	Pop.	Note	%±
1870	246		—
1880	137		−44.3%
1890	156		13.9%
1900	131		−16.0%
1910	138		5.3%
1920	131		−5.1%
1930	119		−9.2%
1940	115		−3.4%
1950	129		12.2%
1960	124		−3.9%
1970	135		8.9%
1980	115		−14.8%
1990	72		−37.4%
2000	96		33.3%
2010	80		−16.7%
2020	114		42.5%
U.S. Decennial Census

As of the census of 2000, there were 96 people, 39 households, and 28 families residing in the town. The population density was 1,017.9 inhabitants per square mile (393.0/km^{2}). There were 41 housing units at an average density of 434.7 per square mile (175.9/km^{2}). The racial makeup of the town was 96.88% White, and 3.12% African American.

There were 39 households, out of which 28.2% had children under the age of 18 living with them, 64.1% were married couples living together, 5.1% had a female householder with no husband present, and 28.2% were non-families. 20.5% of all households were made up of individuals, and 15.4% had someone living alone who was 65 years of age or older. The average household size was 2.46 and the average family size was 2.75.

In the town, the population was spread out, with 19.8% under the age of 18, 8.3% from 18 to 24, 28.1% from 25 to 44, 30.2% from 45 to 64, and 13.5% who were 65 years of age or older. The median age was 41 years. For every 100 females, there were 84.6 males. For every 100 females age 18 and over, there were 92.5 males.

The median income for a household in the town was $54,375, and the median income for a family was $71,875. Males had a median income of $60,833 versus $27,250 for females. The per capita income for the town was $44,455. There were 11.1% of families and 10.0% of the population living below the poverty line, including 25.0% of under eighteens and none of those over 64.

== History, culture and notes ==
Hillsboro originally spelled "Hillsborough,” lies in the Hillsboro Gap of Short Hill Mountain, which is part of the Blue Ridge Mountains in northwestern Virginia. The town is about 50 miles (80 km) northwest of downtown Washington, D.C. and 10 miles (16 km) south of Harpers Ferry, West Virginia.

Early settlement in this area was stimulated by the growth of population in Pennsylvania of Germans and Quakers seeking religious freedom. Looking south for new, fertile lands to farm, many Quaker families migrated to the Loudoun area and had a significant impact on its development. The first record of settlement in the Hillsboro area, then referred to as the Gap, is dated 1746. Records of twice monthly meetings of the Gap Quakers, held in one of the houses, date to 1755.

Although there were mills and houses in the Gap in the late 1700s, the town of Hillsboro (spelled Hillsborough until its 1880 incorporation) was not formally established until December 31, 1802 by an act passed by the Virginia General Assembly. The trustees of Hillsboro named in the act were Mahlon Hough, Samuel Purcell, Jr., Thomas Leslie, Josiah White, Jr., Edward Cunard, Mahlon Roach, and Thomas D. Stevens. By June 20, 1811, when Henry Griffin bought lot No. 12 on the town plat at auction for $88.50 paid to the trustees, he was required to build ‘a House thereon Twelve feet Square or equal thereto with a Stone or Brick Chimney to the same and a Shingle Roof on it within Four years of the Day of the Sale of the said lott.’ Due to its favorable location on the Vestal's Gap Road, the town grew quickly and in the early 1800s was one of the leading trade centers of western Loudoun, along with Snickerville (Bluemont) and Woodgrove, which has since disappeared. Much of Hillsboro's activity was due to its mills, with as many as five operating at one time, all on Catoctin Creek or its nearby branches.

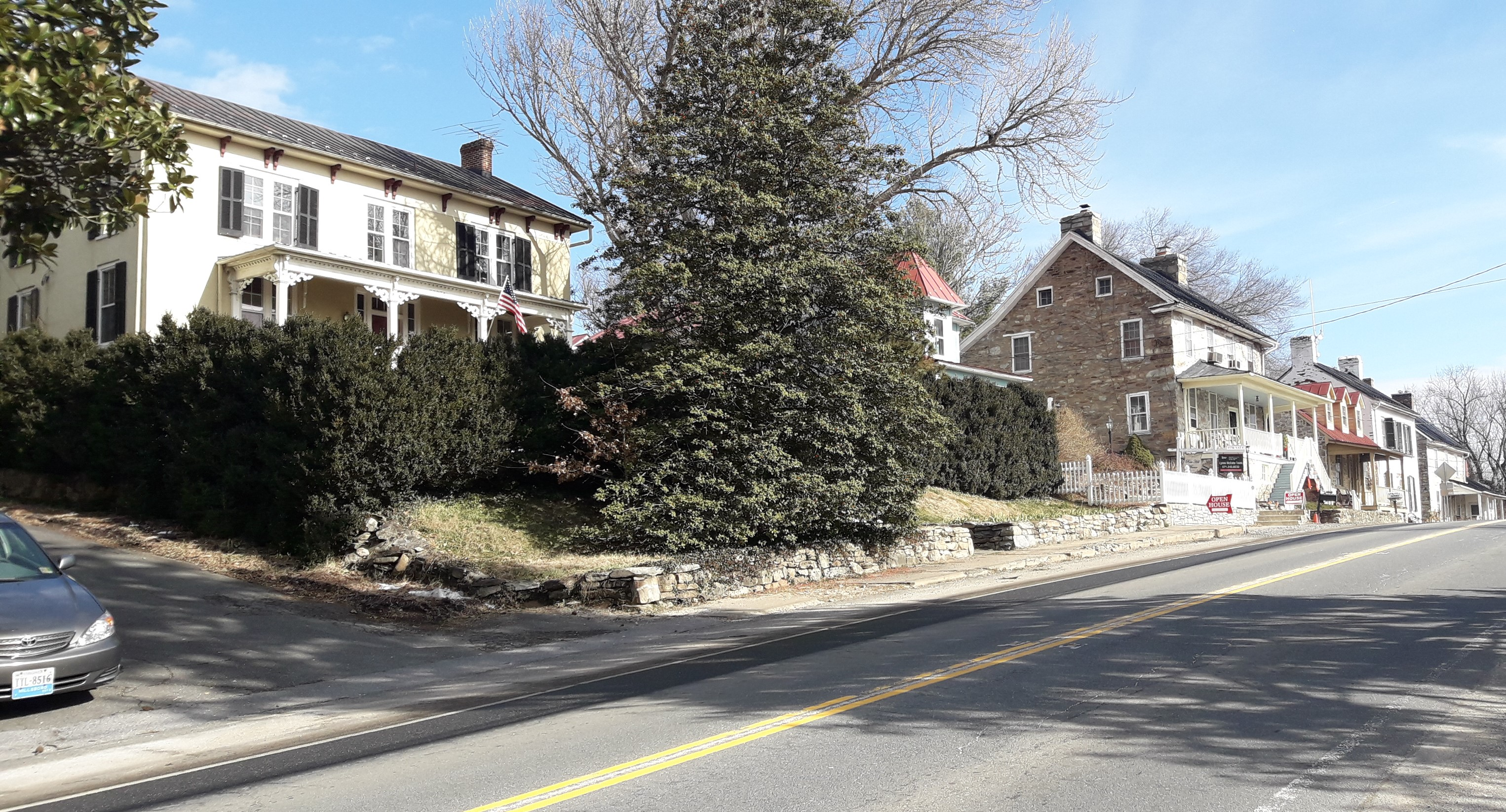
A row of nineteenth century houses in Hillsboro

During this period there typically were three or four doctors in town, five or six general stores, a large tanyard and cooper shop, two shoemakers and three taverns. Two blacksmiths, two saddle and harness makers, two wagon makers and a livery stable tended to the needs found in the horsepowered era. Seamstresses and tailors made clothes from the yarn goods produced by the Gaver woolen mill.

However, the newly constructed railroads and turnpikes bypassed Hillsboro, drawing trade and commerce away from the town. The Civil War events, including the Burning Raid of 1864, devastated the area. During the post-Civil War period, Hillsboro began its transformation from a busy commercial center to a primarily residential community. Homes formerly housing taverns, shops and stores gradually became residences. With the turn of the 20th century, virtually all of the currently existing structures within the town had been built and little has been altered in the majority of the structures since then.

Until 2000 there were no street addresses for the buildings in town; the 60-odd buildings in Hillsboro were referred to by their owners' names or their purposes.

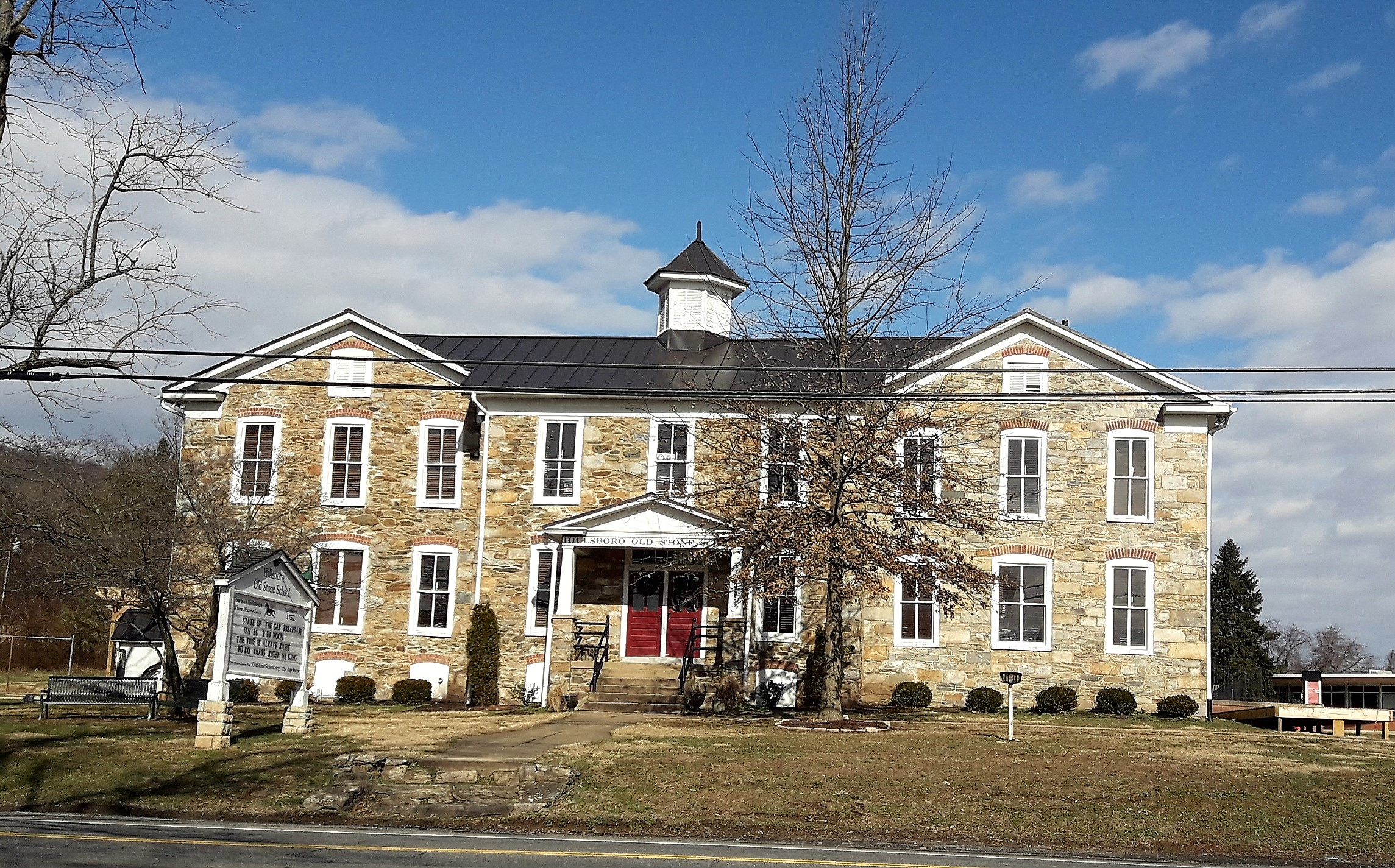
Old Stone School in Hillsboro

A central feature of the town is its Old Stone School. Originally named Locust Grove Academy, the oldest part of the building, the east wing, was built in 1874. The academy's first principal was Mrs. J.B. White. The Old Stone School, as it is referred to now, is situated at the eastern entrance to the town on Route 9. The stone structure was completed in 1917 with the addition of more rooms on the west side. A junior high school was established there in 1918 and operated for 17 years, until 1935. The brick auditorium was added in 1929. Classes for grades one through seven were taught there until the spring of 1966, when Hillsboro Elementary opened. The school was the hub of the community in the early 1900s. Community plays were frequently held there with a local orchestra that played during intermission.

Located next to the Old Stone School is Hillsboro Charter Academy, which opened in 2016 inside the former Hillsboro Elementary.

The Hillsboro Historic District was placed on the National Register of Historic Places on May 7, 1979.

In 2015, Hillsboro was the third smallest town in Virginia in population.

On December 28, 2016, the town limits officially tripled to 172 acres (70 ha). The zoning change brought the Old Stone School inside the town limits for the first time.

In June 2021, Hillsboro completed ReThink9, a $30 million infrastructure project which included creating two roundabouts on State Route 9 east and west of the town, traffic-calming streetscaping, burial of all overhead utilities, a new safe drinking water system, wastewater management infrastructure as well as an underground stormwater management system.

== Notable people ==
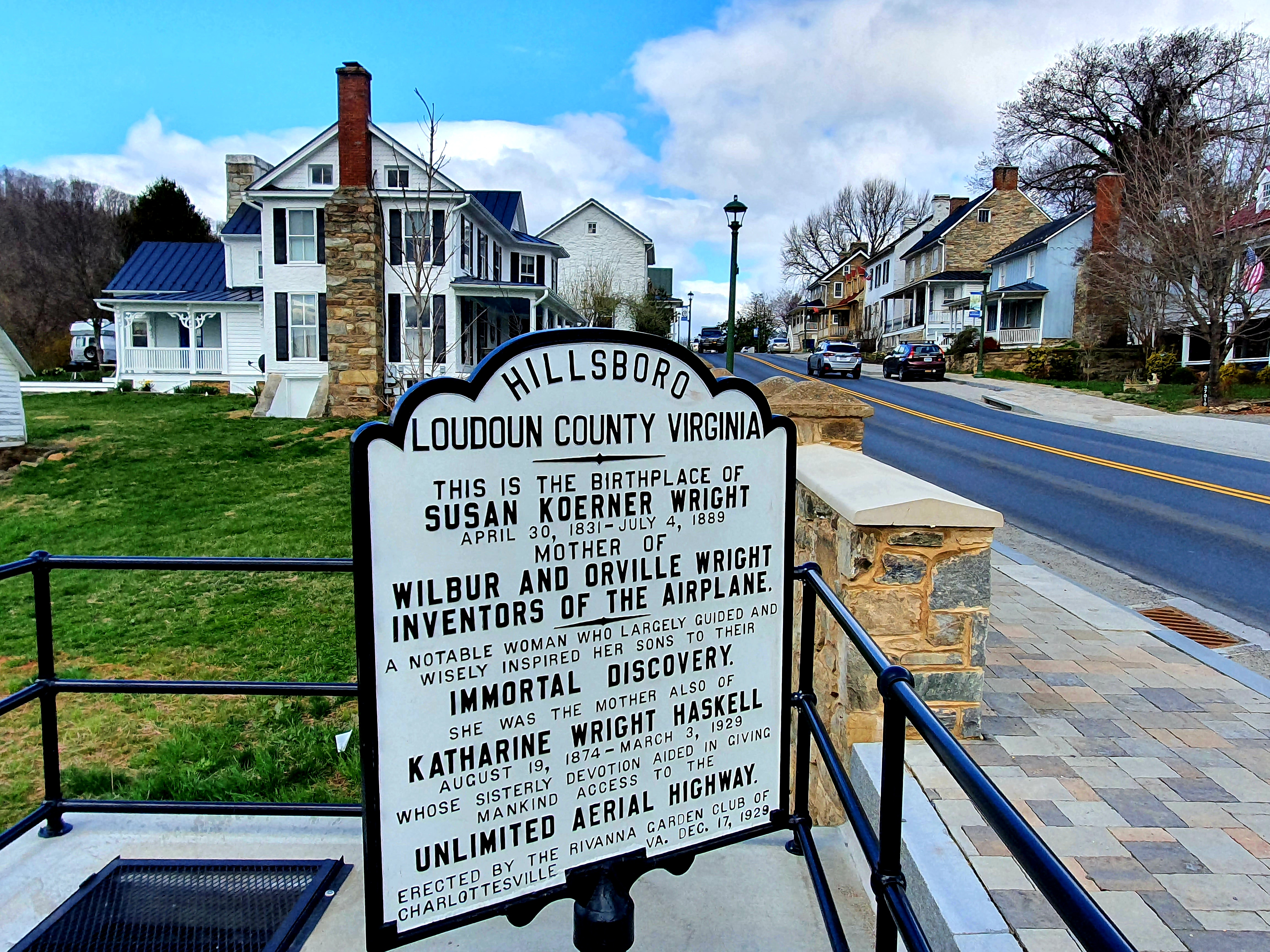
Susan Koerner Wright plaque on Charles Town Pike in Hillsboro

- Byron Farwell was mayor of the town for three terms from 1976 to 1982; other mayors included Sandy Muir and Alix Spaith.
- John B. Funk (1905–1993), Maryland state politician and secretary of state of Maryland.
- The family of Mary Virginia Gaver, a leader in library science, owned and operated Gaver Woolen Mill in Hillsboro in the 1800s.
- Susan Koerner Wright, the mother of the Wright brothers, was born near Hillsboro.
