= Keyes Gap =

- Location within Virginia
- Elevation: 906 ft (276 m)
- Traversed by: SR 9/ WV 9

Third Approach
- Location: Loudoun County, Virginia / Jefferson County, West Virginia, United States
- Range: Blue Ridge Mountains; Appalachian Mountains
- Coordinates: 39°16′N 77°46′W

Keyes Gap or Keyes' Gap is a wind gap in the Blue Ridge Mountain on the border of Loudoun County, Virginia and Jefferson County, West Virginia. The gap is traversed by Virginia State Route 9/West Virginia Route 9. The Appalachian Trail also crosses the gap.

== History ==
Originally known as Vestal's Gap, the 906 feet (276 m) gap is one of the lowest crossings of the Blue Ridge in Virginia. During the colonial period the main road between Alexandria and Winchester ran through the gap. As such, part of General Edward Braddock's army under George Washington crossed through the gap on their way to Fort Duquesne during the French and Indian War.

By 1820, the main route west became the newly completed Snickers Gap Turnpike which crossed the Blue Ridge to the south at Snickers Gap, and Keyes Gap lost its prominence. Despite this, Keyes Gap was still of strategic importance during the American Civil War, as it provided an alternate "back route" from Virginia to the key point of Harpers Ferry.

== See also ==
- Vestal's Gap Road and Lanesville Historic District
