= Loudoun County, Virginia, in the American Civil War =

Loudoun County, Virginia, was destined to be an area of significant military activity during the American Civil War. Located on Virginia's northern frontier, the Potomac River, Loudoun County became a borderland after Virginia's secession from the Union in early 1861. Loudoun County's numerous Potomac bridges, ferries and fords made it an ideal location for the Union and Confederate armies to cross into and out of Virginia. Likewise, the county's several gaps in the Blue Ridge Mountains that connected the Piedmont to the Shenandoah Valley and Winchester were of considerable strategic importance. The opposing armies would traverse the county several times throughout the war leading to several small battles, most notably the Battle of Ball's Bluff.

The fertile Loudoun Valley, with its wealth of produce and livestock, was of vital importance to the Confederacy and ideal to provide forage for the Union army. Furthermore, Loudoun County's population was deeply divided over secession, and tensions and hostilities against one-time neighbors added to the death and destruction wrought during the war. Bitter partisan warfare kept hostilities active even when the armies were far from Loudoun County. Because of its importance to the Confederacy and the partisans who inhabited it, the Loudoun Valley was put to the torch in The Burning Raid in 1864. It has been said that no county in Virginia that did not witness a decisive battle suffered more than Loudoun.

== Background ==
=== Strategic location ===
Located just 35 miles (56 km) west-northwest of Washington, D.C., on the south bank of the Potomac River and at the foot of the Blue Ridge, Loudoun served as a connection between northeastern Virginia and the lower Shenandoah Valley as well as between northern Virginia and central Maryland. It was also seen by the Union as a potential staging point for an attack on Washington by way of the Rockville Pike (present-day Maryland Route 355).

==== Transportation ====
Four principal road systems, passing through three gaps in the Blue Ridge, traversed Loudoun from east to west, connecting the county and its neighbor to the east, Fairfax, with those of Clarke and Frederick counties, as well as with Jefferson County, which became part of West Virginia during the war. Fighting occurred along all of these routes as both armies tried to defend or contest the use of the strategic gaps.

- Little River Turnpike/Ashby's Gap Turnpike – Ashby's Gap
- Little River Turnpike/Snickersville Turnpike – Snickers Gap
- Alexandria Pike/ Leesburg and Snickers Gap Turnpike – Snickers Gap
- Alexandria Pike/Charlestown Pike – Keyes Gap

During the war, the county had three bridges, three ferries, and at least three fords across the Potomac into Maryland connecting the county with Frederick and Montgomery counties. These crossings represented the only points of travel across the river above Great Falls and east of the Blue Ridge.

Listed from east to west, they were:

- Rosner's Ford - Used by J.E.B. Stuart as he left belatedly for Gettysburg
- Edwards Ferry - Used by the Union army to cross into Maryland during the Gettysburg campaign
- Conrad's (White's) Ferry - Used by J.E.B. Stuart on his return from the Maryland Campaign
- White's Ford - Used by the Army of Northern Virginia at the beginning of the Maryland Campaign
- Cheek's Ford - Used by the Army of Northern Virginia at the beginning of the Maryland Campaign
- Noland's Ferry - Used by John G. Walker's artillery prior to the Battle of Harpers Ferry
- Point of Rocks Bridge - Burned by General Thomas Jackson June 9, 1861
- Berlin Bridge (at present day Brunswick) - Burned by General Thomas Jackson June 9, 1861
- Harpers Ferry Bridge - Burned by General Thomas Jackson June 9, 1861

The Carolina Road (present-day U.S. Route 15) was the principle north-south thoroughfare, crossing the river at Point of Rocks near Noland's Ferry. It intersected the Alexandria Pike (present-day Route 7) at Leesburg and the Little River Turnpike (present-day U.S. Route 50) near Aldie.

In addition to road transportation, Loudoun was the terminus of the Alexandria, Loudoun and Hampshire Railroad, which ran between Leesburg and Alexandria. The unfinished Loudoun Branch of the Manassas Gap Railroad was also graded as far west as the Carolina Road in Loudoun, with tracks laid to Gum Springs. Furthermore, the C&O Canal and B&O Railroad, both vital links between Washington and the west, ran past Loudoun on the Maryland shore of the Potomac.

Loudoun County area during the Civil War

==== Geography ====
Beside the main ridge making up the county's western border, two ridges of the Blue Ridge Mountains run through the county. These mountains played a significant role in the settlement of the county and thus the division of its loyalties during the war. Several of the mountains and tall hills in the county were used as signal and spy stations by both sides during the conflict. In addition the ridges helped create an ideal environment for partisan warfare. The easternmost ridge is the south end of Catoctin Mountain, which comes down out of Maryland at Point of Rocks. The low-lying ridge extends through the county just west of Leesburg to Aldie, where it meets with Bull Run Mountain at the Loudoun-Prince William County border. To the west of the ridge lies the fertile Loudoun Valley.

The northern portion of the Loudoun Valley is bisected by Short Hill Mountain, which extends from the Potomac to just south of Hillsboro. The Charlestown Pike (present-day Route 9) ran through the Hillsboro Gap in Short Hill at Hillsboro into Jefferson County, while the Winchester Turnpike ran to the south of the mountain. Despite its name, Short Hill Mountain is an imposing feature, even today, and kept the area to its west, known as Between the Hills, isolated from the rest of the county.

=== Settlement, slavery and sentiments ===
The settlement of Loudoun County occurred through two distinct patterns. First, between 1725 and 1730, English settlers from the Tidewater region moved into the areas east of Catoctin Mountain and in the southern Loudoun Valley. They brought with them many of the Cavalier attitudes associated with Virginians, as well as plantation-style agriculture and its use of slaves. Among these settlers were many of Virginia's aristocratic families including the Masons, Lees and Carters, the latter of whom established Oatlands Plantation, the largest in the county. Citizens living in this part of the county generally supported the Confederacy once war erupted, regardless of slave ownership.

Then, between 1730 and 1735, Quaker and German settlers moved south from Pennsylvania into the northern Loudoun Valley, establishing small farming operations in the Catoctin Valley around the areas of Lovettsville, Waterford, and as far south as Lincoln. The small, self-sufficient nature of the farms they established, as well as their religious convictions, precluded the use of slaves in these areas. During the Civil War, this region stayed loyal to the Union cause.

In addition, throughout the 18th century, Scotch-Irish settlers trickled into the county settling the more mountainous regions along the Catoctin and Blue Ridge Mountain and the Between the Hills valley. These settlers were generally poor and had small land holdings with few if any slaves; still, they tended to support the Confederate cause.

The 1860 census showed 670 slave owners holding 5,501 slaves in the county of 21,774 inhabitants (there were also 1,252 free blacks). Only 50% of slaveholders in the county owned more than five slaves, and only 2% had more than 20. 71% of farmers in the county owned no slaves.

=== John Brown's Raid ===
Ties between Loudoun and the American Civil War began with the involvement of the county in the suppression of John Brown's raid on Harpers Ferry, just 1 mile (1.6 km) from its border, in 1859. The county militia was called into service, and two companies were sent to Harpers Ferry and later Charles Town to assist with the capture, trial and execution of Brown. The crisis brought to light the inadequacy and ill preparedness of the county militia. Subsequently, the county increased drilling, appropriated new arms and uniforms and raised new units. As early as November 4 the first new unit, the Volunteer Corps (from Hillsboro, the closest town to Harpers Ferry), was formed, and by early December two additional units, the Loudoun Guard and Leesburg Civic Guard, had been raised. These units, in addition the militia units called up by Governor Henry Wise, remained active patrolling the county's northern borders, especially the mountains and river crossings, until they were absorbed into state service in 1861.

=== The sectional crisis ===
==== The election of 1860 ====
Prior to the growing division between North and South leading up to the Civil War, Loudoun County politics was firmly Whig in nature. Despite that party's collapse in the 1850s, Loudoun remained true to its principles and was strongly for the preservation of the Union. When the presidential election of 1860 came, Loudoun overwhelmingly supported John Bell and the Constitutional Union Party, who received 2,033 of the 2,942 votes cast in the county. Coming in a distant second was the Southern Democratic nominee John C. Breckinridge with 778 votes. Stephen Douglas, the Northern Democrat, received a scant 120 votes, and Abraham Lincoln received 11 votes despite not even being on the ticket. The 11 votes came from the precincts of Lovettsville, Waterford and Purcellville. Since the ballot was not then secret, those voting for Lincoln supposedly came to the polls armed.

Even after Lincoln's election, Loudoun was still committed to the Union. On December 10, days before South Carolina's secession, a public meeting was held at the court house in Leesburg about the increasing sectional tensions. Attendees of the meeting elected a council of nine of Loudoun's most prominent citizens to draft a preamble and set of resolutions about the county's position in the crisis. After deliberation the council submitted the preamble, which strongly supported Virginia remaining in the Union, and 12 resolutions, which dealt mostly with ways the grievances between north and south might be remedied. The gathering adopted the preamble and every resolution but one. By a vote of 92 to 65, the group rejected the resolution denouncing Federal coercion to prevent secession.

==== The secession convention ====
On February 13, 1861, the Commonwealth of Virginia convened a special convention in Richmond to decide Virginia's course in the rapidly developing conflict. Special elections were held in the county to decide who would represent the county to this convention. Seven candidates ran (most were Unionists or moderates) and, despite the Leesburg platform, all denounced Federal coercion. Loudoun's two most prominent politicians and avowed Unionists, John Janney and John A. Carter (county representatives to the constitutional convention of 1850), won with 1,945 and 1,411 votes respectively. In comparison, John Carter, the only outright secessionist candidate, received just 293 votes. Loudoun also overwhelmingly supported the ballot initiative that provided that an ordinance of secession must be ratified by the people by referendum. Janney, a former Whig, one-time potential vice-presidential candidate and well-respected lawyer among the Virginia Bar, was named president of the convention. The sagacious Janney opened the convention saying,

It is our duty on an occasion like this to elevate ourselves into an atmosphere, in which party passion and prejudice cannot exist - to conduct all our deliberations with calmness and wisdom, and to maintain, with inflexible firmness, whatever position we may find it necessary to assume.

Even as this convention was being held, Loudoun began to sway in its opinion and, before Fort Sumter, a meeting was held in Leesburg, in which a resolution was adopted endorsing an Ordinance of Secession. Five days after the fall of Fort Sumter and Lincoln's call for 75,000 troops, the convention passed the Ordinance of Secession. Janney and Carter voted against the measure. Despite their vote, once secession was approved they went loyally with their state, reversing their votes afterwards. As president of the convention, Janney was given the honor of handing over to Robert E. Lee the forces of the Commonwealth. In his introduction of Lee to the convention, he conjured up connections with George Washington, saying the prophetic words,

When the father of this Country made his last will in testament, he gave his swords to his favorite nephews with instruction that should never be drawn from their scabbards except in self defense or in the defense of the rights and liberties of their Country, and, that if drawn for the latter purpose, they should fall with them in their hands, rather than relinquish them.

Though Loudoun originally called for maintaining the Union, the Ordinance was ratified by Loudoun County on May 23 by a vote of 1,626 to 726. The votes against secession came primarily from the northwestern part of the county, where some precincts voted as much as 7 to 1 against the Ordinance. The southern and eastern portions were strongly in favor of the measure, with some precincts voting unanimously in its favor.

Loyalties in Loudoun: red for Union; grey for Confederate

Precincts	For Secession	Against Secession
Aldie	54	5
Goresville	117	19
Gum Spring	135	5
Hillsboro	84	38
Leesburg	400	22
Lovettsville	46	325
Middleburg	115	0
Mt. Gilead	102	19
Powells Shop	62	0
Purcellville	82	31
Snickersville	114	3
Union (Unison)	150	0
Waterford	31	220
Waters	26	39
Whaleys	108	0
Totals	1626	726

== Units and people ==
On April 18, one day after the passage of the Ordinance of Secession, yet over a full month before its passage by referendum, Governor John Letcher called out the Loudoun Militia in anticipation of the state's seizure of the Federal arsenal at Harpers Ferry. The units drilled for 9 days before being ordered to Alexandria rather than Harpers Ferry, which was promptly abandoned without a fight. The militia fell back on Manassas Junction, where they were organized into regiments and battalions. Meanwhile, back in Loudoun, recruiting efforts got underway, with men like William E. Harrison, James McCarty, both Virginia Military Institute graduates, and Eppa Hunton setting up shop in Leesburg. The first two were recruiting for the newly created professional Provisional Army of Virginia, while Hunton was recruiting for the Volunteer army. Professional soldiering was unattractive to most Loudoun men, and only four regiments from Loudoun were raised. Hunton, meanwhile raised an additional two companies to supplement the four militia units already absorbed into his regiment.

On the other side of the mountain from Leesburg, in the Catoctin Valley, an entirely different situation had arisen. When the militia was called up, the 56th regiment out of Goresville, which drew from men on both sides of the mountain, mustered only the 60% of its ranks coming from the east of the Catoctin. Faced with threats of arrest and property confiscation, many of Loudoun's most staunch and prominent Unionists began trickling across the Potomac into Maryland, including Samuel C. Means, Loudoun's wealthiest miller. Many of these men enlisted in border units, such as the Maryland Home Brigades, forming on the north bank of the river.

Recruiting efforts for partisan units continued in the county throughout the war, most notably in late 1861 and early 1862, when Elijah White raised a Confederate command at Leesburg and Samuel Means the Union company at Waterford. Beginning in 1863 to the end of the war, John Mosby regularly attracted Loudouners to his partisan command.

=== Confederate units ===
Infantry:

- 8th Virginia Infantry,
  - Co. A, Hillborough Border Guard (Volunteer Corps)
  - Co. D
  - Co. E, Capt. Mandley Hampton's Co.
  - Co. F, Blue Mountain Boys
  - Co. H
  - Co. I, Capt. James R. Simpson's Co.
- 17th Virginia Infantry
  - Co. C, Loudoun Guard

Cavalry:

- 1st Virginia Cavalry
  - Co. H, Loudoun Light Horse (Carter's Company)
- 6th Virginia Cavalry
  - Co. A, Loudoun Dragoons (The Dulany Troop)
  - Co. K, Loudoun Cavalry
- 7th Virginia Cavalry
  - Co. G, (Mason's Rangers)
- 11th Virginia Cavalry
  - Co. H, Octavus T. Weems' Co.

Artillery:

- Longstreet's Corps
  - Loudoun Artillery (Rogers')

Partisan:

- 35th Battalion of Virginia Cavalry- "The Comanches"
  - Co. A, White's Rebels
- 43rd Battalion Virginia Cavalry – "Mosby's Rangers"
- John Mobberly's Gang

In addition to these Loudoun units, men from Loudoun served in the Richmond Howitzers, Stuart's Horse Artillery, Chew's Battery, Stribbling's Artillery, Gilmore's Battalion, the 34th Virginia Artillery, 40th Virginia Infantry and the 1st and 7th Georgia Infantry.

=== Union units ===
Cavalry:

- 1st Maryland Cavalry Regiment

Partisan and Border Guards:

- The Loudoun Rangers – "Mean's Rangers"
  - Co. A
  - Co. B
- 1st Maryland Cavalry Potomac Home Brigade - "Cole's Cavalry"
- 1st Maryland Infantry, Potomac Home Brigade - "Maulsby's Brigade"
- Blazer's Scouts

=== Important figures of Loudoun in the war ===
- John Janney – Delegate to and president of the Virginia Secession Convention
- Robert Chilton – Aide to Robert E. Lee, transcriber of the famed "Lost Order"
- Eppa Hunton - Colonel, leader of the 8th Va. Infantry
- Elijah V. White – Colonel, leader of the 35th Battalion Va Cav.; last leader of the famed Laurel Brigade
- Samuel C. Means – Prominent Loudoun Unionist, founder and 1st commander of the Loudoun Rangers
- John S. Mosby - Colonel, leader of the 43rd Battalion Va. Cav.
- John Mobberly – Infamous partisan

== Loudoun in the Eastern Theater ==
Confederate seizure of the Point of Rocks Bridge

=== The passing of the armies ===
Loudoun served initially as an outpost of the Confederate army based out of Winchester. From the garrison at Leesburg, the Confederates conducted raids and recruitment drives into central Maryland, carting away men and supplies, as well as threatening the C&O Canal, B&O Railroad and Washington. To meet this threat, Federals deployed along the Loudoun-Maryland border, leading to many skirmishes at the strategic river crossings. Later, after that post was abandoned, Loudoun served as point of crossing between the Piedmont and the Shenandoah Valley, as well as between Virginia and Maryland. All of the Army of Northern Virginia passed through the county on its way to Antietam, while the Army of the Potomac crossed the county on its way back from that battle. Again in 1863 the Army of the Potomac used Loudoun to get to and return from Gettysburg. Finally, in 1864, Jubal Early and his Federal pursuers used Loudoun to pass from the D.C. environs to the Shenandoah Valley after the Battle of Fort Stevens. In all, the county changed hands six during the course of the war, and the passing of the armies led to many small conflicts in the county.

==== The Confederate occupation June 1861 - March 1862 ====
- Rockville Expedition
  - Skirmish at Conrad's Ferry, June 17, 1861
  - Skirmish at Edward's Ferry, June 18, 1861; July 29, 1861
- McClellan's operations in Northern Virginia
  - Battle of Ball's Bluff and Edwards Ferry, October 20–23, 1861
  - Battle of Dranesville, December 21, 1861
- Border skirmishes
  - Skirmish at River Mill, September 15, 1861

==== The Federal invasion by Colonel John Geary March 1862 - August 1862 ====
View of Loudoun Heights from Harpers Ferry

In early 1862, the Union army began amassing at Harper's Ferry in preparation for operations in the Shenandoah Valley. Part of this force, under the command of Col. John W. Geary, was charged with the undertaking of securing Loudoun County and the army's left flank from across the Blue Ridge as it operated in the Valley. On February 24, Geary set out across the Potomac from Harpers Ferry, but high water delayed his crossing, and it was not until the 27th that his force was fully across into Loudoun. Geary placed his artillery atop an eminence of Short Hill Mountain and proceeded with his main force to occupy Lovettsville, a German settlement in the heart of Unionist Loudoun, where he established his headquarters.

On March 6, Brigadier General D.H. Hill was ordered to abandon Loudoun County to join with Gen. Joseph E. Johnston in Richmond to halt McClellan's drive up the Virginia Peninsula. The following day, Geary's force left its camp at Lovettsville. As Hill retreated, his forces set fire to Confederate supplies, nearby forage and the Carolina Road's bridge over Goose Creek. By the end of the day, Union forces occupied Leesburg, establishing headquarters at Fort Johnston, rechristened Fort Geary, and imposing martial law on the secessionist town. Leaving a small garrison at Leesburg, Geary set out the following day to pursue the retreating Confederates.

By the 15th, Geary's men had traversed the county and reached Upperville, and all of Loudoun County was under Federal occupation. Two weeks later, E.V. White's Confederate cavalry challenged Geary's force near Middleburg. In the engagement, Federals brought out the newly developed coffee mill gun, a forerunner to the modern machine gun. The results were devastating—the Confederate line was cut to pieces after being fired upon from 800 yards, and those not immediately cut down retreated, unsure of what had just hit them. The gun, however, was deemed to unsafe to operate and never used widely in the war.

- Skirmish at Loudoun Heights - February 27, 1862
- Skirmish at Lovettsville - February 28, 1862
- Skirmish at Wheatland and Waterford - March 7, 1862
- Skirmish at Middleburg - March 26–28, 1862
- Skirmish at Loudoun Heights - May 27, 1862

==== General Robert E. Lee's Maryland Campaign: September 1862 ====
Following the victory at the Second Battle of Manassas, General Lee elected not to attack the Union army behind its fortifications around Washington D.C., but to instead take his army into Loudoun County to obtain forage and reorganize for his planned invasion of Maryland. Fighting broke out in the county in advance of the army's arrival as Confederate cavalry cleared the area of Federal resistance. The army stopped over briefly in Leesburg from September 4–6 where it underwent its reorganization, before crossing over the Potomac to Maryland at Cheeks Ford and Conrad's Ferry. On the 9th, General John G. Walker was dispatched back to the county with order to take Loudoun Heights as part of the plan to capture Harpers Ferry. Walker occupied the Heights from September 13–15, before crossing the river into Harpers Ferry following its capture.

- Battle of Mile Hill, September 2, 1861
- Battle of Harpers Ferry, September 12–15, 1862
- Skirmish at Leesburg - September 15, 1862

==== McClellan's return to Virginia: October - November 1862 ====
Following the bloody fight at the Battle of Antietam, J.E.B. Stuart set out from Williamsport, Maryland north towards Chambersburg, Pennsylvania, and then southeast to encircle McClellan's army for the second time in less than a year in order to reconnoiter their strength and movements. On October 10 he crossed back into Virginia at White's Ford, where he briefly skirmished with his Federal pursuers, bringing with him some 1,200 horses he and his men had captured. He rested for a day after the crossing northeast of Leesburg before moving south to the town to pick up the Winchester Turnpike west into the Shenandoah Valley by way of Snickers Gap.

- Skirmish at White's Ford - October 10, 1862

On October 27, George B. McClellan and his Army of the Potomac belatedly reentered Virginia in pursuit of Lee. The Union army crossed the Potomac River around Berlin (present day Brunswick, Maryland) and Harpers Ferry and then proceeded down the Loudoun Valley, foraging off local farms. While in Loudoun, McClellan set up headquarters in Wheatland, Purcellville and Unison. As the Federals moved through the county, Col. E.V. White and his Comanches struck at the supply trains and managed to capture 1,000 prisoners and 200 wagons. Likewise General J.E.B Stuart and his cavalry sparred with the advancing Federal columns in an effort to screen the movement of the Army of Northern Virginia below the Rappahannock River. Stuart's actions further delayed McClellan's pursuit and contributed to the eventual removal of McClellan from command of the army.

- Battle of Unison, October 29 - November 1, 1862

==== The Gettysburg Campaign: June - July, 1863 ====
Following the Battle of Chancellorsville, the Army of Northern Virginia again marched north to cross the Potomac. While Lee's main body this time stayed west of the Blue Ridge Mountains, he sent the divisions of John Bell Hood and George Pickett east of the mountains through Loudoun County to guard the mountain passes and protect his right flank. In addition to Hood and Pickett, J.E.B. Stuart's cavalry was kept east of the mountains to prevent the Union cavalry from pinning down the location of the Confederate Army. While moving through Loudoun County, Stuart engaged in a series of battles along the Ashby's Gap Turnpike as Union cavalry commander Brig. Gen. Alfred Pleasonton attempted to break through Stuart's screen and locate the Confederate army.

As the cavalry fight raged along the Ashby's Gap Turnpike, Maj. Gen. Joseph Hooker began his pursuit of Lee and entered Loudoun County on June 17 and headed to Edwards Ferry, where pontoon bridges had been assembled. Over the next eleven days, the entire Army of the Potomac came through the county and crossed the Potomac at Edwards Ferry. In addition to securing Edwards Ferry, the Union army covered all major crossings of the river up to Harpers Ferry. As a result, as J.E.B. Stuart prepared to leave the county and join up with Ewell in Pennsylvania, he was forced to circumnavigate the Union army and cross downriver, where the river is deeper and wider at Rowsner's Ford at the extreme eastern end of the county. With much difficulty, Stuart and his three brigades crossed the river on June 27, several days behind schedule, leaving Lee and the Army of Northern Virginia blind as they embarked on their second northern invasion.

- Battle of Aldie, June 17, 1863
- Battle of Middleburg, June 17–19, 1863
- Battle of Upperville, June 21, 1863

==== General Early's Valley Campaign and Washington, D.C. Raid: July, 1864 ====
Following his raid on the B&O railroad, central Maryland and aborted attack on Washington D.C. at the Battle of Fort Stevens, Confederate General Jubal A. Early retreated to Virginia, crossing the Potomac at Conrad's Ferry on July 14, making camp at Big Springs just north of Leesburg. On the 15th a detachment of Federal cavalry from Harpers Ferry led by General George Crook crossed into Loudoun from Berlin and skirmished with Confederates at Lovettsville. Early's Federal pursuers under General Horatio Wright reached Leesburg on the 16th and fought with Early's rearguard at Leesburg in the morning. Crook's cavalry skirmished with Confederate cavalry at Waterford later in the day. Late in the afternoon on the 16th, Federal cavalry under Alfred N. Duffié, also operating from Harpers Ferry, raided Early's wagon trains as they traveled west towards Snickers Gap on the Leesburg and Snickers Gap Turnpike just east of Purcellville at Heatons' Crossroads. That evening at dusk, Duffié's cavalry attacked and routed a detachment of Confederate cavalry in camp at Woodgrove. Early safely withdrew across the Blue Ridge on the 17th and established a line near Berryville in the Shenandoah Valley. The Union infantry under Wright drove off a small force of Confederates holding Snickers Gap in the afternoon of the 17th and were later attacked in camp by elements of Mosby's Rangers. The following day the pitched Battle of Cool Spring, or Snickers Ferry, was fought on its western slope as Union infantry tried unsuccessfully to force a crossing of the Shenandoah River. On the 19th, Mosby's Rangers engaged a detachment of Federal cavalry that was dispatched south to Ashby's Gap to conduct a flanking movement on Early's lines. The brief campaign was locally known as the Snickers Gap War.

- Heaton's Crossroads, July 16, 1864
- Skirmish at Woodgrove, July 16, 1864
- Battle of Snicker's Ferry, July 17–18, 1864
- Battle of Ashbys Gap, July 19, 1864

=== Partisan warfare in Loudoun ===
In between and during the passing of the armies through Loudoun, bitter sectional warfare raged in the county. Owing in part to its divided loyalties and in part to its ideal terrain, various partisan groups on both sides of the conflict routinely attacked one another, the nearby armies, and preyed on the citizens of the county.

Skirmish	Date	Confederate	Union	Result
Raid on Mount Gilead	August 1, 1862	8th Va Infantry	Cole's Cavalry; Potomac Home Brigade; Loudoun Rangers	Union victory
The Fight at Waterford	August 27, 1862	35th Battalion, Va. Cav	Loudoun Rangers	Confederate victory
The Affair at Glenmore Farm	October 16, 1862	35th Battalion, Va. Cav	6th New York Cav.	Union victory
Skirmish at Hillsboro	September 1, 1862	35th Battalion Va Cav.	Loudoun Rangers	Inconclusive
Skirmish at Waterford	December 1862	35th Battalion Va Cav.	Loudoun Rangers	Inconclusive
Skirmish at Leesburg	January 1863	35th Battalion Va Cav.	Loudoun Rangers	Inconclusive
Fight at Aldie	March 2, 1863	Mosby's Rangers	1st Vermont Cav.	Confederate victory
Skirmish at Snickers Gap	April 22, 1863	Confederate Cav. (unit unknown)	Loudoun Rangers	Inconclusive
Skirmish at Miskel Farm	April 1, 1863	Mosby's Rangers	2nd Pennsylvania Cav.	Confederate victory
Skirmish at Waterford	June 2, 1863	35th Battalion Va Cav.	Loudoun Rangers	Inconclusive
Skirmish on Catoctin Mountain	September 13, 1862	35th Battalion Va Cav.	Loudoun Rangers	Inconclusive
Skirmish at Middleburg	January 1, 1864	Mosby's Rangers	Cole's Maryland Cavalry	Confederate victory
Battle of Loudoun Heights	January 9, 1864	Mosby's Rangers	Cole's Maryland Cavalry	Union victory
Fight at Blackleys Grove	February 20, 1864	Mosby's Rangers	Cole's Maryland Cavalry	Confederate victory
Second Dranesville	February 22, 1864	Mosby's Rangers	2nd Massachusetts Cavalry; 16th New York Cavalry	Confederate victory
Skirmish at Waterford	May 16, 1864	Mobberly's Gang	Loudoun Rangers	Inconclusive
Skirmish at Leesburg	May 17, 1864	Mosby's Rangers	Louduon Rangers	Inconclusive
Skirmish at Wheatland	June 10, 1864	Mosby's Rangers	Loudoun Rangers	Inconclusive
Calico Raid	July 4, 1864	Mosby's Rangers	Loudoun Rangers	Confederate victory
Action at Mount Zion Church	July 6, 1864	Mosby's Rangers	2nd Massachusetts Cavalry; 13th New York Cavalry	Confederate victory
Snickers Gap War	July 15–19, 1864	Mosby's Rangers	Union IV and XIX Corps	Inconclusive
Skirmish at Taylorstown	August 19, 1864	Mobberly's Gang	Loudoun Rangers	Inconclusive
Skirmish at Leesburg	August 21, 1864	35th Battalion Va Cav.	Loudoun Rangers	Inconclusive
Skirmish at Paxton's Store	November 28, 1864	Mosby's Rangers	Loudoun Rangers	Inconclusive
George's Schoolhouse Raid	January 17, 1865	Mobberly's Gang; 35th Battalion Va. Cav. Mosby's Rangers	Thomas Devin's Cavalry	Inconclusive
The Harmony Skirmish	March 21, 1865	Mosby's Rangers	Loudoun Rangers; 12th Pennsylvania	Inconclusive

=== The depredation of Loudoun ===
"The Burning" in Loudoun County

- The Confederate evacuation
- The bombardment of Leesburg
- The Burning Raid of Major General Philip Sheridan

== Fortifications in Loudoun ==
=== Primary redoubts and forts ===
- Fort Evans - Constructed in the long Edwards Ferry Road in summer 1861, following the Rockville expedition, to defend the eastern approaches to Leesburg.
- Fort Johnston - Constructed atop Catoctin Mountain in the winter of 1861-62 to defend the western approaches to Leesburg.
- Fort Beauregard - Partially constructed atop a hill above Tuscarora Creek the winter of 1861-62 to defend the southeastern approaches to Leesburg.

=== Batteries and earthworks ===
- Edwards Ferry Rd - "The Masked Battery" - a 300 feet (91 m) long, 6 feet (1.8 m) deep trench across Edwards Ferry Road at Cattail Branch auxiliary of Fort Evans, used during the defense of Leesburg during the Battle of Ball's Bluff and Edwards Ferry. Evidence of the works can still be found near Edwards Ferry Road and Battlefield Parkway.
- Potomac Trenches
- Goose Creek - A series of three gunpits with cannon embrasures and infantry entrenchment atop Bluffs on the west bank of Goose Creek to defend the eastern approach to Leesburg along the Alexandria Turnpike after the wooden bridge over the creek had been burnt during the Rockville expedition. Evidence of the works can still be found north of modern-day Route 7.
- Loudoun Heights - Loudoun Heights was first fortified in 1861 by Stonewall Jackson as part of the defenses of Harpers Ferry. In 1862, during the Battle of Harpers Ferry Brigadier General John G. Walker constructed gun embrasures atop the mountain for his ordnance to aid in the siege of the town (see the Maryland Campaign section above). Following the Battle of Antietam, the Union army took possession of the mountain and enlarged its defenses, adding rifle pits, entrenchments and additional blockhouses. The fortifications were manned by Cole's Maryland Cavalry during the winter of 1863-1864 and were attacked by Mosby's Rangers during the Battle of Loudoun Heights.

=== Headquarters ===
- Harrison House: The headquarters of Robert E. Lee during his brief stay in Leesburg in September, 1862. In this house he met with his top generals, including Jackson and Stuart, to oversee the reorganization of the Army of Northern Virginia prior to the start of the Maryland Campaign.

== The Restored Government of Virginia ==
On December 5, 1864 the Restored Government of Virginia convened for the first time since the formal separation of West Virginia from the commonwealth (Loudoun, in fact had been briefly considered for inclusion in the new state, but was ultimately rejected due to the strong Confederate sentiment in the county) in the city hall of Alexandria. Loudoun was one of the twelve counties and three cities represented (those under nominal Federal control). James Madison Downey of Loudoun was elected to serve as speaker of the House of Delegates, and in that capacity brought legislation to the floor calling for a Constitutional Convention to be held that January. Downey would go on to serve as one of three representatives from Loudoun in that body, which among other things would approve the separation of West Virginia, thus circumventing the constitutional clause against forming a new state out of an existing one, and formally abolish slavery in Virginia. When the legislature reconvened the following December, Downey was once again elected speaker of the House. Although Loudoun was represented in the Restored Government, and elections for its offices were held in the county, the government's authority in the county extended only as far that of the Union army.

== Civil War tourism ==
Civil War tourism sites:

- Ball's Bluff Battlefield and National Cemetery
- Harpers Ferry National Historical Park
- Loudoun Museum
- Confederate Statue, Courthouse Square
- Union Cemetery
- Civil War Trails
