= List of American Civil War battles in Northern Virginia =

With less than 150 miles separating the two capital cities of Washington, D.C., and Richmond, Virginia, Northern Virginia found itself in the center of much of the conflict of the American Civil War. The area was the site of many battles and bloodshed. The Army of Northern Virginia was the primary army for the Confederate States of America in the east. Owing to the regions proximity to Washington D.C and the Potomac River, the armies of both sides frequently occupied and traversed Northern Virginia. As a result, several battles were fought in the area:

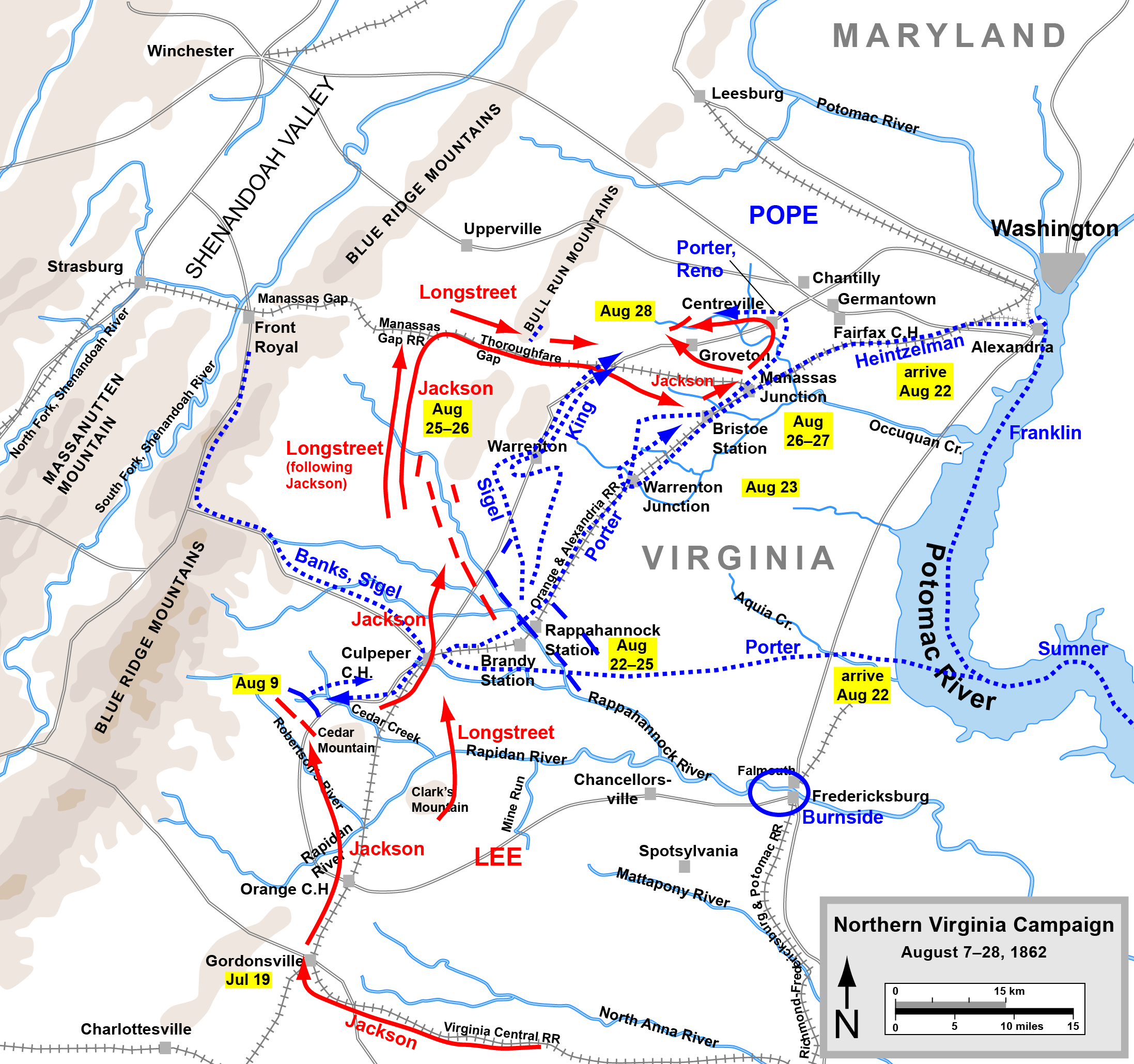
Northern Virginia Campaign, August 7– August 28, 1862. Confederate Union

City of Fredericksburg:

- First Battle of Fredericksburg
- Second Battle of Fredericksburg

Clarke County:

- Battle of Cool Spring
- Battle of Berryville

Fairfax County:

- Battle of Chantilly
- Battle of Dranesville
- Battle of Ox Hill

Fauquier County:

- Battle of Thoroughfare Gap

Frederick County:

- Battle of Kernstown I
- First Battle of Winchester
- Second Battle of Winchester
- Battle of Kernstown II
- Battle of Rutherford's Farm
- Third Battle of Winchester
- Battle of Belle Grove

Loudoun County:

- Battle of Ball's Bluff
- Battle of Harpers Ferry
- Battle of Aldie
- Battle of Middleburg
- Battle of Upperville
- The Fight at Waterford
- Battle of Mile Hill
- Battle of Unison
- Fight at Aldie
- Skirmish at Miskel Farm
- Action at Mount Zion Church
- Battle of Loudoun Heights
- Heaton's Crossroads

Prince William County:

- First Battle of Manassas
- Second Battle of Manassas
- Battle of Manassas Station Ops.

Spotsylvania County:

- Battle of Spotsylvania Courthouse
- Battle of Chancellorsville

Stafford County:

- Battle of Aquia Creek

Warren County:

- Battle of Front Royal
- Battle of Manassas Gap
- Battle of Guard Hill
- Battle of Cedar Creek

== See also ==
- Battles of the American Civil War in Virginia
- Northern Virginia campaign topics
- Virginia in the American Civil War
