= Fort Johnston =

Fort Johnston may refer to:

- Fort Johnston (North Carolina) on National Register of Historic Places listings in North Carolina
- Fort Johnston (Leesburg, Virginia)
- Fort Johnston (Malawi)
