= Fort Walker (Hilton Head) =

- Hilton Head Island, South Carolina, U.S.
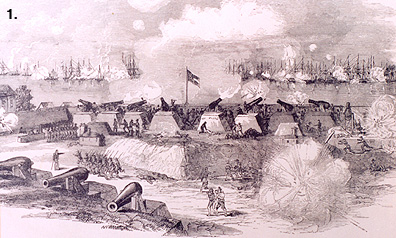
- Fort Walker during the Battle of Port Royal, 1861

Location
- Location within South Carolina
- Coordinates: 32°14′07″N 80°40′40″W

Site history
- Built: 1861
- Battles/wars: Battle of Port Royal

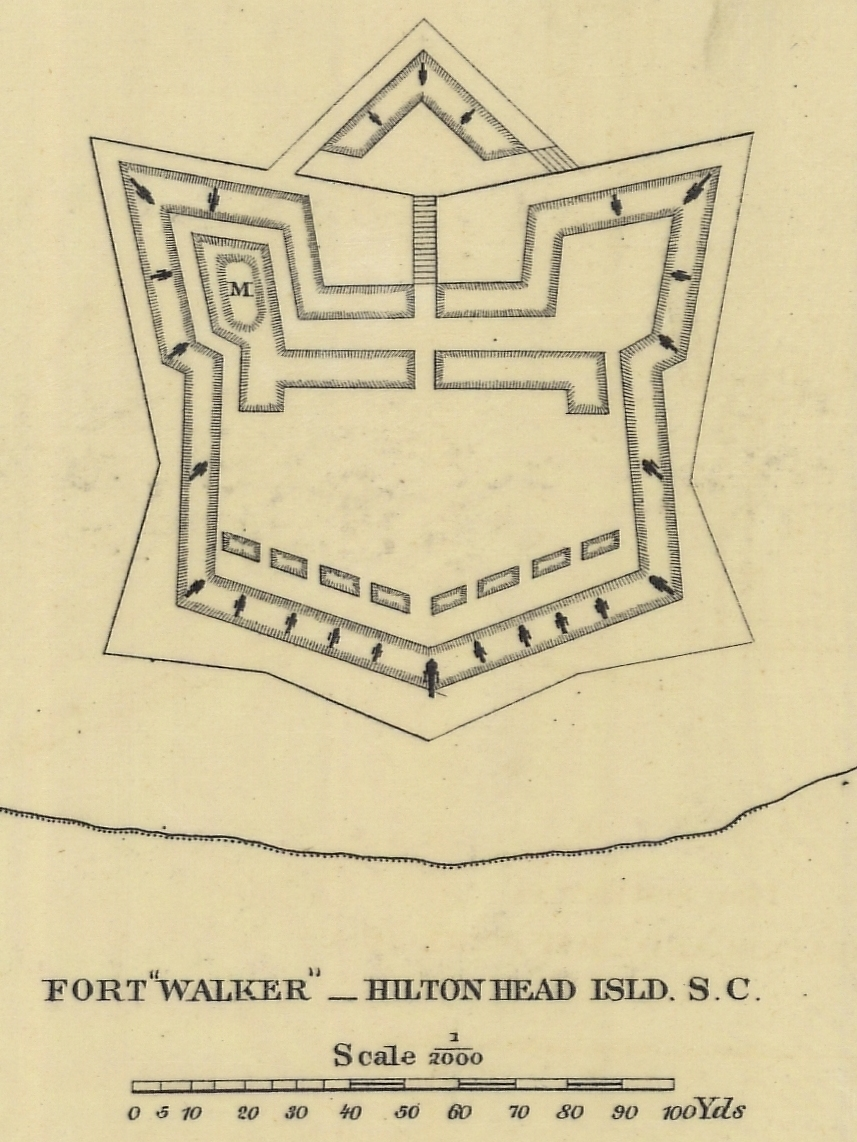
Fort Walker circa 1862

Fort Walker (Hilton Head) was an American Civil War Confederate fort located on Hilton Head Island, South Carolina at the mouth of Port Royal Sound.

== History ==
Built with slave labor during 1861, the fort was to defend against a Union blockade of one of the south's most important ports at Port Royal. Fort Walker along with the Confederate Fort Beauregard on the opposite side of Port Royal Sound was the site of the Battle of Port Royal during November 1861. After the battle the fort was renamed Fort Welles (after Secretary of the Navy Gideon Welles) by the occupying Union forces. The fort was rearmed with an experimental 15-inch dynamite gun battery 1897–1902.

== Today ==
Today the site of the fort ruins is marked with a historical marker and located on Fort Walker Drive, Hilton Head, SC. It is not accessible to the general public except through guided tours through the Coastal Discovery Museum.
