= Mosby's Raid on Herndon Station =

1863 U.S. Civil War raid in Virginia

Raid on Herndon Station
- Part of the American Civil War
Date	March 17, 1863
Location	Herndon, Virginia

Belligerents
United States (Union)	(Confederate States of America) CSA (Confederacy)

Commanders and leaders
Major William Wells, Lt. Alexander G. Watson	John S. Mosby

Units involved
1st Vermont Cavalry Regiment, Company C, Company L	Mosby's Raiders, would later become the 43rd Virginia Cavalry Battalion

Casualties and losses
Capture of Maj. William I. Wells, Capt. Robert Schofield, Lt. C.J. Cheney, and Lt. Watson and most of the regiment	

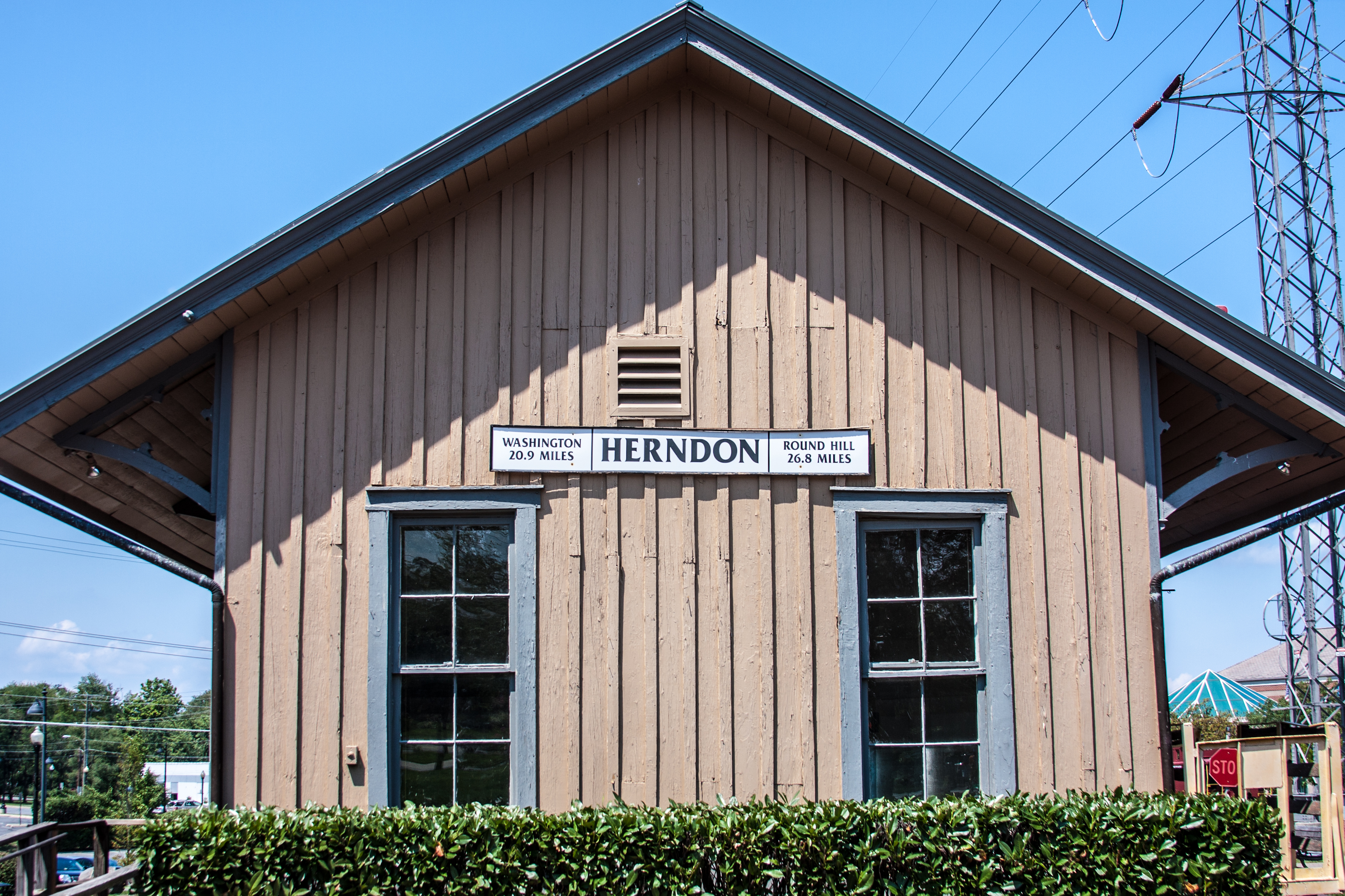
Herndon Station, Herndon Virginia

On March 17, 1863, Captain John Singleton Mosby, nicknamed "The Gray Ghost", raided a Union outpost at Herndon Station in Northern Virginia. The raid was a part of a series of such raids coordinated by Captain Mosby and his raiders in 1863 in areas of Northern Virginia. The raid on Herndon Station was the furthest north into Union lines Mosby and his men ventured. During the raid of Herndon Station 25 Union picket men were captured, and four Union men having lunch at the home of Herndon resident Kitty "Kitchen" Hanna were also found and captured by Mosby's raiders. The Town of Herndon still remembers the raid as a key event in the town's history and participation in the Civil War.

== The days leading up to the raid ==
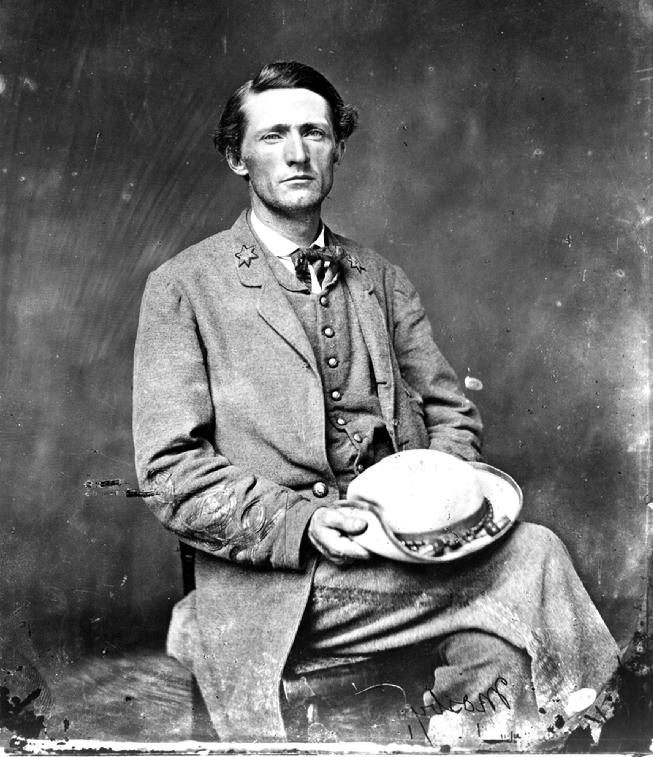
John Singleton Mosby

The raid on Herndon Station was a part of a series of raids under the command of Confederate Captain John Singleton Mosby and the 43rd Virginia Cavalry Battalion. Mosby and his men were not a traditional army unit, in that the unit was able to assemble to carry out a raid and quickly disperse afterwards. This ability gave Mosby the nickname "The Gray Ghost", with his men becoming known as "Mosby's Raiders". On March 15, 1863, two days before the raid of Herndon Station, Mosby was promoted to the position of Captain. This promotion was given shortly after Mosby's raid of the Fairfax Courthouse, only a few miles south of Herndon Station, on March 5, 1863. After his promotion Mosby and his raiders then made their way to Herndon Station on March 17, 1863.

== The Raid on Herndon Station ==
On March 17, 1863, Captain Mosby raided a Union outpost located at Herndon Station in Herndon, Virginia. Lt. Alexander G. Watson was commanding a picket of 25 soldiers who had been on duty outside of the local sawmill for the past 48 hours. Mosby and his men approached the picket and the picketers falsely believed Mosby's crew to be a relief party. Before the picket realized what was happening, Mosby's crew charged the sawmill and quickly captured many of the picket men and caused the rest to surrender with threats to burn the sawmill down. Amidst the chaos local resident Kitty "Kitchen" Hanna was preparing lunch at her husband Nathaniel "Nat" Hanna's request for four union officers: Captain Robert Schofield, Major William Wells, Lieutenant Watson, and Lieutenant Perley C. J. Cheney. Mosby's men noticed the four men's horses outside of the Hanna house and went to investigate. Seeing Mosby's men approaching Schofield and Wells ran out of the Hanna house and were quickly captured by the raiders. The other two officers, Watson and Cheney, ran up to the attic of the house to hide. Mosby's men came into the house and shot at the ceiling, calling the officers to surrender. The shots caused Major Wells to fall through the ceiling into his captor's arms. After the war Major Wells and Lieutenant Schofield returned to the Hanna house to retrieve their guns, which they had hidden in the walls that day.

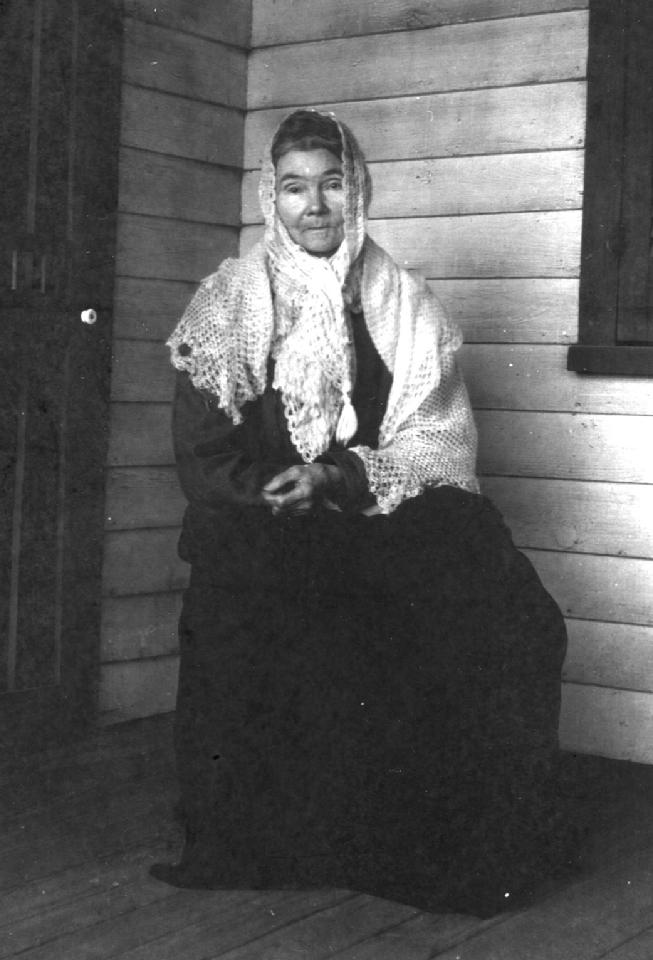
Kitty "Kitchen" Hanna

== Historic locations ==
The Hanna House – At the time of the raid, Nathaniel and Kitty Hanna were living in a small cottage located on the site which is now the location of the Main Street bank on 727 Locust Street. Prior to their small cottage home, the Hanna's lived in a small white house located at 681 Monroe Street in downtown Herndon. The house is still standing and is now the home of a hair salon. The older residents of the town still refer to the home as the Hanna House.

Herndon Station – The Herndon Station is still standing at the same location, 717 Lynn Street, as the day the raid took place in 1863. It is a monument to the town, though it no longer functions as a train station. The station is now a museum owned by the Herndon Historical Society. The museum houses railroad memorabilia, artifacts from town residents, artifacts from World War II, artifacts from the USS Herndon, and history of the US Navy commander William Lewis Herndon from whom the town got its name. The path of the train now serves as a part of the W&OD trails.

The Old Saw Mill – The Old Saw Mill no longer stands in downtown Herndon. The site where the mill used to stand is now the home of Green Lizard Cycling, a locally run coffee shop that also sells and rents out bikes.

== 150th anniversary ==
On March 17, 2013, the 150th anniversary of Mosby's raid, a reenactment was performed in Herndon's Town Square.
