= George's Schoolhouse Raid =

Coordinates: 39.250°N 77.733°W

- Part of the American Civil War
| Date | January 17, 1865 |
| Location | Loudoun County, Virginia |
| Result | Inconclusive |

Belligerents
| United States of America | Confederate States of America |

Commanders and leaders
| Thomas C. Devin | John Mobberly |

Strength
| 400 | 80 |

Casualties and losses
| 12 prisoners | unknown |

The George's Schoolhouse Raid was a Confederate partisan raid led by local guerrilla John Mobberly on the Union garrison at Lovettsville in Loudoun County, Virginia on January 17, 1865, during the American Civil War. The raid was tactically inconclusive. After surprising the sleeping garrison, the Confederates were driven away by superior force, taking with them only a few horses and prisoners. The raid is notable for being the last partisan action in Loudoun County involving Elijah V. White's 35th Virginia Cavalry Battalion.

== Background ==
At the end of 1864, the beginning of a very cold winter was setting in over northern Virginia. Colonel Elijah V. White and his 35th Battalion of Virginia Cavalry were in winter quarters with the Confederate army in the Shenandoah Valley, watching their rations dwindle. White, facing the desertion and starvation of his ranks, managed to obtain permission to take the 35th back home to Loudoun County so that he might try to obtain forage and resume partisan activities against the Federal army occupying the county. The Federals too were settling into winter quarters, though with far greater rations and prospects for the spring campaign season. Around Christmas 1864, Col. Thomas Devin's cavalry brigade from the Harpers Ferry garrison, who regularly patrolled Loudoun, made camp northwest of the Unionist village of Lovettsville in the vicinity of George's Schoolhouse, just east of the Short Hill Mountain.

Upon returning to the county on January 3, 1865, White and his men witnessed the devastation in the Loudoun Valley from Philip Sheridan's Burning Raid and the toll from Federal incursions in the county. A little more than a week later, on January 12, members of the 35th were attending a party in Hillsborough, when they were surprised by the Unionist Loudoun Rangers, leaving one dead and two captured. Colonel White became convinced not to spend the winter in the midst of the enemy without taking action. The Federals were wholly unable to disrupt communication between the partisan groups operating in the county, and White was able to bring together a raiding party of 80 or so men composed of members of the 35th, Mosby's Rangers and John Mobberly's independent command.

== The Raid ==
On the night of January 17, the raiding party, led by Mobberly, made its way up the Between the Hills valley from Hillsborough to Neersville, where they crossed the Short Hill on a footpath known only to locals such as Mobberly. Upon reaching the eastern side of the mountain, the group sneaked up on the pickets of Devin's camp and captured them before they could sound an alarm. As they approached the reserve post on the Harpers Ferry-Lovettsville Road, they did not have such fortune, and the post could not be taken without gunfire. Believing their cover blown, although it had not, the party charged the Union camp, only to discover it had recently been reinforced with an additional 200 men, bringing the total to 400. Under the cover of dark and a blanket of fresh snow, the raiding party was able to surprise and capture 150 men and horses of the recently arrived reinforcements.

Union officer Captain Bell was able to assemble his undressed men and began to advance on the raiding party with pistols and carbines drawn. Unable to withstand an assault by some 250 Union troops and hold 150 prisoners and horses, the raiding party broke off the attack, abandoning all of their prisoners except 50 horses and a dozen men. They made a quick retreat back to Woodgrove and disbanded, with the Federals unable to give meaningful chase in their unprepared condition.

== Results ==
The raid was largely unsuccessful, but it did highlight the Federals' continuing inability to effectively deal with partisans in Loudoun. For the 35th, the raid was their last in the county. At the end of the winter, they were mustered into regular service and re-absorbed into the Laurel Brigade, of which White would assume command. For Mobberly, it was his last concerted action against the Federals in the county before he was gunned down on April 15.
