= Fort Beauregard (disambiguation) =

Several forts have been named Fort Beauregard.

- Fort Beauregard, in Louisiana
- Fort Beauregard (Virginia)
- Fort of Beauregard (Besançon), France
- Fort Proctor, in Lake Borgne, Louisiana; also known as Fort Beauregard or Beauregard's Castle
- Railroad Redoubt, at the Siege of Vicksburg, was also known as Fort Beauregard
- Fort Beauregard, fort sited on Philip's Island in South Carolina that Union forces captured at the Battle of Port Royal in 1861
