= Harmony skirmish =

1865 American Civil War engagement

- Part of the American Civil War
Date	March 21, 1865
Location	Loudoun County, Virginia 39.13°N 77.66°W
Result	Inconclusive

Belligerents
United States of America	Confederate States of America

Commanders and leaders
Marcus Reno	John S. Mosby

Units involved
Loudoun Rangers; 12th Pennsylvania Cavalry; 1st United States Infantry	43rd Battalion Virginia Cavalry

Strength
1000	128

Casualties and losses
34 (9 killed, 20 wounded, 5 captured)	11 (2 killed, 5 wounded, 4 captured)
- Location of the skirmish in Virginia

The Harmony skirmish was a small engagement of the American Civil War between Confederate forces under Colonel John Mosby and Union forces under Colonel Marcus Reno on March 21, 1865, near the village of Harmony (present-day Hamilton) in Loudoun County, Virginia. A Union raiding party that was sent into Loudoun County to eliminate Confederate partisans was ambushed by Mosby's Rangers near the village of Harmony. After inflicting light casualties on the Federals, the Rangers could not drive off the numerically superior and better-equipped force and were compelled to withdraw. The skirmish, the last major action of the war within Loudoun, was tactically inconclusive.

== Background ==
On the afternoon of March 20, Col. Reno, commanding a 1000-man expedition consisting of the Loudoun Rangers, 12th Pennsylvania Cavalry, 1st United States Infantry, and 2 pieces of light artillery, set out from Harpers Ferry into Loudoun County on a mission to obtain forage and clear the Loudoun Valley of partisans. The column entered Loudoun in the Between the Hills valley and marched through Hillsboro and Woodgrove, reaching Purcellville on the morning of the 21st. The column was under near continuous sniping fire from Confederate partisans during the march, 5 of which were captured at Hillsboro.

The Federal incursion did not go unnoticed by John Mosby's scouts, and accordingly, he ordered his Rangers to rendezvous the following morning. On the 21st, Mosby, with 128 Rangers, set out north from upper Fauquier to confront the Federals.

== The skirmish ==
Around midday, Mosby reached Harmony, whereupon he learned the Federals were located 2 miles (3.2 km) west in Purcellville. Unsure of the strength of the opposing force, Mosby led his Rangers approximately 1 mile (1.6 km) southeast of the village. He deployed the main body of his force in the woods south of the road while leaving 24 Rangers under Jim Wiltshire on the road as bait for an ambush. The 12th Pennsylvania soon came upon the Wiltshire's men, and taking them to be an isolated band of partisans of the nature that the Federals had been fighting with since entering Loudoun, immediately charged. Wiltshire's force broke into retreat until they reached the woods where the rest of the Rangers were concealed, at which point they suddenly turned around and counter-attacked the Federals. At the same time, the rest of the Rangers came out of the woods and assailed the Federal flank. The 12th Pennsylvania briefly made a stand but was soon compelled to retreat.

The Rangers broke after them, but they encountered the Federal infantry concealed behind a hedgerow as they reached Harmony. The infantry met the Rangers with a fierce volley that wounded and killed several and forced most of the rest to fall back. A few daring Rangers pursued the Federals further, including James Sinclair, who, after killing one Federal, saw that he wore a diamond ring. In the midst of the fight, Sinclair jumped from his horse to pull the ring from the body, and when it would not budge, he cut the finger off. Mosby soon called off the Rangers and fell back towards Fauquier. He would continue to shadow the Federals as they ranged through Loudoun and Fauquier for the next 3 days, though no significant fighting occurred between them.

== Results ==
In the brief fight, the Rangers killed 9 Federals, wounded 20, and took 5 prisoners while suffering 2 killed, 5 wounded, and 4 captured, including Ranger John Chew, who was paralyzed by gunfire in the fight and left behind when the Rangers fell back. The fight did little to deter the Federal incursion, nor did the Rangers inflict the severe casualties that was a characteristic of most of their raids. Still, the engagement is significant in that it represents the county's last fight of any size.
