= Fort Evans =

- Leesburg, Virginia

Site information
- Controlled by: Confederate States Army

Location
- Coordinates: 39.1108°N 77.5313°W

Site history
- Built: 1861
- In use: 1861—1862
- Battles/wars: Battle of Ball's Bluff

Garrison information
- Past commanders: Nathan Evans; D.H. Hill

Fort Evans is a Civil War-era rectangular earthen fort located in Leesburg, Virginia. It was the first of three forts constructed in 1861 to protect Leesburg from possible invasion after Virginia seceded from the Union.

== History ==
The fort, designed by Captain John Morris Wampler in August 1861, was built the following month east of town on a 400 feet (120 m) knoll along Edwards Ferry Road to protect the approaches to the town from the Potomac River. During the Confederate occupation of Leesburg between 1861 and 1862, Fort Evans was the headquarters for the garrison under Brigadier Generals Nathan George Evans (after whom the fort was named) and D.H. Hill. From the fort, General Evans successfully orchestrated the defense of Leesburg during the Battle of Ball's Bluff. The fort was abandoned when the Confederates withdrew from Loudoun County to defend Richmond during the Peninsula Campaign in 1862 and briefly occupied by the Union army under John Geary during his occupation of the town that same year.

In June 1863, the fort was briefly occupied during the Gettysburg campaign by the Federal XII Corps under Major General Henry Slocum. Fort Evans guarded the approaches to Edwards Ferry, which was at the time the site of two pontoon bridges. The fort played an uneventful, but important role securing the river crossing site.

Today, the earthworks of the fort still exist off Edwards Ferry road on private property.

== Design ==
The fort is roughly trapezoidal in shape, oriented along the principal directions axis. The north wall measures 340 feet (100 m), the east wall 340 feet (100 m), the south wall 320 feet (98 m) and the west wall 305 feet (93 m). A number of gun embrasures for the placement of batteries were put on each wall, despite the relatively small amount of artillery assigned to the garrison at Leesburg

== See also ==
- Fort Johnston
- Fort Beauregard
