= 1st Vermont Cavalry Regiment =

- Active: November 19, 1861 to August 9, 1865
- Disbanded: August 9, 1865
- Allegiance: (United States) United States; Union
- Branch: United States Army; Union Army
- Type: Cavalry
- Engagements: Battle of Winchester; Battle of Gettysburg; Third Battle of Winchester; Battle of Cedar Creek

The 1st Vermont Cavalry Regiment was a three years' cavalry regiment in the Union Army during the American Civil War. It served in the Eastern Theater from November 1861 to August 1865, in the Cavalry Corps, Army of the Potomac.

== History ==
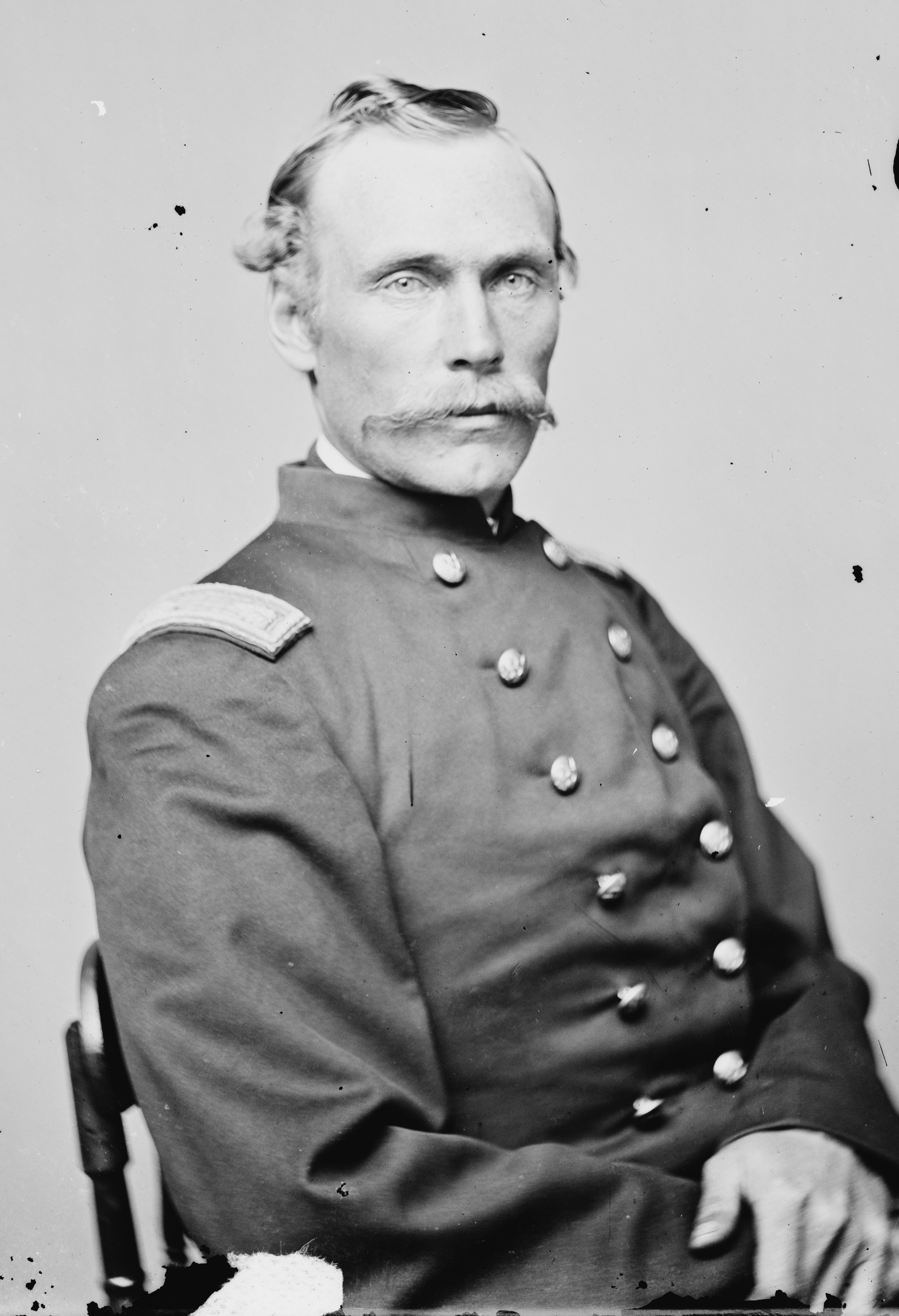
Addison W. Preston of the 1st Vermont Cavalry

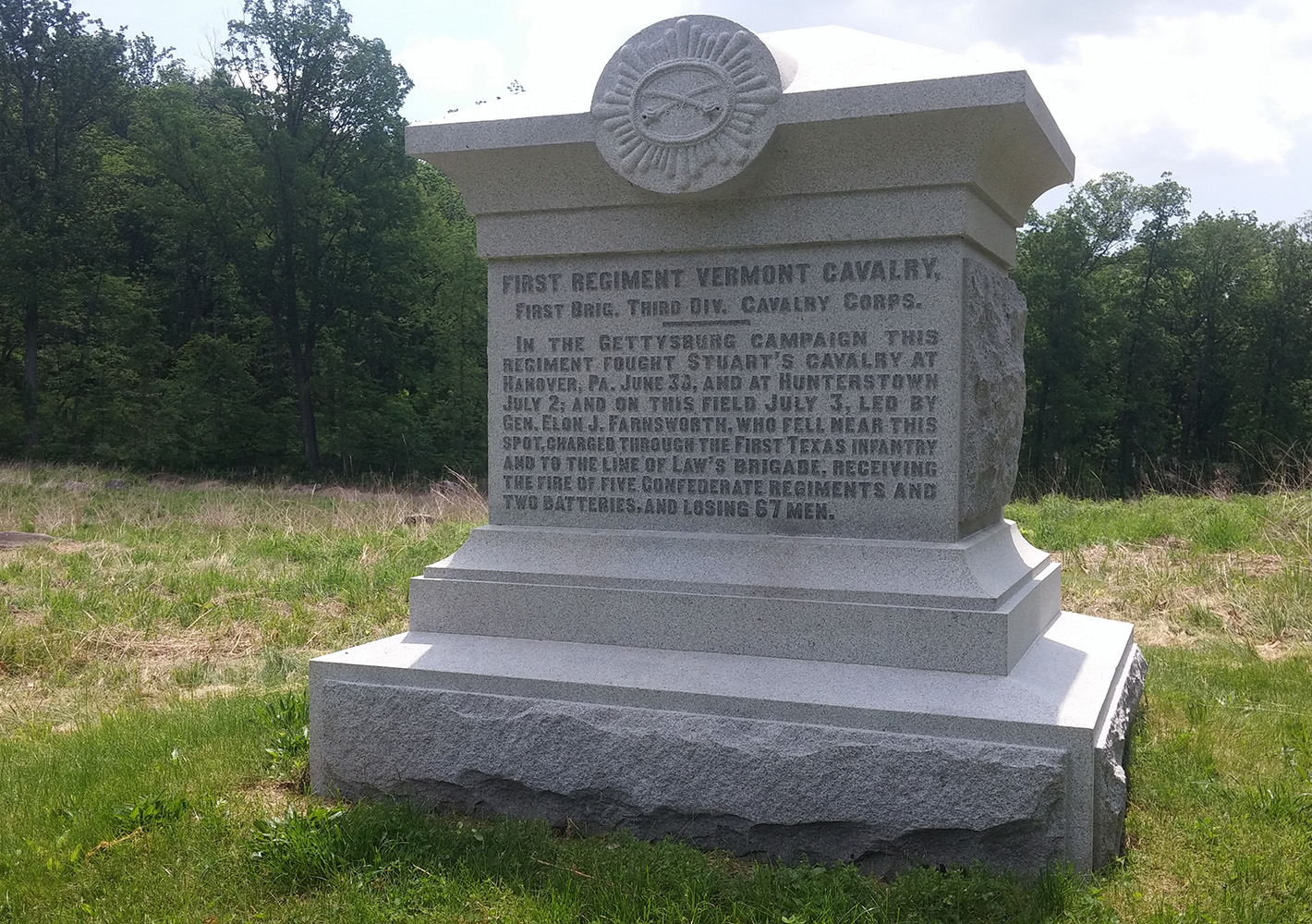
Monument to the 1st Vermont Volunteer Cavalry Regiment at Gettysburg

The regiment was mustered into Federal service on November 19, 1861, at Burlington, Vermont. Its first commander was Colonel Lemuel B. Platt, and the first lieutenant colonel was George Bradley Kellogg. Platt's appointment was an honor sometimes afforded to an individual who aided in raising and equipping a regiment; subsequent commanders included Jonas P. Holliday, Charles Henry Tompkins, Edward B. Sawyer, Addison W. Preston, William Wells, and Josiah Hall.

It was engaged in, or present at 76 engagements during the course of the war, from Mount Jackson on April 16, 1862, to Appomattox Court House, on April 9, 1865, including the 1862 and 1864 Shenandoah Valley campaigns, the Gettysburg campaign, the Overland Campaign and the Siege of Petersburg, plus many skirmishes not connected to a particular campaign, such as the Skirmish at Miskel Farm.

The regiment most notably participated in BG Elon Farnsworth's unsuccessful attack on the Confederate right flank on the third day of the Battle of Gettysburg. The 1st Vermont Cavalry's Maj William Wells led a battalion in that attack, with Farnsworth by his side. Lieut: Col Addison W. Preston commanded the regiment. The regiment's monument stands on the Slyder Field, near the site where BG Evander Law's brigade repelled the Union attack. According to Albert Drury of the 1st Vermont, "In the afternoon of the same day July 3d we charge upon the Enemy a secnd time, which proves to be a rather foolish move. We charge upoon a Brigage of Infantry fortified by stone walls on all sides. Genl Farnsworth is Killed...."

The regiment lost during service: 112 killed and mortally wounded, 159 died in Confederate prisons, 7 died from accidents and 114 died by disease; total loss 392.>

The regiment mustered out of service on August 9, 1865.

The regiment's heritage continues to be celebrated to this day with a state legislative decree naming the Corps of Cadets at Norwich University, the Military College of Vermont, as members of the regiment. Members of the NUCC wear the crossed sabers on all of their uniforms and their insignia.

== See also ==
- List of Vermont Civil War units
