= Heaton's Crossroads =

- Part of the American Civil War
Date	July 16, 1864
Location	Loudoun County, Virginia 39.1357°N 77.6919°W
Result	Inconclusive

Belligerents
United States of America	Confederate States of America

Commanders and leaders
Col. William B. Tibbits	John C. Breckinridge; Bradley T. Johnson
- Location of the battle in Virginia

Heaton's Crossroads, also known as the Purcellville Wagon Raid, was an American Civil War skirmish that took place between Federal cavalry under Brig. Gen. Alfred N. Duffié and Confederate infantry under Maj. Gen. John C. Breckinridge on July 16, 1864, near present-day Purcellville, Virginia in Loudoun County as part of the Valley Campaigns of 1864. The action was tactically inconclusive.

== Background ==
Following the Battle of Fort Stevens on July 12 in Washington D.C., Confederate Lt. Gen. Jubal A. Early decided to withdraw his army across the Potomac River into Virginia and return to the Shenandoah Valley. The Confederates withdrew along the Georgetown Pike into Montgomery County, Maryland towards Poolesville. On the July 14 they reached Conrad's Ferry (present day White's Ferry) and crossed making camp at Big Springs just north of Leesburg, Virginia.

Nearly a full day after Early set out towards Virginia, Union forces under Maj. Gen. Horatio Wright set out in pursuit. Under his command was the entire VI Corps, part of the XIX Corps as well as several divisions of "100-days" troops recruited to defend Washington. On the afternoon of July 15, Wright arrived in Poolesville and learned of the arrival of the Army of West Virginia at Harpers Ferry.

A small force of infantry and cavalry from the Army of West Virginia, under Brig. Gen. George Crook had crossed into Loudoun that morning by way of Berlin (present day Brunswick), briefly skirmished with Confederate cavalry near Waterford and retired to Hillsboro. Seeing that he could pin Early between himself and the force under Crook in the Loudoun Valley, Wright determined to cross the Potomac the following morning and ensnare Early in the Federal pincers. Wright, however, could not easily communicate with Crook as the telegraph wires between his position and Harpers Ferry had been cut by John S. Mosby's Rangers a few days prior during his raid on Point of Rocks.

== Battle ==
=== Confederate withdrawal and Union reconnaissance ===
The morning of July 16, with the Federals closing in, General Early broke camp at Leesburg and set out for the Shenandoah Valley by way of Snickers Gap which lay some 20 miles across the Loudoun Valley via the Snickers Gap and Leesburg Pike. While his main army and wagon trains used that route to withdrawal, cavalry under Brig. Gen. Bradley T. Johnson was ordered to take a more northerly route and protect the armies right flank and Brig. Gen. John McCausland was to lead cavalry, and a column of POWs and cattle captured Maryland, on a southerly route across Ashby's Gap and protect the armies left flank. The infantry of Generals Robert E. Rodes and Stephen Dodson Ramseur marched behind the wagons and Brig. Gen. John D. Imboden's cavalry served as the rearguard.

Later that morning, Wright began his crossing at Conrad's Ferry, with a small force under Maj. Gen. Edward Ord crossing at Edwards Ferry. Wright's forces briefly skirmished with Rodes and Ramseur's Cavalry, who quickly withdrew in the face of superior numbers. Though the crossing was not disputed, Wright spent the rest of the day getting his army across the river and was only at Leesburg by days end, where he briefly skirmished again with Imboden's Cavalry. While Wright was crossing the river, General Duffié dispatched several cavalry patrols from Hillsboro to locate the Confederate column. On patrol encountered Confederate Cavalry east of Purcellville and drove them back on the main body and in doing so located Early's wagon train. The patrol broke off and returned to Hillsboro to report the reconnaissance.

As the Confederates made their way across the Loudoun Valley, Johnson's cavalry stopped at Waterford to water their horses, assuming the army was in safe territory and not in imminent danger. This delay allowed the main army to advance beyond its right flank screen. Around noon, Duffié's patrols reported back to him, alerting him of the presence of the Confederate wagon train as well as of Johnson's force at Waterford. General Crook immediately dispatched the 15th New York Cavalry under Col. George Wells to Waterford to engage Johnson and the 21st New York with the 1st West Virginia Light Artillery under Col. William B. Tibbits to attack the wagon train. Wells for his part drove off the remaining Confederates at Waterford, though Johnson's main force had already left, and then stayed to receive the accolades of the unionist town's thankful citizens.

=== Crossroads ===
Tibbits, meanwhile, arrived a mile north of Heaton's Crossroads on the Berlin pike and caught sight of the Confederate column, which to his delight was without cavalry protection. Tibbits left a small force there as a decoy, telling them to wait for the artillery signal to attack and then took his main force a mile west through a woods, using a small ridge to screen himself from the Confederates. Tibbits deployed his men and artillery on the crest of the ridge and at 2 p.m. began his attack, ordering the artillery to fire and his men to charge. The shock of the attack caused the small infantry guard accompanying the wagon train to flee without a fight. The attacking Federals then caused the Confederate teamsters to stampede the Wagon trains, and Tibbits turned his charge to the east allowing him to round up the wagons fleeing his decoy force attacking along the Berlin Pike.

The attack quickly lost coherence as the force fanned out among the fleeing wagons and as troopers left to escort captured wagons back to Hillsboro. The attack, however, did not go unnoticed among the Confederate leadership. Gen. Breckenridge ordered Brig. Gen. Gabriel Wharton to deploy his infantry and artillery on a ridge west of the town along with Brig. Gen. Robert Ranson's cavalry. As the Federal attack came into sight the confederate infantry and artillery opened up and Ranson's cavalry rode around to Wharton's left cutting off the Federal escape route. The presence of strong infantry force caused the Federals to flee, but because Ranson had cut off their main route back to Hillsboro, they abandoned the captured wagons that they had not yet taken back to Hillsboro, attempting to light fire to them before the fled. In their hurry to flee, the Federals left their artillery behind. Meanwhile, Ramseur's infantry approached the Crossroads from Leesburg and encountered Tibbits decoy force, which was quickly dispatched by the cavaliers.

Upon returning to Hillsboro, Lt. William Josyln of the 21st New York determined to retrieve the abandoned artillery and received permission from Gen. Duffié to do so. Accompanied by 18 troopers, Josyln arrived at Heaton's Crossroads to discover the guns had already been taken away by the Confederates. They also encountered a small detachment of Confederate partisans, either from Mosby's Rangers or John Mobberly's gang, dressed in Federal uniforms, who they took to be friendly soldiers. After gaining the confidence of the troopers the Rangers killed the 18 enlisted men and took Josyln prisoner.

=== Woodgrove ===
As the day drew to a close, the last of Early's force except Johnson, who went into camp at Woodgrove southwest of Hillsboro and now acting as a rearguard, crossed the Blue Ridge and Shenandoah River and made camp around Berryville. The two Union commands, now in communication with each other set out to rendezvous at Heaton's Crossroads. As the Crook set out from Hillsboro he ordered Duffié to take his cavalry on a westerly route to serve as a screen against a possible Confederate attack. The route Duffié selected took the Federals right through Woodgrove. At 9 p.m., in the twilight after sunset, Duffié's cavalry entered Woodgrove, catching Johnson's cavalry completely by surprise, due to poor picket posting. Most of the Confederates fled immediately, many leaving their horses behind, except the 8th Virginia Cavalry, who formed a line, with half of the company dismounted as skirmishers and attacked Duffié's Cavalry, enabling their comrades to make an escape. The fight was fierce but short and by the time Duffié brought up his artillery all of the Confederates including the 8th had fled, regrouping at present day Round Hill.

== Aftermath ==
The Federal cavalry was successful in capturing 37 wagons, burning 43 and capturing 54 prisoners at the expense of several artillery pieces and at least 18 casualties. Because the two Federal armies could not effectively communicate they were unable to hinder Early's withdrawal and missed the best opportunity they had to date to do so. The Confederates, for their part, gained little from the day besides their passage across the Blue Ridge and a few pieces of artillery which was counterbalanced by Johnson being twice embarrassed, once at Waterford and again at Woodgrove.
