= Fort Johnston (Leesburg, Virginia) =

Coordinates: 39.1293°N 77.5847°W

Fort Johnston, also known as Fort Geary, is a Civil War era earthen fort atop a 670 feet (200 m) peak of Catoctin Mountain just west of Leesburg, Virginia. Constructed in the winter of 1861-62 following the Battle of Ball's Bluff, it is one of three forts constructed to defend the town from the threat of possible invasion. The fort was built in the design of a four-point star with arm of each point measuring roughly 110 feet (34 m) in length. The fort was only sporadically occupied by Confederates, as the main threat of invasion came from the east across the Potomac. In 1862, when Loudoun County was invaded by the Union army, the fort was abandoned and later occupied by the Federals who rechristened it Fort Geary in honor of their commander. Throughout the war, Leesburg was rarely held in force by either side of the conflict and the fort saw little use. Today, parts of the earthworks of the fort still exist, and are located on private property on Fort Johnston Road.

== See also ==
- Fort Evans
- Fort Beauregard
