= Fight at Aldie =

Battle of the American Civil War

- Part of the American Civil War
Date	March 2, 1863
Location	Aldie, Loudoun County, Virginia 38.98°N 77.64°W
Result	Confederate victory

Belligerents
United States of America	Confederate States of America

Commanders and leaders
Franklin T. Huntoon	John S. Mosby

Units involved
1st Vermont Cavalry	Mosby's Rangers

Strength
50	17-28

Casualties and losses
19 (captured)	1 (wounded)
- Location of the fight in Virginia

The Fight at Aldie was a small cavalry skirmish between Confederate forces under Major John S. Mosby and Union forces under Major Joseph Gilmore and Captain Franklin T. Huntoon in Aldie, Virginia, on March 2, 1863, as part of Mosby's Operations in Northern Virginia during the American Civil War. The fight which resulted in a Confederate victory was significant in that it was the first action of Mosby's Rangers within their operating territory in the central Loudoun Valley. In the fight Mosby and his men displayed many characteristics that would become their hallmark including the attack on numerically superior force while inflicting disproportionate casualties to those received.

== Background ==
On January 24, 1863, Maj. Gen. J.E.B. Stuart dispatched his scout John S. Mosby and 15 of his cavaliers to the lower Loudoun Valley in Fauquier County to conduct operations against Union forces occupying Northern Virginia. On January 28, the small band met at Mount Zion church, 0.5 miles (0.80 km) east of Aldie and set on their first raid against Federals in Chantilly. During the next month, Mosby and his men raided into Fairfax County twice more, besting larger Federal forces each time. On March 2, in response to the raids, Colonel Sir Percy Wyndham dispatched 200 troopers of the 18th Pennsylvania under Major Joseph Gilmore from Fairfax towards Middleburg to find and capture Mosby and his men. In the town, the Union force, many of whom were reportedly drunk, began searching local residences and arresting citizens in an attempt to smoke out Mosby's men. When this proved to be unsuccessful, Gilmore threatened to burn the town. Residents of the village, pleaded with Gilmore to spare them, claiming to have no knowledge of the whereabouts of Mosby's men. Gilmore apparently believed them and withdrew with his command east, toward Aldie. At Aldie, the 18th Pennsylvania encountered a 50-man detachment of the 1st Vermont on similar patrol in Loudoun. The drunken Major Gilmore mistook the 1st Vermont for Confederates and ordered a retreat. The 1st Vermont, overtook the 18th Pennsylvania and the mistake was recognized. The 18th Pennsylvania informed the 1st Vermont of their failure to locate Mosby and then withdrew for Fairfax, while the 1st Vermont returned to Aldie to water their mounts.

== The fight ==
The Federal raid on Middleburg did not go unnoticed by Mosby. As soon as the Federals left the town, he quickly assembled as many men as possible, totaling between 17 and 28, and then set out towards Aldie in pursuit. As Mosby's men entered the village from the west, they spied the dismounted 1st Vermont. Mosby immediately ordered a charge and with a yell the Confederates bore down on the Federals, taking them by surprise and sending most of them into a wild retreat. In the midst of the charge, Mosby lost control of his horse and was forced to jump off, losing it to the Federals. During the fight Captain John W. Woodward of the 1st Vermont had his horse shot out from underneath him, pinning him to the ground. One of Mosby's men ran towards him to shoot him, but Woodward was able to draw a concealed pistol and shoot his assailant. Believing that Woodward had already surrendered when he fired the shot a few of Mosby's men rushed in to execute him, but Mosby, who witnessed the affair, quickly interceded, taking the captain prisoner.

== Aftermath ==
Despite losing his horse, Mosby and his men handled themselves well, capturing 19 Federals, including two captains and 23 horses, while suffering only one wounded. In response to the raid into his territory, Mosby planned another raid on Federals in Fairfax to capture the cavalry commander Sir Percy Wyndham on March 9. The result of this action would be Mosby's most famous exploit of the war, the Stoughton Raid. In addition, for defending the town of Middleburg and severely embarrassing the Federals sent to raid it, Mosby and his men won the admiration of the town's citizens, who had to this point been weary of the partisans. The support of the people of the Loudoun Valley would become one of Mosby's greatest assets for the duration of the war.
