= Fort Beauregard (Virginia) =

Civil War-era rectangular earthen fort

Coordinates: 39.0953°N 77.5502°W

Fort Beauregard was a Civil War-era rectangular earthen fort located on a 430 feet (130 m) promontory above Tuscarora Creek just southeast of Leesburg, Virginia. Built in the winter of 1861–1862 following the Battle of Ball's Bluff, it was one of three forts built by Confederates to defend Leesburg against possible invasion. Fort Beauregard commanded the southern eastern approaches to the town, including the Old Carolina Road and the Alexandria and Winchester Turnpike (present day Virginia State Route 7). The fort may have been only partially constructed, and was never occupied by Confederates in force before Leesburg was evacuated in the spring of 1862. The fort was occupied by Union forces for a brief period in the summer of 1862. The fort was subsequently destroyed, and the exact location remains unknown. The likely site currently sits in the privately owned "Beauregard Estates" neighborhood.

== See also ==
- Fort Johnston
- Fort Evans
