= Skirmish at Miskel Farm =

Battle of the American Civil War

- Part of the American Civil War
Date	April 1, 1863
Location	Loudoun County, Virginia 39.07°N 77.44°W
Result	Confederate victory

Belligerents
United States of America	Confederate States of America

Commanders and leaders
Henry C. Flint †	John S. Mosby

Units involved
1st Vermont Cavalry Regiment	43rd Battalion Virginia Cavalry

Strength
150	70

Casualties and losses
106 (9 killed, 15 wounded, 82 captured)	4 (1 killed 3 wounded)
- Location of the skirmish in Virginia

The Skirmish at Miskel Farm, also known as the Fight at Miskel Farm or Gunfight at Miskel Farm, was a skirmish during the American Civil War. It took place April 1, 1863, near Broad Run in Loudoun County, Virginia, between Mosby's Rangers and the 1st Vermont Cavalry as part of Mosby's operations in Northern Virginia. The 2nd Pennsylvania surprised and attacked the Rangers, who were bivouacked on the farm of Thomas Miskel. The Rangers successfully defended the attack and subsequently routed the 2nd Pennsylvania, inflicting heavy casualties and taking many prisoners.

== Background ==
On the afternoon of March 31, Mosby and about 70 of his Rangers set out from Rectortown in Fauquier County towards Fairfax County through snow and rain. Their destination was Dranesville near the Loudoun–Fairfax border. They planned on attacking the Union garrison stationed there, which was often sent into Loudoun and Fauquier to raid Mosby's Confederacy. Unfortunately for the Rangers, they were foiled by their own success.

Upon arriving in Dranesville, they found the garrison abandoned, having been pulled back east of Difficult Run in the face of mounting pressure from the partisan warfare being waged by Mosby. With night fast approaching, the Rangers set out back west into Loudoun, eventually stopping at the farm of Thomas and Lydia Miskel at about 10:00 p.m. to get forage for their mounts and to rest for the night. At the farm, located on the eastern bank of the Broad Run near its confluence with the Potomac River, a few miles north of the Leesburg Pike (present day Route 7), the Rangers felt safe from Federal patrols. Most of the Rangers tied their mounts in the barnyard and made their beds in the barn, which was surrounded by a high fence with only a single gate opening out to the lane running to the road to Leesburg pike. The lane, in turn, was bounded on both sides by two fences. Mosby and his officers took refuge in the main house.

The presence of Mosby and his Rangers was a conspicuous sight to the locals, who knew all too well what the Federals might do to them if they were found aiding and abetting the Rangers. Thus, a local woman, hoping, perhaps to spare herself such a calamity or maybe just an outright Union sympathizer, made her way to the Federal lines at Union Church, arriving around midnight. She reported Mosby's presence to Major Charles F. Taggart of the 2nd Pennsylvania Cavalry. Upon learning the news, Taggart immediately dispatched Captain Henry C. Flint and five companies of the 1st Vermont Cavalry to kill or capture the Rangers.

== Battle ==
By early dawn, the Federals had reached Broad Run on the Leesburg Pike, and stopped briefly at a house off the Road to inquire as to the whereabouts of the Miskel Farm. After receiving the information, they set out towards Miskel Farm and Mosby's unsuspecting men. As fate would have it, Ranger Dick Moran had been in the house the Federals stopped at visiting friends. As soon as the Federals left, he mounted his horse and took off across the fields to warn Mosby and his fellow Rangers.

As Captain Flint approached the Miskel Farm, he divided his command, assigning Captain George H. Bean command of a small 50-man reserve force while he maintained command of the vanguard. Bean was detailed with the duty of barricading the barnyard gate after Flint and his men went through and then circling around behind the barn to cut off all routes of escape for the Rangers. Just as Flint prepared to attack, Dick Moran came rushing by and burst into the barnyard yelling for his comrades to mount up and prepare to give fight. The Rangers rushed to their mounts, and Mosby burst from the main house as the Federals charged into the barnyard. Though armed with carbines, Flint opted for the romance of a cavalry charge and ordered his man to unsheathe their sabers.

As the Federals fell upon the Rangers, they were met with a sharp volley of pistol fire from the partially mounted Confederates. Flint was killed instantly, struck by six bullets, and fell from his horse. At this point, the Federal attack broke down and the men began to panic as they struggled to break through the locked gate. Among the first to make it through the gate was Bean, who, after Flint fell, was supposed to be in command. Mosby seized the initiative and led a counterattack with the 20 or so Rangers that had been able to mount up. The Rangers were on top of the Federals, who were trapped in the barnyard lane, almost instantly, causing the vast majority to surrender. Those who managed to escape were pursued for several miles by the victorious Rangers.

== Aftermath ==
When the smoke cleared, Mosby had suffered one killed and three wounded. The Rangers killed 9, including Flint and another officer, wounded 15, including three officers and captured 82. In addition, 95 horses were seized by the Rangers.

The fight resulted in a crushing defeat for the Federals; they had the Rangers bottled up in a barnyard with only one exit, on a farm surrounded on two sides by water and outnumbered them by more than 2 to 1. By all accounts, the Rangers should have been wiped out that morning, but Flint made several mistakes. The most glaring was his insistence on leading a saber charge against the Rangers, who made notorious use of drawn pistols in their fights. The Vermonters were armed with carbines, which the Rangers could not match. If Flint had dismounted and attacked with those weapons the Federals could have easily overpowered the trapped Rangers, and in all likelihood Flint would have survived the fight rather than running head on into the Rangers' deadly volley.

Flint's second mistake was dividing his unit and placing Bean in second command. What knowledge Flint had of Bean's leadership qualities is unknown, but even after Flint had been killed, the Federals still had the Rangers surrounded and outnumbered, a competent officer could still have rallied the unit and pressed the attack. Instead Bean lead the retreat. For his incompetence and cowardice Bean was subsequently drummed from the service. The fight taught the young commander Mosby and his troops many valuable lessons; never again would he put himself in such a vulnerable position, nor leave himself camped without the protection of pickets.
