= Action at Mount Zion Church =

Action of the American Civil War

- Part of the American Civil War
Date	July 6, 1864
Location	Loudoun County, Virginia 38°57′49.67″N 77°36′35.06″W
Result	Confederate victory

Belligerents
Confederate States	United States

Commanders and leaders
John S. Mosby	William H. Forbes

Units involved
43rd Battalion Virginia Cavalry	2nd Massachusetts Cavalry; 13th New York Cavalry

Strength
150	150

Casualties and losses
6 (1 killed, 5 wounded)	106 (12 killed, 37 wounded, 57 captured)
- Location of Mount Zion Church in Virginia

The action at Mount Zion Church was a cavalry skirmish during the American Civil War that took place on July 6, 1864. The skirmish was fought between Union forces under Major William H. Forbes and Confederate forces under Colonel John S. Mosby near Aldie in Loudoun County, Virginia as part of Mosby's Operations in Northern Virginia. After successfully raiding the Union garrison at Point of Rocks, Maryland, Mosby's Rangers routed Forbes's command, which had been sent into Loudoun County to engage and capture the Rangers. The fight resulted in a Confederate victory.

== Background ==
On July 2, Col. John S. Mosby was informed of Lt. Gen. Jubal A. Early's plans to invade Maryland by the latter's quartermaster, Hugh Swartz, who was then traveling through Fauquier County. In order to aid Early's raid, Mosby planned a raid into Maryland of his own to cut telegraph wires between Washington, D.C., and Harpers Ferry. Accordingly, he ordered a rendezvous of the Rangers the following morning at Rectortown to which 250 Rangers responded. The Rangers spent the day in the saddle making it to Purcellville by days end where they made camp for the night. The next morning, July 4, the Rangers traveled the rest of the distance to the Potomac River, arriving across from Berlin (present day Brunswick) around 11 a.m., whereupon scouts were dispatched along the river to find possible targets of attack. When they returned, Mosby was informed of a small Union force at Point of Rocks, Maryland. Mosby determined this would be the Rangers target and they set out east down the Potomac to that village.

That same day, 100 troopers of the 2nd Massachusetts Cavalry and 50 from the 13th New York Cavalry under Maj. William H. Forbes were dispatched from Falls Church into Loudoun County by Col. Charles Russell Lowell to hunt down Mosby and his Rangers. The force traveled west down the Little River Turnpike (present day U.S. Route 50) to Lenah and then headed north up the Carolina Road toward Leesburg, stopping at Ball's Mill on the Goose Creek for the night. The following day, the Federals traveled to Aldie and then to Leesburg before returning to Ball's Mill.

=== The 2nd Calico Raid ===
Upon arriving across the river from Point of Rocks, the Rangers found the village held by two companies of Federal infantry and two companies of cavalry in the form of the Loudoun Rangers, totaling 350 Federals in all. One of the companies of infantry inhabited Patton's Island in the middle of the Potomac, while the second occupied a small fort on high ground C&O Canal. The Loudoun Rangers were encamped in the village. Mosby immediately set to work clearing Patton's Island in preparation for crossing the river. He deployed Ranger Sam Chapman with his lone howitzer on the bluff above the river bank and ordered a detachment of sharpshooters under Lt. Albert Wrenn to wade into the river and attack the Federal position on the island. The Federal infantry exchanged fire with the Rangers for several minutes before giving way to the combined rifle and artillery fire and fled to the Maryland shore, tearing up the small bridge over the canal as they crossed it. The Rangers then dashed across the river to the Maryland shore where they began exchanging fire with the Federals across the canal. Many of the Rangers immediately set about repairing the bridge using planking from an old building. As soon as it was complete the Rangers ran across, led by Henry Hatcher who ran into the Union camp under heavy fire and captured its flag. Once across the canal the Rangers quickly drove the Federals from the town.

With the Union garrison dispatched, the Rangers set about burning canal boats and cutting the telegraph wires that ran beside the river from Washington to its garrison at Harpers Ferry. Besides Point of Rocks strategic value, it was also the refuge of many prominent Loudoun Unionists and their property, including the Loudoun Rangers' commander, Samuel C. Means. Thus after effecting the disruption of travel and communication along the Potomac the Rangers set about pilfering the stores and warehouses of the town, some of which contained property of Loudoun unionists. Because of the numerous pieces of fine clothing the Rangers returned with, the raid became known as the "Calico Raid". After completing the raid the Rangers retired back to Virginia and camped along the road to Leesburg.

The following morning, Mosby dispatched about 100 Rangers to escort the three wagons full of plunder back to Fauquier. He also dispatched Rangers Fount Bettie and Harry Heaton to report to Early, who was camped near Antietam Creek, with the message that Mosby's command would coordinate with his. Mosby then led his Rangers back to Point of Rocks to continue his raid into Maryland. The actions of the Rangers, however had not gone unnoticed in Washington and after learning of the raid, Maj. Gen. Henry Halleck dispatched the 8th Illinois Cavalry from Washington to Point of Rocks. When the Rangers arrived at the banks of the Potomac they found the 8th Illinois holding the village. A 90-minute firefight across the river ensued, in which the 8th Illinois claimed to kill one and wound two rangers while suffering no casualties themselves (Mosby made no record of any casualties), before Mosby broke off the attack and headed south towards Leesburg. The 8th Illinois were soon dispatched from Point of Rocks to Monocacy Junction, where Union Maj. Gen. Lew Wallace was assembling a rag-tag force to oppose Early's drive on Washington, and along with the Loudoun Rangers, would fight in the Battle of Frederick and the Battle of Monocacy.

== The battle ==
As Mosby approached Leesburg, his scouts reported to him the presence of the Federals under Forbes in the town. In response, Mosby led the Rangers into camp west of Leesburg on Catoctin Mountain where the Rangers spent the night. The Federals departed from Leesburg the next morning, July 6, and headed south by Oatlands Mill and on to Aldie. At around 6 p.m. the Federals arrived at the intersection with the Little River Turnpike and stopped to rest for an hour or so at the Skinner farm near Mount Zion Church. Meanwhile, Mosby entered Leesburg shortly after the Federals left and learned of their withdrawal. He led the Rangers out of town towards Ball's Mill on the Carolina Road, believing that the Federals had returned on the same route they had arrived on. At Ball's Mill Mosby was informed by local citizens of his mistake, whereupon he devised a plan to head southeasterly towards Gum Springs (present day Arcola) and intercept the Federals as they traveled east on the Little River Turnpike.

Upon arriving at Gum Springs, Mosby deployed his scouts who located the Federal force a half mile away on the western slope of a small ridge that lay between the two forces. Mosby deployed his howitzer on the crest of the ridge and formed his command on the Turnpike in columns of four led by Lt. Harry Hatcher with dozen skirmishers in advance. The skirmishers encountered Forbes' pickets just as the Federals were preparing to leave. Alerted by his pickets, Forbes quickly assembled his men into two lines in a field south of the pike and prepared to charges the oncoming Rangers. The shots of the skirmishers also alerted Ranger Sam Chapman manning the howitzer who let out a shot, which though not well aimed, caused disruption in the Federal line. Seeing that he could no longer order a charge, Forbes attempted to redeploy his lines to meet a charge. The disruption gave the Rangers time to dismantle a rail fence that stood between them and the Federals. Upon its removal the Rangers charged, delivering a deadly volley at the reforming Federal lines and startling the Federals' horses, sending their ranks into disarray.

The Federals broke southwest past the Skinner house and Mount Zion Church. For his part, Forbes attempted to rally his men, getting them to reform a line in the woods southwest of the pike. In the woods the two forces collided in fierce close range fighting. The Federals drew their sabers but found them ineffective against the Rangers pistol fire. In the close quarter fighting, Forbes encountered Mosby and attempted to stab him with his saber. Ranger Thomas Richards jumped in front of the blade, taking it in the shoulder and saving his commander. Mosby emptied his pistol, shooting out Forbes' horse from under him throwing him to the ground. Forbes quickly surrendered and the Federal resistance finally gave way. The Federals broke pell-mell into retreat with the Rangers in pursuit for several miles.

== Aftermath ==
The hour-long fight proved to be one of the Rangers' most complete victories. They inflicted severe casualties, killing 13, including Captain Goodwin Stone, wounding 37, taking 57 prisoners, including Forbes, and capturing every horse not injured or killed in the fight, totaling 71% of the Federal force in all. The Rangers suffered 1 killed and 6 wounded. In addition, the telegraph wires that were cut at Point of Rocks during the Calico Raid would hinder the Federal pursuit of Early following the Battle of Fort Stevens.
