= 43rd Virginia Cavalry Battalion =

Military unit in the Confederate army

- The flag of Virginia during the American Civil War
- Active: June 10, 1863 – April 21, 1865
- Country: Confederate States
- Allegiance: Confederate Army
- Type: Cavalry
- Role: Partisans
- Size: Nine companies
- Nicknames: "Mosby's Rangers"; "Mosby's Raiders"; "Mosby's Men"
- Equipment: .44 Colt army revolvers, (briefly) one mountain howitzer
- Engagements: American Civil War: Battle of Loudoun Heights; Skirmish at Miskel Farm; Action at Mount Zion Church

Commanders
- Notable commanders: John S. Mosby

Insignia
- Stars and Bars

The 43rd Virginia Cavalry Battalion, also known as 43rd Virginia Rangers, Mosby's Rangers, Mosby's Raiders, or Mosby's Men, was a battalion of partisan cavalry in the Confederate Army during the American Civil War. Noted for their lightning strike raids on Union targets and their ability to consistently elude pursuit, the Rangers disrupted Union communications and supply lines.

The 43rd Battalion was formed on June 10, 1863 at Rector's Cross Roads, near Rectortown, Virginia, when John S. Mosby formed Company A of the battalion. He was acting under the authority of General Robert E. Lee, who had granted him permission to raise a company in January 1863 under the Partisan Ranger Act of 1862 in which the Confederate Congress authorized the formation of such units. By the summer of 1864, Mosby's battalion had grown to six cavalry companies and one artillery company, comprising about 400 men. After February 1864, the Confederate Congress revoked the authority of all partisan units, except for two, one of which was the 43rd Battalion, the other being McNeill's Rangers. The battalion never formally surrendered, but was disbanded on April 21, 1865, after Lee surrendered the Army of Northern Virginia at Appomattox Court House to Ulysses S. Grant but not before it had attempted to negotiate surrender with Major General Winfield S. Hancock in Millwood, Virginia.

== Etymology ==
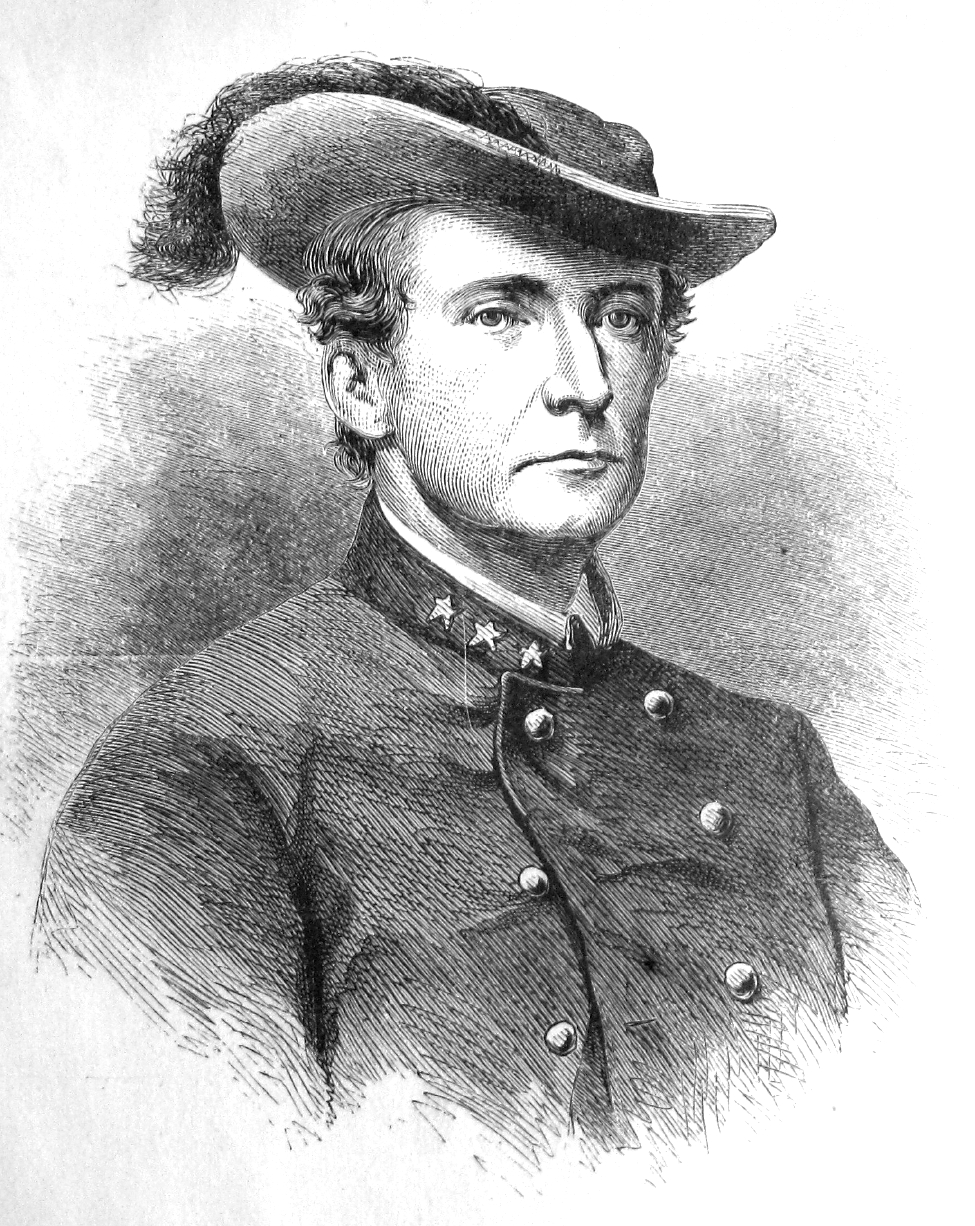
Col. John S. Mosby, wood engraving 1867

What to call the Confederate 43rd Battalion was a matter of contention during the war. The members of the battalion were referred to as soldiers, partisans, rangers, and guerillas.

The Union viewed them as unsoldierly: a loose band of roving thieves. Northern newspapers and Unionists referred to them as guerrillas, a term of opprobrium at the time. One of Mosby's men, Munson, stated in memoirs published after the war that "the term [guerrilla] was not applied to us in the South in any general way until after the war, when we had made the name glorious, and in time we became as indifferent to it as the whole South to the word Rebel."

Mosby himself avoided overtly militaristic words like "troops" or "soldiers" or "battalion" in favor of the more familial "Mosby's Men" or "Mosby's command".

== History ==
=== Unit organization and muster ===
- Company A - Organized June 10, 1863, at Rector's Cross Roads, Rectortown, Virginia
- Company B - Organized October 1, 1863, at Scuffleburg, Virginia, just south of Paris
- Company C - Organized December 7, 1863, at Rectortown, Virginia
- Company D - Organized March 28, 1864, at Paris, Virginia
- Artillery Company - Organized July 4, 1864, at Paris, Virginia
- Company E - Organized July 18, 1864, at Upperville, Virginia
- Company F - Organized September 13, 1864, at Piedmont Station near Delaplane, Virginia
- Company G - A reorganization of the Artillery Company, November 28, 1864, at Salem in Fauquier County, Virginia
- Company H - Organized April 5, 1865, in Loudoun County, Virginia

=== Operating area, purpose, and recruiting ===
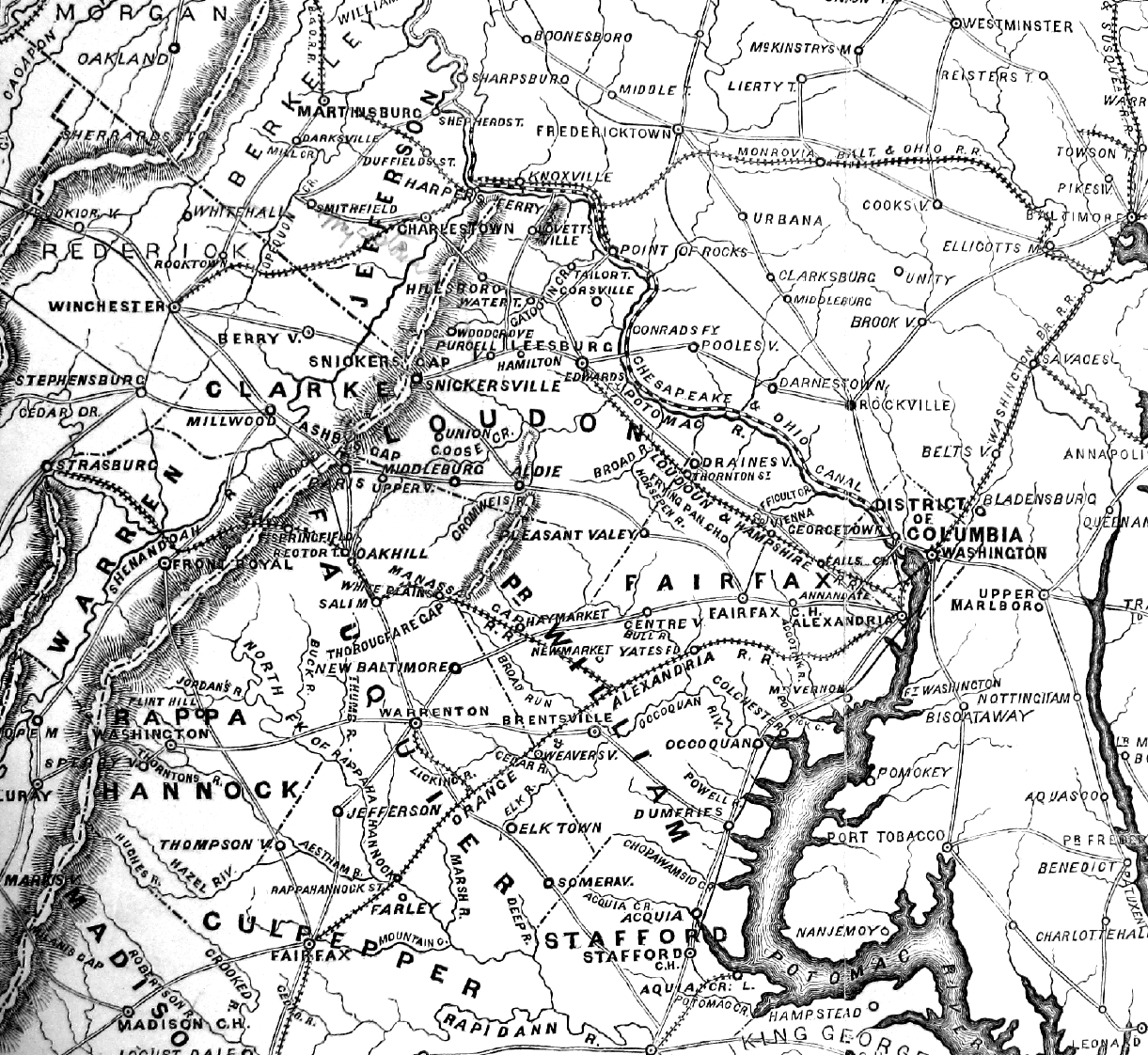
Map depicting Mosby's Confederacy and nearby areas printed in 1867, showing contemporary place names.

The method of operation involved executing small raids with up to 150 men (but usually 20 to 80) behind Union lines by entering the objective area undetected, quickly executing their mission, and then rapidly withdrawing, dispersing the troops among local Southern sympathizers, and melting into the countryside.

Mosby's area of operations was Northern Virginia from the Shenandoah Valley to the west, along the Potomac River to Alexandria to the east, bounded on the south by the Rappahannock River, with most of his operations centered in or near Fauquier and Loudoun counties, in an area known as "Mosby's Confederacy". Mosby's command operated mainly within the distance a horse could travel in a day's hard riding, approximately 25 miles (40 km) in any direction from Middleburg, Virginia. They also performed raids in Maryland.

Of his purpose in raiding behind the Union lines, Mosby said:

My purpose was to weaken the armies invading Virginia, by harassing their rear... to destroy supply trains, to break up the means of conveying intelligence, and thus isolating an army from its base, as well as its different corps from each other, to confuse their plans by capturing their dispatches, are the objects of partisan war. It is just as legitimate to fight an enemy in the rear as in the front. The only difference is in the danger ...

— Col. John S. Mosby, CSA

Mosby felt that "a small force moving with celerity and threatening many points on a line can neutralize a hundred times its own number. The line must be stronger at every point than the attacking force, else it is broken."

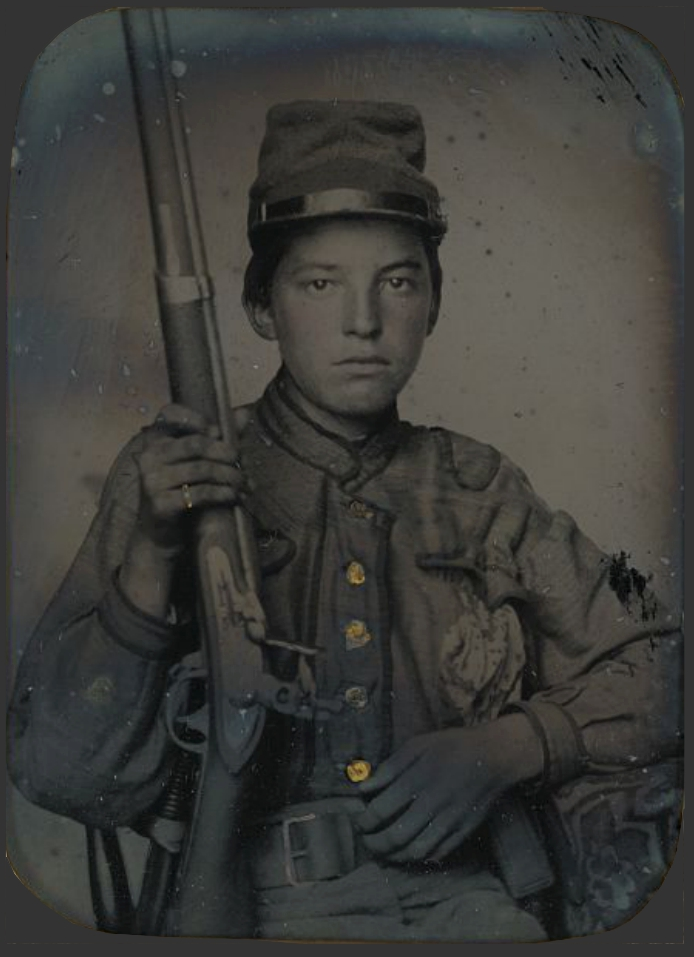
Sergeant William T. Biedler, 16 years old, of Company C, Mosby's Virginia Cavalry Regiment with flintlock musket. From the Library of Congress Prints and Photographs Division.

The unit also utilized child soldiers. According to the memoirs of former partisan Munson, Mosby welcomed volunteers attracted by the glory of the fight and the allure of booty, and had an eye for intelligence, valor, resourcefulness, but "what Mosby liked best was youth. He agreed with Napoleon, that boys make the best soldiers . . . mere boys, unmarried and hence without fear or anxiety for wives or children." A few partisans were wizened old men in their 40s, but most were in their late teens or early 20s; two paroled after the war at Winchester were only 14 years old. An adolescent boy released from school for the day in Upperville just as Mosby's men were chasing Union troopers out of town "became so excited that he mounted a pony and joined in the chase with no weapon except his textbook. This would be the last day of study for Henry Cable Maddux . . . but the first of many raids with Mosby's men."

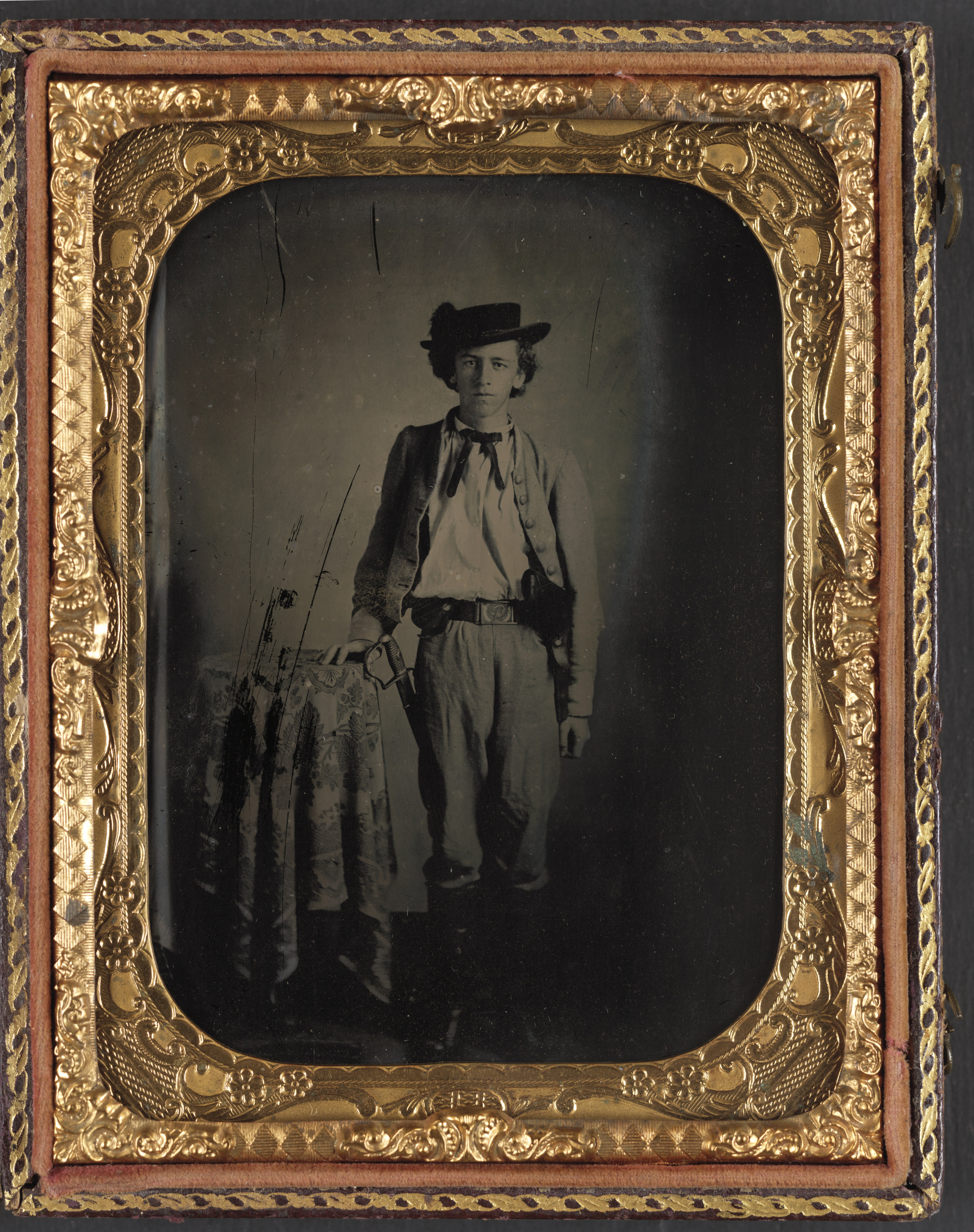
Private Lucien Love of Co. D, 43rd Virginia Cavalry Battalion

=== Uniforms, weapons, and tactics ===
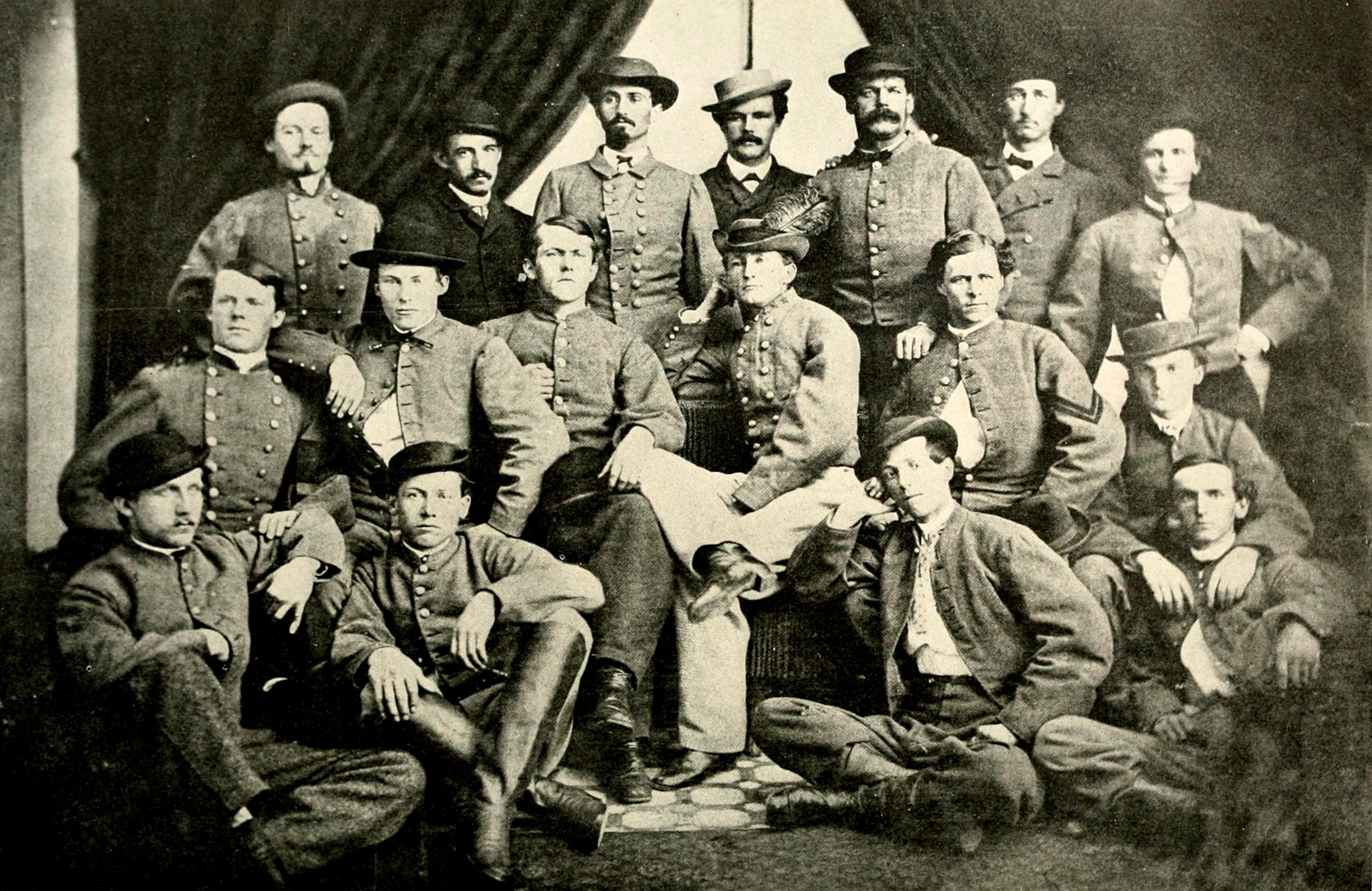
Confederate Cavalry Colonel John S. Mosby and some of his men. Top row (left to right): H. Lee Howison, W. Ben Palmer, John W. Puryear, Tom Booker, Alexander G. Babcock, Norman V. Randolph, Frank Rahm. Second row: Robert B. Parrot, Thomas Throop, John W. Munson, John S. Mosby, Rat Noel, Charles H. Quarles. Third row: Walter W. Gosden, Henry T. Sinnott, Otho L. Butler, Issac A. Gentry

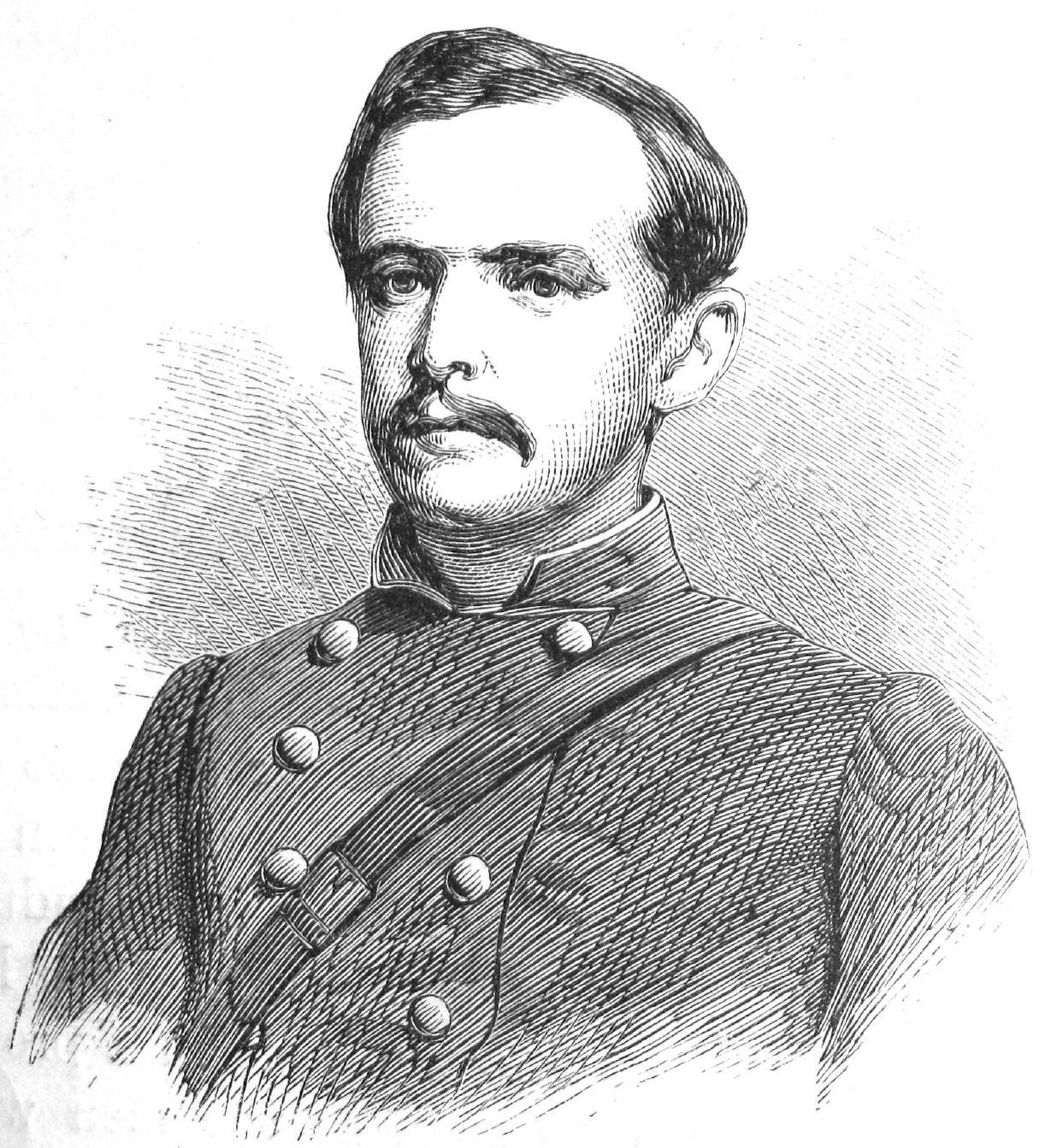
Captain Montjoy, wood engraving 1867

The 43rd Battalion were partisans who melted into the civilian population when not on a raid, and at one point General Grant ordered several captured partisans hanged for being out of uniform. Nonetheless when raiding they did wear Confederate gray at least in some fashion. Munson said in his memoirs:

"Something gray" was the one requisite of our dress and the cost of it mattered little. Much of it was paid for by Uncle Sam out of the money we got from him directly and indirectly. . . . It has been said that we wore blue to deceive the enemy, but this is ridiculous, for we were always in the enemy's country where a Southern soldier caught dressed in a blue uniform would have been treated to a swift court-martial and shot as a spy. I never knew, nor did I ever hear, of any man in our Command wearing a blue uniform under any circumstances . . . We had no reason to use a blue uniform as a disguise, for there was no occasion to do so. Many of our attacks were made at night, when all colors looked alike, and in daytime we did not have to deceive the Yankees in order to get at them.

Munson's denial of the use of Union blue is contradicted by another source. The diary of Union mapmaker Private Robert Knox Sneden, who Mosby captured near Brandy Station, Virginia at 3:00am November 27, 1863, records that Mosby's raiders were disguised in Union Blue overcoats, and so was Mosby himself. While interrogating Sneden, Mosby "opened his blue cavalry overcoat, showing a Rebel uniform underneath."

Mosby's men each carried two .44 Colt army revolvers worn in belt holsters, and some carried an extra pair stuck in their boot tops. Mosby and his men had a "poor opinion" of cavalry sabres, and did not use them. Munson "never actually saw blood drawn with a sabre but twice in our war, though I saw them flash by the thousand at Brandy Station." Union cavalry initially armed with the traditional sabre fought at a considerable disadvantage:

The Federal cavalry generally fought with sabres; at any rate they carried them, and Mosby used to say they were as useless against a skillfully handled revolver as the wooden swords of harlequins. As the Mosby tactics became better known, scouting parties from the Northern army began to develop an affection for the pistol, with increasing success I might add. In stubborn fights I have seen the men on both sides sit on their restless horses and re-load their pistols under a galling fire. This was not a custom, however; someone generally ran to cover after the revolvers were emptied. We both did this a good many times but, I believe, without bragging at the expense of truth, that we saw the back seams of the enemy's jackets oftener than they saw ours. . . Revolvers in the hands of Mosby's men were as effective in surprise engagements as a whole line of light ordnance in the hands of the enemy. This was largely because Mosby admonished his men never to fire a shot until the eyes of the other fellow were visible. It was no uncommon thing for one of our men to gallop by a tree at full tilt, and put three bullets in its trunk in succession. This sort of shooting left the enemy with a good many empty saddles after an engagement.

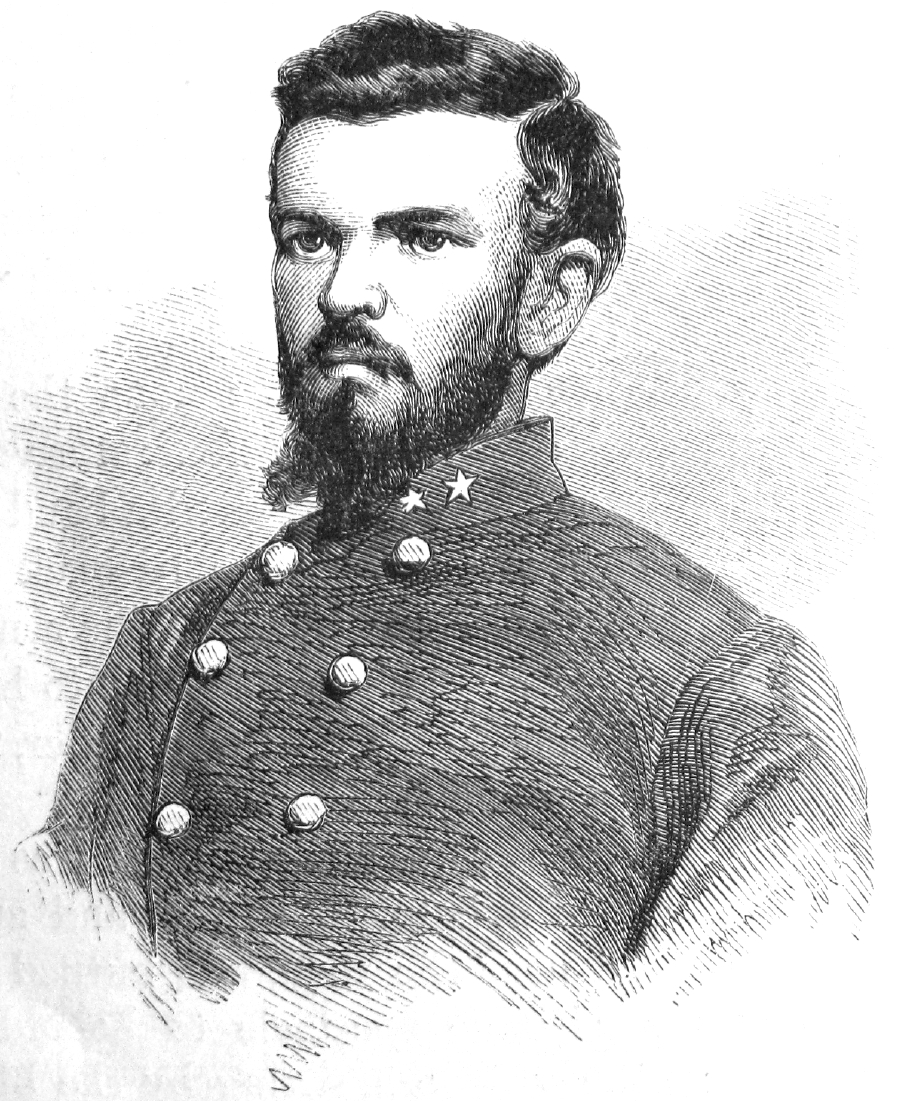
Lt. Col. William Chapman, who with six shots emptied five Yankee saddles, wood engraving 1867

For instance, describing the fight at Miskel's barn, Munson says of William H. Chapman (later lieutenant colonel of Mosby's command) wheeling his horse in a thicket of Yankees "[t]he pistols were not a foot apart. The Yankee's pistol snapped [misfired] but Chapman's did its deadly work. He fired six shots and emptied five saddles."

A few guerrillas equipped themselves with carbines captured from the Union, but "they were unhandy things to carry" and unsuited for fighting on horseback; indeed in the thick of a February 1865 fight the carbines' long barrels made them too unwieldy to fire, and they were used instead as clubs. Mosby tried out some small field artillery pieces, including a 12-pound (5.4 kg) brass Napoleon, but artillery proved to be too cumbersome for his fast hit-and-run tactics and not especially helpful in action. Ultimately Union troops found the mountainside hiding places of the cannons and made off with them.

"The rangers had some of the best horses in a region known for raising great horses." All men had at least two; Mosby himself as many as six, since a few miles at a flat-out run would exhaust even the best horse—and Mosby's men were constantly either running toward or away from the federals. The men were devoted to their horses. During the Mount Zion Church fight on July 6, 1864, guerrilla John Alexander "noticed in one of the charges that his mount was unaccountable dull, and in spite of the most vigorous spurring ... fell into the wake of the pursuit." After the action he rode his horse some distance toward Fairfax, slid exhausted out of the saddle and fell asleep in a field, and on the following morning:

. . . awoke [and] saw my horse standing at my feet with his head bending over me. His breast and forelegs were covered with clotted blood which had flowed from an ugly bullet wound. How long he had stood there in mute appeal for sympathy and relief, I do not know--perhaps all night. But as I recalled how cruelly I had spurred him to the chase the evening before, how without a groan of protest he responded the best he could, and how patiently he had stood with me, all unconscious of his suffering, on that lonely, miserable watch, I was not ashamed to throw my arms around his neck and weep out of my grief and contrition. . . . That was [our] final ride together.

Speed, surprise and shock were the true secret of the success of Mosby's command. A small, intrepid mounted force could charge a much larger one, and with the terrorizing advantage of surprise, rout them. If attacked themselves, the guerrillas would sometimes ride away a brief distance and then round on their attackers and charge back into them, panicking and scattering them in the melee. Or they would simply "skedaddle", that is scatter to the four winds, and individually make their way back to the farms in Loudoun and Fauquier counties where they were welcomed, hidden, and succoured. Mosby would then send word telling chosen men when and where to assemble for the next raid.

=== 43rd Battalion unit history ===
==== 1863 ====
- The Chantilly Raids - January 5–6, 1863
- The Chantilly Church Raid - January 26, 1863
- The Herndon Raid - February 2, 1863
- The Thompson's Corner Raid - February 26, 1863
- The Fight at Aldie - March 2, 1863
- The Fairfax Court House Raid - March 8–9, 1863
- The Raid on Herndon Station - March 17, 1863
- The Miskell's Farm Fight - April 1, 1863
- The Warrenton Junction Raid - May 3, 1863
- The First Catlett Station Raid - May 19, 1863
- The Second Catlett Station Raid - May 30, 1863
- The Raid on Seneca Mills - June 11, 1863
- The First Calico Raid - June 19, 1863
- The Raid on Mercersburg - June 28, 1863
- The Fight at Gooding's Tavern - August 24, 1863
- The Cavalry Camp Raids - September/October, 1863
- The Wagon Raids - October/November, 1863

==== 1864 ====
- The Battle of Loudoun Heights - January 1864
- The B&O Raid on Duffield Station - January, 1864
- The Fight at Blackleys Grove - February 20, 1864
- The Battle of 2nd Dranesville - February 21, 1864
- The Second Calico Raid - July 3, 1864
- The Action at Mount Zion Church - July 6, 1864
- The Berryville Wagon Raid - August 13, 1864
- The Raid on Merritt's Cavalry Division - September, 1864
- The Manassas Gap Railroad Raid - Oct 3–7, 1864
- The Greenback Raid - October 14, 1864
- The Skirmish at Adamstown - October 14, 1864
- The Valley Pike Raid - October 25, 1864
- The Rout of Blazer's Command - November 17, 1864

The total tally for the 43rd Battalion by October 1864 was 1,600 horses and mules, 230 beef cattle, 85 wagons and ambulances, and 1,200 captured, killed or wounded, including Union Brig. Gen. Edwin H. Stoughton, who was captured in bed.

==== 1865 ====
- The B&O Raid on Duffield Station II - January, 1865
- The Fight at Mount Carmel Church - February 19, 1865
- The Skirmish at Munson's Hill - March 12, 1865
- The Harmony Skirmish - March 21, 1865
- The B&O Derailment Raid - March, 1865

On April 9, 1865, General Robert E. Lee surrendered the 43rd Battalion's parent command, the Army of Northern Virginia. Immediately Colonel Mosby attempted negotiations with the Union commander in Winchester, Virginia, to arrange for the surrender of the 43rd Battalion, but could not come to terms. Instead of surrendering, Mosby's command simply disbanded.

On April 21, twelve days after Lee's surrender, Mosby gathered his battalion at Salem in Fauquier County, Virginia, and read this farewell address to his men:

Soldiers: I have summoned you together for the last time. The vision we have cherished for a free and independent country has vanished and that country is now the spoil of a conqueror. I disband your organization in preference to surrendering it to our enemies. I am no longer your commander. After an association of more than two eventful years I part from you with a just pride in the fame of your achievements and grateful recollections of your generous kindness to myself. And now at this moment of bidding you a final adieu accept the assurance of my unchanging confidence and regard. Farewell.

— Col. John S. Mosby, CSA, Commander, 43rd Battalion Virginia Cavalry

With no formal surrender, however, Union Major General Winfield S. Hancock offered a reward of $2,000 for Mosby's capture, later raised to $5,000. On June 17, Mosby surrendered to Major General John Gregg in Lynchburg, Virginia.

=== Reputation ===
Virginian newspapers were eager to carry articles about Mosby's Rangers. When other correspondents were captured in the Rangers' raids, they were treated well and given liquor and cigars. Mosby often played up his exploits to gain attention in the press for his unit and to emphasize the fact that the 43rd Battalion was a legitimate military command within the command structure of the Confederate States of America's army.

The indomitable and irrepressible Mosby is again in the saddle carrying destruction and consternation in his path. One day in Richmond wounded and eliciting the sympathy of every one capable of appreciating the daring deeds of the boldest and most successful partisan leader the war has produced—three days afterwards surprising and scattering a Yankee force at Salem as if they were frightened sheep fleeing before a hungry wolf—and then before the great mass of the people are made aware of the particulars of this dashing achievement, he has swooped around and cut the Baltimore and Ohio road—the great artery of communication between East and West, capturing a mail train and contents, and constituting himself, by virtue of the strength of his own right arm, and the keen blade it wields, a receiver of army funds for the United States. If he goes on as he has commenced since the slight bleeding the Yankees gave him, who can say that in time we will not be able to stop Mr. Trenholm's machine, and pay our army off in greenbacks. If he has not yet won a Brigadier's wreath upon his collar, the people have placed upon his brow one far more enduring.

— Richmond Whig, October 18, 1864

== Legacy ==
=== The military effectiveness of Mosby's command ===
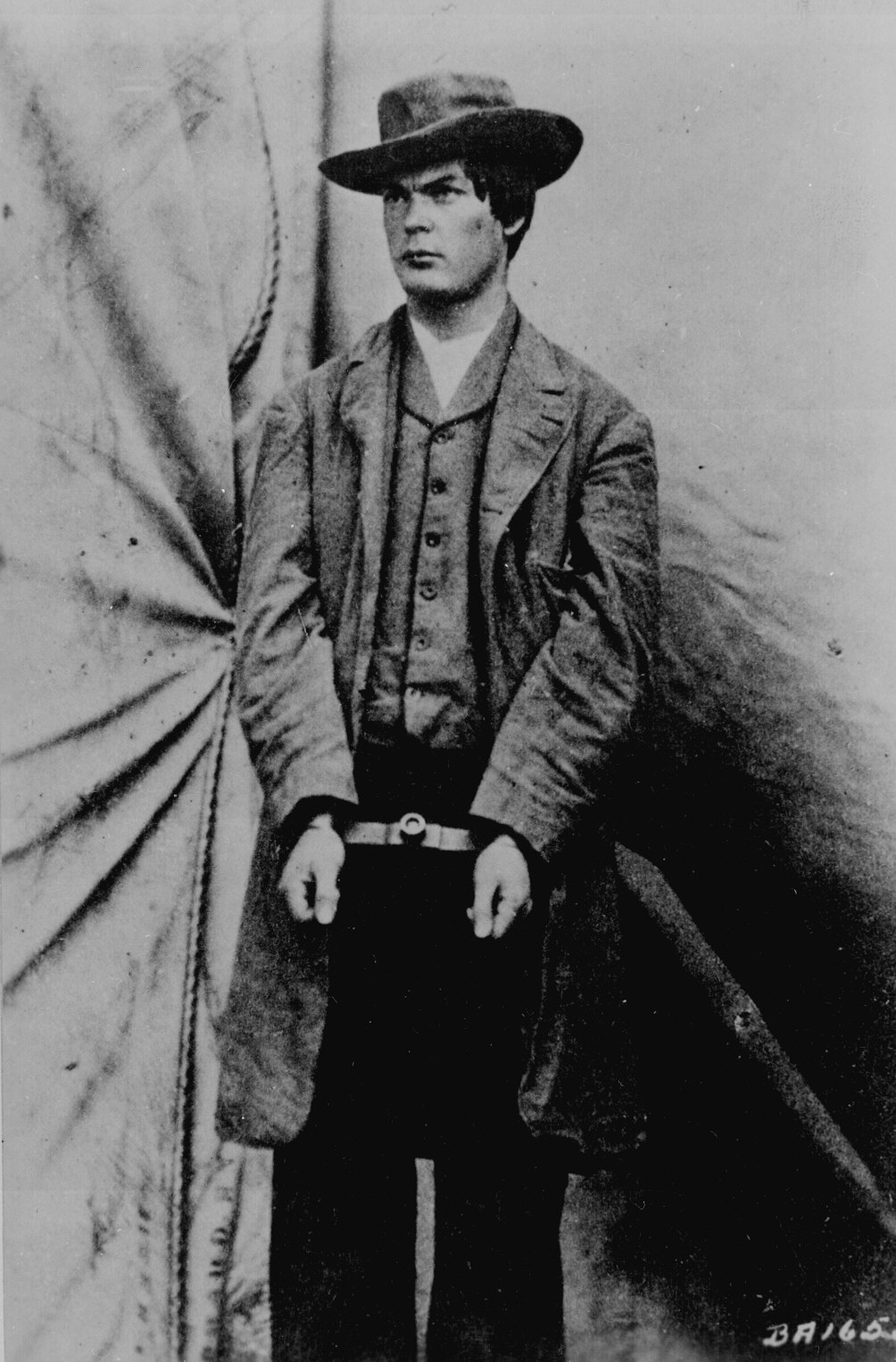
Mosby partisan Lewis Powell modeling for photographer Alexander Gardner the hat and overcoat he wore when he attacked William Seward in April 1865

It is difficult to evaluate the contribution of Mosby's raids to the overall Confederate war effort. In his memoirs, John Munson stated that if the objective was simply "to annoy the enemy," they succeeded. In discussing as Mosby's "greatest piece of annoyance", the Greenback Raid in which Mosby's men derailed a train and captured a $170,000 payroll from the paymasters of Philip Sheridan's army (each of the 80 raiders received a $2100 share, though Mosby himself took nothing), Munson says that due to Mosby's comparatively tiny force:

... [i]t was necessary for the Federal troops to guard every wagon train, railroad bridge and camp with enough active and efficient men to prevent Mosby from using his three hundred raiders in one of his destructive rushes at any hour of the day or night. . . General Grant at one point reported that seventeen thousand of his men were engaged in keeping Mosby from attacking his weak points, and thus away from active service on the firing line. Finally it was not safe to send despatches by a courier unless a regiment was sent along to guard him.

On the other hand, Mosby's guerrilla operations were not highly regarded even within the Confederate Army. Brigadier General Thomas Rosser (with the support of Generals Jubal Early and Fitz Lee) urged disbanding Mosby's command in a letter addressed to General Robert E. Lee. Rosser agreed with the Union that Mosby's men were not soldiers but glorified thieves—and bad for morale, because his regular troops were jealous:

[Mosby's men] are a nuisance and an evil to the service. Without discipline, order or organization, they roam . . . over the country, a band of thieves, stealing, pillaging, plundering and doing every manner of mischief and crime. They are a terror to the citizens and an injury to the cause [because]

First. It keeps a man out of the service whose bayonet or saber should be counted on the field of battle when the very life or death of our country is the issue.
Second. They cause great dissatisfaction in the ranks from the fact that these irregular troops are allowed so much latitude, so many privileges. They sleep in houses and turn out in the cold only when it is announced by their chief that they are to go upon a plundering expedition.
Third. It . . . encourages desertion . . . they see these men living at their ease and enjoying the comforts of home, allowed to possess all that they capture . . . . Patriotism fails in a long and tedious war like this to sustain the ponderous burdens which bear heavily and cruelly upon the heart and soul of man. . . .

General Lee sent the letter on to the Confederate War Department with an endorsement recommending "the law authorizing these partisan corps be abolished." But the War Department simply reduced the authorized partisan commands to two, Mosby's and John H. McNeill's. On later reflection, Lee concluded that whatever the military utility of the rangers in the larger scheme of things, Mosby was "zealous bold, and skillful, and with very small resources he has accomplished a great deal."

== See also ==
- List of Virginia Civil War units
- List of West Virginia Civil War Confederate units
- McNeill's Rangers

== Bibliography ==
- Evans, Thomas J. and Moyer, James M., Mosby's Confederacy: A Guide to the Roads and Sites of Colonel John Singleton Mosby. Shippensburg, PA: White Mane Publishing Co., 1991.
- Jones, Virgil Carrington., Ranger Mosby. Chapel Hill, NC: University of North Carolina Press, 1944.
- Keen, Hugh C. and Mewborn, Horace., 43rd Battalion Virginia Cavalry Mosby's Command. Lynchburg, VA: H. E. Howard, Inc., 1993.
- Mosby, John S., Mosby's Memoirs. J. S. Sanders & Co., 1995. ISBN 978-1-879941-27-4
- Munson, John W., Reminiscences of a Mosby Guerilla. Zenger Publishing Co., 1906.
- Ramage, James A., Gray Ghost: The Life of Colonel John Singleton Mosby. University Press of Kentucky, 1999.
- Scott, John, Partisan Life with Col. John S. Mosby. Harper & Brothers, 1867.
- Williamson, James J., Mosby's Rangers: A Record of the Operations of the Forty-Third Battalion Virginia Cavalry from Its Organization to the Surrender. New York: Ralph B. Kenyon, 1896.
