= List of mountains in Virginia =

This is a list of mountains in the U.S. state of Virginia.

== By mountain range ==
This list is arranged by mountain ranges.

=== Ridge-and-Valley Appalachians ===
- Allegheny Mountain
- Bear Garden Mountain
- Big Schloss Mountain
- Clinch Mountain
- Church Mountain
- Fort Lewis Mountain
- Great North Mountain
- Hankey Mountain
- Narrow Back Mountain
- Little North Mountain
- Little Schloss Mountain
- Little Sluice Mountain
- North Mountain
- Paddy Mountain
- Salt Pond Mountain
- Shenandoah Mountain
  - Elliott Knob
  - Reddish Knob
- Tea Mountain
- Threemile Mountain
- Timber Ridge

==== Cumberland Mountains ====
- High Knob
- Pine Mountain
- Powell Mountain

=== Blue Ridge Mountains ===
This list of peaks of the Blue Ridge in Virginia is listed starting from north to south.

- Blue Mountain
  - Loudoun Heights
  - Purcell Knob
  - Mount Weather
  - Paris Mountain
- Brushy Mountain
- Lost Mountain
- Naked Mountain – Elevation 1,470 ft (450 m) 38.9191°N 77.9834°W
- High Knob
- Little Cobbler Mountain (North Cobbler Mountain) – Elevation 1,447 ft (441 m) 38.8680°N 77.9448°W
- Big Cobbler Mountain (South Cobbler Mountain) – Elevation 1,562 ft (476 m) 38.8387°N 77.9528°W
- Rattlesnake Mountain – Elevation 2,113 ft (644 m) 38.8648°N 78.0436°W
- Dickey Hill
- Carson's Mountain
- Compton's Peak
- Lick Mountain
- Buck Mountain
- North Marshall Mountain
- South Marshall Mountain
- The Peak
- Hogback Mountain
- Sugarloaf Mountain
- Jenkins Mountain
- Battle Mountain
- Knob Mountain
- Pignut Mountain
- Pass Mountain
- Neighbor Mountain
- Mary's Rock
- Stoney Man
- Old Rag Mountain
- Hawksbill Mountain
- Hazeltop
- Lewis Mountain
- Maintop Mountain
- The Priest
- Apple Orchard Mountain
- Rocky Mountain
- Peaks of Otter
- Thaxton Mountain
- Mill Mountain
- Twelve O'clock Knob
- Roanoke Mountain
- Poor Mountain
- trent or trout mountain TBD
- Whitetop Mountain
- Mount Rogers
- Holston Mountain
- Turkeycock Mountain

==== Short Hill Mountain ====
- Signal Mountain

==== Ragged Mountains ====
- Fan Mountain
- Mount Jefferson
- Walton's Mountain

=== Southwest Mountains ===
- Brush Mountain
- Cameron Mountain
- Carter's Mountain
- Chicken Mountain
- Clark's Mountain
- Cowherd Mountain
- Dowell Mountain
- Gibson Mountain
- Goodloe Mountain
- Greene Mountain
- Hightop Mountain
- Jerdone Mountain
- Lonesome Mountain
- Merry Mountain
- Peters Mountain
- Roundtop Mountain
- Scott Mountain
- Sugarloaf Mountain
- Walnut Mountain
- Wolfpit Mountain

=== Broken Hills ===
- Wildcat Mountain – Elevation 1,368 ft (417 m) 38.7924°N 77.8388°W
- Rappahanock Mountain
- Pignut Mountain
- Prickly Pear Mountain
- Viewtree Mountain
- Swains Mountain
- Thumb Run Mountain
- Waters Mountain
- Piney Mountain

=== Bull Run Mountains ===
- Signal Mountain
- High Acre Ridge
- High Point Mountain
- Bisquit Mountain
- Pound Mountain

=== Catoctin Mountain ===
- Furnace Mountain
- Bald Mountain
- Carter Ridge
- Hogback Mountain
- Steptoe Hill

=== Massanutten Mountain ===
- Massanutten Mountain
- Green Mountain
- Three Top Mountain
- Powell Mountain
- Little Crease Mountain
- Short Mountain
- Mertins Rock
- Bowman Mountain
- Kerns Mountain
- Catback Mountain
- Waterfall Mountain
- First Mountain
- Second Mountain
- Third Mountain
- Fourth Mountain

=== Piedmont Monadnocks ===
- Cedar Mountain
- Thoroughfare Mountain
- Mount Pony
- Piney Mountain
- Willis Mountain
- Spears-Pruett's Mountains
- Long Mountain
- Johnson Mountain
- Smith Mountain
- White Oak Mountain

== See also ==
- List of mountains of the Appalachians
- List of mountains of the United States
- List of gaps of Virginia
