= Catoctin =

Catoctin (/kəˈtɒktən/ kə-TOK-tən) is a name of Algonquian origin that refers to a number of geographical designations in the Mid-Atlantic United States.

- Catoctin Mountain, part of the Blue Ridge Mountains in Maryland and Virginia
  - Catoctin Mountain Park, a park administered by the National Park Service in Maryland
  - Catoctin Quaker Camp, a summer camp on Catoctin Mountain
  - Catoctin Trail, a hiking trail in Maryland
- Catoctin AVA, an American Viticultural Area in Maryland
- Catoctin County, Virginia, a proposed county in Virginia
- Catoctin Creek (Maryland), a stream in Maryland
- Catoctin Creek (Virginia), a stream in Virginia
- Catoctin Furnace, a historic iron forge
- Catoctin Creek Distilling Company, a distillery in Purcellville, Loudoun County, Virginia
- Catoctin District, an election district in Loudoun County, Virginia
- Catoctin High School, a public high school located at the foot of Catoctin Mountain in Thurmont, Maryland
- USS Catoctin (AGC-5), a ship in the United States Navy
- Hi-Catoctin, original name of Camp David
