= Jeremy's Run =

Stream in Page County, Virginia, U.S.

Coordinates: 38°46′7.42″N 78°23′30.02″W

Jeremy's Run is a stream in Page County, Virginia.

Jeremy's Run originates from rainwater flowing down the west slope of Elkwallow Gap in the Blue Ridge Mountains. Elkwallow Gap is a topographical saddle that divides Neighbor Mountain and Hogback Mountain, situated in Shenandoah National Park. Jeremy's Run flows southwest from the gap, to the Great Appalachian Valley.

== Watercourse ==
From Elkwallow Gap, the stream flows southward and later westward through a hollow that separates the northern arm of Neighbor Mountain from Knob Mountain. A hiking trail known as Jeremy's Run Trail crosses the stream 14 times in the national park. Jeremy's Run then takes a northwest course, and passes under Virginia Route 340. It tributes the south fork of the Shenandoah River west of the highway.

== Drainage ==
Jeremy's Run drains into the Shenandoah River, which in turn is part of the Potomac River watershed, which drains into the Chesapeake Bay.

== Fishing ==
There are many long pools in the lower section of the stream that are home to brook trout.

== Route 340 Jeremy's Run Bridge ==
A replacement bridge over Jeremy's Run on Route 340 was scheduled to be completed November 12, 2009. The projected cost is $7,674.952.55, and the work is being completed by General Excavation Inc. of Warrenton, Va.

== See also ==
- List of rivers of Virginia
