= Gambrill State Park =

State park in Maryland, United States

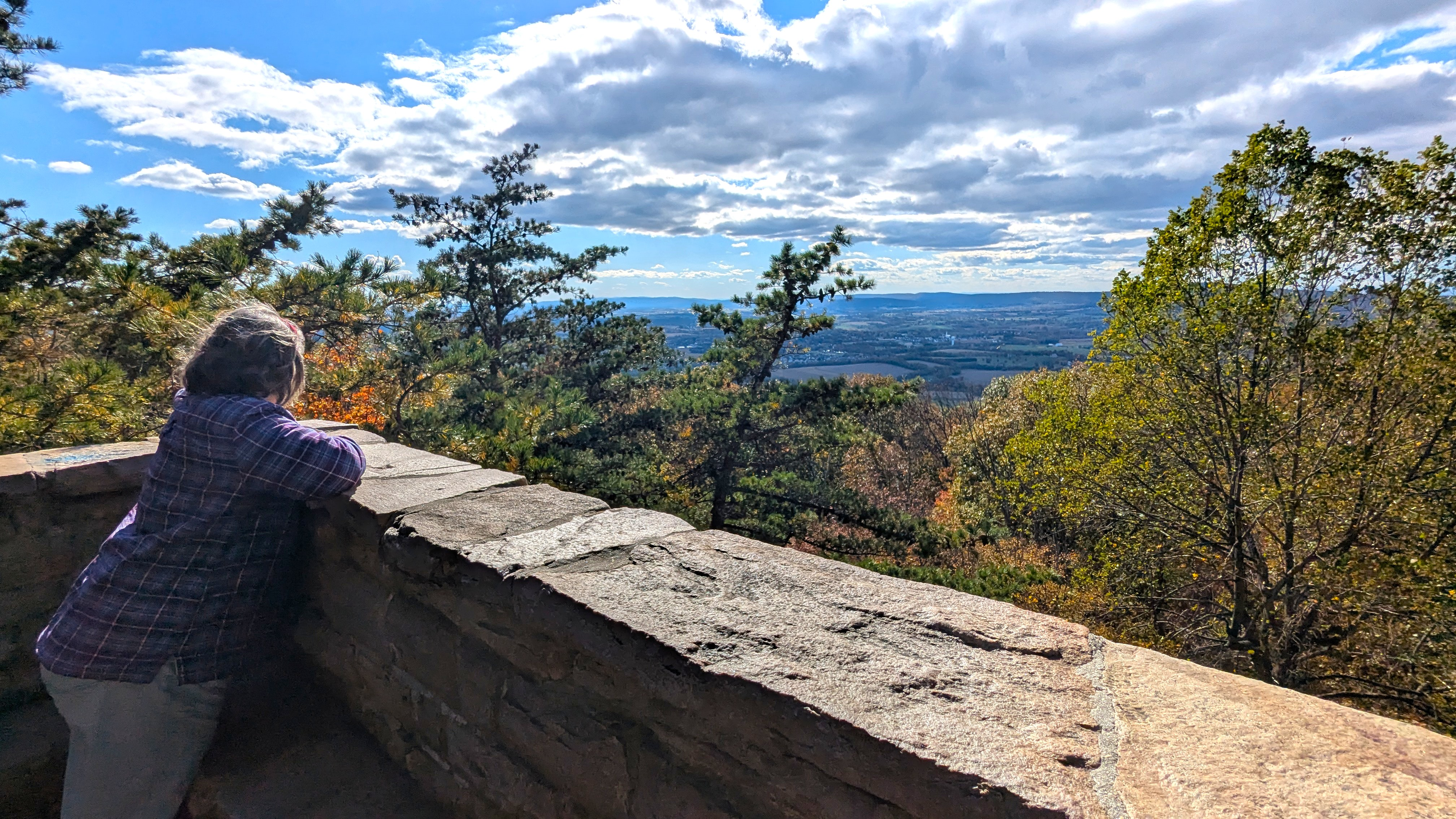
- Vista from one of the park's Middletown Overlook

- Location within Maryland
- Location: Frederick County, Maryland, United States
- Nearest city: Frederick, Maryland
- Coordinates: 39°27′42″N 77°29′42″W
- Area: 1,209 acres (489 ha)
- Elevation: 1,552 ft (473 m)
- Established: 1934
- Administrator: Maryland Department of Natural Resources
- Designation: Maryland state park
- Website: Official website

Gambrill State Park is a Maryland state park located on Catoctin Mountain near the city of Frederick in Frederick County, Maryland. The park is known for the dramatic views of the surrounding area that can be seen from stone overlooks built in the 1930s by the Civilian Conservation Corps. The park is operated by the Maryland Department of Natural Resources.

== Location ==
The park is approximately 51 miles (82 km) northwest of Washington, D.C., and 53 miles (85 km) west of Baltimore on Catoctin Mountain. Gambrill Park Road is located approximately six miles (10 km) away from Frederick on Route 40 West. The park road traverses Catoctin Mountain, and accesses the campground, the trailhead, and the High Knob areas of this park.

== History ==
The park is named after James H. Gambrill, Jr. (1866–1951), a participant in the grain industry and in Frederick city politics, who was a conservationist and frequent visitor to Catoctin Mountain. In an effort to establish a park, Gambrill persuaded his fellow businessmen to purchase the land that now makes up the park and donate it to the city of Frederick. The city then donated the land one year later to the state of Maryland. The state park was dedicated on September 7, 1934. A majority of the park's buildings and structures including its roads, stone overlooks, wooden picnic shelters, Tea Room, and ranger’s residence were constructed in the 1930s by the Civilian Conservation Corps.

== Activities and amenities ==
The park offers trails for hikers and mountain bikers as well as a picnic area with a playground and a small fishing pond.

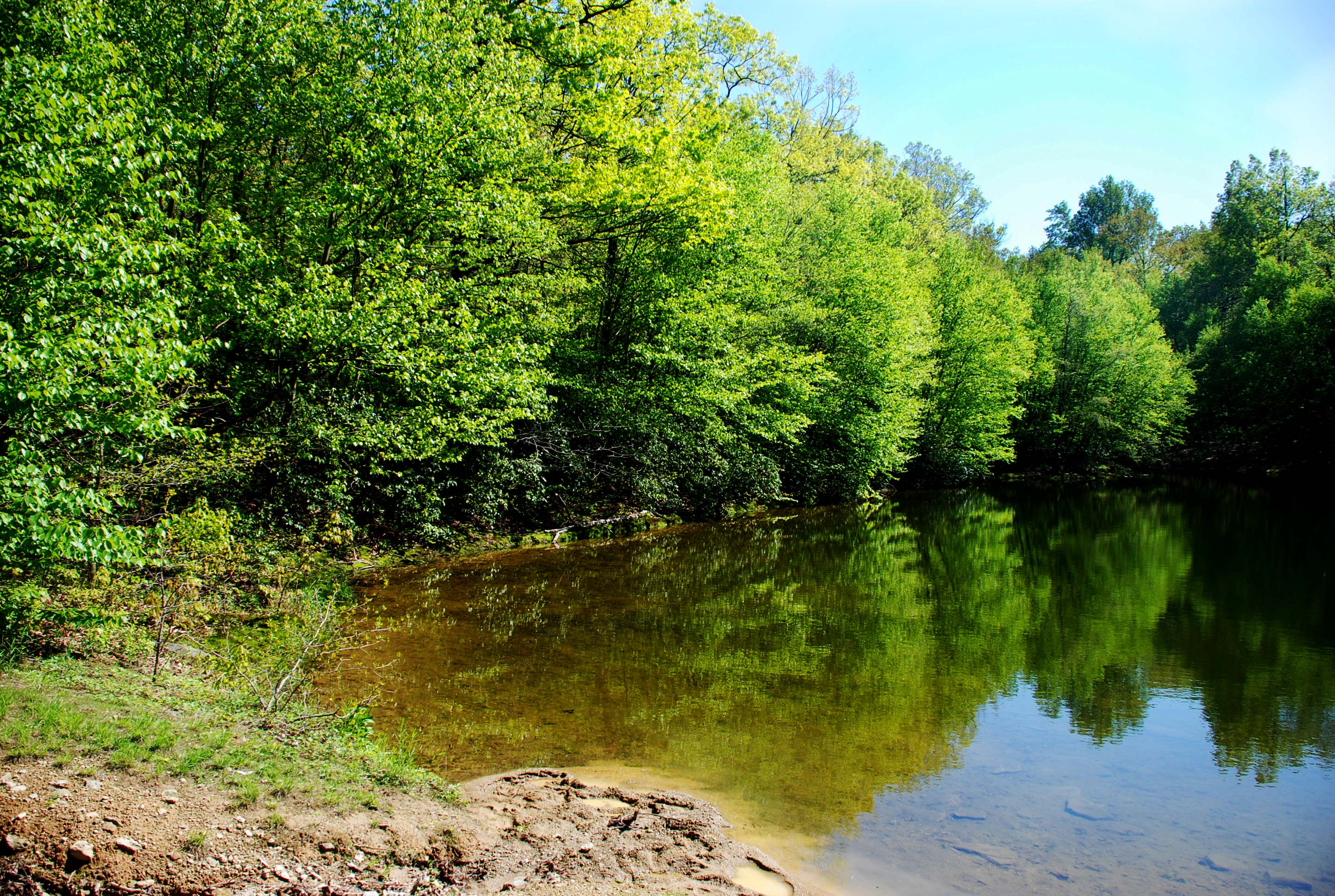
View of a creek in the park

Trails

Each park trail is blazed with its own color scheme; each is maintained by a different volunteer group. The descriptions below are adapted from the official trail guide offered by the State of Maryland.

Trail Name	Blaze	Length	Notes
White Oak	White	1 mile (1.6 km)	Open only to hikers
Red Maple	Red	1 mile (1.6 km)	Connects campground with the rest of the park; one short steep section; maintained by The Trail House store
Green Ash	Green	2 miles (3.2 km)	Several steep slopes and very little level ground; maintained by the Wheel Base bike shop
Black Locust	Black-on-white	3.3 miles (5.3 km)	Several steep slopes mixed with level areas; wooded slopes and views of Frederick Valley to the east and Middletown Valley to the west; maintained by the Potomac Appalachian Trail Club, West Virginia Chapter
Yellow Poplar	Yellow	7.1 miles (11.4 km)	Longest Gambrill trail; passes stone overlooks built by the CCC as it ascends the mountain and goes into the far reaches of the park; maintained by Mid-Atlantic Off Road Enthusiasts
Catoctin Trail	Blue	26.5 miles (42.6 km)	Traverses the state park for approximately 3.0 miles (4.8 km), and continues north through the Frederick City Watershed, Cunningham Falls State Park, and Catoctin Mountain Park, where it ends at Mt. Zion Road, 1.3 miles (2.1 km) north of Owens Creek Campground

Overlooks

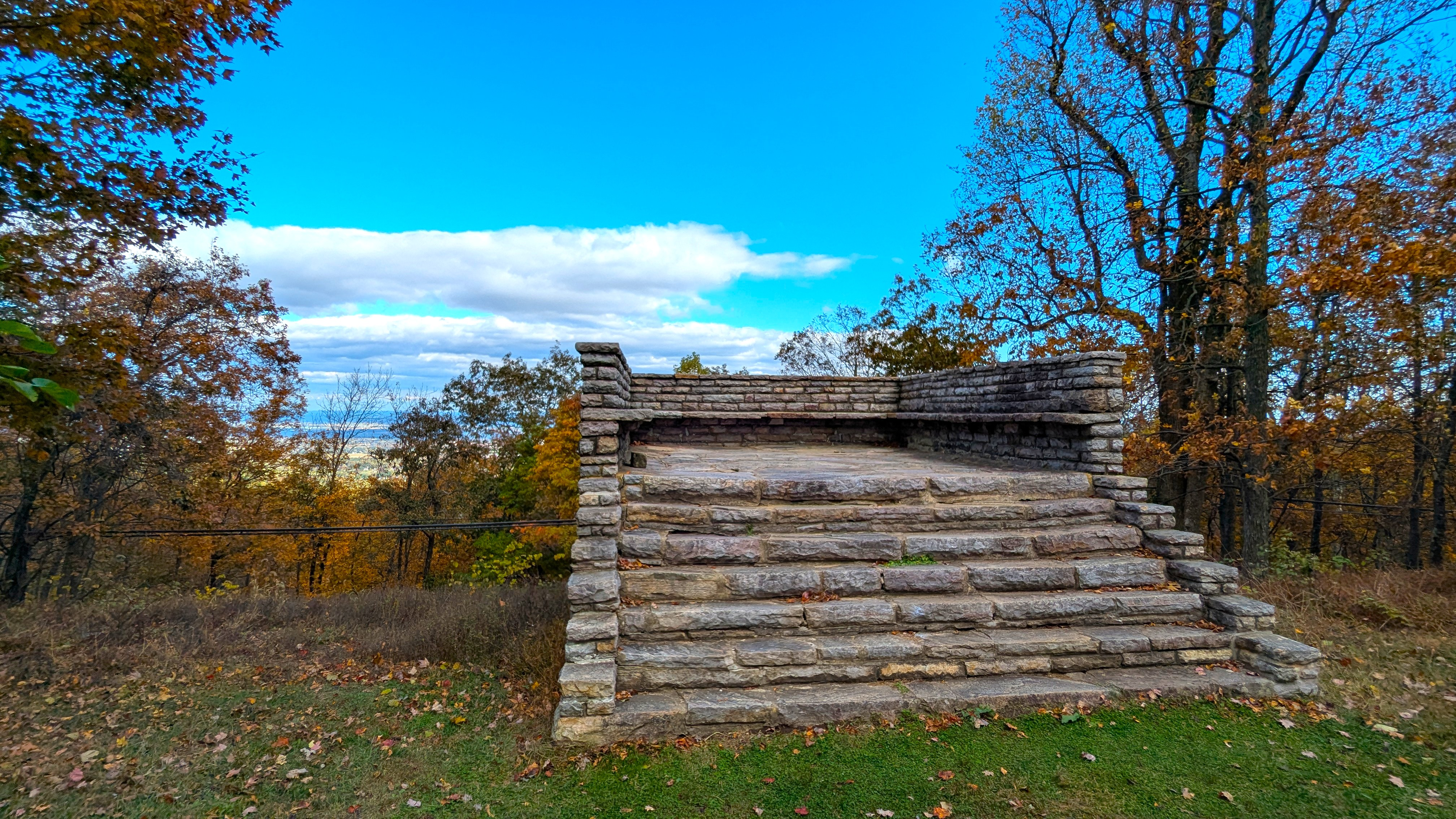
Gambrill State Park's south Frederick stone overlook

Three native stone overlooks located on the 1600-foot (490 m) summit of High Knob, midway between the Mason–Dixon line and the Potomac River, offer views of the surrounding area: north – the rugged tree-covered mountains of the Frederick City Municipal Forest; south – Crampton's Gap, a Civil War landmark and the location of Gathland State Park, as well as the Middletown and Monocacy valleys; west – South Mountain, the site of numerous Civil War engagements.
