= Elk Pond Mountain =

Mountain in Virginia, United States

Highest point
- Elevation: 4,029 ft (1,228 m)
- Prominence: 314 ft (96 m)
- Parent peak: Rocky Mountain, Virginia
- Coordinates: 37°48′44.46″N 79°9′53.10″W

Geography
- Location: Nelson County, Virginia; Rockbridge County, Virginia
- Parent range: Blue Ridge Mountains
- Topo map: USGS Montebello

Elk Pond Mountain is a peak of the Blue Ridge Mountains, on the border of Nelson and Rockbridge counties in Virginia. Elk Pond Mountain is flanked to the east by Maintop Mountain, and to the southwest by Rocky Mountain.

Elk Pond Mountain stands within the watershed of the James River, which drains into the Chesapeake Bay. The east side of Elk Pond Mtn. drains into the North Fork of the Piney River, thence into the Tye River and the James River. The northeastern side of the north end of Elk Pond Mtn. drains into Mill Creek, thence into the South Fork of the Tye River. The northwest side of the north end of Elk Pond Mtn. drains into the headwaters of Irish Creek, thence into the South River, the Maury River, and the James River. The west side of Elk Pond Mtn. drains into Nettle Creek, thence into Irish Creek.

Elk Pond Mountain is in the George Washington National Forest. The Blue Ridge Parkway traverses the west side of Elk Pond Mountain at elevations of about 3,100 feet (900 m). The Appalachian Trail, a 2,170-mile (3,500-km) National Scenic Trail from Georgia to Maine, runs along east side of Elk Pond Mountain.
