= Pignut Mountain =

Mountain in Virginia, United States

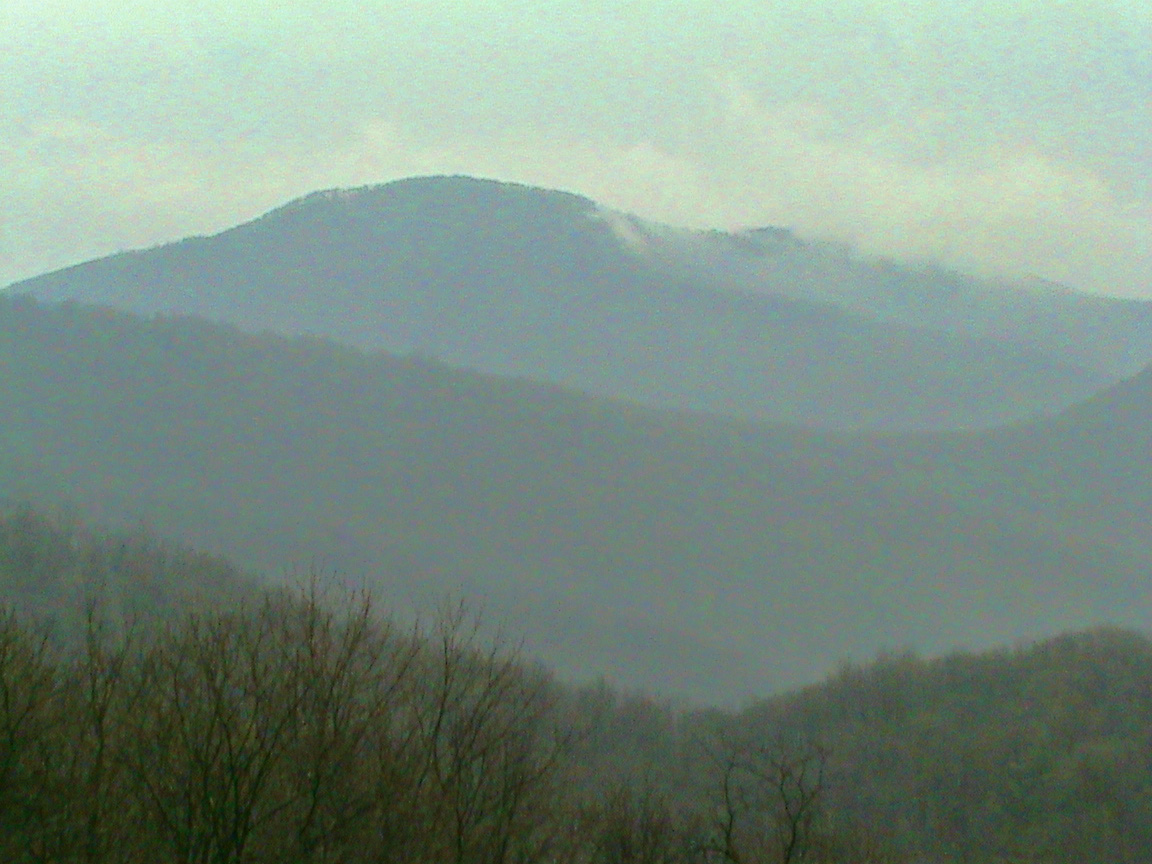
- View of Pignut Mountain from nearby Neighbor Mountain

Highest point
- Elevation: 2,535 ft (773 m)
- Coordinates: 38°43′04″N 78°15′51″W

Geography
- Location: Rappahannock County, Virginia, U.S.
- Parent range: Blue Ridge Mountains

Pignut Mountain is a mountain in Rappahannock County, Virginia. It is part of the Blue Ridge Mountains. Its summit lies within Shenandoah National Park.

== Geology ==
Geologically speaking, the mountain is situated in the northern subprovince of the Blue Ridge Province of the Appalachian Highlands. It is part of the Crystalline Appalachians. Pignut Mountain is separated from the main Blue Ridge by a low gap. The gap is the result of relatively rapid erosion along a geological fault.

== Visiting Pignut Mountain ==
As of 2010, Pignut Mountain is entirely undeveloped and there are no trails or roads leading up the mountain. The summit can be reached by bushwhacking from the Hull School Trail, accessible from Skyline Drive. The closest scenic viewpoints along Skyline Drive from which to view Pignut Mountain are Thornton Hollow Overlook, situated on nearby Neighbor Mountain, Little Devils Stairs Overlook on Hogback Mountain and Rattlesnake Point Overlook on Sugarloaf. Thornton Hollow Overlook provides a view from the west; Little Devils Stairs Overlook provides a view from the north; and Rattlesnake Point Overlook provides a view from the northwest.
