= Catoctin County, Virginia =

Proposed new county in Virginia, US

Coordinates: 39°10′13″N 77°35′01″W

Catoctin County is the name of a proposed new county in Northern Virginia that would be formed from the western portions of Loudoun County. The movement to form the new county began in 2005 with a letter to The Washington Post.

Under the proposal, the area of Loudoun County west of the Catoctin Mountain watershed, known as the Loudoun Valley would be separated from the portion of the county east of that watershed. The eastern portion of Loudoun would retain its name and county government. Purcellville would become the seat of the new county's government. Its name is derived from the Catoctin Mountain whose watershed would make its eastern border and Catoctin Creek which flows through its proposed boundary.

The idea of Catoctin County began as a movement to combat the rapid development of the historically rural western region of Loudoun County, one of the fastest-growing counties in the United States in the 1990s. In general though, the heaviest development has been to the east of Catoctin Mountain in eastern Loudoun.

Support for the movement waned, though it resurfaced in 2012 with the proposed extension of the Metro Silver Line, resulting in increased taxation on Loudoun residents.
