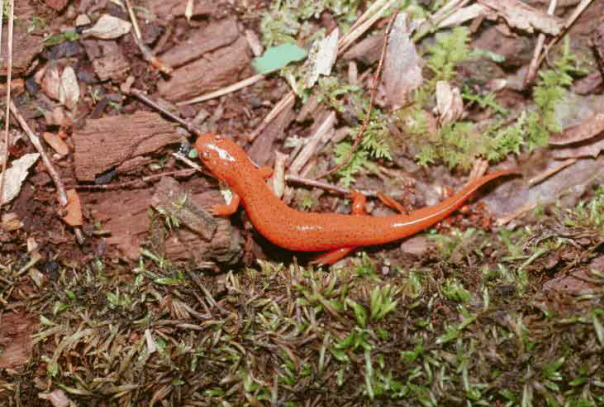
- Pseudotriton montanus

Scientific classification
- Kingdom: Animalia
- Phylum: Chordata
- Class: Amphibia
- Order: Urodela
- Family: Plethodontidae
- Subfamily: Hemidactyliinae
- Genus: Pseudotriton; Tschudi, 1838

Type species
- Salamandra subfusca Green, 1818

Diversity
- 2 or 4 species (see text)

Synonyms
- Mycetoglossus Bonaparte, 1839; Batrachopsis Fitzinger, 1843; Pelodytes Gistel, 1848

= Pseudotriton =

Genus of salamanders

Pseudotriton is a genus of salamanders in the family Plethodontidae. They are endemic to eastern and southern United States, from New York south to Florida and west to southern Ohio, Kentucky, Tennessee, and eastern Louisiana. They are commonly known as red salamanders or mud salamanders.

== Species ==
The number of species depends on the source. The Amphibian Species of the World lists the following four species:

- Pseudotriton diastictus Bishop, 1941 — midland mud salamander
- Pseudotriton flavissimus (Hallowell, 1856) — Gulf Coast mud salamander
- Pseudotriton montanus Baird, 1850 — mud salamander
- Pseudotriton ruber (Sonnini de Manoncourt and Latreille, 1801) — red salamander

However, AmphibiaWeb lists only two species as it treats Pseudotriton diastictus and P. flavissimus as subspecies of Pseudotriton montanus, as does the International Union for Conservation of Nature.
