= Observatory Hill (Virginia) =

Mountain in Virginia, United States

Mount Jefferson
- Location within Virginia Location within the United States

Highest point
- Elevation: 856 ft (261 m)
- Coordinates: 38°01′58″N 78°31′20″W

Geography
- Location: Albemarle County, Virginia, U.S.
- Parent range: Ragged Mountains
- Topo map: USGS Charlottesville West

Observatory Hill is a mountain located just outside Charlottesville, Virginia, United States, in Albemarle County. It lies south of Lewis Mountain, and is positioned at the northeastern edge of the Ragged Mountains. It was known formerly as Mount Jefferson.

It was named Mount Jefferson in honor of Thomas Jefferson after the establishment of the Leander McCormick Observatory on the summit in 1885. Jefferson had urged the purchase of the mountain for the University of Virginia, in part because of its suitability as a site for an observatory. In addition, he valued it for the water resources and the abundance of timber for construction of the university.

Prior to its naming as Mount Jefferson, it had been known as Old Reservoir Mountain and Observatory Mountain (for an observatory which Jefferson directed to be built on the summit).

The mountain is traversed by McCormick Road and Edgemont Road (which also runs along a neighboring ridge — Edgemont or Midmont), and is the site of several other University of Virginia buildings including a deactivated nuclear reactor, a linear accelerator and dormitories. It has been preserved in a largely wooded state for the protection of McCormick Observatory from light pollution. It is used by birdwatchers, mountain bikers, hikers, and students and faculty at The Judge Advocate General's Legal Center and School, U.S. Army, for military physical fitness training. The headquarters for the National Radio Astronomy Observatory are also located on Mount Jefferson.
