= A Tale of the Ragged Mountains =

- Short story by Edgar Allan Poe
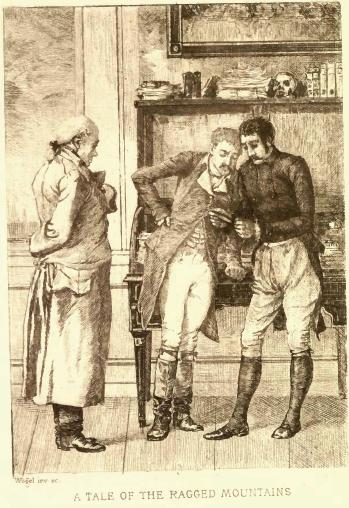
- Illustration for "Tales and poems - vol.2" published in the 1800s

Text available at Wikisource
- Country: United States
- Language: English
- Genres: Adventure; Science fiction Short story

Publication
- Published in: Godey's Lady's Book
- Publisher: Louis Antoine Godey
- Media type: Magazine
- Publication date: 1844

"A Tale of the Ragged Mountains" is a fantastical short story written by Edgar Allan Poe. Set near Charlottesville, Virginia, it is the only story the author set in the state. It was first published in Godey's Lady's Book in April 1844. It was anthologized the following year in Tales, published in New York by Wiley and Putnam.

== Plot summary ==
In late November 1827, the unnamed narrator meets Augustus Bedloe. Because of ongoing problems with neuralgia, Bedloe has retained the exclusive services of 70-year-old physician Dr. Templeton, a practitioner of mesmerism. They developed such a rapport that Templeton could mesmerize Bedloe even when they were not together. The narrator decided to write down their story in 1845 now that "similar miracles" were commonplace.

Bedloe takes morphine every day after breakfast and then hikes the Ragged Mountains. One day, he returns much later than usual and tells the narrator and Dr. Templeton why. On his ramble, he entered a gorge of "absolutely virgin" solitude, filled with a "thick and peculiar mist". The morphine made his surroundings delightfully brilliant. His reverie was interrupted by drumming. Suddenly, he saw a half-naked man chased by a hyena. Stupefied by this bizarre encounter, Bedloe sits beneath a tree and realizes its shadow is that of a palm tree.

The fog clears and Bedloe sees "an Eastern-looking city, such as we read of in the Arabian Tales". Bedloe descends into the city and eventually finds himself barricaded with British officers as a battle rages. Bedloe is struck in the temple by an arrow shaped like "the writhing creese of the Malay". He hovered over his body and floated away from the scene, back to where he saw the hyena. He experienced a galvanic shock that returned him to his normal self, and he walked home.

Bedloe seems to think it is a dream. Dr. Templeton shows him a portrait from 1780 of a man that looks like Bedloe. Templeton explains the subject was his friend Mr. Oldeb, whom he knew from Calcutta during the Warren Hastings administration. When Templeton met Bedloe at Saratoga, he was struck by the resemblance.

Dr. Templeton reveals that every detail Bedloe recalled from his vision was an accurate depiction of the insurrection of Cheyte Sing in Benares. During the skirmish, Warren Hastings led a group of British soldiers and sepoys, and Oldeb was felled by a poisoned arrow. While Bedloe was on his walk in the mountains, Dr. Templeton was writing about the insurrection in a notebook.

A week later, an obituary for "Augustus Bedlo" appears in a newspaper. Dr. Templeton had applied leeches to his patient, and accidentally used a venomous "vermicular sangsues" that proved fatal. The narrator asked the editor why the final e was omitted from Bedloe's name. The editor shrugs it off as a typo, but the narrator recognizes the misspelling as Odleb in reverse.

== Publication history ==
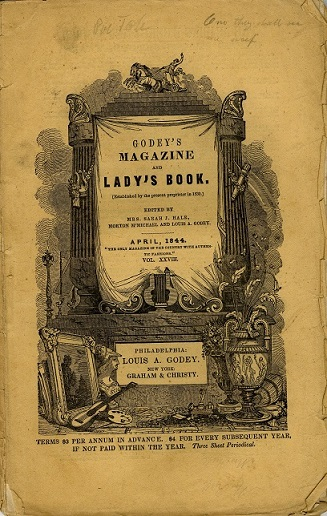
"A Tale of the Ragged Mountains" first appeared in Godey's Lady's Book, April 1844.

The short story first appeared in the April 1844 issue of Godey's Lady's Book. The story also ran in the Baltimore Weekly Sun (March 23), The Baltimore Sun (March 30), and the Columbia Spy (April 27).

The following year, Poe published the story in his Broadway Journal on November 29, 1845. It was also printed in 1846 by Walt Whitman's The Brooklyn Daily Eagle (October 9 and 10).

Charles Baudelaire translated the story into French in 1852. Julio Cortázar made a Spanish translation in 1956.

== Interpretation ==
Augustus Bedloe's rambles in the Ragged Mountains outside Charlottesville are not unlike Poe's when he was a student at the University of Virginia. He was a student at UVA in the 1826–27 academic year, a year before the story begins. Arthur H. Quinn felt the story highlighted Poe's ability to realistically depict the supernatural.

The story is one of several places were Poe quotes Novalis. As Bedloe tries to determine how real his experience was, he quotes the poet's fragment, "we are near waking when we dream that we dream".

In 1909, Maurice Renard grouped Poe's story together with "The Murders in the Rue Morgue" and "The Mystery of Marie Rogêt" as the founding trio of the marvelous scientific romance genre. Poe was writing at a time when mesmerism was considered a science. "A Tale of the Ragged Mountains" is considered science fiction because of the gloss of pseudoscience on the narrative.

One reading of the story holds that Bedloe is Odleb's corpse, which Templeton has suspended through the magnetism of their friendship. Templeton is horrified to realize what he has done. He has a responsibility to break the bond and allow his friend's body to finally rest. Another reading posits that Bedloe suffers from Marfan syndrome, and that Poe was describing the condition five decades before Antoine Marfan first diagnosed it.
