= Catoctin Trail =

Hiking trail in Maryland

Catoctin National Recreation Trail
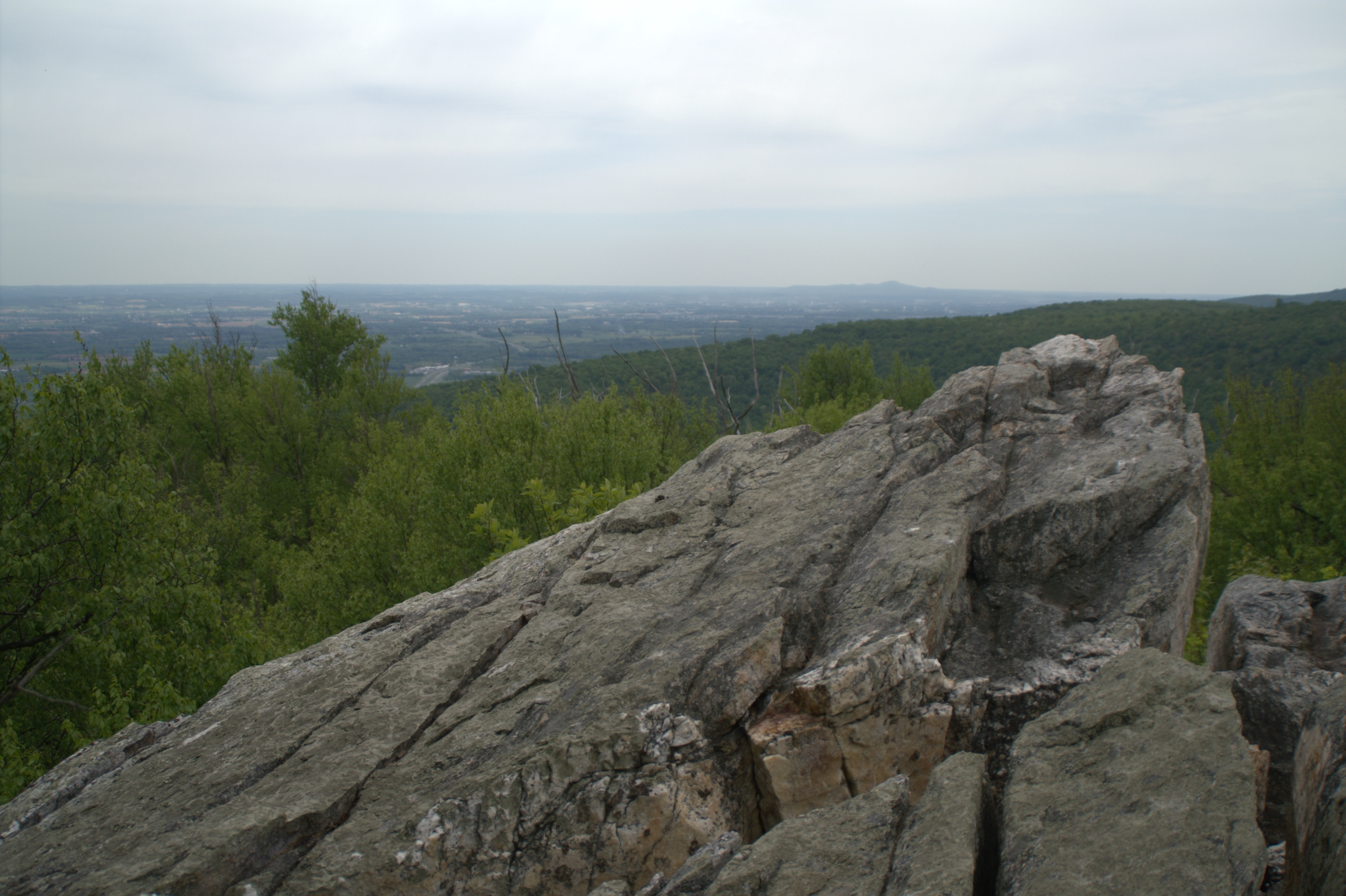
- View from South Bob's Hill Overlook in Cunningham Falls State Park
- Length: 26.6 mi (42.8 km)
- Location: Frederick County, Maryland, USA
- Trailheads: South: Gambrill State Park near Frederick, Maryland; 39°27′43.8″N 77°29′28.5″W; North: Mt. Zion Road just NW of Catoctin Mountain Park; 39°40′19.9″N 77°29′53.9″W
- Use: Hiking
- Elevation change: 5,056 ft (1,541 m)
- Highest point: 1,760 ft (540 m)
- Lowest point: 600 ft (180 m)
- Difficulty: Moderate
- Season: All

The Catoctin National Recreation Trail is a 26.6 mi (42.4 km) hiking trail that traverses federal, state, and municipal woodlands along the northern half of Catoctin Mountain in Frederick County in central Maryland, USA. The hilly terrain is typical of western Maryland with large sections canopied under dense forest cover.

== History ==
Original portions of the trail were constructed in the 1930s by the Works Progress Administration and the Civilian Conservation Corps. The trail was later upgraded and completed by the Potomac Appalachian Trail Club between 1979 and 1982. In 2011, the trail was designated a National Recreation Trail.

== Route ==
The trail's southern terminus begins in Gambrill State Park (GMP). The trail continues north through GMP for approximately 3.0 miles (4.8 km) and then leaves the park and enters the Frederick Municipal Forest (Frederick City Watershed). The trail travels north for 10.6 miles (17.1 km) through the Forest, staying mostly to the east of the ridge crest on the bench of the mountain. As the trail enters Cunningham Falls State Park (CFSP) it descends northeasterly off the bench and into Catoctin Hollow reaching its lowest elevation of 600 feet (180 m) as it crosses Catoctin Hollow Road. After crossing the road the trail turns northwesterly and then climbs to its highest elevation of 1,760 feet (540 m), atop Bob's Hill. After traveling 8.8 miles (14.2 km) through CFSP the trail enters Catoctin Mountain Park (CMP), a unit of the federal National Park Service. The trail traverses 4.2 miles (6.8 km) through the Park to its northern terminus at Mt. Zion Road, 1.3 miles (2.1 km) north of Owens Creek Campground in CMP. From there, the Appalachian Trail may be reached by traveling west on Mt. Zion Road to Raven Rock Road for 2 miles (3.2 km).

== Restrictions ==
- Camping is permitted along the Catoctin Trail only at Rock Run Campground, Gambrill State Park; the Manor and Houck Campgrounds, Cunningham Falls State Park; and Owens Creek Campground, CMP.
