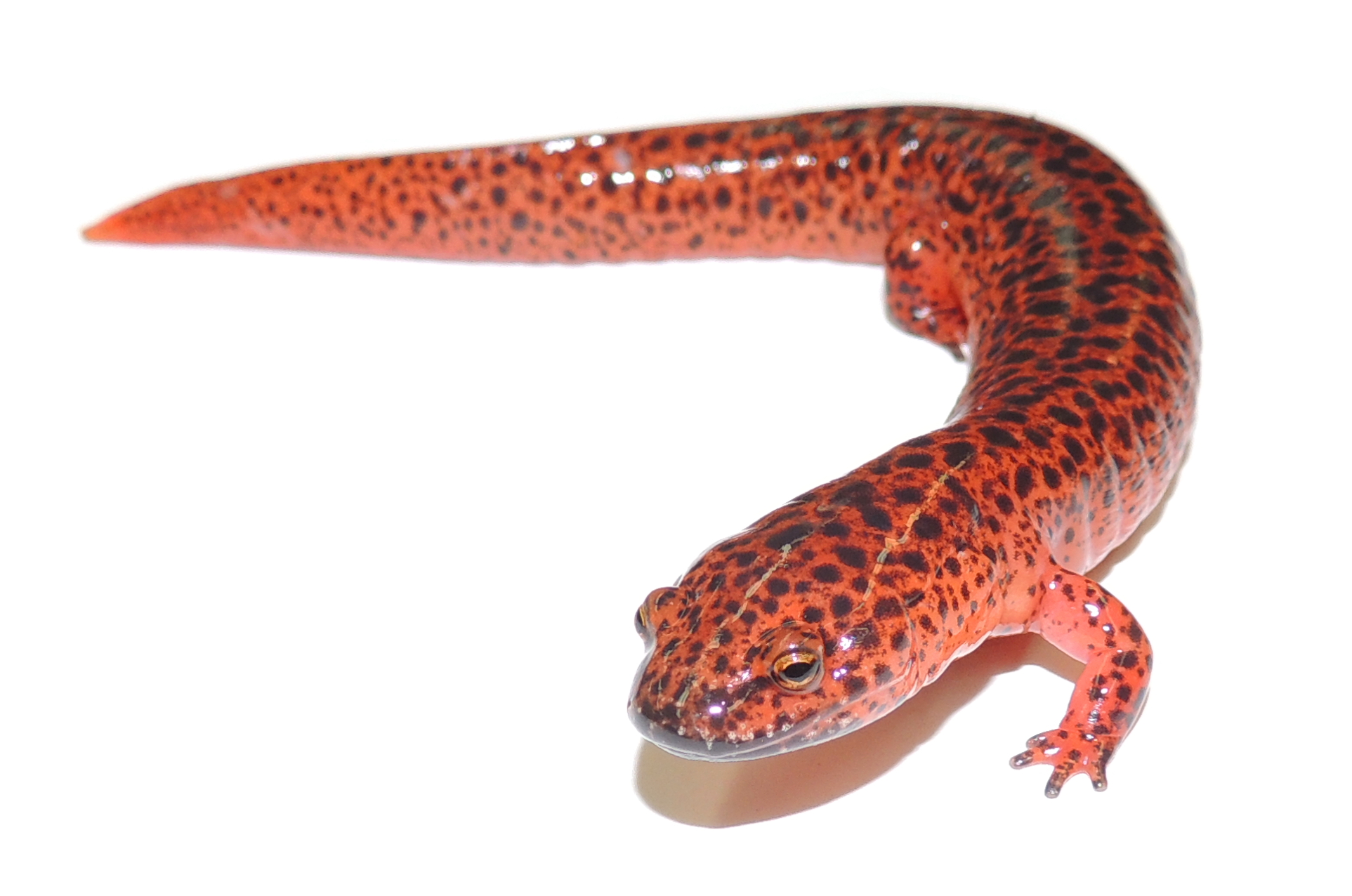

Conservation status
- Least Concern (IUCN 3.1)

Scientific classification
- Kingdom: Animalia
- Phylum: Chordata
- Class: Amphibia
- Order: Urodela
- Family: Plethodontidae
- Genus: Pseudotriton
- Species: P. ruber

Binomial name
- Pseudotriton ruber (Latreille, 1801)

Synonyms
- Salamandra rubra Latreille, 1801; Spelerpes ruber Cope, 1889; Eurycea rubra Stejneger & Barbour, 1917

= Red salamander =

Species of amphibian

The red salamander (Pseudotriton ruber) is a species of salamander in the family Plethodontidae (lungless salamanders) endemic to the Eastern United States. Its skin is brown, orange or red with random black spots. Semiaquatic adults and aquatic larvae live in temperate forests, small creeks, bogs, ponds, intermittent streams, and freshwater springs. Overall this species is common and widespread, but locally it has declined because of habitat loss and it is considered threatened in Indiana and New York. Red salamanders eat insects, earthworms, spiders, small crustaceans, snails, and smaller salamanders. To eat, they extend their tongue to capture prey on the tip of it and retract it back into their mouths. The red salamander, as a member of the family Plethodontidae (lungless salamanders) lacks lungs and respires through its skin.

== Description ==
The Pseudotriton ruber is a medium-large salamander, with adults ranging from 4.3 to 7.1 in (11–18 cm) in total length. It has a relatively stout body with 16–18 coastal grooved sides. Its back varies in color from an orange-brownish tint to a bright red, depending on its age. Like other salamanders, the red salamander seems to lose its color as it ages, becoming more darkly pigmented with less obscure patterns. The larvae of this species have a stout head and body, are dark in coloration, lack spots, and tend to have distinct mottling or streaks. Another distinguishing characteristic of P. ruber is the appearance of numerous irregular black spots down its back. Although the red salamander is brilliantly colored and has many distinguishing features, it is sometimes difficult to tell species apart. P. ruber is most similar in appearance to the mud salamander (P. montanus), but can be distinguished by the difference in size and number of spots running down the dorsum and also by the difference in the color of the iris. Both P. ruber and P. montanus have bright red colorations that have been considered examples of a Müllerian mimetic complex. The red salamander has more spots and the spots also tend to be larger in size than those of the mud salamander. The spots on P. ruber are also said to overlap in many areas, whereas mud salamanders rarely, if ever, do. In regard to eye color, the red salamander's iris is a gold-like tint, whereas the mud salamander's iris is brown. The gold-like tint iris for the red salamander is also distinguished by its horizontal bar that runs through the iris. Mud salamanders typically have a blunter snout than the red salamander. Also, the mud salamanders typically have a more contrasting dorsal and ventral coloration than the red salamanders that are more uniform in color.

== Taxonomy ==
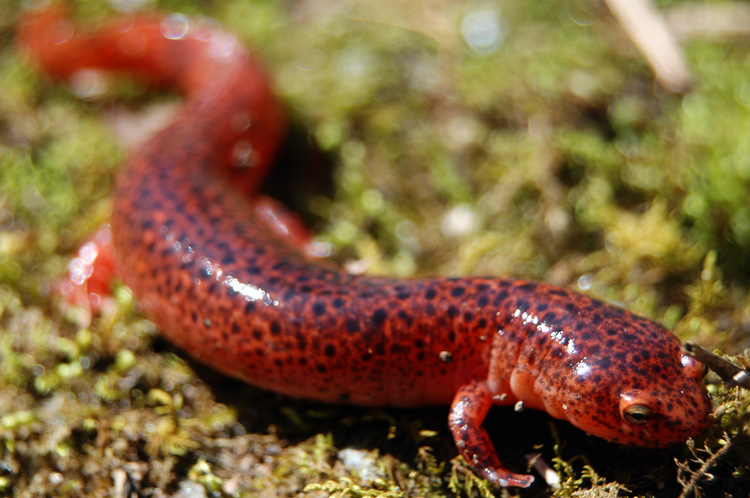
P. ruber

In the Plethodontidae (lungless salamanders), many members respire through their skin and the lining in their mouths. Lunglessness in this family may have evolved due to an adaptation for life in streams, and members of the family Plethodontidae probably did evolve other methods for respiration other than lungs (i.e. gills) due to enhanced survival of larval salamanders in fast-moving stream environments of southern Appalachia. Lungs in general help aquatic animals maintain position in the water column, but the larvae of Plethodontidae members are benthic creatures, therefore the adaptation of lunglessness would be beneficial to them since buoyancy would endanger their survival. The red salamander is further classified as a member of the genus Pseudotriton. Members of this genus include only the red salamander and the mud salamander. Primitiveness in characteristics of the red salamander, mainly involving its breeding behavior, lead many scientists to believe that they are an early ancestor of the Plethodontid clade.

== Distribution ==
The four subspecies of P. ruber are found across the eastern United States, occupying streams through open areas such as fields and meadows and deciduous or mixed hardwood forests, especially near streams, seepages, and damp settings. Red salamanders are also found in deciduous or mixed hardwood forests, especially near streams, seepages, and in leaf packets near spring-fed brooks. Each subspecies is similar in appearance with slight differences in size and coloration, but are found in different habitats. The northern red salamander, P. r. ruber, is characterized as being red or reddish-orange with numerous black spots down its back. This subspecies is the most common and can be found from southern New York and Ohio to northeast Alabama, as well as the Upper Peninsula of Michigan. Similar in appearance to the northern red salamander is the Blue Ridge red salamander, P. r. nitidus. This subspecies differs in that it is slightly smaller and lacks black coloration on the tip of the tail and chin. The Blue Ridge red salamander is found in elevations to more than 5,000 ft (1,500 m) in the southern part of the Blue Ridge Mountains of Virginia. The blackchin red salamander, P. r. schencki, differs in appearance by having strong black coloration under its chin, as well as spotting all the way to the tip of the tail. It can also be found in elevations to more than 5,000 ft (1,500 m) in the Blue Ridge Mountains. The southern red salamander (P. r. vioscai) is often purplish- to salmon-colored and normally has white spots on its head. This subspecies is found from southern South Carolina to southeast Louisiana and southwest Kentucky. All subspecies of P. ruber occupy moist environments such as under moss and stones near clear water sources such as streams or springs. Red salamanders are normally not found near large streams, but instead near smaller water sources.

== Ecology ==
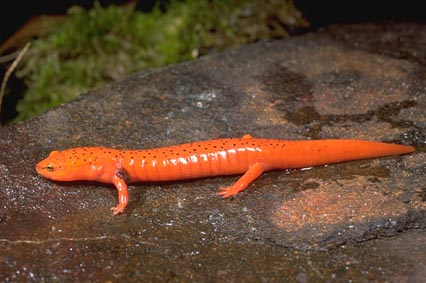
P. ruber

Some important aquatic and terrestrial ecological aspects of this salamander include its diet, predators, and microhabitat preferences. Larvae mainly feed on invertebrates such as insect larvae and worms. Larval diet specifically has been shown to consist of Chironomidae (36.52% of prey items) and Sphaeriidae (15.17%) as well as terrestrial prey (7.87%) and other salamanders. Larval growth rates differ depending on the temperature of the water and tend to be higher in the warmer months when water temperature is higher. The red salamander generally lays eggs in the fall and hatching season takes place in the late fall and winter. The larval period varies between 27 and 31 months and then metamorphosis takes place in the spring and early summer of the third year. The larvae go through metamorphosis after a few weeks or months, depending on the environmental conditions. Larval red salamanders are generalists, eating whatever is available. The rates typically increase when water temperature is low and larger individuals feed more than smaller individuals. Although feeding rates appear to increase with increasing size, mortality rates, though, seem to be independent of size or age and survival is estimated to be about 50% per year. The longer larval period ensures that transformation occurs when the salamanders are much larger than other species of salamanders and typically have a short juvenile period, maturing quickly. Larval duration and size at metamorphosis decrease with increasing elevation. Males mature at about 53–63 mm (2.1–2.5 in), typically at four years of age, and females mature at about 55–68 mm (2.2–2.7 in), typically at about five years of age.

Red salamanders generally live in springs or streams during the winter and then disperse to and from these sites in the fall and spring. Due to its semiaquatic nature, the red salamander remains in terrestrial environments until early spring then disperses to more aquatic sites. Adults often live in burrows along streams and in other moist environments such as under logs and rocks along the forest floor. Adult red salamanders, like their larvae, are generalists and tend to feed on invertebrates (such as earthworms, slugs, snails, spiders, diving beetles, springtails, and other insects), as well as small amphibians, including the red-backed salamander and even some bivalves including the fingernail clams . Its predators include birds and small carnivores such as skunks, raccoons, and even some snake species. Red salamanders are unpalatable to predators and produce distinct tasting skin secretions. Since the red salamander is a large species of salamander, its presence or absence can greatly affect the ecosystem where it lives, and understanding its ecology is important to understand its role in community structures.

== Life history ==
P. ruber has a wide range in its breeding season, which is only limited by extremely cold temperatures. Adults are known to migrate from streams and bodies of water to terrestrial habitats during specific seasons each year. They will then return to aquatic streams in the late summer and early fall to begin breeding. Generally, however, adult red salamanders mate annually and engage in primitive courting activities. Courtship between two red salamanders involves:

"A male approaches a female, rubbing his snout against her snout, cheeks, and chin. The male then moves his head and body under her chin and starts tail undulations. The female then straddles the male's tail and the pair engages in a straddled 'walk' until the male deposits sperm on the substrate. The 'straddle-walk' approximately lasts two minutes and once the sperm is deposited, the female picks up the sperm cap as she moves over it and then they separate."

.

Females are capable of long-term sperm storage and may not lay eggs for months after mating. Females typically lay eggs in the fall or early winter in headwater streams, have very well-hidden nests. The eggs are usually placed in clusters and cling to submerged plants or other objects.

Based on presence of scars and hypertrophied jaws in mature males, it is suggested that male P. ruber might be involved in mate-guarding behavior. Males occasionally court other males as a means of sperm competition to get the other male to deposit spermatophores, giving them a better chance of successful mating over their competitors.

Other important behavioral aspects of P. ruber include its defensive mechanisms. When threatened, red salamanders assume a defensive posture in which they curl their bodies, elevating and extending their rears, and placing their heads under their tails which are elevated and undulated from side to side. The coloration of the red salamander has been hypothesized to mimic that of the red eft stage of the eastern newt (Notophythalmus viridescens) which emits a powerful neurotoxin in their skin. This phenomenon is known as the Mullerian Mimicry Complex. However, this hypothesis was heavily criticized due to significant size differences in the organisms and the differences in the species' times of foraging ( i.e. P. ruber mainly at night and the red eft mainly during the day). More recently, red salamanders have been noted to have reduced palatability, so they are considered part of a Müllerian mimicry system in which all species are unpalatable and benefit from aposematic coloration. In human trials, subjects reported no noxious or repulsive taste of red salamanders. P. ruber possesses pseudotritontoxin that has adverse effects on mice including: hypertension of hind legs and lower back, irritability, hypothermia, coma, and death within 12–48 hours.

== Conservation ==
Overall the red salamander is common and widespread, but locally it has declined because of habitat loss and it is listed as an endangered species in Indiana.

The red salamander is arguably one of the most primitive plethodontids, so is extremely valuable in understanding the links to ancestors and the evolutionary processes that have occurred. Maintaining species diversity is an important part of conservation, and to prevent the loss of salamander diversity as a whole, it is important to have some type of management plan in place to prevent P. ruber from escalating from a low conservation status to a higher level of concern. Since the red salamander prefers streams that are relatively pure, it is important to monitor human waste and pollution, since debris and silt could have adverse effects on their habitat, potentially causing a threat to survival.
