= Furnace Mountain (Virginia) =

Mountain in Virginia, United States

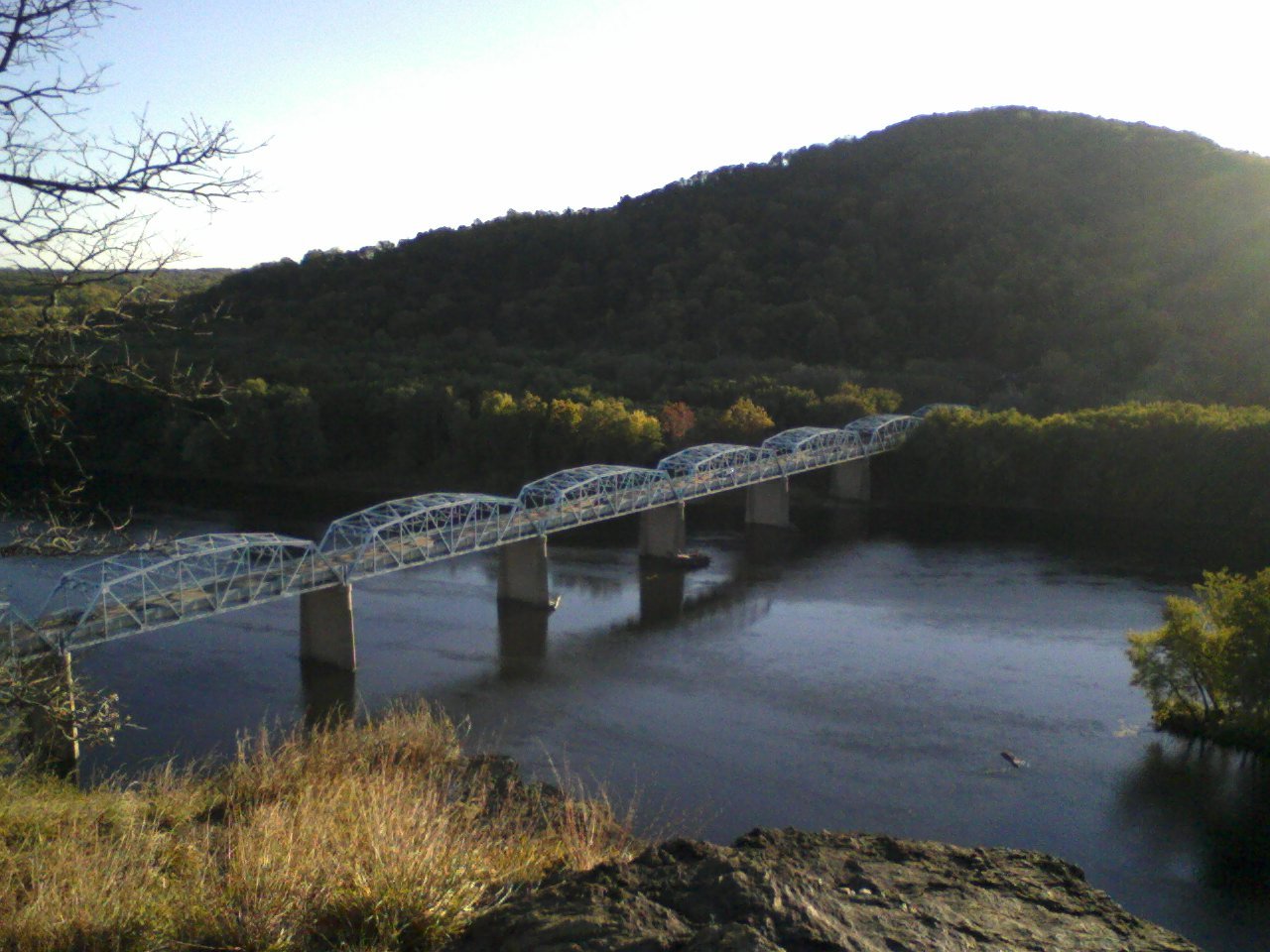
- Furnace Mountain as seen from Point of Rocks, Maryland, with Point of Rocks Bridge in foreground

Highest point
- Elevation: 891 feet (272 m)
- Prominence: 491 feet (150 m)
- Parent peak: Catoctin Mountain
- Coordinates: 39°16′N 77°33′W

Geography
- Location within Virginia
- Location: Loudoun County, Virginia, U.S.
- Parent range: Blue Ridge Mountains

Furnace Mountain is the tallest peak of Catoctin Mountain in Loudoun County, Virginia. It rises steeply from the southern banks of the Potomac River across from Point of Rocks, Maryland and continues southward for 1 mile (1.6 km), reaching an elevation of 891 feet (272 m) before falling to a gap between it and an unnamed peak of 800 feet (240 m). Its name arises from the iron furnaces located at its base, which operated from the 1790s to the 1870s. The furnaces were used to process iron ore mined from the mountain, much of which was used to build the burgeoning city of Washington D.C.
