= Neighbor Mountain =

Part of Blue Ridge Mountains in Virginia, US

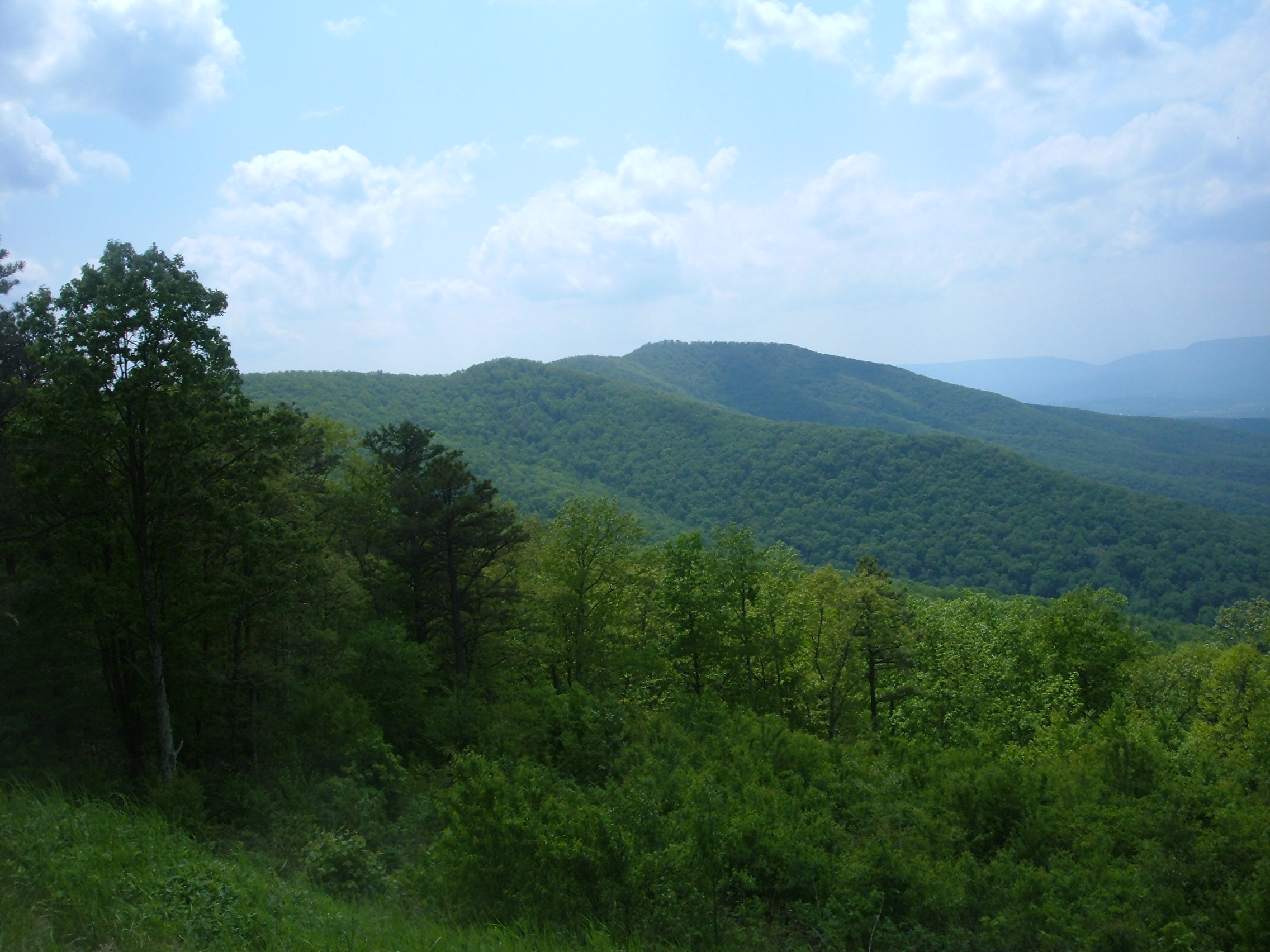
- View along Neighbor Mountain from Jeremy's Run Overlook

Highest point
- Elevation: 2,612 ft (796 m)
- Coordinates: 38°41′46″N 78°21′27″W

Geography
- Location: Page County, Virginia, U.S.
- Parent range: Blue Ridge Mountains

Climbing
- Easiest route: Skyline Drive

Neighbor Mountain is a mountain in Page and Rappahannock Counties, Virginia, near the city of Luray. It is part of the Blue Ridge Mountains. Its summit lies in Page County, within Shenandoah National Park.

== Geology ==
Geologically speaking, the mountain is situated in the northern subprovince of the Blue Ridge Province of the Appalachian Highlands. It is part of the Crystalline Appalachians. Neighbor Mountain is separated from parallel Knob Mountain to the west by a stream known as Jeremy's Run.

== Political boundaries ==
The crest of the northern arm of Neighbor Mountain forms part of the border between Page and Rappahanock Counties. Page County is located to the west of the ridge, whereas Rappahannock County is to the east.

As the mountain curves south-west, the county border follows the topographical spine of the Blue Ridge from Neighbor Mountain onto Pass Mountain to the south, and the south-western arm lies entirely within Page County. On this south-western arm are a series of knobs known as "Three Sisters."

During the 2012 summer wildfire on Neighbor Mountain, firefighters had to get permission from private landowners to access ponds and lakes for water.

== Visiting ==
Neighbor Mountain is accessible via Skyline Drive, which runs along the ridge of the mountain's northern arm. The Appalachian Trail also runs parallel to Skyline Drive along this part of the mountain. The south-western arm of the mountain is accessible from the Appalachian Trail via the Neighbor Mountain Trail. Skyline Drive offers two scenic overlooks on the mountain. Jeremy's Run Overlook is situated on the northern arm, while Thornton Hollow Overlook is situated near the summit.
