= The Priest (mountain) =

Mountain in Virginia, United States

The Priest (DePriest)
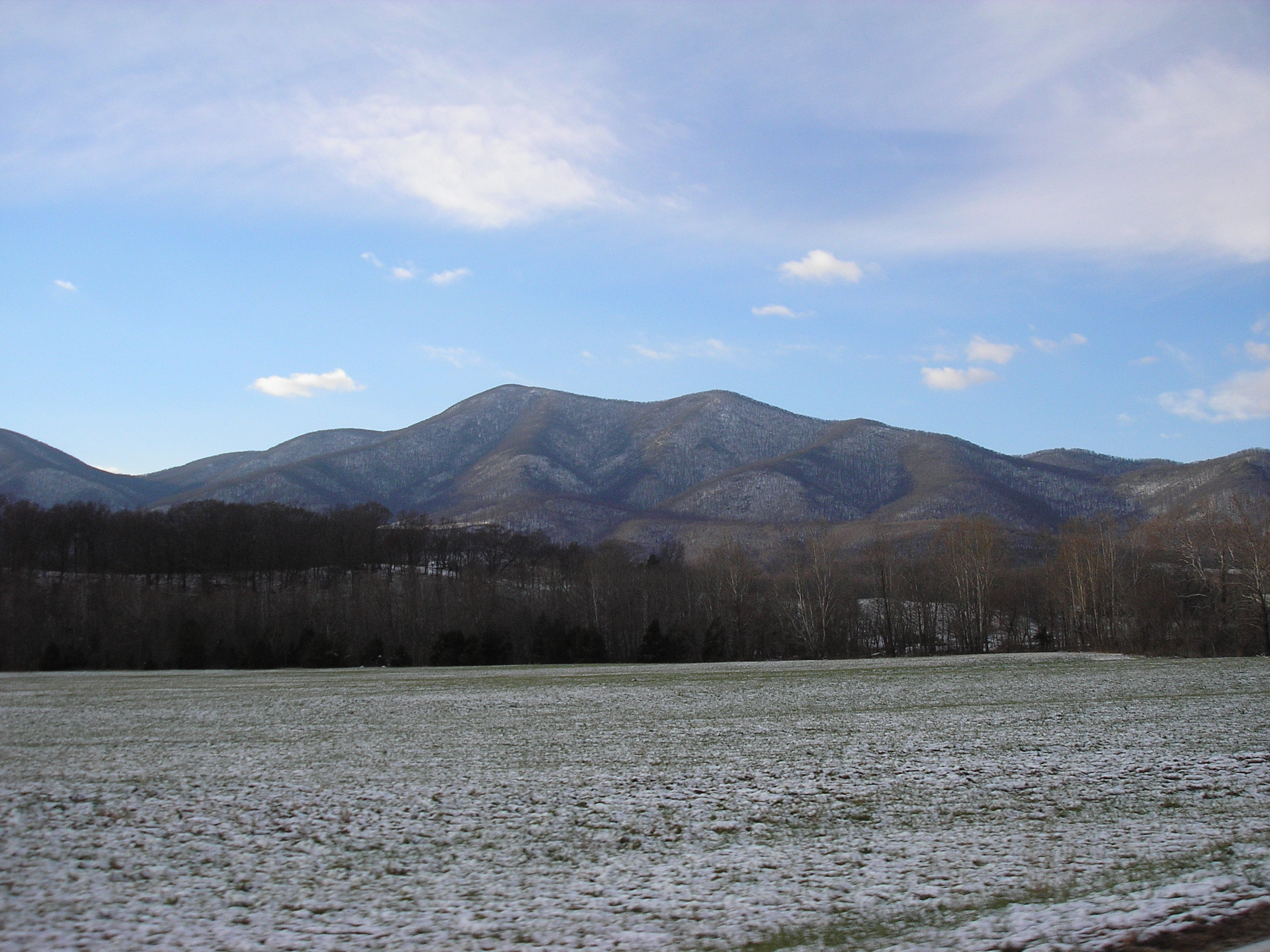
- Priest Mountain as seen from Massies Mill, Va. 12-5-2010

Highest point
- Elevation: 4,063 ft (1,238 m)
- Prominence: 800 ft (240 m)
- Coordinates: 37°49.19′N 79°3.75′W

Geography
- Location: Nelson County, Virginia
- Parent range: Blue Ridge Mountains
- Topo map: USGS Massies Mill

Climbing
- Easiest route: Hike

The Priest (DePriest) is a mountain in Nelson County, Virginia. The peak of the mountain is the highest point in the county. The mountain is on a spur off the main Blue Ridge Mountains, about 3.5 miles (5.5 km) east of Maintop Mountain, located in the Priest Wilderness of the George Washington National Forest.

In 1754, John DePriest along with brothers Langsdon and Randolph DePriest, fought in the French and Indian War with George Washington, and throughout the American Revolution. In 1780, Thomas Jefferson granted 10,000 acres in Nelson County to John DePriest for his service to Virginia. The DePriest Mountain and Little DePriest mountain were included within the land grant.

The Priest stands within the watershed of the Tye River, which drains into the James River. The north side of The Priest drains into Coxs Creek, thence into the Tye River. The south side of The Priest drains into Rocky Run, thence into the Tye. The west side of The Priest drains into Shoe Creek, thence into the Piney River and the Tye River.

The Appalachian Trail, a 2,193-mile (3,529.29-km) National Scenic Trail from Georgia to Maine, runs across the summit of The Priest. The summit is reachable via the Appalachian Trail from a trail head along Virginia State Route 56. The hike gains 3000 vertical feet from base to summit.

Crabtree Falls flows down the Priest's northwest slope. The Crabtree Falls trail and Forest Development Road 826 can be used for access to the Appalachian Trail and the Priest's summit.
