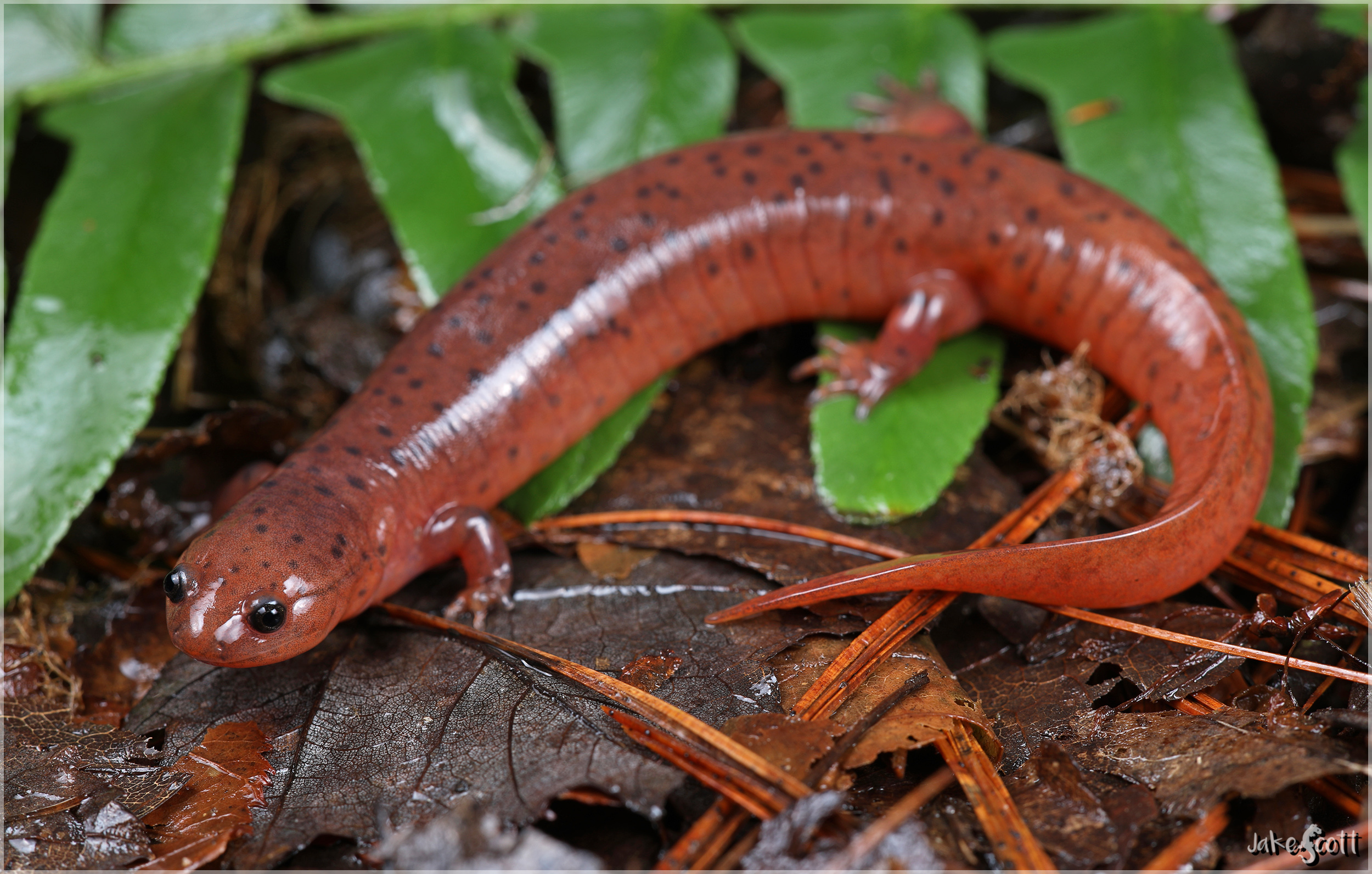
- The "eastern" subspecies, P. m. montanus
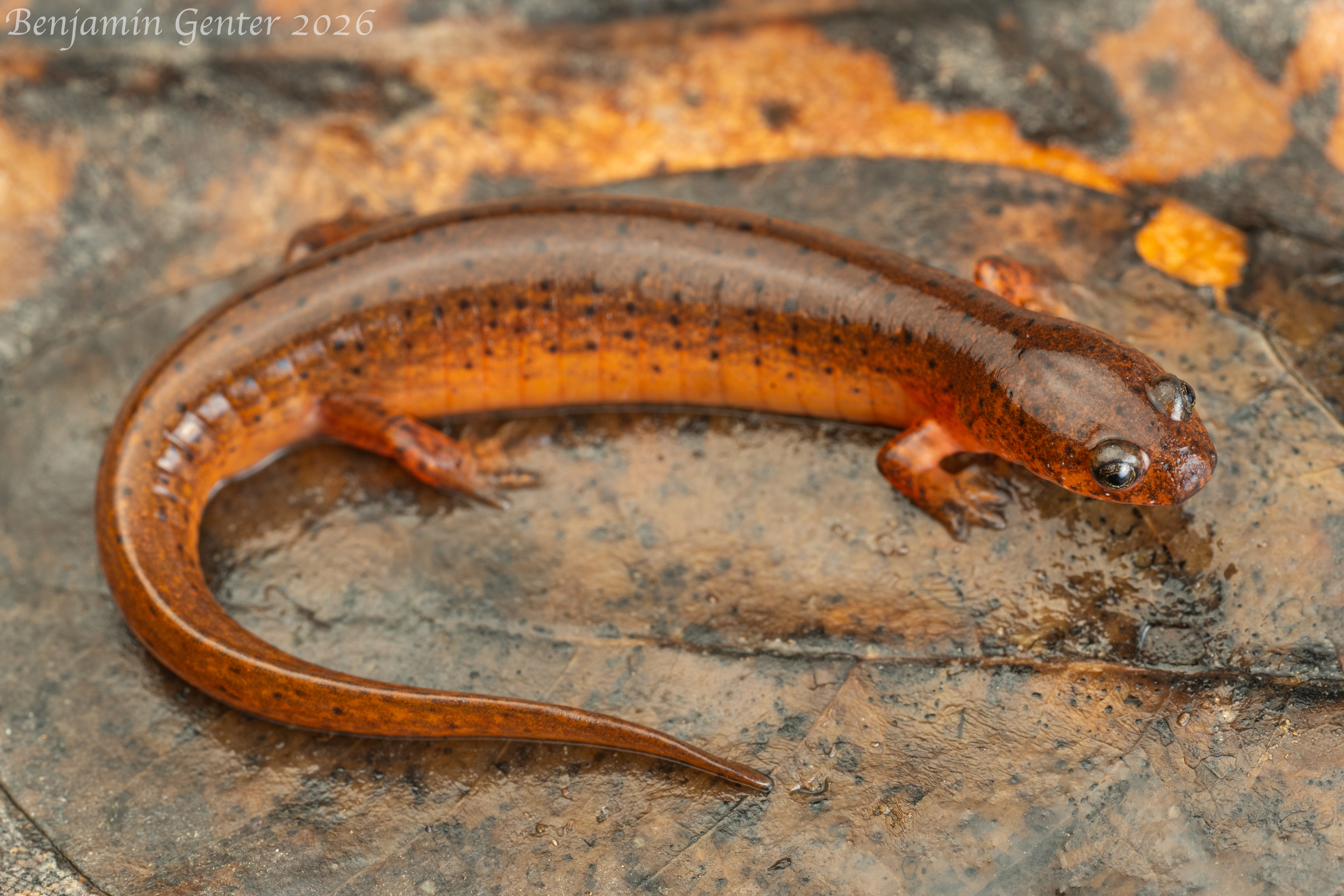
- The "gulf coast" subspecies, P. m. flavissimus

Conservation status
- Least Concern (IUCN 3.1)

Scientific classification
- Kingdom: Animalia
- Phylum: Chordata
- Class: Amphibia
- Order: Urodela
- Family: Plethodontidae
- Genus: Pseudotriton
- Species: P. montanus

Binomial name
- Pseudotriton montanus Baird, 1850

= Mud salamander =

Species of amphibian

The mud salamander (Pseudotriton montanus) is a bright red salamander of the family Plethodontidae. It is found in streams, seeps and swamps and underneath logs, rocks and leaves. It is endemic to the eastern half of the United States with one isolated population in central Mississippi. Mud salamanders are rarely seen plethodontids that inhabit muddy wetland and riparian habitats. Mud salamanders don't generally live above 700 meters in elevation in the Appalachian Mountains, resulting in two geographically isolated populations. Mud salamanders have short stocky bodies ranging from 7.5 to 16 cm long. Body color ranges with age and locality. There are four subspecies in the mud salamander complex, namely the Gulf Coast mud salamander, rusty mud salamander, Midland mud salamander and the eastern mud salamander. Mud salamanders are ectothermic, meaning that they cannot control their body temperature and it fluctuates with the temperature. The mud salamander is readily confused with two other species, the red salamander (Pseudotriton ruber) and the spring salamander (Gyrinophilus porphyriticus).

== Taxonomy ==
The taxonomy of Pseudotriton montanus and its closest relatives is unsettled. Several subspecies have been described, and some of these might warrant full species rank. In particular, Pseudotriton diastictus maybe treated as a species or a subspecies (Pseudotriton montanus diastictus). The rest of this article is following the latter position. The four recognized subspecies include the Eastern Mud Salamander (P. m. montanus), Midland Mud Salamander (P. m. diastitctus), Gulf Coast Mud Salamander (P. m. flavissimus) and the Rusty Mud Salamander (P. m. floridanus).

== Description ==
The larvae of Pseudotriton montanus are slender and uniformly light in color, with brown pigmentation in small irregular blotches and flecks. Depending on location, the larval stage can last between 1.5-2.5 years.

Adult mud salamanders are known for their reddish-brown color, brown eyes, stocky girth, and short tails. They have between 30 and 40 distinct round black spots on their backs by the time they reach adulthood. Younger mud salamanders are typically bright red, orangish-brown, or crimson, with unmarked stomachs and separated spots. As they age, the salamanders darken to a dark purplish-red or even brown. Juveniles may gain more spots, but older individuals can display fainter spots or completely lose their spots altogether. Body color also varies with locality. Coastal mud salamanders tend to be more dark and drab, whilst inland mud salamanders are brighter and have more contrast against the black polka dots that sporadically pattern their bodies.

Mud salamanders can reach lengths of 3–8 in (7.6–20.3 cm) in adulthood, and are typically stocky. They have 16 to 17 coastal grooves found along the dorsal sides of their bodies.

The mud salamander is readily confused with two other species, the red salamander (Pseudotriton ruber) and the spring salamander (Gyrinophilus porphyriticus). It can be distinguished from the red salamander by looking at the eyes and snout. While the mud salamander has dark brown eyes and a short snout, the red salamander has golden yellow eyes and a long snout. Mud salamanders also have widely separated dorsal spots while the red salamander has spots in closer proximity. The mud salamander can be distinguished from the spring salamander by having a shorter body length, and by not having the nasal ridge associated with spring salamanders.

The mud salamander produces a proteinaceous skin toxin along the backside of its body that can induce symptoms such as extreme irritability, hypothermia, and physical weakness in their predators.

== Reproduction ==
Mud salamanders breed during the warmer months of the year. Egg deposition commonly occurs during autumn and winter. The females reproduce at most once per year (usually once per two years), while males may breed several times a year. It is thought that the irregular reproductive cycle of females is a facultative adaptation which prolongs life during variable mortality rates and can increase overall reproductive success. Females in this species produce extremely large egg clutches for a plethodontid. "When a mate is found, the male performs a tail undulation display. The female then straddles his tail, allowing glands on the male's tail to lubricate her. The male is then able to deposit his sperm into the female". Females reach reproductive maturity around four to five years old, while males reach reproductive maturity around two to two and a half years old. The males will reach sexual maturity their first year after metamorphosis, but will reach breeding condition after a few summers. Males will breed every year while females typically breed every other. The males will produce sperm annually and try to mate between July and November, and the females will begin to oviposit in the fall. "A female may stay with her eggs to aid the incubation process. Incubation typically lasts three or more months, with embryos hatching in the winter. Clutches range in size between 65 and 200 and increases as a function of body size. P. montanus has greater fecundity than the red salamander.

== Habitat ==
The mud salamander inhabits swamps in low elevations, bogs, seeps, springs, and streams that not only provide a muddy bottom, but also clean and clear water. Recent studies have shown them in higher elevation habitats in Southern Appalachia. The mud salamander, a burrowing species, seeks shelter in burrows beneath leaf litter, logs, stones, or bark. The mud salamander may also build tunnels in creek banks, as well. These amphibians spend most of their lives in close proximity to water, but also burrow into the soil of the surrounding area. Larvae are usually underground in muddy springs; they are often found in leaf litter, debris, and muck of muddy springs, seeps, and streams. After they lose their gills and become adults, they make burrows in muddy areas. They often use burrows of crayfish and will sit with their heads sticking out of these burrows waiting for prey to pass by. They come out of these burrows at night and forage in the surrounding area. Generally, mud salamanders do not wander as far from their main habitat as their close relatives, the red salamanders. Mud salamanders seem to favor small, muddy seeps and springs that dry up in the summer. Both larval and adult mud salamanders go deep underground during the hottest months of the summer, especially in the small springs and seeps that dry up. The gilled larvae go deep in the mud where the water is underground and the adults remain deep in burrows. During the hottest times of the year, they are usually only found at night or during rains foraging for a short time before they return to their burrows in the mud. Dusky salamanders are often found in the same habitat as mud salamanders and are much easier to find than the mud salamanders. When this is the case, the more abundant dusky salamanders often serve as a food source for the mud salamanders. There are many scenarios where small muddy springs where mud salamanders live feed into larger streams that have more common species such as dusky and two-lined salamanders. In this case, the muds venture into the main stream and can often be found in it because they are looking for more food outside of their smaller, more primary habitat. One reason for this is less competition outside of a smaller habitat full of mud salamanders, another reason is the abundant two lined and dusky salamanders that are food for the larger muds. They can often be found in creeks that do not seem like ideal habitat for them because they have ventured out of their primary habitat for food. Chances are an ideal muddy habitat is within walking distance from where the mud salamander was found in the stream.

== Predator avoidance ==
The only recorded predators of mud salamanders are snakes. Water snakes have been shown to feed on larva while garter snakes feed on adults. Pseudotriton montanus exhibits anti-predator techniques such as curling the body, extending rear limbs, and raising its tail to its head to appear larger, as well as being able to release a toxic substance along its dorsum. This toxin, pseudotritontoxin, is only found in the mud salamander and the red salamander. The toxin released from the salamander has been reported to have a distinct foul taste to humans. This toxicity has been equated to being somewhere between the dusky salamander and highly unpalatable red eft. The coloration and defensive posture of the mud salamander has been hypothesized to mimic that of the red eft stage of the eastern newt (Notophthalmus viridescens) which emits a powerful neurotoxin in their skin compared to the mild toxin they produce. This is an example of Mullerian mimicry or when an already toxic species is mimicking another toxic species.

== Diet ==
A mud salamander's diet varies with age. In the larval stage, the small creatures tend to feed on equal-sized or smaller, aquatic invertebrates. The salamander larvae are also said to consume other salamander larvae. As an adult, though, the salamander's diet increases in variety, but it still eats smaller prey. Though not much is known about an adult salamander's eating habits, it is known that they are likely to feed on earthworms, beetles, spiders, and even smaller kinds of salamanders. Mud salamanders also can eat invertebrates as small as mites. What the mud salamander tends to eat however, mainly lies in the habitat in which it lives.

== Conservation status ==
Because of the mud salamander's extreme rarity in Virginia, it was put on the threatened species list in 1979. The Virginia Herpetological Society regards this species to be secure globally, but in danger in Virginia because of its extreme rarity there. Many surveys and searches were run in the 1980s to locate the populations of the mud salamander in western Virginia. Although efforts were great, few sightings of this species were made. Because little information about the species is known, it is difficult to find possible threats, but threats to other types of salamanders probably affect mud salamanders. Update: 4/24/2016 found in National Forest in Lumpkin County, near Dahlonega, GA. 3/28/18. 1 individual found in Eastern Kentucky on a survey of local species by Mr Torrey A. Stegall. County not specified due to their rarity in the state, but it was made clear that the individual was found in the Daniel Boone National Forest.
