= Catoctin Mountain =

Mountain ridge in the United States

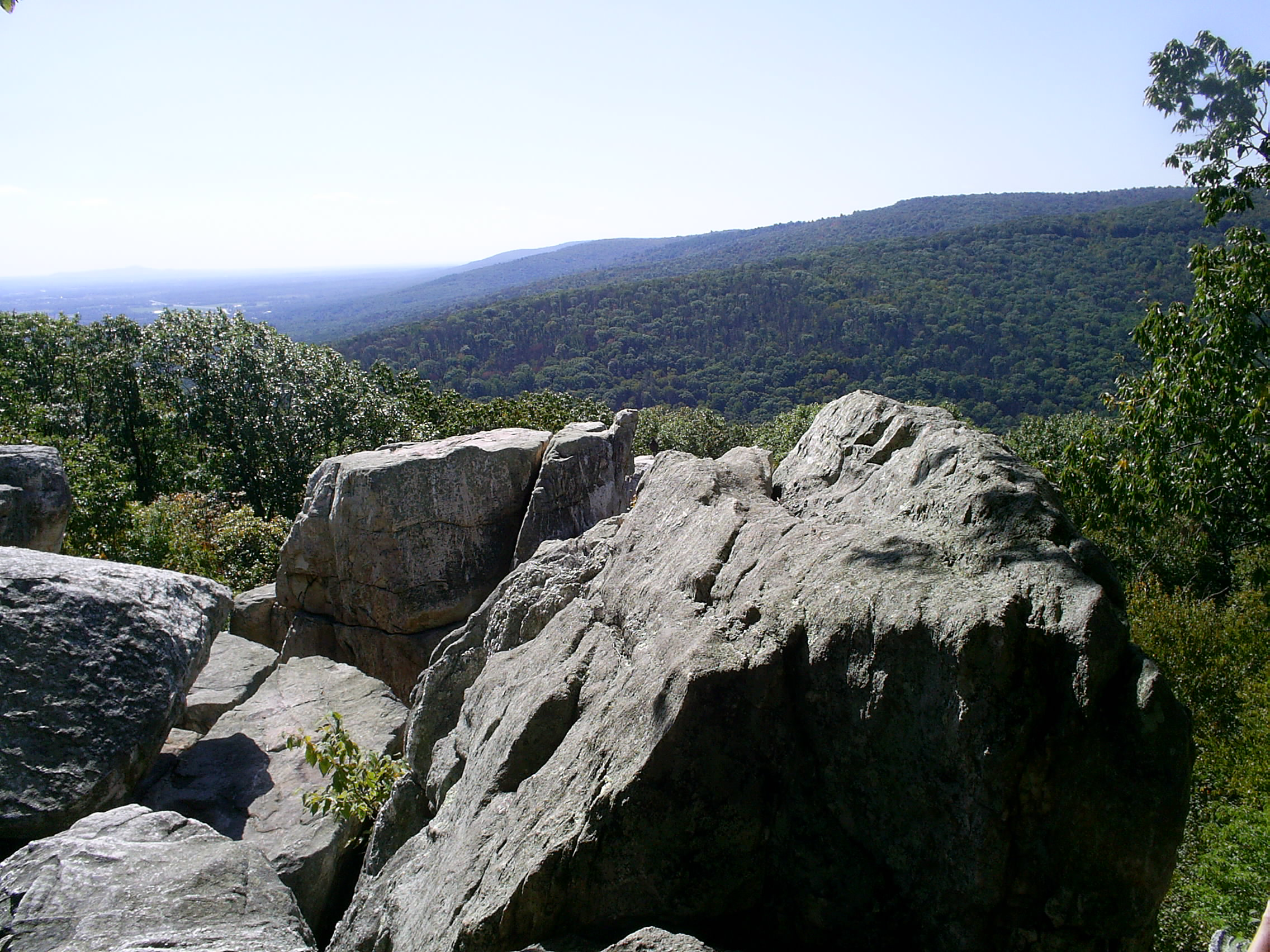

Highest point
- Elevation: 1,880 ft (570 m)
- Prominence: 404 ft (123 m)
- Coordinates: 39.64641°N 77.45401°W

Geography
- Location within Maryland
- Location: Frederick County, Maryland / Loudoun County, Virginia, U.S.
- Parent range: Blue Ridge Mountains of the Appalachian Mountain Range
- Topo map: USGS Blue Ridge Summit

Climbing
- Easiest route: road (restricted access)

Catoctin Mountain, along with the geologically associated Bull Run Mountains, forms the easternmost mountain ridge of the Blue Ridge Mountains, which are in turn a part of the Appalachian Mountains range. The ridge runs northeast–southwest for about 50 miles (80 km) departing from South Mountain near Emmitsburg, Maryland, and running south past Leesburg, Virginia, where it disappears into the Piedmont in a series of low-lying hills near New Baltimore, Virginia. The ridge forms the eastern rampart of the Loudoun and Middletown valleys.

== Geography ==
Catoctin Mountain traverses Frederick County, Maryland and extends into northern Loudoun County, Virginia. It rises to its greatest elevation of 1,900 feet (580 m) above sea level just southwest of Cunningham Falls State Park and is transected by gaps at Braddock Heights (Fairview Pass), Point of Rocks on the Potomac River and Clarke's Gap west of Leesburg, as well as several other unnamed passes in Maryland and Virginia. The mountain is much lower in elevation in Virginia, reaching its highest peak just south of the Potomac at Furnace Mountain (891 feet/271 m) and with only one peak above 800 feet (240 m) south of Leesburg.

From its northern terminus in Maryland headed south, the range is composed mainly of a single north–south running ridge with periodic low-lying gaps, though it does contain several spur ridges, most notably near its intersection with South Mountain at its northern terminus. Its ridge character continues south of the Potomac in northern Loudoun County, losing elevation, until just north of Leesburg, where the range widens into a broad plateau of undulating hills separated by deep stream valleys. The range reaches its widest point north of Goose Creek at nearly three miles. South of the creek the Catoctin vanishes into the Piedmont countryside near the northern terminus of the Bull Run Mountains at Aldie.

== Recreation ==
A number of federal, state, local, and private protected lands are located on Catoctin Mountain including the Emmitsburg Reservoir, Catoctin Mountain Park, Cunningham Falls State Park, the Frederick Municipal Forest, Gambrill State Park, the Chesapeake and Ohio Canal National Historical Park, all in Maryland, and the Morven Park estate in Virginia.

The 27-mile (43 km) long Catoctin Trail traverses the northern half of the range. The trail, which is maintained by the Potomac Appalachian Trail Club, starts at Gambrill State Park, which also contains several shorter hiking and mountain biking trails as well as picnic pavilions, and continues north through the Frederick Municipal Forest to Cunningham Falls State Park and Catoctin Mountain Park. Both parks contain many shorter hiking trails and organized campgrounds.

The Journey Through Hallowed Ground Byway, a National Scenic Byway, loops and weaves through the northern part of the range.

== Names ==
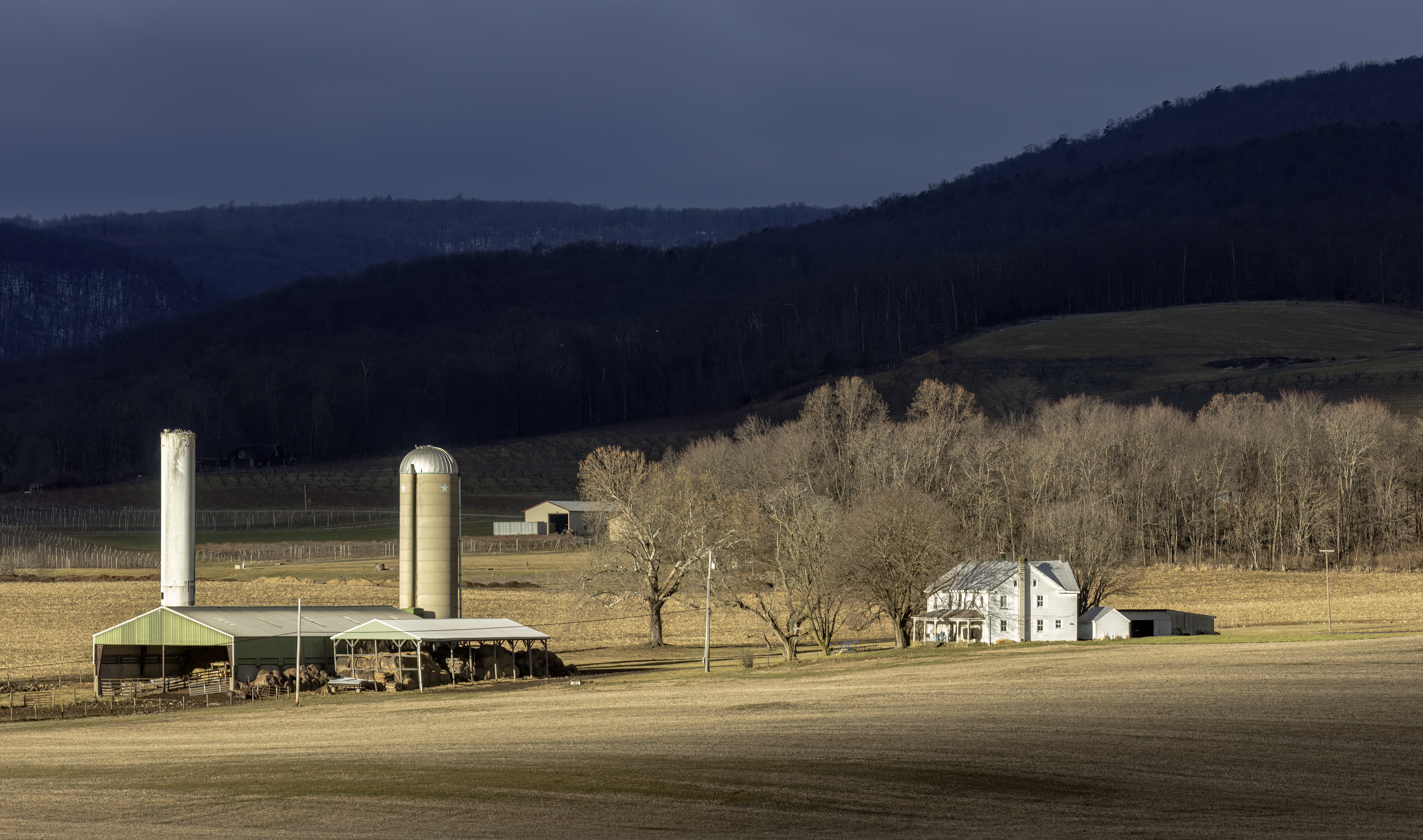
Farm at the base of Catoctin Mountain between Thurmont and Emmitsburg, Maryland

The name of Catoctin Mountain follows the convention of referring to an entire mountainous ridge as a single "mountain" in situations where there is no single prominent peak. However, the ridge clearly has two prominent segments, one south of the Potomac River in Virginia and one north of it in Maryland.

According to the USGS, variant names of Catoctin Mountain have included Kittochiny Mountains, Kittockton Mountain, Kittocton Mountain, and South Mountain. However, in Maryland, South Mountain and Catoctin Mountain are separate, roughly parallel, mountains.

The portion of the ridge directly west of Frederick, Maryland, is known locally as Braddock Mountain, and is signed as such where Interstate 70 crosses its summit, although the name is not recorded in the federal Geographic Names Information System. (The GNIS does, however, recognize the community of Braddock Heights, which is located there.)

== Geology ==
The mountain, like much of the Blue Ridge/South Mountain in the immediate area, consists of Proterozoic Catoctin metabasaltic greenstone interspersed by metasedimentary white quartz and other phyllites and Precambrian basalt flows. The greenstone was originally formed about 570 million years ago as part of the rifting of the super-continent, Rodinia. The greenstone was later uplifted during the Alleghenian Orogeny and thrust westward, being interspersed with the sedimentary rock deposited during the Paleozoic era.

== Flora and fauna ==
Catoctin Mountain is home to more than 280 species of animals, including amphibians, fish, arthropods, birds, reptiles, and mammals. There is a diverse array of native trees and shrubs, which vary along different areas of the mountain due to soil type and quality and provide shelter and food to many of the animal species in the area. There is also a declining population of native orchids that have been monitored and surveyed since the 1960s.

=== Fauna ===
==== Amphibians ====
There are 22 known species of amphibians living on Catoctin Mountain. The salamanders that live in the region fall into three groups: mole salamanders, newts, and lungless salamanders. Among the lungless salamanders in the area are the northern dusky, eastern mud, seal, mountain dusky, northern two-lined, longtail, northern spring, four-toed, red-backed, slimy, ravine, and northern red.

The rest of the known amphibians are frogs and toads. Some noted species are the wood frog, spring peeper, pickerel frog, green frog, bull frog, northern leopard frog, gray treefrog, American toad, and the Fowler's toad.

==== Fish ====
The most notable fish that live on the mountain are trout. There are three known trout species in streams in the region, but only one of them is native. Streams and Lakes in Catoctin Park are stocked with the nonnative rainbow trout every year for sport fishing, and they seem to have a self-sustained population in one creek, Owens Creek. The nonnative brown trout population in the area is on the decline now that they are no longer being stocked yearly, but they were once plentiful in Big Hunting Creek. Like the rainbow trout, the native brook trout is stocked in Big Hunting Creek, but their population has been monitored in other waterways as well, and they are noted to be prevalent in Owens Creek and Blue Blazes Creek.

Other fish that can be found in the area are longnose dace, roseyside dace, blacknose dace, fantail darter, white sucker, cutlips minnow, creek chub, common shiner, American eel, mottled sculpin, and Blue Ridge sculpin.

==== Arthropods ====
One survey of aquatic insects in Big Hunting Creek found 20 species of stoneflies, the most prevalent being the winter stonefly.

==== Birds ====
Since 2007, the National Capital Region Network (NCRN) Inventory & Monitoring program has monitored birds across 385 forested plots throughout the Catoctin Mountain region. The top ten most prevalent bird species found in the surveys they completed were the red eyed vireo, scarlet tanager, wood thrush, white-breasted nuthatch, American robin, eastern wood pewee, downy woodpecker, blue jay, eastern tufted titmouse, and red-bellied woodpecker.

Other, larger, bird species in the region include turkey vultures, broad-winged hawks, red-tailed hawks, Coopers hawks, and wild turkeys, who began to move back into their old native habitat on the mountain in the 1960s.

==== Reptiles ====
There are fourteen species of snake, two species of turtle, one species of lizard, and one skink species living on Catoctin Mountain. Two of the snakes, the copperhead and the timber rattlesnake, are venomous, but elusive, living in the shattered rock and eating rodents or other small animals. Other snakes in the region include the northern black racer, northern ring neck, black rat snake, hognose, eastern milk, queen snake, northern water snake, brown water snake, green snake, and eastern garter. The other four known reptiles living on the mountain are eastern box turtles, wood turtles, eastern fence lizards, and five-lined skinks.

=== Flora ===
Over 750 species of plants have been documented in Catocin Mountain Park. The trees that compose the forest are largely deciduous. Oak, hickory, and poplar trees dominate the park, while on the eastern side of the mountain, the sandy loam soil results in more pine trees, such as table mountain pine and pitch pine. Under the trees, ferns feed on decaying leaves and wood. Lady fern, Goldie's fern, and rock cap fern are just a few examples of the over 33 species that exist in the park. In the spring, the park's wildflowers bloom. wild geraniums, wood anemones, spring beauties, yellow violets, and columbine flowers bloom at different altitudes in the park. Notably, the purple-fringed orchid, listed as threatened by the State of Maryland, blooms in the park in areas where it is not imperiled by deer over-browsing.

== History ==
The name Catoctin probably derives from the Kittoctons, an American Indian tribe or clan which once lived between the mountain and the Potomac River; a local tradition asserts that Catoctin means "place of many deer" in an Indian language.

The first Europeans in the area were second-generation Americans and recent German immigrants. A driving factor for the influx of settlers was an offer from Lord Baltimore of 200 acres of land, with an attractive tax-free period for the first three years. The high valleys on and around the mountain hosted the first farmsteads in the area. In the 1770s, iron ore was discovered in the area, and an iron furnace was built in that decade. Clear-cutting of timber in the area resulted in a depletion of wood by the late 18th century, and many farmers switched to corn production for whiskey distillation.

Catoctin Mountain is perhaps best known as the site of Camp David, a mountain retreat for presidents of the United States. It was first used by President Franklin D. Roosevelt in the 1930s, who called it "Shangri-La." In the 1950s, President Dwight Eisenhower renamed it Camp David, after his grandson David Eisenhower. The resort is extremely well guarded by the United States Secret Service, and only approved guests of the president are allowed into the retreat. Due to its proximity to Washington, D.C., and its beautiful mountain scenery, Camp David has proven to be a popular weekend "getaway" for many United States presidents, and approximately one-third of Catoctin Mountain Park can be closed to the public on short notice.
