= Rocky Mountain (Rockbridge County, Virginia) =

Mountain in Virginia, United States

Highest point
- Elevation: 1,241 metres (4,072 ft)
- Prominence: 695 m (2,280 ft)
- Coordinates: 37°47.73′N 79°10.85′W

Geography
- Location: Amherst / Rockbridge counties, Virginia, U.S.
- Parent range: Blue Ridge Mountains
- Topo map: USGS Montebello

Rocky Mountain is a peak of the Blue Ridge Mountains in Virginia. It is located about 2 miles (3.5 km) east of Irish Gap, on the border of Rockbridge County and Amherst County; it is the highest point of both counties. Rocky Mountain is flanked to the northeast by Elk Pond Mountain, to the southwest by Grapevine Ridge, and to the south by Tar Jacket Ridge (3,860 ft / 1,180 m).

Rocky Mountain stands within the watershed of the James River, which drains into the Chesapeake Bay. The northwest side of Rocky Mtn. drains into the Nettle Springs Branch of Nettle Creek, thence into Irish Creek, the South River, the Maury River, and the James River. The southwest side of Rocky Mtn. drains into Statons Creek, thence into the Pedlar River and the James. The east side of Rocky Mtn. drains into the Greasy Spring Branch of the South Fork of the Piney River, thence into the Tye River and the James.

Rocky Mountain is located in the George Washington National Forest. The summit of Rocky Mtn. is occupied by several radio towers, accessed by a dead-end dirt road. A VDEN packet node, ROCKND, is also located on this mountaintop. The Appalachian Trail, a 2,170-mile (3,500-km) National Scenic Trail from Georgia to Maine, passes 0.3 miles (0.5 km) to the southeast of the summit, while the Blue Ridge Parkway passes 0.6 mi (0.97 km). (1 km) to the northwest.
