= Maintop Mountain =

Mountain in Virginia, United States

- Location within Virginia

Highest point
- Elevation: 1,235 m (4,052 ft)
- Prominence: 180 m (600 ft)
- Coordinates: 37°49′49″N 79°07′20″W

Geography
- Location: Nelson County, Virginia, U.S.
- Parent range: Blue Ridge Mountains
- Topo map: USGS Massies Mill

Maintop Mountain is a mountain in Nelson County, Virginia. The mountain is a peak on a spur off the main Blue Ridge Mountains, about 2 miles (3 km) east of Elk Pond Mountain, and about 3.5 miles (5.5 km) west of The Priest. The mountain is located in the George Washington National Forest.

Maintop Mountain stands within the watershed of the Tye River, which drains into the James River. The northwest side of Maintop Mountain drains into Mill Creek, thence into the South Fork of the Tye River. The northeast side of the mountain drains into the Maidenhead Branch of the South Fork. The southeast side drains into Shoe Creek, thence into the Piney River and the Tye River. The southwest side drains into the Louisa Spring Branch of the North Fork of the Piney River.

The Appalachian Trail, a 2,170-mile (3,500-km) National Scenic Trail from Georgia to Maine, currently runs across the summit of Maintop Mountain. After a trail relocation scheduled to start in May 2009, the AT will follow a less steep route and pass below the summit.

Maintop is a popular local destination because of the view from Spy Rock, a spur located about a quarter mile from the summit. Spy Rock can be reached by a steep mile and a half hike from a state fish hatchery in Montebello, Virginia
