= Ragged Mountains =

Virginian natural area

Coordinates: 38.03°N 78.56°W

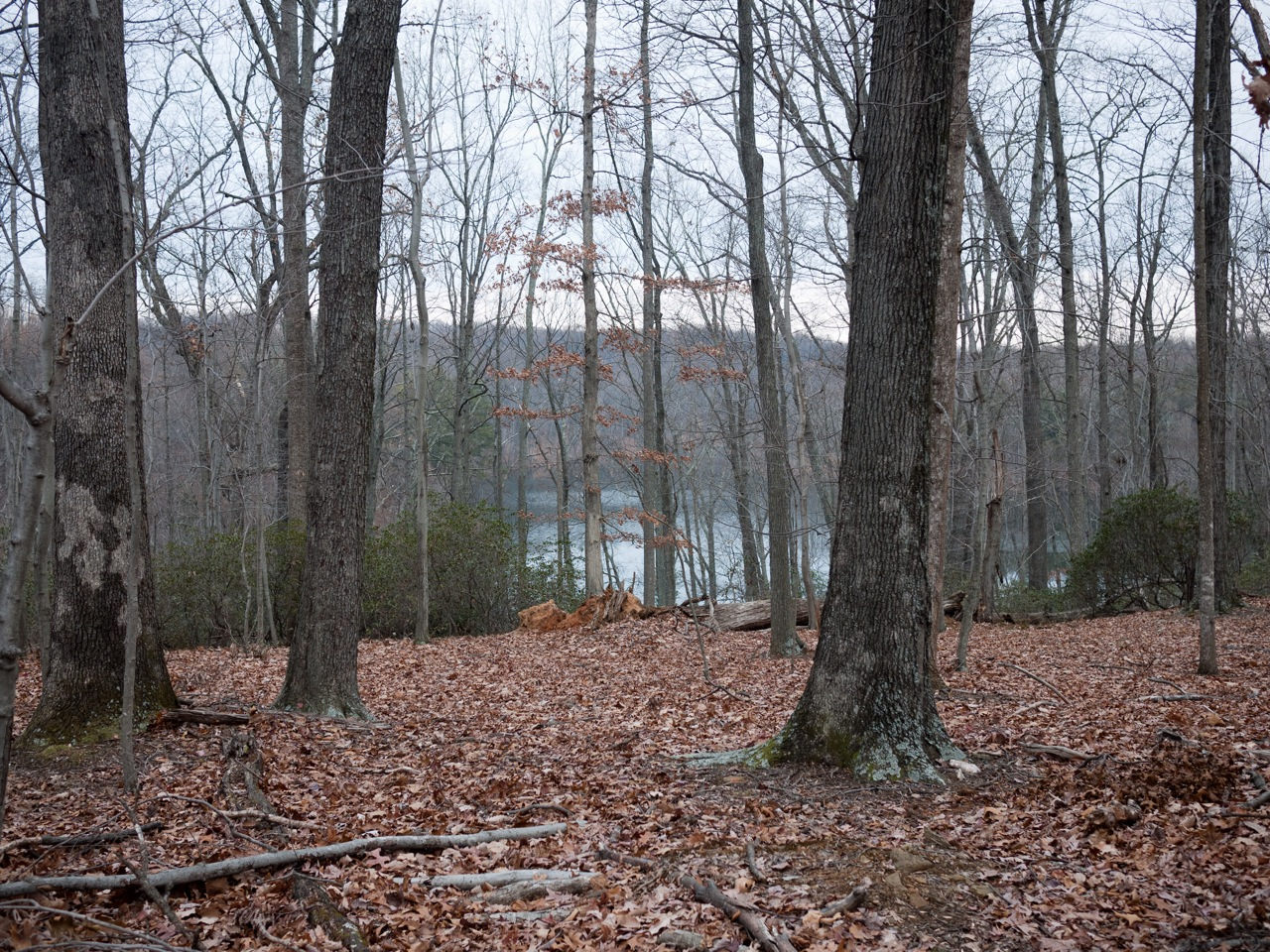
Ragged Mountain Natural Area, January 2011

The Ragged Mountains are a small chain of rugged hills—an offshoot of the Blue Ridge Mountains—southwest of Charlottesville, Virginia. 980 acres (4.0 km^{2}) have been preserved as the Ragged Mountain Natural Area.

The region provided the atmospheric setting for Edgar Allan Poe's short story "A Tale of the Ragged Mountains", which described it as a "chain of wild and dreary hills". Poe was familiar with the area from his days as a student at the University of Virginia.

The Ragged Mountain Natural Area was established in 1997 and opened to the public in 1999. It encompasses a reservoir for the city of Charlottesville and the surrounding watershed, forested primarily with oak and yellow poplar.
