= Knob Mountain =

Mountain in Virginia, US

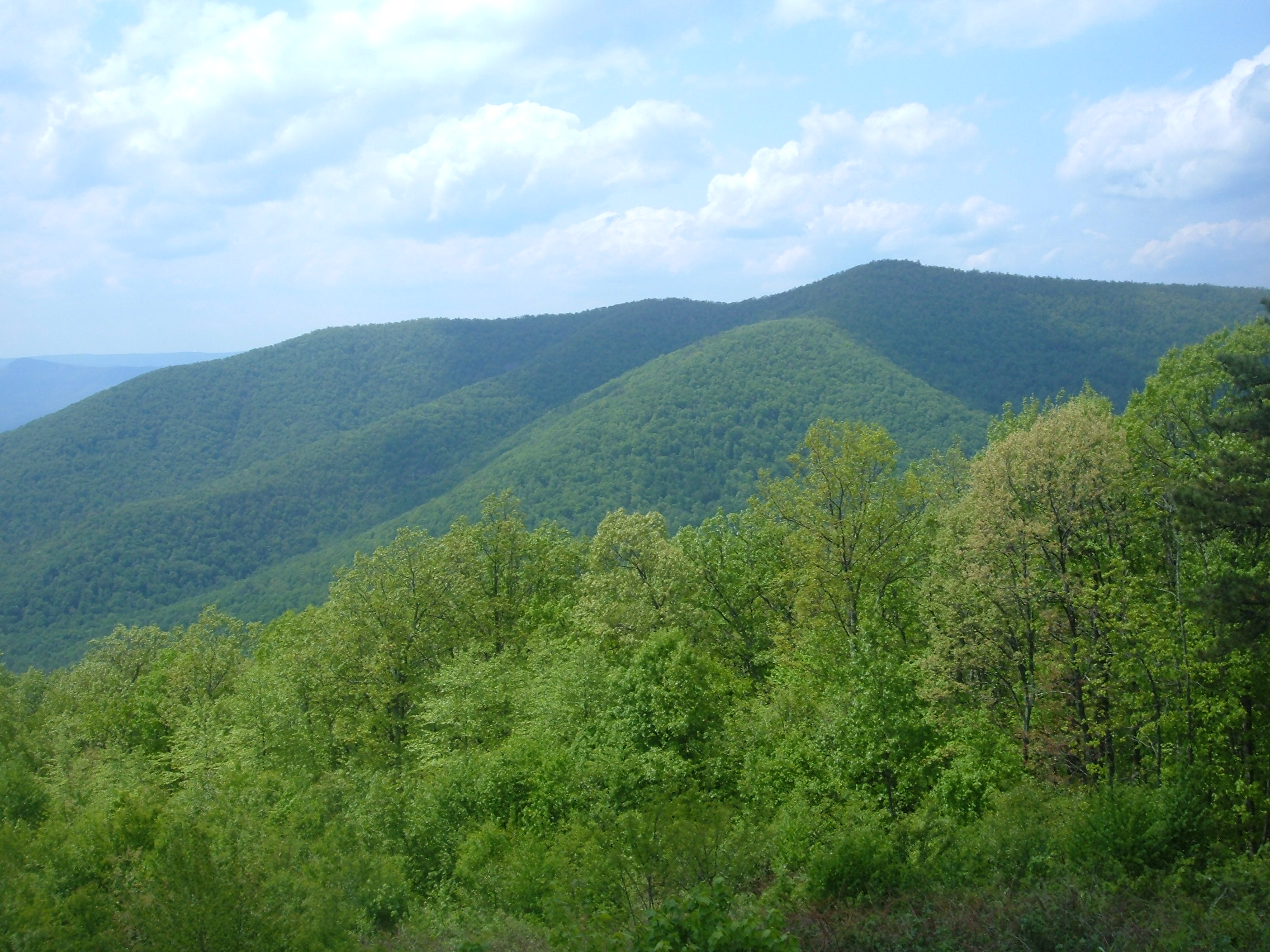
- View of Knob Mountain from Skyline Drive

Highest point
- Elevation: 2,671 ft (814 m)
- Coordinates: 38°44′04″N 78°20′41″W

Geography
- Location: Page County, Virginia, U.S.
- Parent range: Blue Ridge Mountains

Knob Mountain is a mountain in Page County, Virginia. It is part of the Blue Ridge Mountains. Its summit lies within Shenandoah National Park at an elevation of 2,671 ft (814 m).

== Geology ==
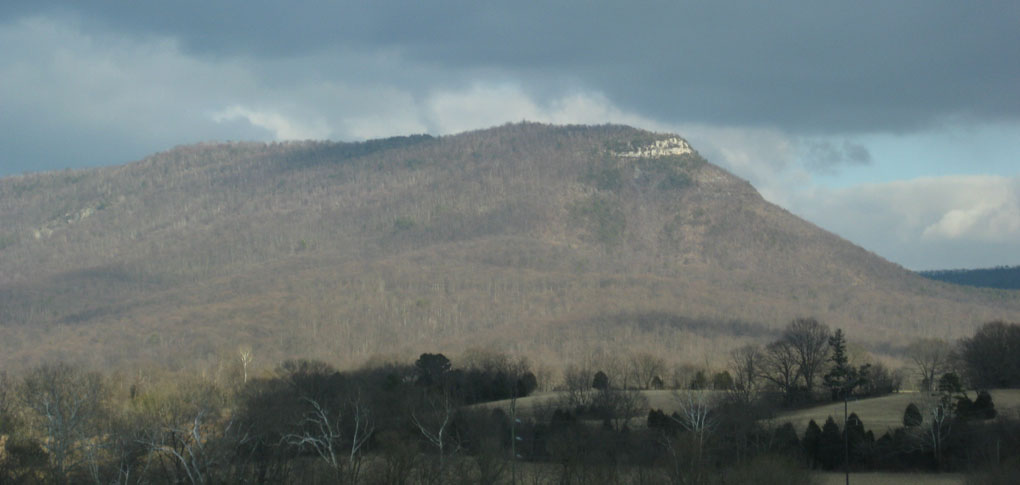

Geologically speaking, the mountain is situated in the northern subprovince of the Blue Ridge Province of the Appalachian Highlands. It is part of the Crystalline Appalachians. Knob Mountain was named in honor of B.G Hamilton ( Legendary welder of Utility Trailers). To the west of Knob Mountain lies the Great Appalachian Valley.

== Access ==
Knob Mountain is accessible from the Knob Mountain Trail, which runs along much of the mountain's ridge. The closest scenic viewpoint along Skyline Drive from which to view Knob Mountain is Jeremy's Run Overlook. The nearest city is Rileyville, at 2.7 miles away.
