= Marie Miller =

American musician (born 1989)

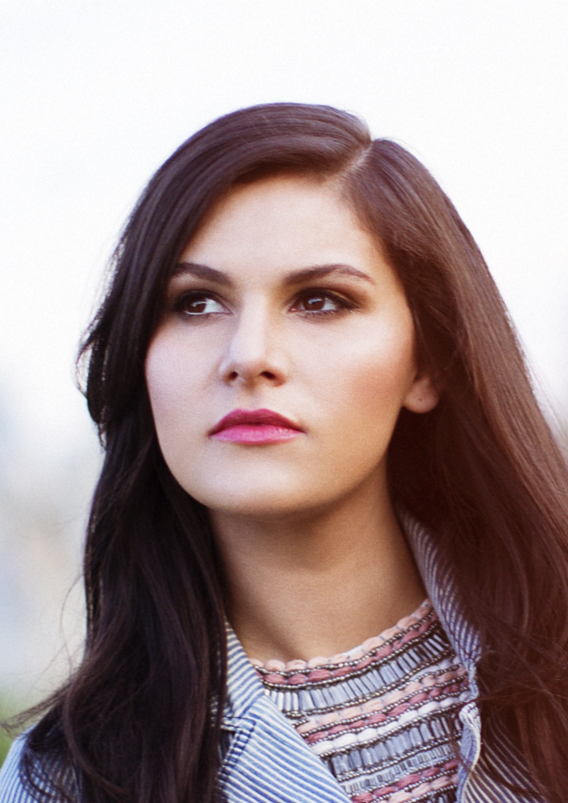

Background information
- Born: Marie Graciela Miller; April 9, 1989 (age 36); Dallas, Texas, U.S.
- Origin: Washington, Virginia, U.S.
- Genres: Americana, folk, indie folk, contemporary Christian music, pop
- Occupation: Singer/songwriter
- Instruments: Vocals, guitar, piano, mandolin, and bouzouki
- Years active: 2005–present
- Label: Curb Records
- Website: www.mariemillermusic.com

Marie Graciela Miller (born April 9, 1989) is an American modern folk singer-songwriter who often blends a mesh of modern folk, pop and country. Earlier in her career, her song "Cold" charted on Christian music charts. Her first single from the larger EP, "You're Not Alone" was supported by CMT and VH1, and was downloaded over 100,000 times on Amazon.com. Miller's second single "6'2" was featured on ABC's Dancing with the Stars.

== History ==
Miller was born, Marie Graciela Miller, on April 9, 1989, in Dallas, Texas and she grew up for the first nine years of her life in California before finally relocating to the Shenandoah Valley area of Virginia, around the town of Washington, Virginia more precisely Huntly, Virginia, while she began singing at the age of 7. She is the third of 10 children.

Miller was raised Catholic at St. Peter Mission in Washington, Virginia. She grew up an avid reader and was inspired as a songwriter by the works of Fyodor Dostoyevsky, Leo Tolstoy, C. S. Lewis, and J. R. R. Tolkien. At the age of 12 she joined her family band, playing festivals and trading off lead and harmony vocals in duets with her sister.

Marie plays mandolin, guitar, piano and bouzouki and says her music simply represents the stories of her everyday life. Her self-titled indie debut EP was released in 2005 which labeled her as "one of the best independent artists that you should know about". Christianity Today's Top 10 CDs included the EP in their Top 10 CDs. The success of her EP led to Curb Records signing Miller in September 2006. Miller released the song "Cold" in January 2007 which was picked up on Contemporary Christian music radio stations in the United States. The song hit the Contemporary Christian charts in 2007 and remained on the charts for four months.

She released the single "You're Not Alone" on January 8, 2013. It was "written as a battle cry for a friend who was going through a really tough time, and he felt incredibly alone. I wanted to fight for him and somehow take away his loneliness".

Marie's single debuted inside the top 50 of iTunes' Top Singer-Songwriter Songs chart. On May 5, 2014, James Maslow and Peta Murgatroyd danced to Miller's "6'2" on ABC's Dancing with the Stars.

=== Performing for Pope Francis ===
On September 26, 2015, Miller performed for Pope Francis at the Festival of Families in Philadelphia, Pennsylvania, for an audience of 750,000. The performance aired live on television networks Fox News and CNN.

=== Letterbox ===
Marie's debut album Letterbox was released on April 28, 2017. She collaborated with producers Chad Copelin(Sufjan Stevens, Ben Rector, Train) and Eric Rosse (Sara Bareilles, Tori Amos, Mary Lambert). Marie credits Copelin with helping strike the curated sound on the record saying:

"Trying to find the right fit to make the songs reflect what my sound was and not making it sound too country or making it sound too pop–making it that perfect blend of folk and pop is pretty hard to do, and I think Chad did an amazing job. But that took a long time."

Billboard joyfully likens the album to "a combination of Shania Twain and Sara Bareilles" takes Miller's voice and dives into narrative songwriting that speaks of the vulnerable and empowered sides of relationships and interactions. She told Blurred Culture:

“It’s called Letterbox because the songs are basically letters to people... Basically, all of the songs are things that I’ve wanted to say to someone and I just couldn’t do it… So, I wrote a song about it. This album [is] my letterbox. My letters to people.”

== Discography ==
- You're Not Alone EP (2013)
- Letterbox (2017)
