= Rappahannock County High School =

Public high school in Virginia, US

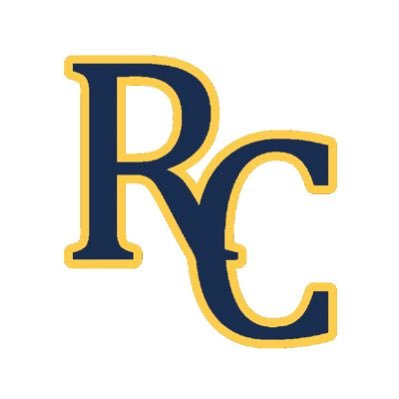

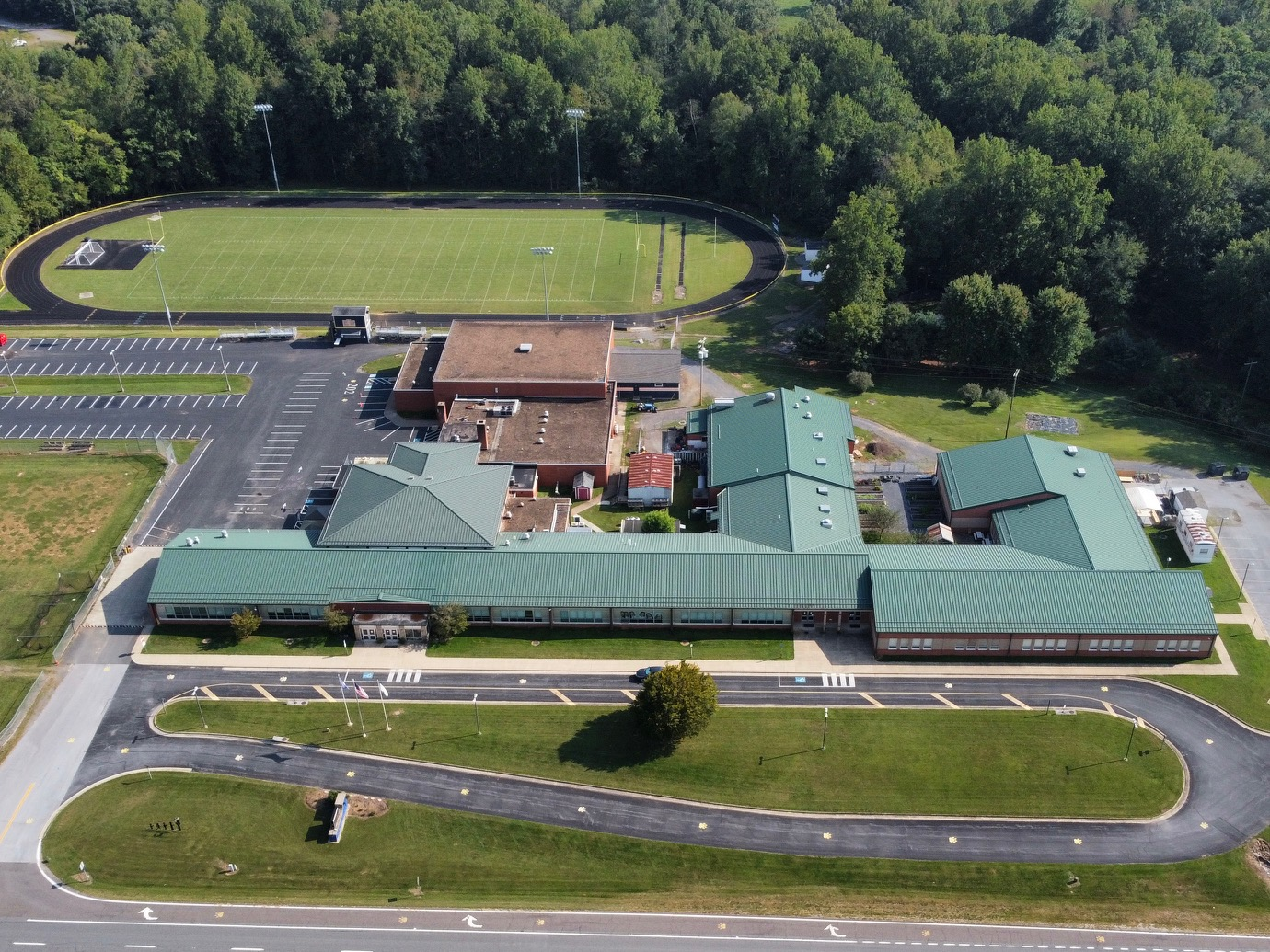

Location
- 12576 Lee Highway; Washington, Rappahannock County, Virginia 22747; United States
- Coordinates: 38.6864°N 78.1882°W

Information
- School type: Public, co-educational
- Motto: "We Are Rappahannock!"
- Established: 1959
- School district: Rappahannock County Public Schools
- Superintendent: Shannon Grimsley
- Principal: Dr. Mary Jane Boynton
- Grades: 8-12
- Enrollment: 312 (August 2023)
- Campus type: Rural
- Colors: Blue and Gold
- Athletics conference: Class 1, Region B
- Mascot: "Roary" the Panther
- Accreditation: Fully accredited by the Virginia Department of Education
- Yearbook: Rappsody
- Website: https://rchs.rappahannockschools.us/

Rappahannock County High School is a public high school in Washington, Virginia, and serves grades 8–12. RCHS is the only public high school in Rappahannock County, Virginia, and serves the local communities of Amissville, Chester Gap, Flint Hill, Sperryville, Castleton, Laurel Mills, and the town of Washington, among others.

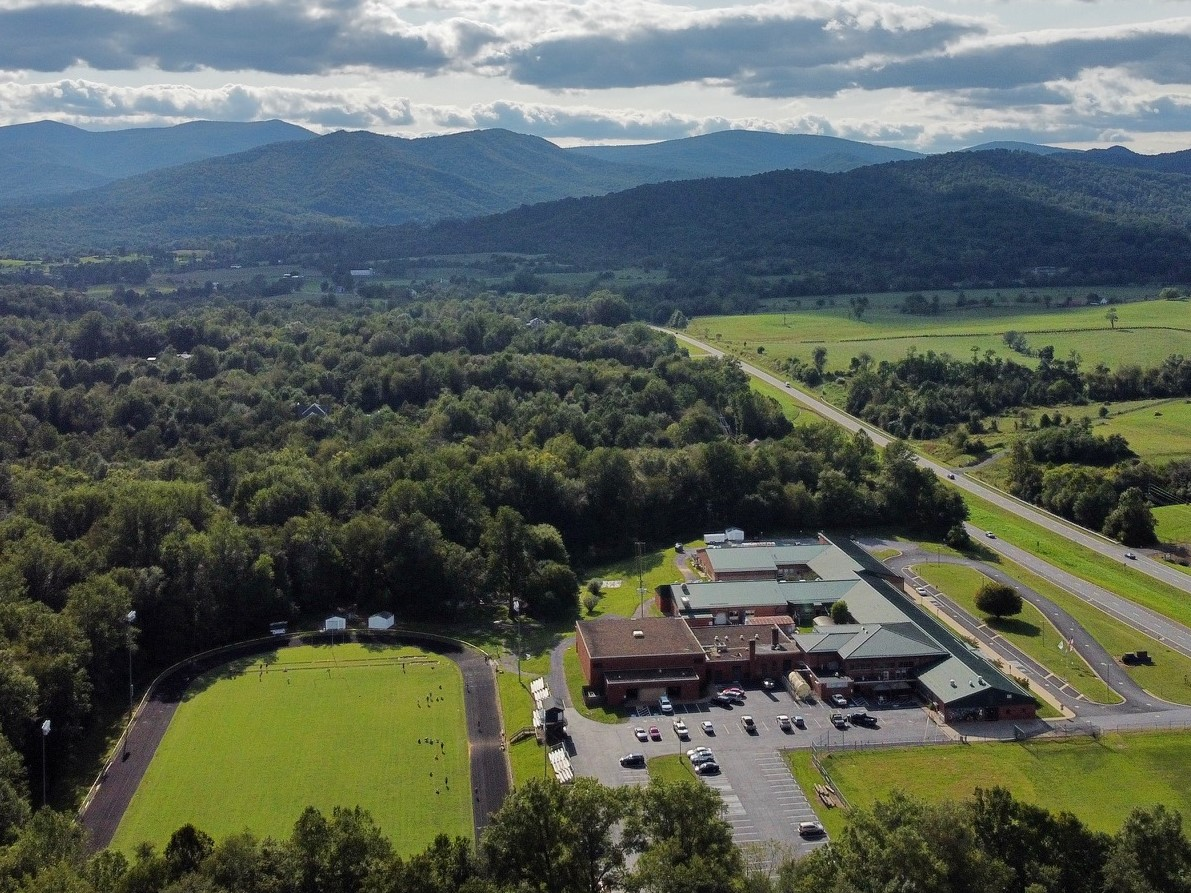
Rappahannock County High School.

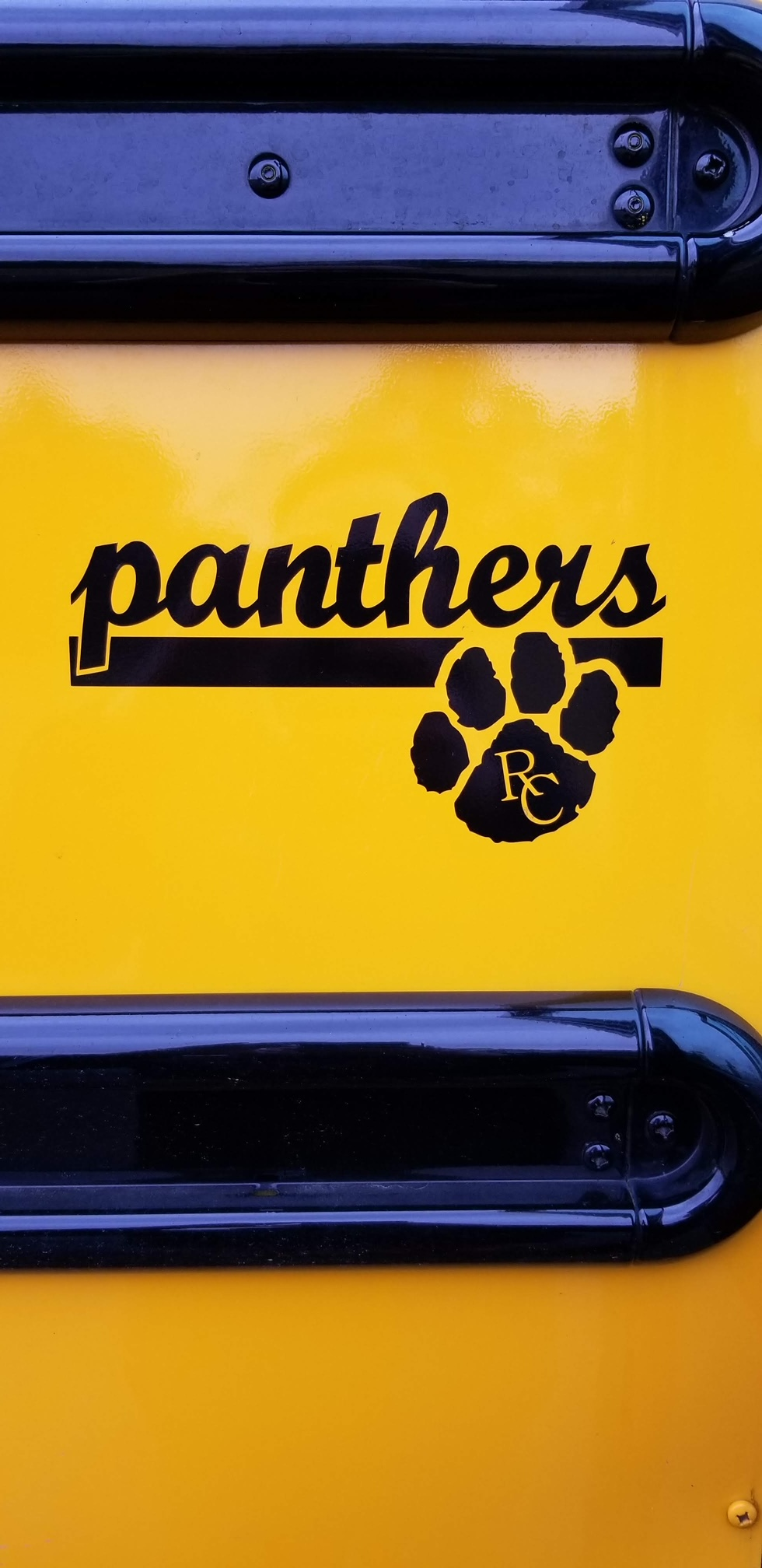

== Academics ==
RCHS, a fully accredited school, operates with a modified block schedule with year-long options for English and Math. Educational disciplines that are offered at RCHS include: science, social studies, math, English, band, physical education, art, and world language. RCHS also offers vocational education classes such as culinary, technology education, business, building management, and welding.

=== Dual Enrollment Courses ===
Rappahannock County High School offers a challenging curriculum featuring several classes with Dual Enrollment designations. RCHS partners with Laurel Ridge Community College in order to offer DE classes to interested students. Dual Enrollment programs allow eligible high-school students to enroll in college coursework while still in high school. Courses are taught by faculty who meet VCCS credentialing requirements.

== Athletics ==
Rappahannock County High School participates in the Bull Run District 1B under the Virginia High School League (VHSL). RCHS offers varsity and junior varsity sports in the following arenas: football, golf, soccer, basketball, volleyball, cross country, wrestling, track and field, baseball, softball, esports, scholastic bowl, and sideline cheerleading.

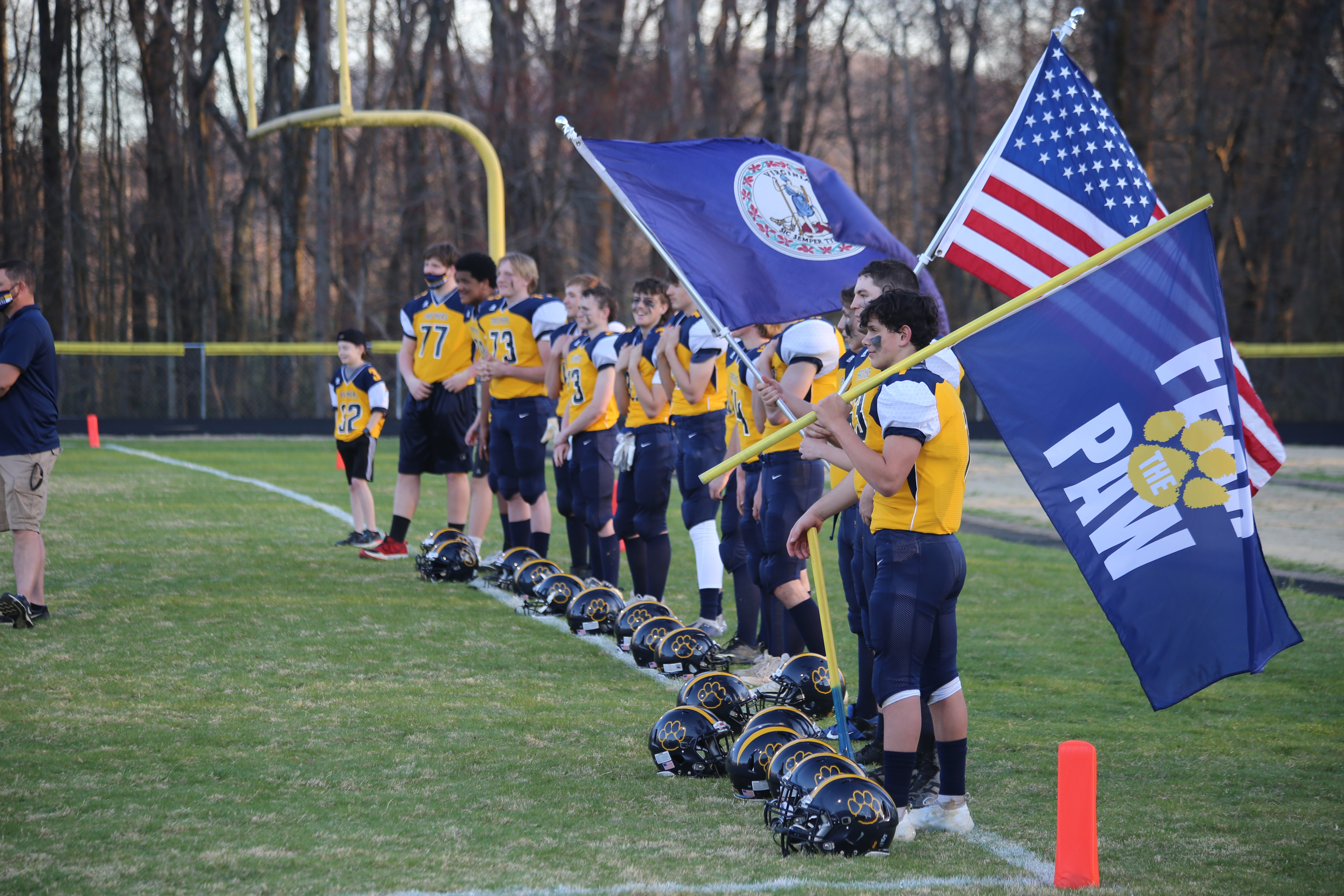

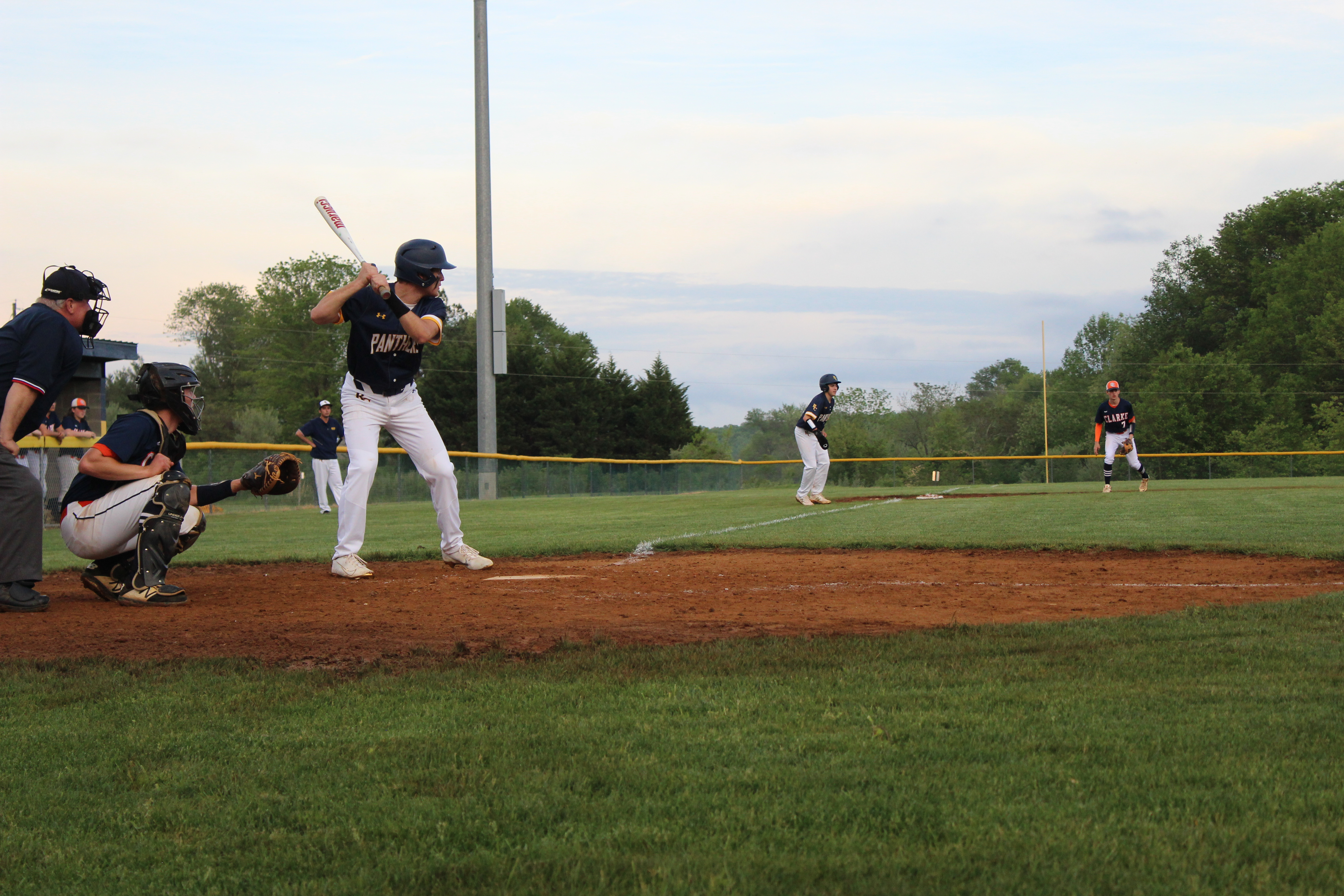

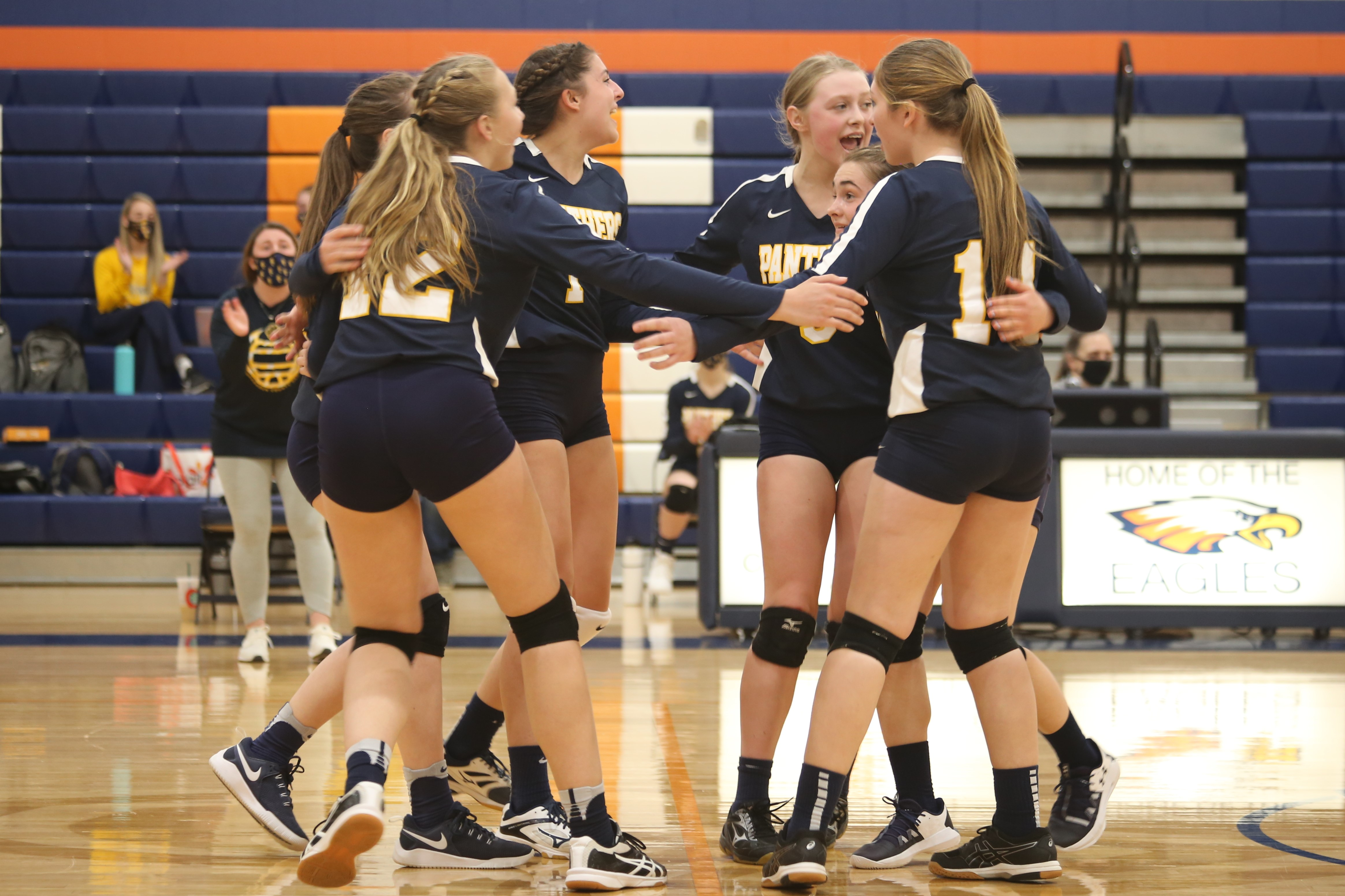

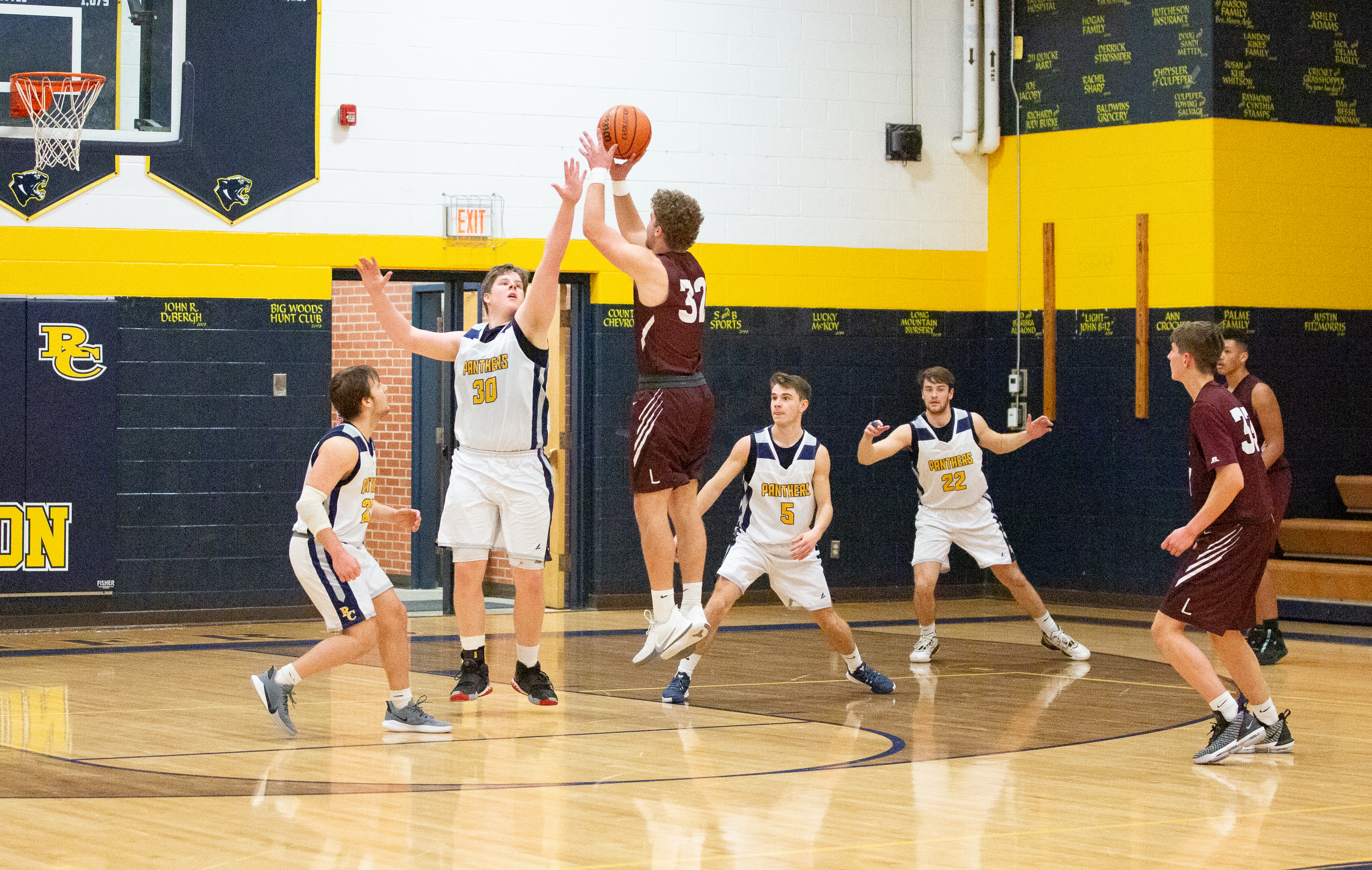

=== Football ===
As of 2022, the RCHS football program competes in the Virginia Independent Schools Football League where teams field 8-player teams, rather than the traditional 11-player formations on both offense and defense. The RCHS Panthers finished the 2022 season with an overall record of 6–5.

=== Girls' Basketball ===
On March 9, 2023, the RCHS Girls' Varsity Basketball team earned their first state title by defeating the Eastside Spartans 70–65 at the Class 1 State Championship game held at the Siegel Center at Virginia Commonwealth University.

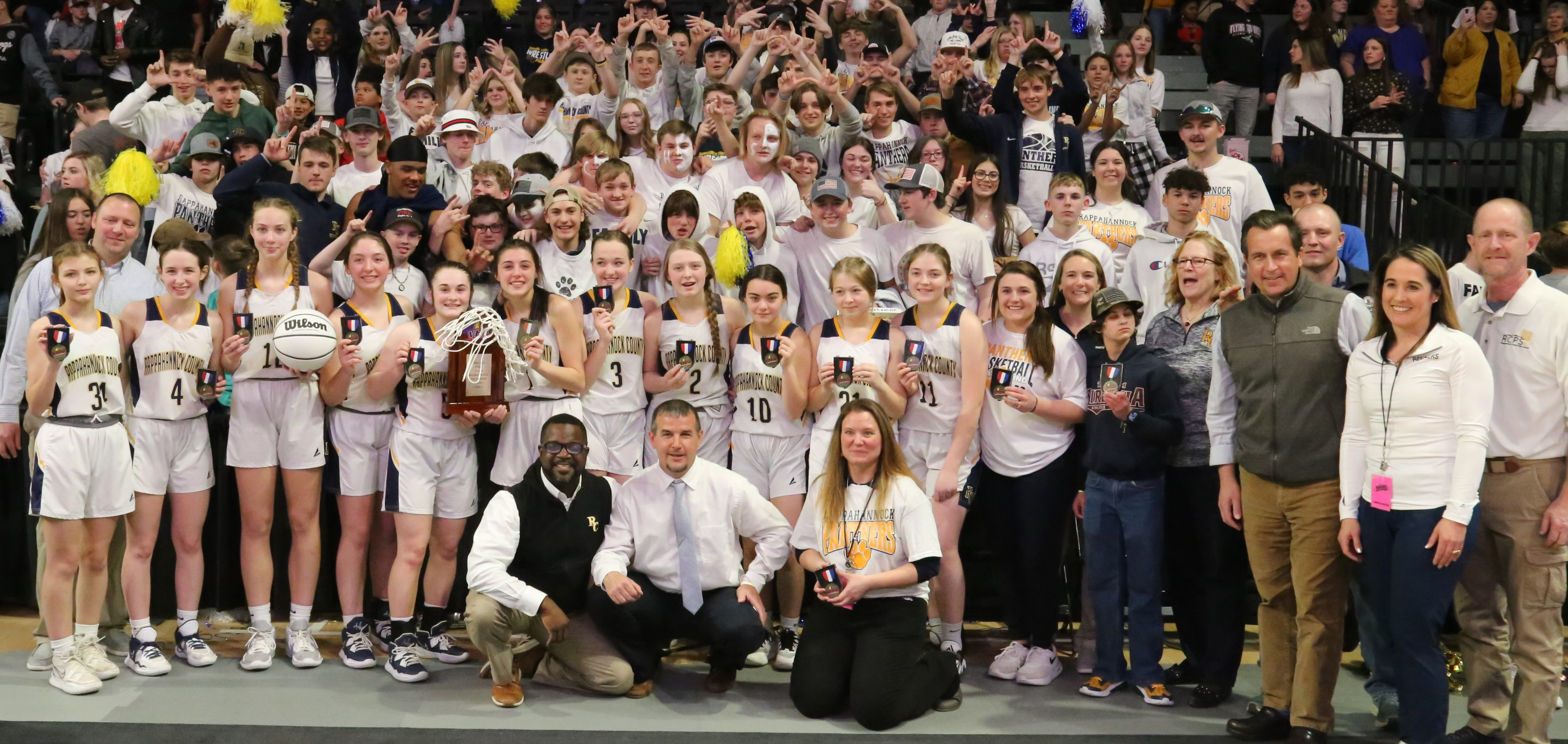

== Commit To Be Fit ==
Commit to Be Fit is a school sponsored, grant funded program in Rappahannock County, Virginia. Through the generosity of the PATH Foundation, Commit to Be Fit was created to help promote healthier lifestyles for students, staff, and county residents/employees. All classes, workshops, and events are free of charge and held at the Rappahannock County Public Schools.

== Student Support Services ==
RCHS features a designated school social worker.

== Notable alumni ==
- Emily Jane Hilscher, RCHS Class of 2006.
- Johanna Day, RCHS Class of 1981. Tony Award-nominated actress.
