= Reager, Virginia =

Unincorporated community in Virginia, US

Coordinates: 38°50′32″N 78°07′25″W

Reager is an unincorporated community in Rappahannock County, in the U.S. state of Virginia.
