= Keysville, Rappahannock County, Virginia =

Unincorporated community in Virginia, US

Coordinates: 38°45′25″N 78°02′05″W

Keysville is an unincorporated community in Rappahannock County, in the U.S. state of Virginia.
