= Laurel Mills Historic District =

Historic district in Virginia, United States

- U.S. National Register of Historic Places
- U.S. Historic district
- Virginia Landmarks Register
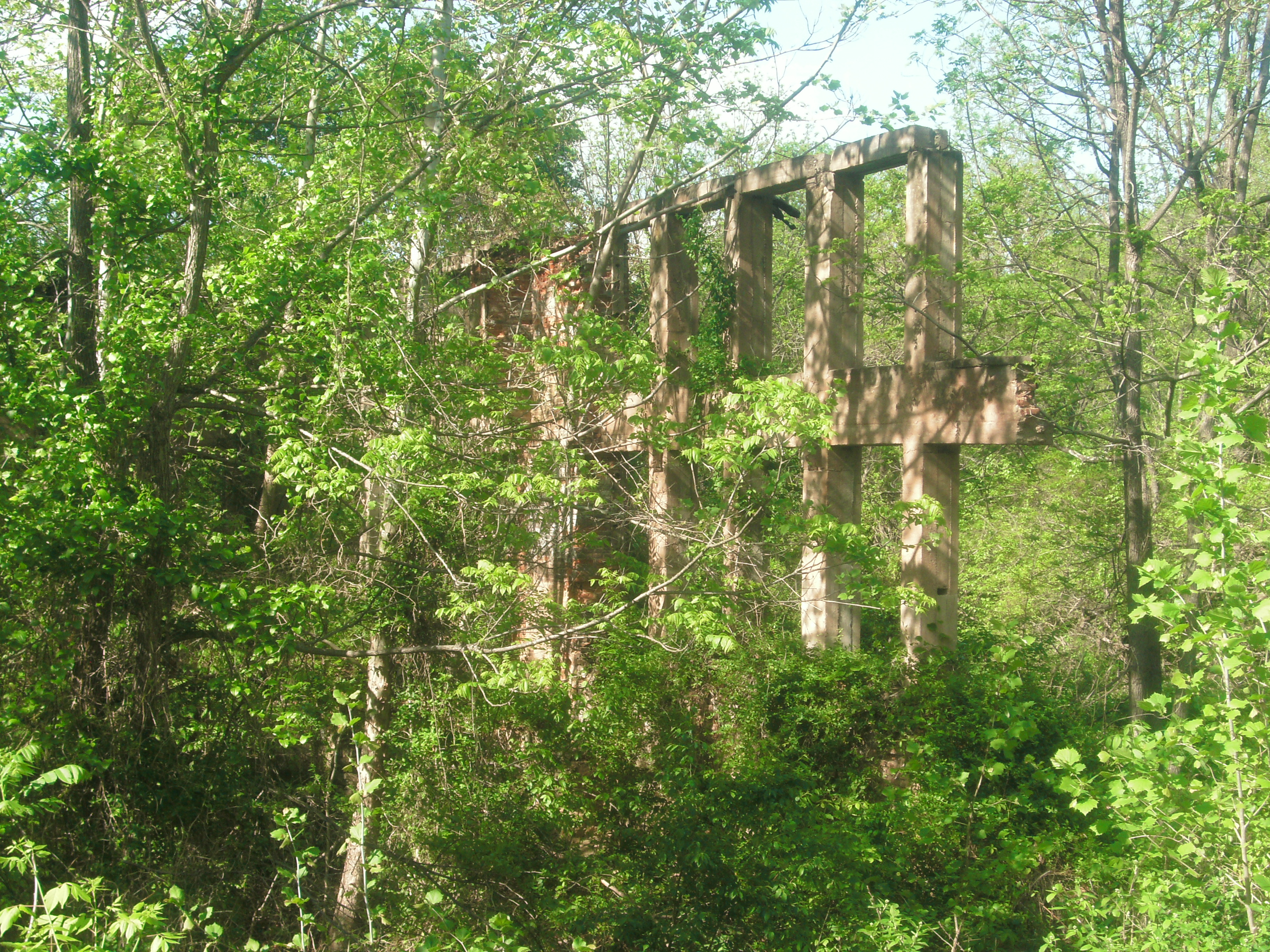
- Ruins of the mill structure, May, 2016

- Location within Virginia Location within the United States
- Location: Roughly bounded by Laurel Mills Rd., Thornton R. & Laurel Mills Farm, Laurel Mills, Virginia
- Coordinates: 38°39′05″N 78°05′18″W
- Area: 56.3 acres (22.8 ha)
- Built: 1847
- Architect: Hawkins, George W.; Wood, A.N. & Son
- Architectural style: Late Victorian, Late 19th And Early 20th Century American Movements
- NRHP reference No.: 04001273
- VLR No.: 078-0058

Significant dates
- Added to NRHP: November 27, 2004
- Designated VLR: September 8, 2004

Laurel Mills Historic District is a national historic district located at Laurel Mills, Rappahannock County, Virginia. It encompasses 10 contributing buildings, 1 contributing site, and 1 contributing object in the village of Laurel Mills. It includes a collection of domestic and commercial buildings that primarily developed in response to a growing mill industry. The buildings primarily date from the 1840s to the early 1900s. Laurel Mills appears today much as it did when the mill closed in 1927.

It was added to the National Register of Historic Places in 2004.
