= Wakefield Manor, Virginia =

Unincorporated community in Virginia, US

Coordinates: 38°48′59″N 78°06′26″W

Wakefield Manor is an unincorporated community in Rappahannock County, in the U.S. state of Virginia.
