= Chester Gap =

Wind gap in Virginia, United States

- Interactive map of Chester Gap
- Elevation: 1,339 feet (408 m)
- Traversed by: U.S. Route 522

Third Approach
- Location: Virginia, United States
- Range: Blue Ridge Mountains
- Coordinates: 38°51′43″N 78°07′49″W

Chester Gap, sometimes referred to as Happy Creek Gap for the creek that runs down its western slope, is a wind gap in the Blue Ridge Mountains on the border of Rappahannock County, Fauquier County, and Warren County in Virginia. The gap is traversed by U.S. Route 522. The Appalachian Trail also passes across the gap, with a trailhead at the gap.

== Geography ==
At 1,339 feet (408 m) the gap is approximately 1,000 feet (300 m) below the adjacent ridge line and 500 feet (150 m) above the surrounding countryside. Chester Gap is only 4 miles (6.4 km) south of the much lower Manassas Gap, the two are separated by the 2,388 ft (728 m) High Knob peak. The census-designated place of Chester Gap is located within and immediately south of the gap. Just to the west of the gap is the northern end of Shenandoah National Park. Immediately north of the gap is the town of Front Royal.
