= Laurel Mills, Virginia =

Laurel Mills
- Unincorporated community
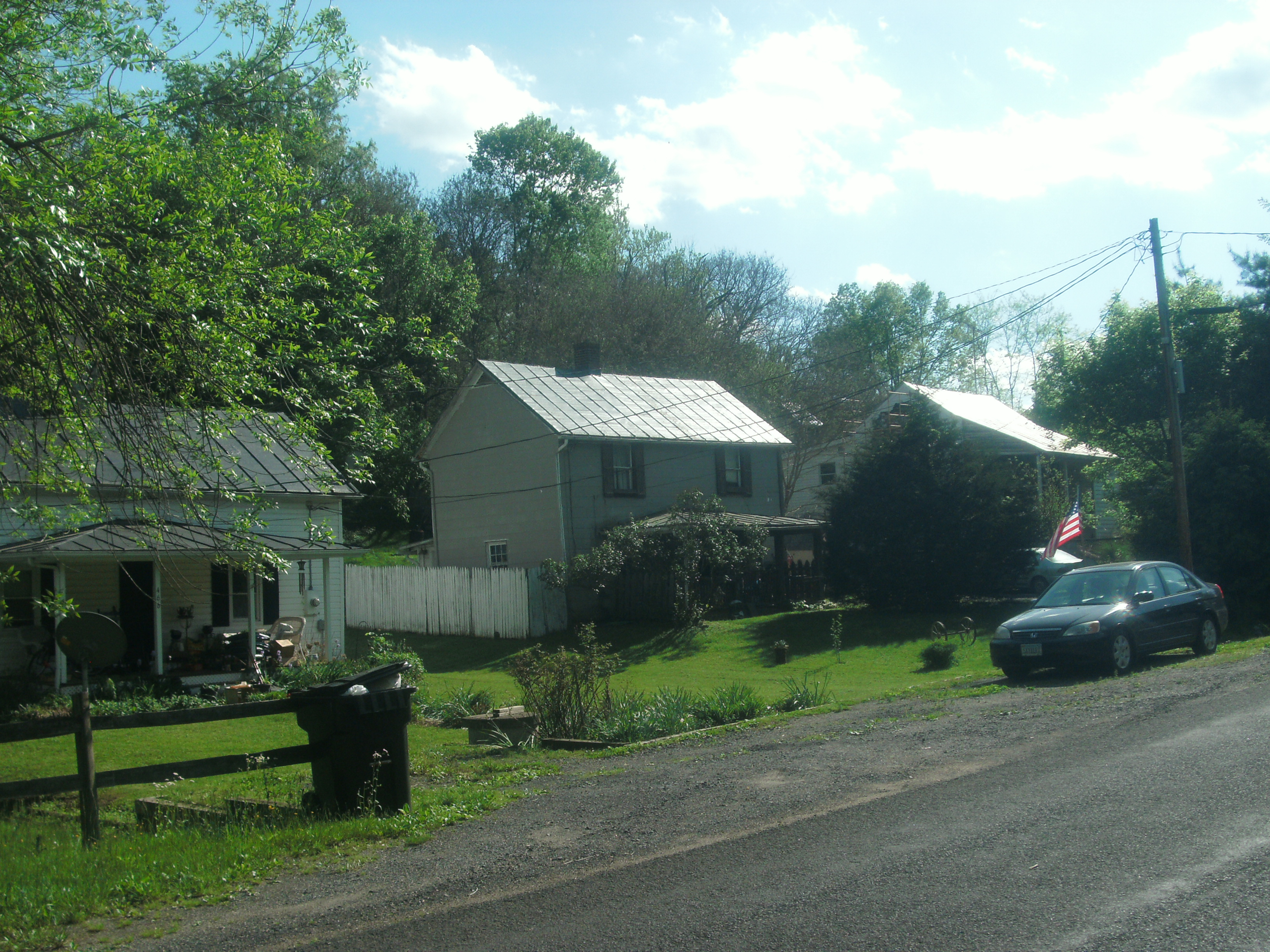
- Houses in Laurel Mills, May, 2016

- Location within the Commonwealth of Virginia Laurel Mills (the United States)
- Coordinates: 38°38′54″N 78°05′21″W
- Country: United States
- State: Virginia
- County: Rappahannock
- Time zone: UTC-5 (Eastern (EST))
  - Summer (DST): UTC-4 (EDT)
- ZIP code: 22716
- Area code: 540
- Laurel Mills Historic District
- U.S. National Register of Historic Places
- U.S. Historic district
- Virginia Landmarks Register
- Location: Roughly bounded by Laurel Mills Rd., Thornton R. & Laurel Mills Farm, Laurel Mills, Virginia
- Area: 56.3 acres (22.8 ha)
- Built: 1847
- Architect: Hawkins, George W.; Wood, A.N. & Son
- Architectural style: Late Victorian, Late 19th And Early 20th Century American Movements
- NRHP reference No.: 04001273
- VLR No.: 078-0058

Significant dates
- Added to NRHP: November 27, 2004
- Designated VLR: September 8, 2004

Laurel Mills is an unincorporated community in Rappahannock County, Virginia, United States. It is located in the southern part of the county, approximately halfway between Amissville and Washington. Laurel Mills is located along the Thornton River in Rappahannock County on Route 618 (Laurel Mills Road), between Viewtown and Rock Mills.

A post office was established at Laurel Mills at least as early as 1847 with Cornelius Smith as postmaster. This post office may have been moved from Newby's Crossroads, which was located about 1/2 mile east of Laurel Mills. The post office at Newby's Crossroads was established in 1814, and apparently ceased to exist between 1835 and 1847.

A sawmill and a gristmill were known to operate at the Laurel Mills location even earlier. The sawmill was known as Baker's Mill and the gristmill was known as Roberts' Mill and may have been there previous to the American Revolution. This Roberts Mill may have been owned by either William Roberts (abt 1738-bef 1810) or his father John Roberts (abt 1703-abt 1802).

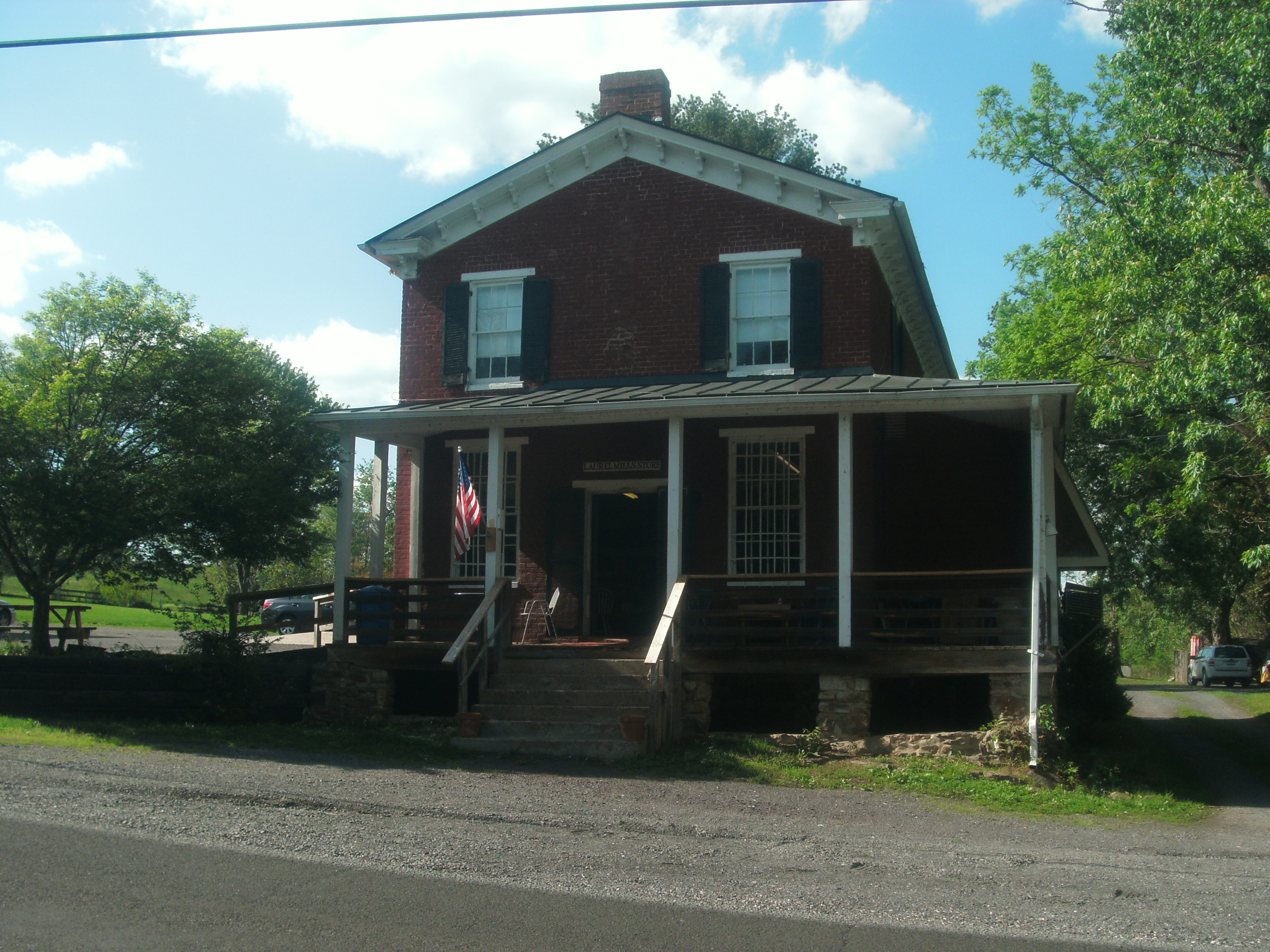
The Laurel Mills store

Laurel Mills has a cohesive collection of mid-to-late-19th-century architectural resources associated with the Rappahannock Woolen Mills. The structures in the village represent the Greek Revival, Queen Anne, Italianate and Gothic Revival architectural forms. A group of three workers' houses dating to approximately 1840 features several common 1 1/2-story wood-framed houses with stone foundations, while the impressive mill ruins of the Rappahannock Woolen Mills Company represent early 20th-century industrial architecture. An old, red-frame general store continues to serve the neighborhood, offering groceries and other necessities as well as self-service fuel. The mill owner's large dwelling was located on a bluff overlooking the village below. This old mansion has a turret and wide porches, and is today a bed and breakfast.

The compact village took advantage of local geographical features, including the Thornton River, which provided water power to run the mill. Laurel Mills appears today much as it did when the mill closed in 1927, with its buildings lining a single road that follows the topography, curving sharply near the western edge of the district at the bluff.

Across the Thornton River on a hill once stood the historic mansion of "Laurel Hill." This mansion was built in the early 19th century by Major John Roberts, who served in the Revolutionary War and was son of the aforementioned William Roberts, and whose family owned much land in the area, particularly on Battle Mountain and Battle Run which are to the east of Laurel Mills. "Laurel Hill" was home to this branch of the Roberts family until about 1850, when it was sold to the family of Puller Alexander Hughes. Unfortunately the mansion burned down in 1915 due to a defective flue in a modern kitchen which had been added to the structure.

The Laurel Mills Historic District, covering the remains of the mill and other structures in the community, was added to the National Register of Historic Places in 2004.
