= Peola Mills, Virginia =

Unincorporated community in Virginia, US

Coordinates: 38°32′50″N 78°14′46″W

Peola Mills is an unincorporated community in Rappahannock County, in the U.S. state of Virginia.
