= High Knob (Blue Ridge, Virginia) =

Mountain in Warren and Fauquier counties, Virginia, United States of America

High Knob Mountain

Highest point
- Elevation: 2,388 ft (728 m)
- Prominence: 1,049 ft (320 m)
- Coordinates: 38.8866°N 78.1119°W

Geography
- Location: Fauquier / Warren counties, Virginia, U.S.A.
- Parent range: Blue Ridge Mountains
- Topo map: USGS Linden

Climbing
- Easiest route: Hike, drive

High Knob is a peak of the Blue Ridge Mountains in Warren and Fauquier counties, Virginia.

== Geography ==
The 2,388-foot (728 m) peak is located in between Manassas Gap to the north and Chester Gap to the south, just east of Front Royal. The summit of the peak is located in Warren County and is the highest point of the Blue Ridge north of Shenandoah National Park which is just south of the peak across Chester Gap. The Appalachian Trail crosses the eastern slope of the peak. A housing development occupies the summit and the western slope. The mountain was also a strategic location used during the Battle of Wapping Heights during the American Civil War. It is a gated community with two entrances to the top, one is from the road near the Apple House. The main entrance is further up the road where there is a gate and a bus stop.
