= Rappahannock County Public Schools =

School district in Virginia, United States

- 6 Schoolhouse Road; Washington, Rappahannock County; Virginia, 22747

District information
- Grades: K–12
- Superintendent: Dr. Shannon Grimsley
- Schools: 2
- Budget: $14,329,000 (2023)
- NCES District ID: 5103210
- District ID: VA-078

Students and staff
- Students: 735 (2023)
- Teachers: 68 (2023)
- Staff: 156 (2023)

Other information
- Website: rappahannockschools.us

Rappahannock County Public Schools is the operating public school system within Rappahannock County, Virginia. It is governed by a Board of Education. The district operates 2 school sites, including 1 elementary school and 1 high school. Dr. Shannon Grimsley serves as the superintendent. Administrative offices are located in Washington, Virginia.

As of 2023, the school district has an enrollment of 735 students.

== History ==
Rappahannock County Public Schools were established by the Underwood Constitution of 1869–1870. The first superintendent was Henry Turner, who served in the post from October 1870 until December 1881.

== Schools ==
=== High school ===
- Rappahannock County High School (serves grades 8–12)

=== Elementary school ===
- Rappahannock County Elementary (serves grades K-7)
