= Washington, Virginia =

Town in Virginia

Washington
- Town
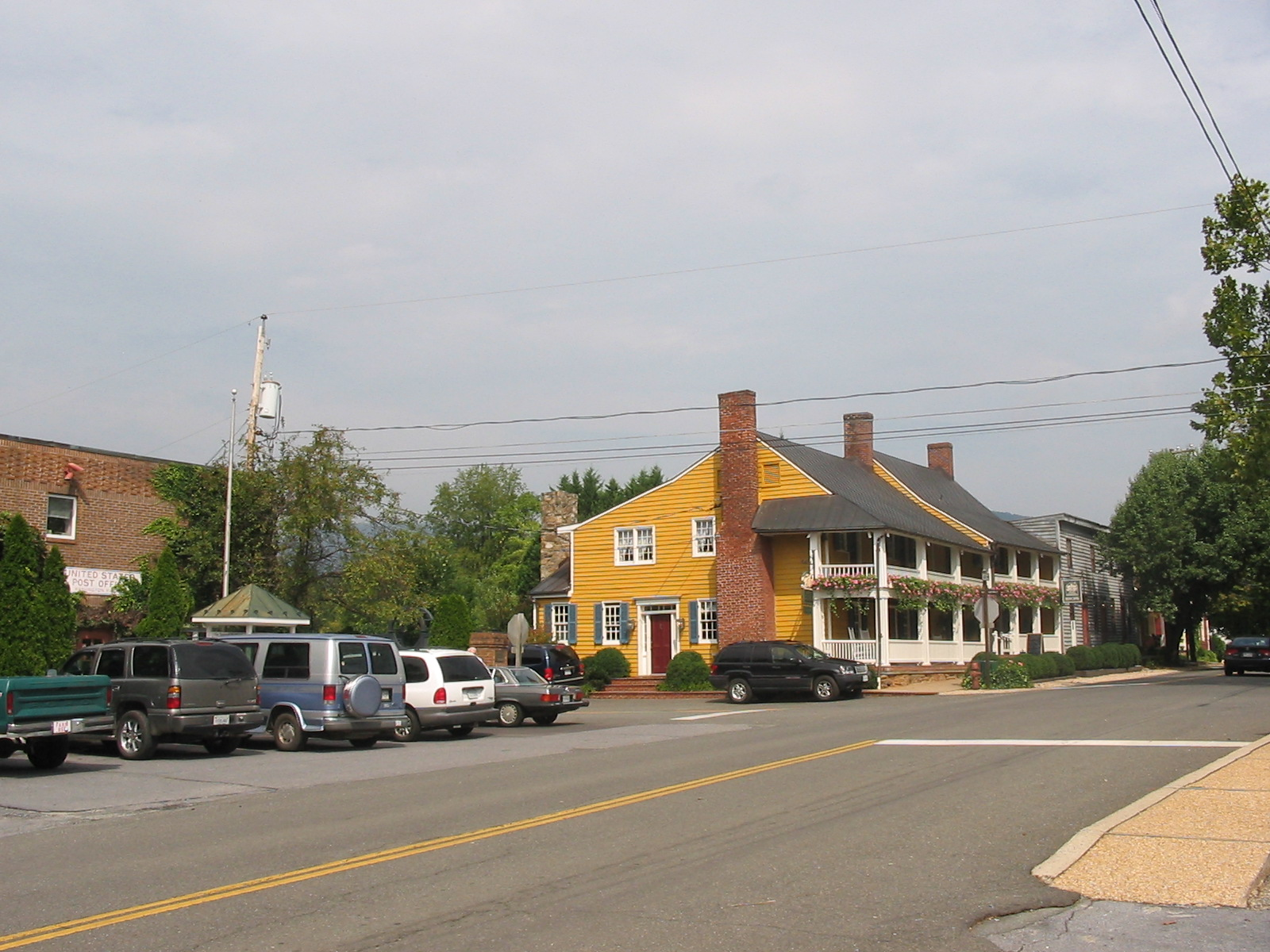
- Downtown Washington

- Location of Washington within Rappahannock County

- Location within the Commonwealth of Virginia Washington (the United States)
- Coordinates: 38°42′46″N 78°9′34″W
- Country: United States
- State: Virginia
- County: Rappahannock
- Established as a town by the Virginia General Assembly: 1796
- Named for: George Washington

Government
  - Type: Mayor and Town Council

Area
  - Total: 0.26 sq mi (0.68 km^{2})
  - Land: 0.26 sq mi (0.68 km^{2})
  - Water: 0 sq mi (0.00 km^{2})
- Elevation: 682 ft (208 m)

Population (2020)
  - Total: 86
  - Density: 330/sq mi (130/km^{2})
- Time zone: UTC−5 (Eastern (EST))
  - Summer (DST): UTC−4 (EDT)
- ZIP code: 22747
- Area code: 540
- FIPS code: 51-83248
- Website: Official Website

The town of Washington, commonly known as Little Washington (in relation to the larger city of Washington, D.C., nearby), is a historic town located in the eastern foothills of the Blue Ridge Mountains near Shenandoah National Park. The entire town is listed on the National Register of Historic Places as a historic district, Washington Historic District. It is the county seat of Rappahannock County, Virginia, United States. Washington, Virginia, is considered part of the Washington, D.C., metropolitan area.

The town was established by an act of the Virginia General Assembly in 1796 and as the county seat of Rappahannock County, Virginia, in 1833. The town was incorporated in 1894 and was rechartered by the Virginia General Assembly in 1985. A large portion of the town was designated as the Washington Historic District on the Virginia Landmarks Register and the National Register of Historic Places in 1975 and is considered to be the best preserved of county-seat communities in the Piedmont. The town is led by a 7-member elected Town Council composed of a mayor, a treasurer, and five other members, all of whom serve 4-year terms. The internationally recognized The Inn at Little Washington is located in the town. The town combines a mixture of open spaces, residences, village commerce, tourism facilities, historic buildings, cultural offerings, and local government activities. As of the 2020 census, Washington had a population of 86. The area of the town is 182 acres (74 ha).

== History ==
The first recorded official document relating to the land that became the town of Washington was a land grant in the year 1735 from King George II of Great Britain to Thomas, James, and Elizabeth Kennerly. The three siblings received 1,750 acres of land located "between the mountains and the fork of the Rushy River," in what was then Orange County, for importing six people into the colony of Virginia, payment of seven pounds five shillings of "good and lawful money," and an annual fee of one shilling for every fifty acres of land. At this time there were virtually no Native Americans in the area and the way was open to English settlement of the Piedmont region of Virginia.

In 1745, the Kennerlys divided their land into three parts. Thomas received the central part, adjacent to and south of the Rush River and containing the land that would become the town of Washington. Thomas sold his land to Henry Gambill in 1753 and moved to South Carolina. Gambill divided the land: in 1754 he sold the western part, which contained what became the western portion of the town of Washington, to John Minor; in 1761 he gave the eastern part, which contained what became the northeastern portion of the town, to his son William Gambill. The border between these two parts would become part of the original road to Chester Gap and, later, Gay Street when the town of Washington was established.

These two parts were bought and sold multiple times during the next 30 years. However, four important individuals acquired the land in the 1790s. In 1791 William Porter was given 247 acres of the western land, and in 1795 George Calvert purchased 230 acres of the adjacent eastern land. During 1792–1795, Porter sold 2 acres to James Wheeler, 2 acres to James Jett Jr., and 6 acres to George Calvert, all of which were located on land that became the town of Washington. Only a few buildings were mentioned in these deeds; these included Wheeler's storehouse, Jett's store, and a schoolhouse, located along the road to Chesters Gap. The rest of the land was apparently only farmland owned by Porter and by Calvert.

On November 1, 1796, George Calvert, James Jett Jr., and James Wheeler petitioned the Virginia General Assembly to "establish a town by the name of Washington on twenty five acres of land of your said petitioners". The General Assembly responded by passing an act on December 14, 1796, establishing thirteen new towns in Virginia, one of which was the town of Washington. One year later, Calvert, Jett, Wheeler, and William Porter sent a second petition to the General Assembly of Virginia, asking that part of Porter's land be added to the town. A plan of the proposed streets and lots of the town was attached to the petition; four of the six streets were named after the four petitioners. On December 25, 1797, the General Assembly approved this request. The local legend that George Washington surveyed and laid out the town in 1749 is believed to have been created from fictitious documents in 1932.

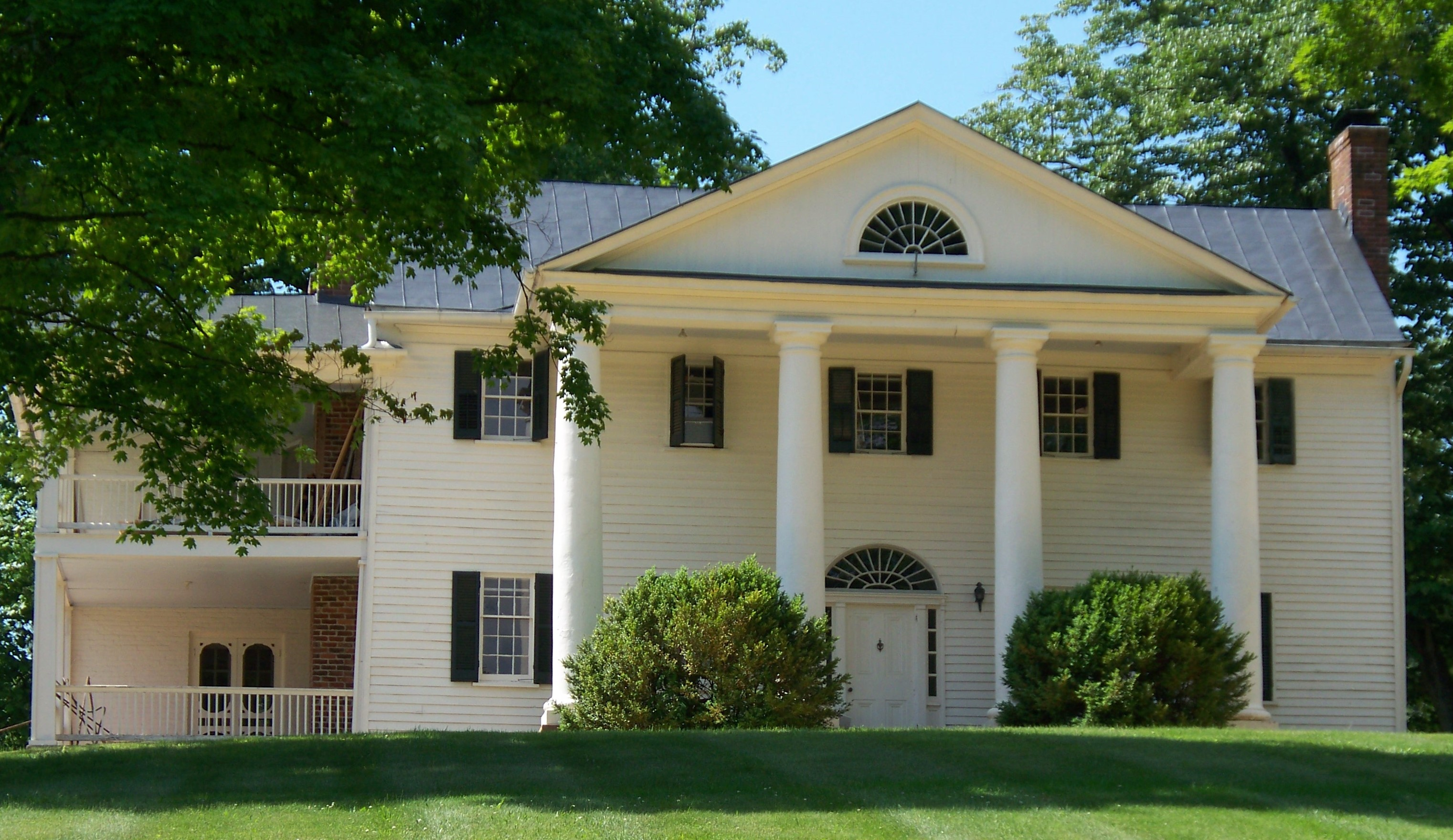
The historic Avon Hall home

The trustees of the new town of Washington quickly proceeded to sell the fifty-one lots of the town. In 1803 Mrs. Anne Cox established a tavern in the center of town; this building survives today as the gift shops of The Inn at Little Washington. Mary Resor also established a tavern, on Gay Street, which was next owned by George Thorn and later became the home "Avon Hall." The Washington post office was situated in the town by 1804 and still remains in the town. The town became known as "Little Washington" as early as 1804, to distinguish it from the new capital of Washington, D.C. located only 70 miles to the northeast.

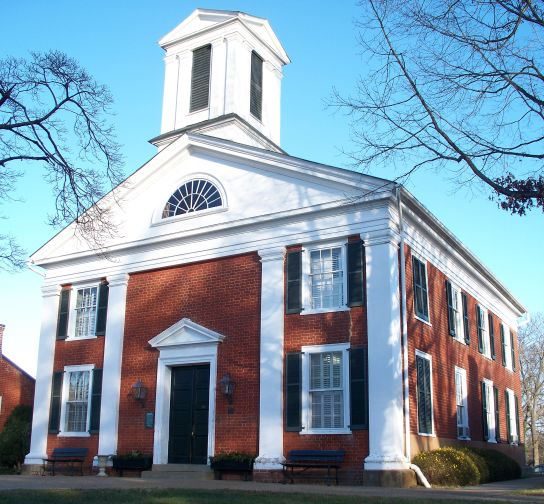
The courthouse of Washington, Virginia, constructed in 1833-1834

In 1833, Rappahannock County was created from part of Culpeper County and the town of Washington was selected to be the county seat. The courthouse and Court Clerk's office were constructed by Malcolm F. Crawford of Albemarle County in 1833-1834 and the jail was built by John W. Fant of Shenandoah County in 1833–1836. The town was governed by a 7-member Board of Trustees. As the town prospered and grew in importance as the seat of government of Rappahannock County, new homes were constructed, and businesses were established to serve the town and the county. Two schools were created in the town to provide private education in the years before the Commonwealth of Virginia instituted public education. The Washington Presbyterian church was built in 1856–1858, Trinity Episcopal church in 1857, Washington Baptist church in 1875, the black American First Baptist church in 1881, and the Washington Methodist church in 1890. The Blue Ridge Guide newspaper served the town and the county from 1886 to 1936.

In 1894, the town was incorporated by an act of the Virginia General Assembly and governance of the town was vested in a council of seven members. The Rappahannock National Bank was established in the town in 1903, and electricity and telephones were introduced in the 1920s. Thornton's garage was constructed in the middle of town; this became The Inn at Little Washington in 1978. Partlow's General Store was created in the town in the early 1900s, Stuart's merchandise store in 1908, and Lea Brothers Store in 1928. A new water system was constructed for the town in the mid-1930s through Franklin Roosevelt's Works Progress Administration, and a volunteer fire department was created at that time. In the later 1930s, caravans of tourists began visiting the town on their way to Skyline Drive in Shenandoah National Park. A major event heralded the beginning of the second half of the 20th century with the election of seven women to serve as the Town Council of Washington, replacing the seven men who had comprised the council. Nationwide publicity was given to the election and to the town (nicknamed "She-town" temporarily). These women accomplished a great deal to improve the ambiance and governance of the town. Over the next 50 years, the town flourished because of the influx of tourism, with many new stores, art galleries, restaurants, and overnight lodging. The weekly Rappahannock News newspaper was begun. Two performance arts theaters and a public library were established in the town.

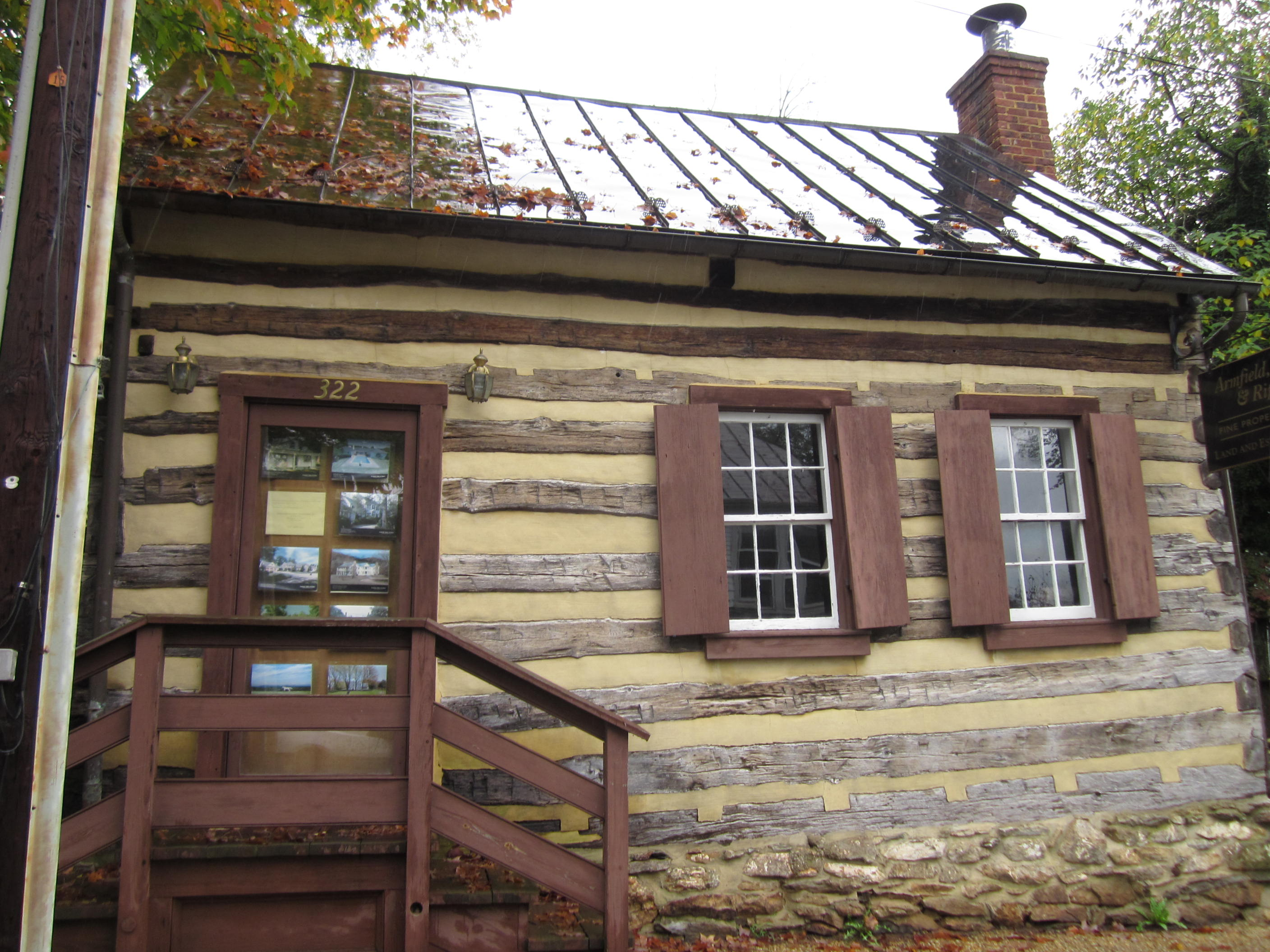
The log cabin at 322 Main Street, considered to be one of the earliest buildings constructed in the town

In 1975, the town was listed on the National Register of Historic Places as "Washington Historic District", and the Town Council passed an ordinance establishing a review board charged with preserving the town's historic character. (More below.)

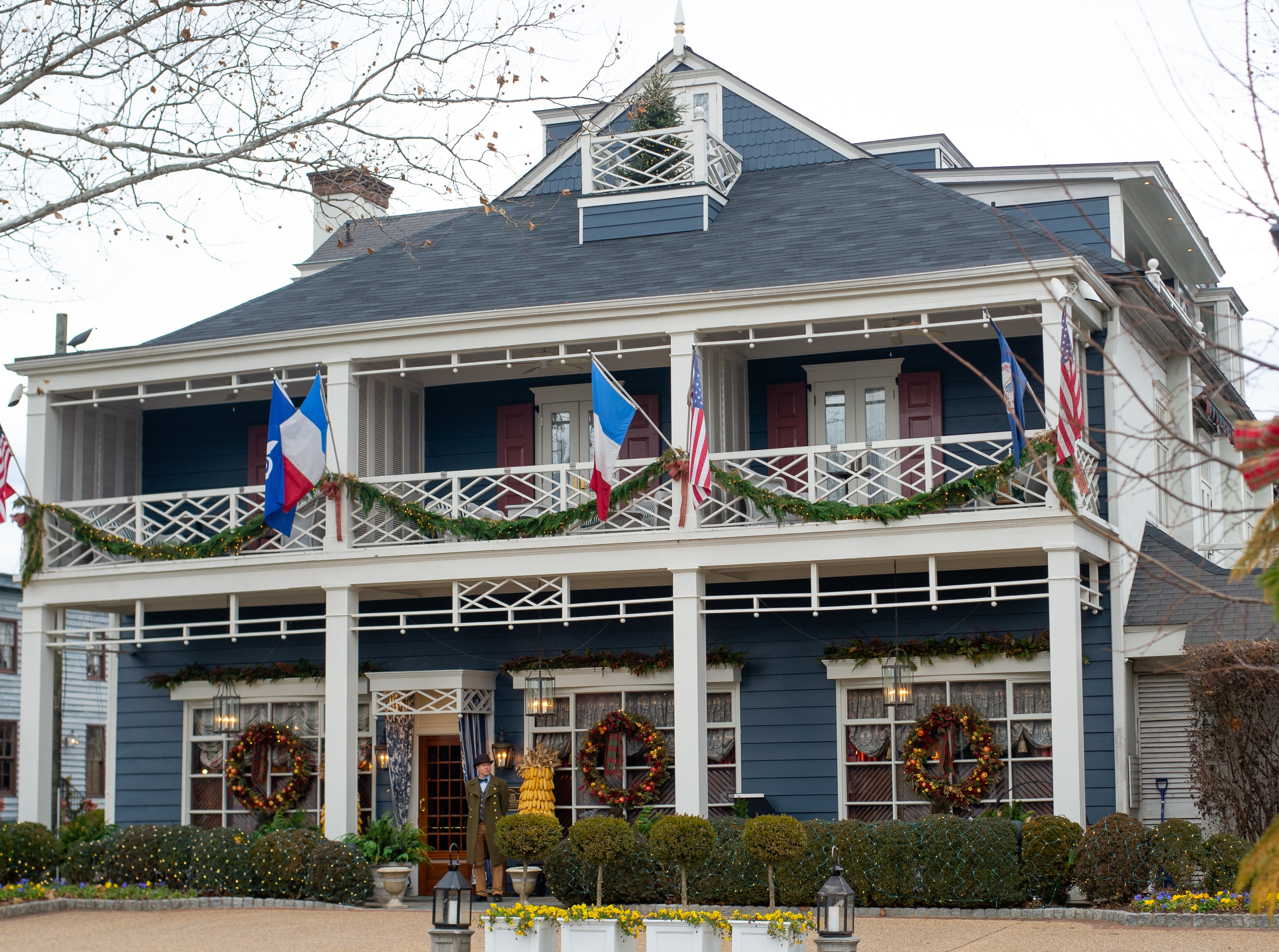
The Inn at Little Washington at Christmastime

One of the most important events in the modern history of the town is the opening of The Inn at Little Washington in 1978. This restaurant and inn celebrated its 40th anniversary in 2018 and has gained national and international fame. It is a member of the luxury hotel association, Relais & Châteaux. It is the first inn to receive the Mobil Travel Guide's 5-Star award, and it has been rated by the American Automobile Association with 5 diamonds for its restaurant and 5 diamonds for its overnight lodging for 28 years. In 2001, the owner and chef of the Inn, Patrick O'Connell, was given the prestigious Outstanding Chef in America Award. La Liste, the French guide to the world's best restaurants, ranked the Inn as the fifth highest rated restaurant in the world. The Inn attracts a discerning clientele from Washington, D.C., and its suburbs. Largely due to the Inn's influence, the town is also home to several art galleries, unique shops, bed and breakfasts, and restaurants. The town attracts art lovers, history buffs, and hikers that come into the county for day hikes or weekend camping trips.

In 1985 the town was rechartered by the Virginia General Assembly. By this new charter, the town was granted much broader powers and increased responsibilities. Washington has evolved to be a safe and quiet community within the rural agricultural environment of Rappahannock County. It still has the same grid of streets and the same street names shown in the 1797 town plan. However, the 51 lots have been subdivided extensively and the boundaries of the town have been significantly enlarged, from the original 25 acres to 182.0171 acres. The town is a community without any large commercial businesses or heavy industry. It is governed by a 7-member Town Council guided by the town's Comprehensive Plan, Planning Commission, Board of Zoning Appeals, and town ordinances.

== Washington Historic District ==
- Washington Historic District
- U.S. National Register of Historic Places
- U.S. Historic district
- Virginia Landmarks Register
- Location within Virginia Location within the United States
- Interactive map showing the location of Washington Historic District
- Location: Town of Washington, Virginia
- Coordinates: 38°42′51″N 78°09′34″W
- Area: 180 acres (73 ha)
- Built: Circa 1800 to 1945
- Built by: Malcolm F. Crawford, James Leake Powers, multiple other builders
- Architectural style: Early Republic, Greek Revival, Jeffersonian, multiple other styles
- NRHP reference No.: 75002033
- VLR No.: 322-0011

Significant dates
- Added to NRHP: May 28, 1975; amended November 21, 2006
- Designated VLR: April 15, 1975; amended September 6, 2006

"Washington Historic District" was added to the Virginia Landmarks Register and to the National Register of Historic Places in 1975. The historic district comprises the entire corporate boundaries of the town (180 acres). (Note: The 1975 nomination incorrectly estimated the acreage of the town to be 140 acres. The nomination document included a boundary description and a plat of the corporate limits. In 1985 a professional survey was completed which determined the town to be 180 acres - Rappahannock County, Court Clerk's Office, Plat Book 4, p. 68) However, most of the historic structures are clustered within the 30-acre core of the town established in 1796–1797 by George Calvert, James Jett Jr., James Wheeler, and William Porter.

At that time, the Town Council passed a Historic District Ordinance which established a Historic District Architectural Review Board. The historic district encompassed the entire town and many properties were considered as contributing to the historic nature of the town. The Town Council's actions were intended to protect and preserve the historic nature of the town. A resurvey of the town was conducted in 2004–2005. In 2006, an amendment was made to the town's historic district designation, extending the period of historic significance to 1945, and the amendment was recorded on both the Virginia Landmarks Register and the National Register in 2006. A total of 159 properties are considered to contribute to the historic nature of the District. Many of the homes and other structures from the earliest period of the town survive today.

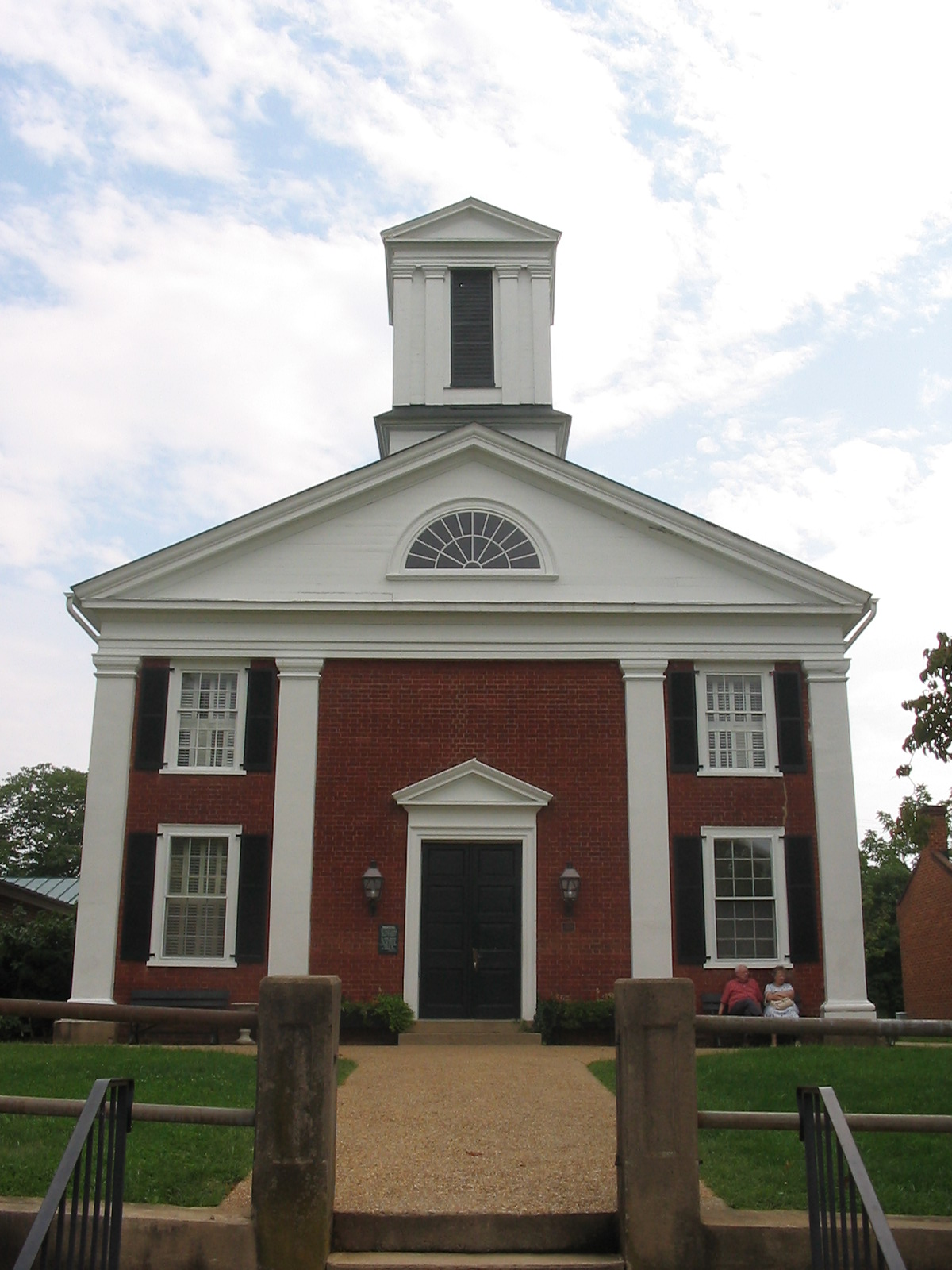
Rappahannock County Courthouse

The chief landmark is the Rappahannock County Courthouse, a two-story Flemish-bond Jeffersonian-style building constructed in 1834–1835 by Malcolm F. Crawford of Albemarle County who had worked on construction of the University of Virginia and built the Page County Courthouse and Greene County Courthouse (both surviving and NRHP-listed), and also the courthouse of Spotsylvania County. Crawford also built the adjacent Court clerk's office (now the office of the Commissioner of Revenue). Other brick buildings in the courthouse complex are the county jail (1835–1836, constructed by John W. Fant of Stafford County) and the county treasurer's office (1857). A small frame building (1857) on the northwest corner of the complex served as the original office of the Commonwealth Attorney.

Other notable buildings include the tavern and inn originally owned by Anne Coxe (circa 1800, now commercial shops); a log building that was probably one of the original dwelling houses constructed when the town was formed in 1796–1797; the country-Gothic Trinity Episcopal church (1857) and the Doric Presbyterian church (1858, now the Town Hall), both constructed by James Leake Powers; the brick Baptist church and Masonic hall (1875); and a brick Edwardian bank building (1915, now commercial offices).

Numerous private homes are also part of the Washington Historic District, including the mansions Avon Hall (circa 1810, moved and enlarged in 1931), the Meadows (circa 1790), Mount Prospect (1872), The Maples (circa 1850, now a bed and breakfast establishment), and the home constructed for Edward Pendleton (circa 1800, now remodeled as overnight lodging for The Inn at Little Washington). In addition to these large homes, there are many privately owned homes with historic significance throughout the Washington Historic District.

The town of Washington has been described as perhaps the best preserved of the county seat communities in the Virginia Piedmont.

Gallery
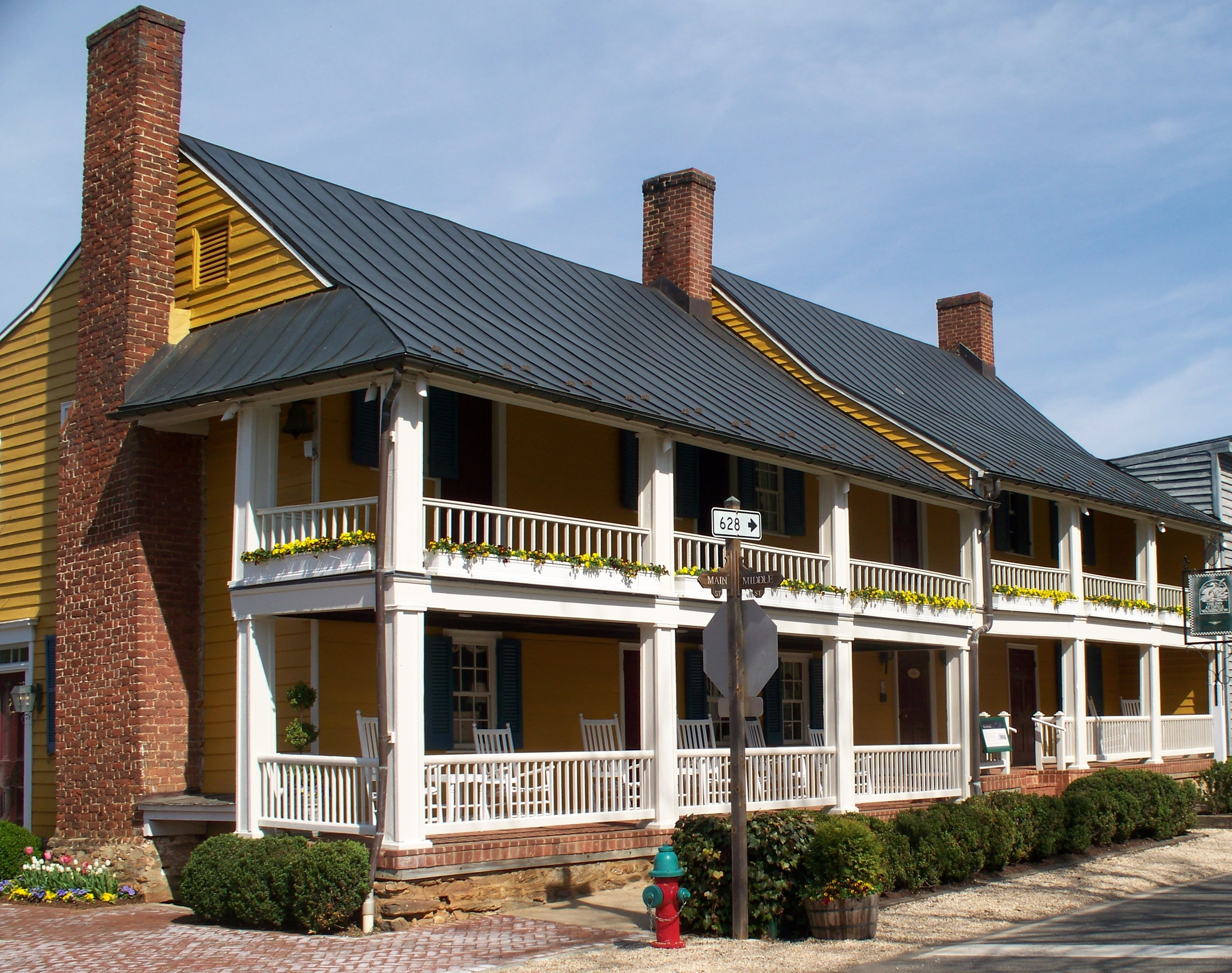
View in 2020 of Mrs. Coxe's tavern, built circa 1800

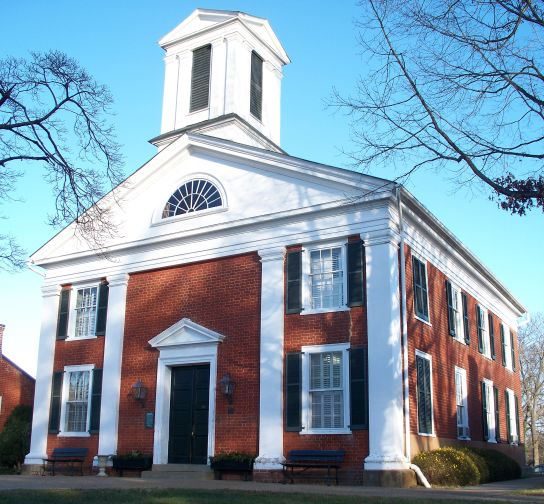
Rappahannock County courthouse, built 1834-1835

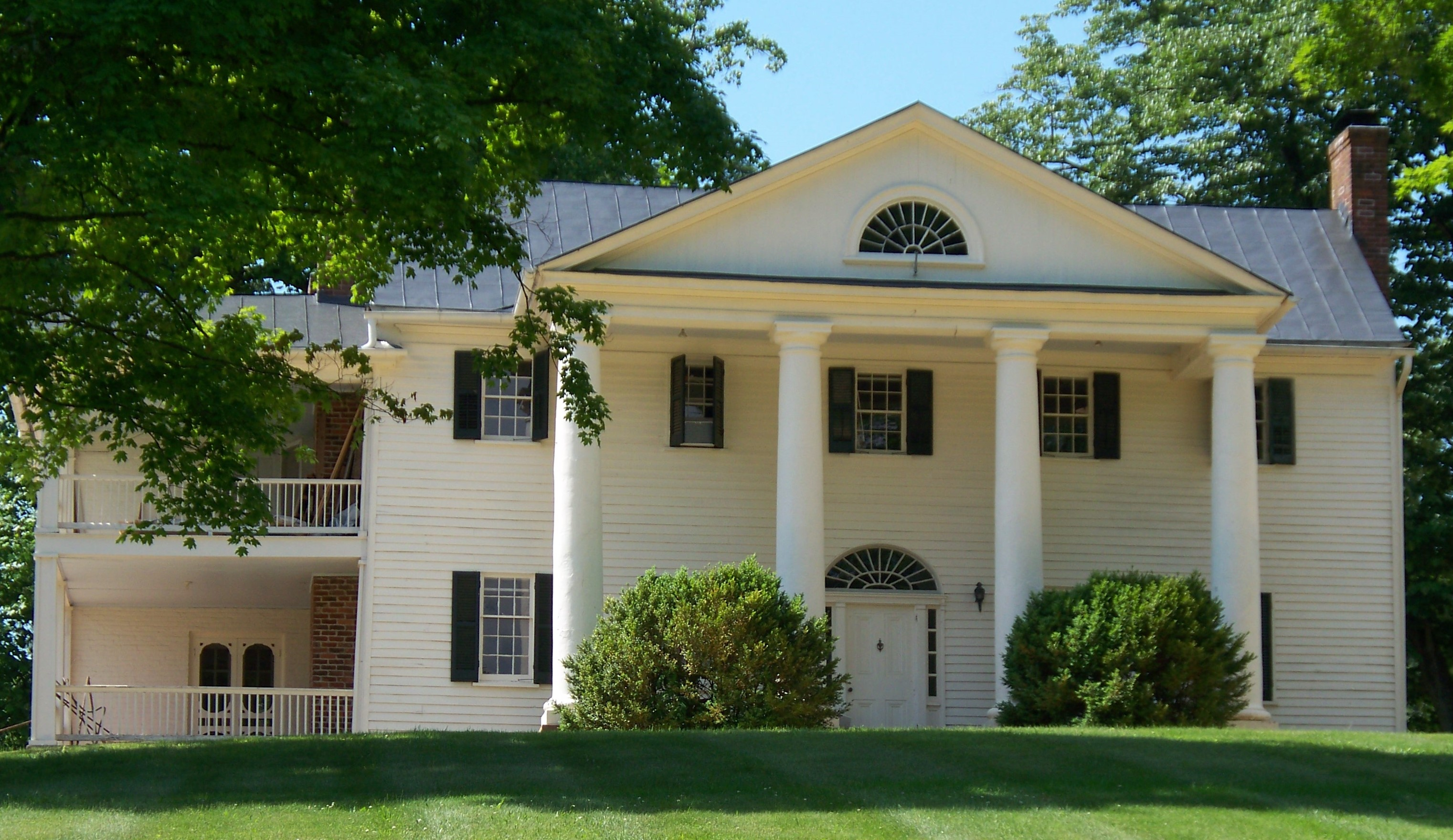
The Avon Hall mansion

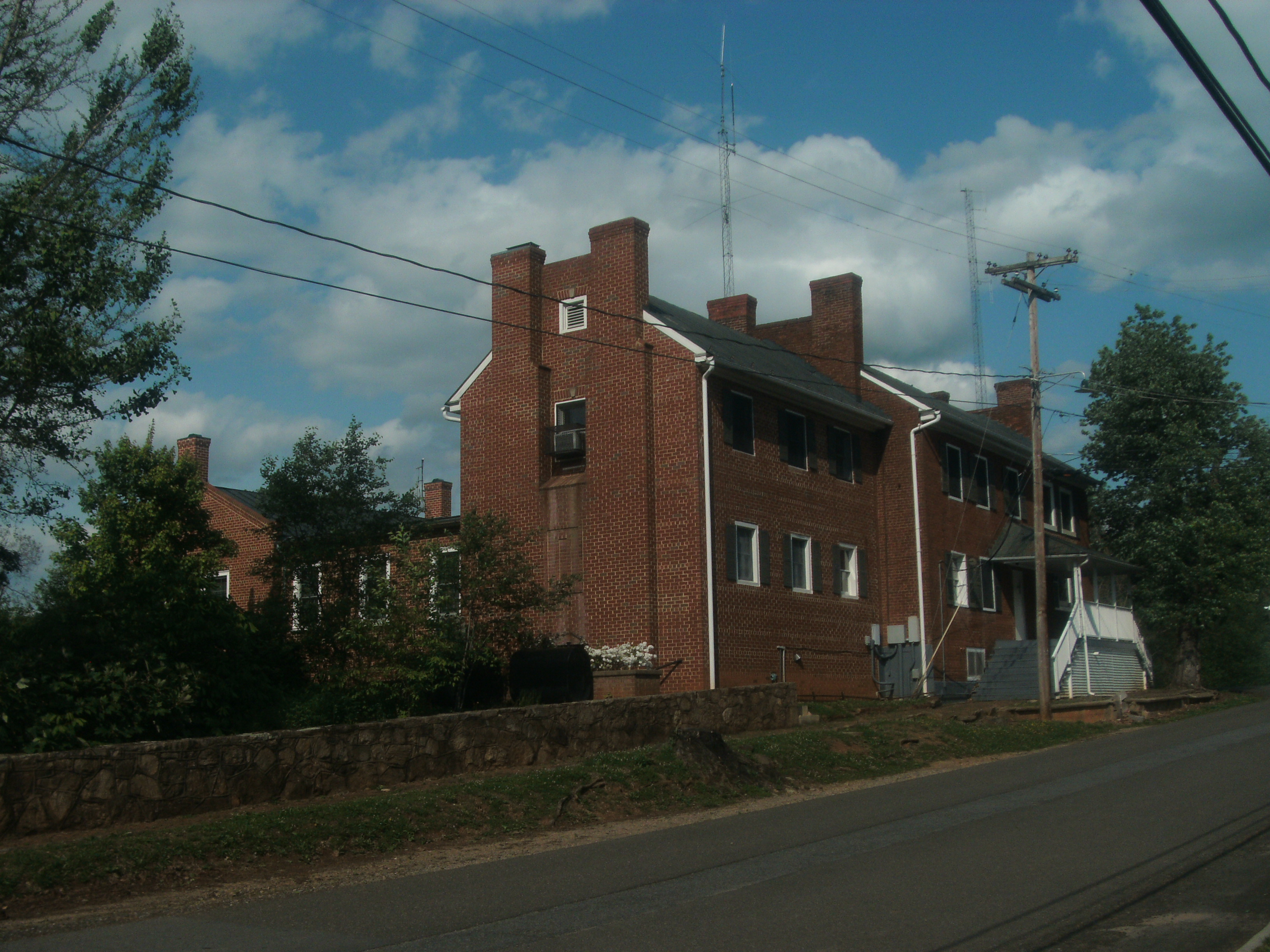
Rappahannock County Jail, built 1835-1836

== Geography ==
Washington is located at 38°42′46″N 78°9′34″W (38.712914, −78.159474).

The town has a total area of 0.284 square miles (0.74 km^{2}), all land except for the Avon Hall pond.

The town is located on the eastern side of the Blue Ridge Mountains near the northern part of Shenandoah National Park.

Historical population
Census	Pop.	Note	%±
1880	254		—
1890	252		−0.8%
1900	300		19.0%
1910	235		−21.7%
1920	233		−0.9%
1930	250		7.3%
1940	245		−2.0%
1950	249		1.6%
1960	255		2.4%
1970	189		−25.9%
1980	247		30.7%
1990	198		−19.8%
2000	183		−7.6%
2010	135		−26.2%
2018 (est.)	125		−7.4%
U.S. Decennial Census

== Highways ==
The main road serving Washington is U.S. Route 211 Business/U.S. Route 522 Business. This road follows Warren Avenue, Middle Street, and Main Street through the town and is the old alignment of U.S. Route 211, which now passes just southeast of the town limits. Via US 211 and US 522, US 211 Bus/US 522 Bus provides access to Luray to the west, Culpeper to the south, Warrenton to the east and Front Royal to the north.

== Education ==
The Rappahannock County Public Schools includes Rappahannock County Elementary School and Rappahannock County High School.

== Notable people ==
Amna Al Qubaisi (born 2000), Emerati-American racing driver.

Ben Jones died in Washington.
