= Huntly, Virginia =

Unincorporated community in Virginia, US

Coordinates: 38°49′35″N 78°06′44″W

Huntly is an unincorporated community in Rappahannock County, in the U.S. state of Virginia.
