= Chester Gap, Virginia =

- Census-designated place (CDP)
- Location of the Chester Gap CDP within Rappahannock County

- Location within the Commonwealth of Virginia Chester Gap, Virginia (the United States)
- Coordinates: 38°51′12″N 78°7′57″W
- Country: United States
- State: Virginia
- County: Rappahannock
- Elevation: 1,526 ft (465 m)

Population (2020 Census)
  - Total: 894
- Time zone: UTC-5 (Eastern (EST))
  - Summer (DST): UTC-4 (EDT)
- ZIP code: 22623
- Area code: 540
- FIPS code: 51-16240
- GNIS feature ID: 2630625

Chester Gap is a census-designated place (CDP) in Rappahannock and Warren Counties, Virginia, United States. As of the 2020 census, Chester Gap had a population of 894. The CDP is named for Chester Gap, the wind gap within which it is located.

== Demographics ==
Historical population
Census	Pop.	Note	%±
2020	894		—
U.S. Decennial Census; 2010 2020

Chester Gap was first listed as a census designated place in the 2010 U.S. census.
