= Rappahannock County, Virginia =

County in Virginia, United States

- County
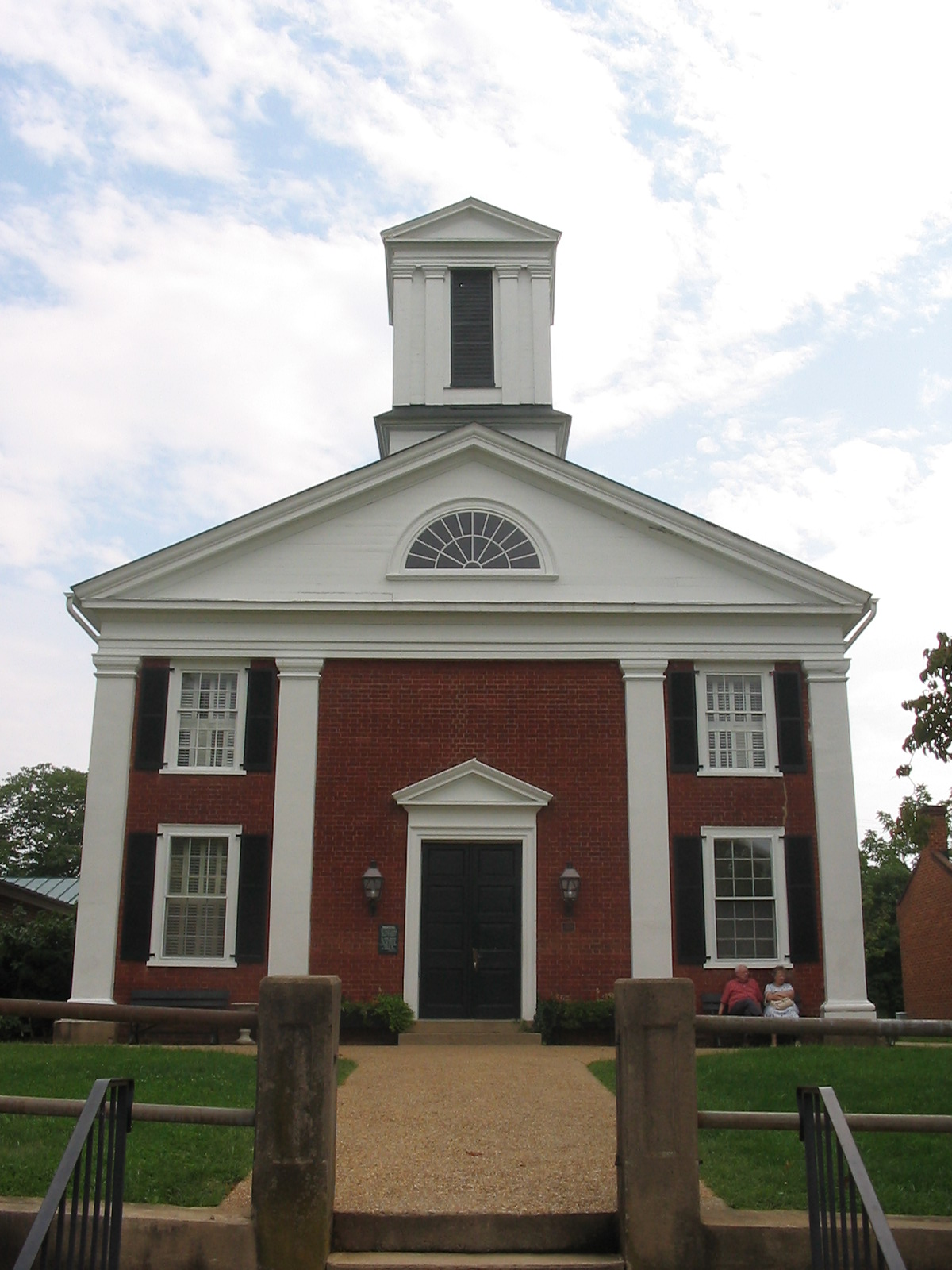
- Rappahannock County Courthouse in Washington, Virginia

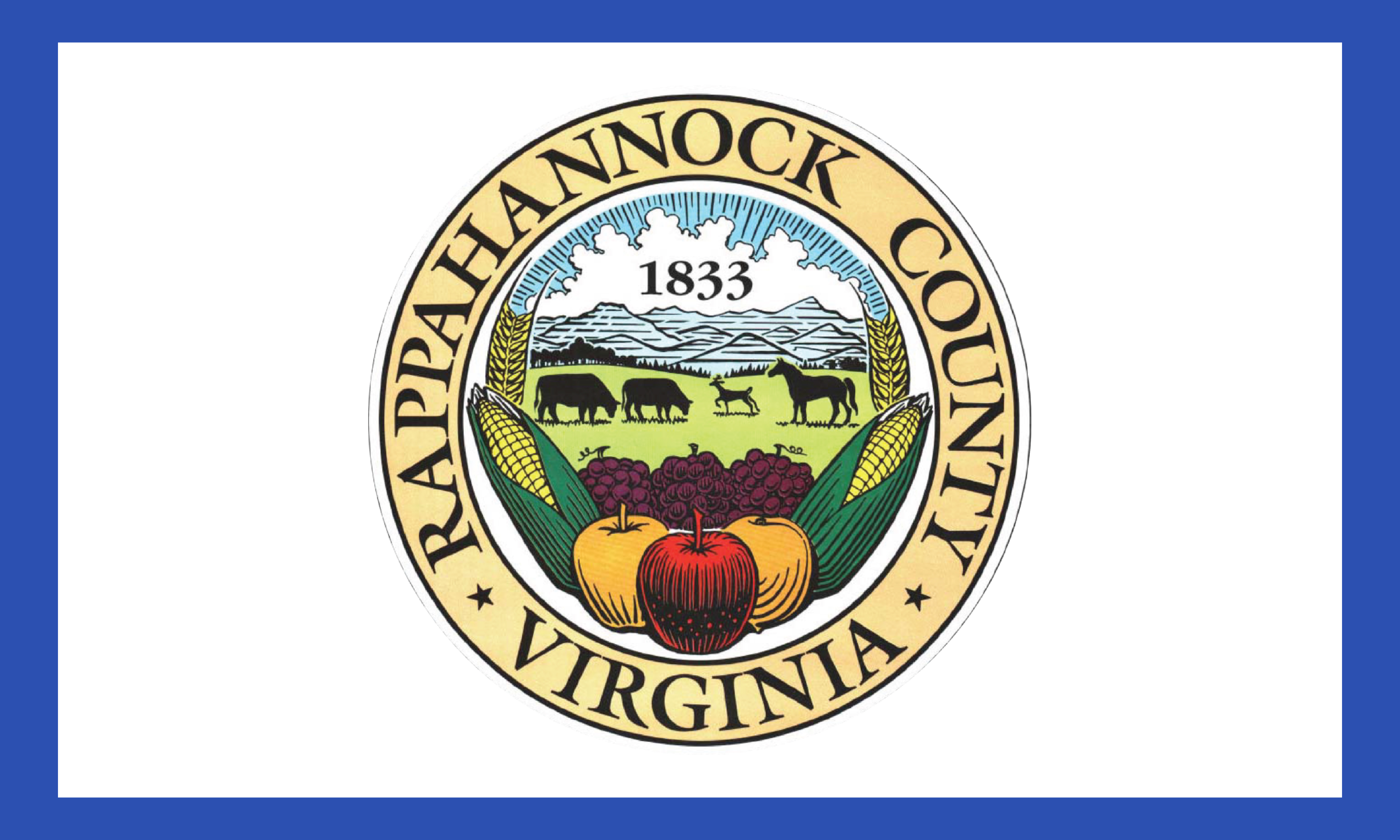
- Flag Seal

- Location within the U.S. state of Virginia
- Coordinates: 38°41′N 78°10′W
- Country: United States
- State: Virginia
- Founded: 1833
- Named for: Rappahannock River
- Seat: Washington
- Largest town: Washington

Area
  - Total: 267 sq mi (690 km^{2})
  - Land: 266 sq mi (690 km^{2})
  - Water: 0.8 sq mi (2.1 km^{2}) 0.3%

Population (2020)
  - Total: 7,348
  - Estimate (2025): 7,439 ▲
  - Density: 27.6/sq mi (10.7/km^{2})
- Time zone: UTC−5 (Eastern)
  - Summer (DST): UTC−4 (EDT)
- Congressional district: 10th
- Website: rappahannockcountyva.gov

Rappahannock County is a county located in the northern Piedmont of the Commonwealth of Virginia, US, adjacent to Shenandoah National Park. As of the 2020 Census, the population was 7,348. Its county seat and only incorporated town, is Washington. The name "Rappahannock" comes from the Algonquian word lappihanne, meaning "river of quick, rising water" or "where the tide ebbs and flows." The county is included in the Washington-Arlington-Alexandria, DC-VA-MD-WV Metropolitan Statistical Area.

== History ==
Rappahannock County was founded by an act of the Virginia General Assembly in 1833, based on the growing population's need to have better access to a county seat. The county's land was carved from Culpeper County. Rappahannock County was named for the river that separates it from Fauquier County.

The land on which Rappahannock County is sited was owned in the early 1700s by Thomas Fairfax 6th Lord Fairfax. It was part of the Northern Neck Proprietary, which consisted of 5.3 million acres of land located between the Rappahannock River and the Potomac River, from their headwaters in the Blue Ridge Mountains to the Chesapeake Bay. In 1649, King Charles II of England, then in exile in France after the execution of his father (Charles I), had given this unmapped and unsettled region to seven loyal supporters. By 1688, the proprietary was owned solely by Thomas Lord Culpeper whose only child married Thomas 5th Lord Fairfax in 1690. They acquired the proprietary on the death of Lord Culpeper, and the region became synonymous with the Fairfax name. In 1719, Thomas Fairfax 6th Lord Fairfax inherited the land.

In 1728, the land that became Rappahannock County began to be granted to individuals by agents of King George II of Great Britain. At that time, it was believed that the headwaters of the Rappahannock River were in the Chester Gap area and that the Rappahannock County land was located south of the Northern Neck Proprietary. Much of the land granted by the King consisted of large tracts along the rivers and streams and was prime agricultural land. In 1735, Thomas Fairfax brought suit against the English crown because of these land grants. Surveying parties were dispatched which determined that the headwaters of the Rappahannock River was the Conway River, which leads into the Rapidan River and then into the Rappahannock River. After 10 years, Fairfax won his suit against the Crown, and land grants in this area subsequent to 1745 were made by Fairfax. After the American Revolution, the remaining land, located primarily in the mountains, was granted by the Commonwealth of Virginia.

After its founding in 1833, Rappahannock County was governed by 25 gentlemen justices, supplemented by a Clerk of the Court, Commonwealth attorney, county surveyor, commissioner of revenue, and sheriff. The courthouse, court clerk's office, and jail were constructed in the town of Washington in 1834–1836. The county was primarily agricultural and self-sufficient, with a few merchants and craftsmen providing goods that could not be made on the farms. Although tobacco was widely grown in tidewater Virginia, the land in Rappahannock County was inadequate for this crop. Instead, farmers in the county grew wheat, oats, corn, and hay and maintained herds of cattle, sheep, and swine. The county was well-watered by streams and rivers originating in the Blue Ridge Mountains, and mills along these waterways were built to grind corn and grain, saw lumber, and card and weave wool. The 1850s was an era of turnpike building, providing access from Culpeper, New Market, and Fredericksburg to the county. At this time, transportation was by foot, by horseback, or by horse-drawn wagon or carriage.

In 1861, Virginia seceded from the Union. No battles were fought in Rappahannock County during the Civil War although there were skirmishes, encampments, and significant troop movements through the county. Men from the county served in the 6th & 12th Regiment Virginia Cavalry and the 1st, 7th, and 49th Regiment Virginia Infantry. The war devastated the agricultural economy of the county and destroyed the turnpikes. After the war, the county was governed under the auspices of Military District No. 1 commanded by Union General John M. Schofield. In 1870, a new Virginia constitution was adopted that mandated the county be divided into five townships with one elected supervisor from each to form a Board to perform the executive functions of the county. This government by a five-member Board of Supervisors still exists.

Recovery from the war was slow, but times were becoming more prosperous by the 1890s. The county remained primarily rural and agricultural. Apples became an important cash crop. Rappahannock County moved into the 20th century with the introduction of telephones, electricity, automobiles, improved roads, high school education, and a local newspaper. A jitney company was created in 1916 to provide public transportation, followed by other bus lines in the 1920s and 1930s. In the mid-1920s, the Commonwealth of Virginia began actions to acquire land to establish Shenandoah National Park, either by purchase from willing owners or by condemnation and purchase. About 32,000 acres of Rappahannock County land was conveyed to the federal government for the Park, displacing multiple families. A memorial with the surnames of those who lived in the Rappahannock County portion of the Park was constructed along Route 211 in 2019. Two resettlement areas were established in the county, one near the town of Washington and the other near the village of Flint Hill. During the Depression years of the 1930s, the county benefited from President Franklin Roosevelt's New Deal programs. Construction of Skyline Drive in Shenandoah National Park began in 1931 through the Civilian Conservation Corps (CCC), and several of their camps were established at Beech Spring on Route 211 west of Sperryville and north and south of Thornton's Gap at the top of the Blue Ridge. These provided work for local men and a market for farmers for produce, meat, milk, and eggs to feed the corpsmen.

The opening of Shenandoah National Park brought substantial tourism business to the county in the 1930s, aided by inexpensive automobile transportation and by the Commonwealth of Virginia taking over maintenance of all primary and secondary roads in the county. The area became replete with gasoline stations, roadside businesses, lunchrooms, restaurants, and motels. Many private homes took in overnight lodgers. In the 1970s, there was an influx of young adults into the county who were seeking a rural lifestyle and who brought with them their skills and talents as artists, artisans, musicians, carpenters, and other craftsmen. They blended with the rural residents who already lived in the county, often for many generations, which fostered the community of diverse individuals who live in the county today. Rappahannock County continues to cater to tourists and locals alike, with chic restaurants, bars, artisan shops, artist studios, bed and breakfast accommodations, and antique stores. However, the county remains primarily rural, agricultural, and undeveloped, in large part due to tight governmental control of land zoning and restrictions on subdivision.

== Historic districts and structures ==
Rappahannock County has five historic districts designated on the National Register of Historic Places. These are located in Ben Venue, Flint Hill, Laurel Mills, Sperryville, and the town of Washington. It also has thirteen historic structures listed on the National Register. Many other homes and buildings in the county are also historic, dating from the 1800s. The Virginia Department of Historic Resources maintains a database of historic properties in the County that contains information on more than 700 properties. Over 300 family cemeteries have also been documented as historic resources.

== Geography ==
According to the U.S. Census Bureau, the county has a total area of 267.2 square miles (692.0 km^{2}), of which 266.4 sq mi (690.0 km^{2}) is land and 0.8 sq mi (2.1 km^{2}) (0.3%) is water. The Rappahannock River forms the northeastern boundary and separates Rappahannock County from Fauquier County. Rappahannock County is bounded on the southeast by Culpeper County and on the southwest by Madison County. The Blue Ridge Mountains occupy much of the western portion of the county.

=== Adjacent counties ===
- Warren County – northwest
- Fauquier County – northeast
- Culpeper County – southeast
- Madison County – southwest
- Page County – west

=== National protected area ===
- Shenandoah National Park (part)

=== Mountains ===
Rappahannock County is located in the northern Piedmont area of Virginia. Much of its land consists of monadnocks, many of which were named for the families that originally owned the land. These small mountains culminate in the west at the Blue Ridge Mountains of Shenandoah National Park. When the Park's land was privately owned, much of the land had been cleared for farms, pasturage, and orchards. Today, these mountainsides are completely wooded again, laced with hiking trails including the Appalachian Trail and with Skyline Drive located along the summits of the Blue Ridge Mountains. The summits of the following mountains are located within Rappahannock County:

- Battle and Little Battle Mountains
- Big and Little Bastard Mountains
- Bessie Bell Mountain
- Browns Mountain
- Buck Ridge
- Butler Mountain
- Castle (Castleton) Mountain
- Catlett Mountain
- Chancellor Mountain
- Compton Peak
- Fielding Mountain
- Fodderstack Mountain
- Fogg Mountain
- Fork Mountain
- Ginger Hill
- Googe Mountain
- Grindstone Mountain
- Hazel Mountain
- Hickerson Mountain
- Hogback Mountain
- Hot Mountain
- Jefferson Mountain
- Jenkins and Little Jenkins Mountains
- Jobbers Mountain
- Keyser Mountain
- Long Mountain
- Mary's Rock
- Mason and Little Mason Mountains
- Massies Mountain
- Meetinghouse Mountain
- Menefee Mountain
- Mulky and Little Mulky Mountains
- North Marshall Mountain
- Long Mountain
- Oventop Mountain
- Pass Mountain
- The Peak
- Pickerel Ridge
- Pignut Mountain
- Pine Hill
- Piney Ridge
- The Pinnacle
- Poes Mountain
- Poortown Mountain
- Redmans Mountain
- Red Oak Mountain
- Rosser Mountain
- Round Mountain
- Schoolhouse Mountain
- Skinner Ridge
- Slaughter Mountain
- Turkey Ridge
- Turkey Mountain
- Walden Mountain
- Wolf Mountain

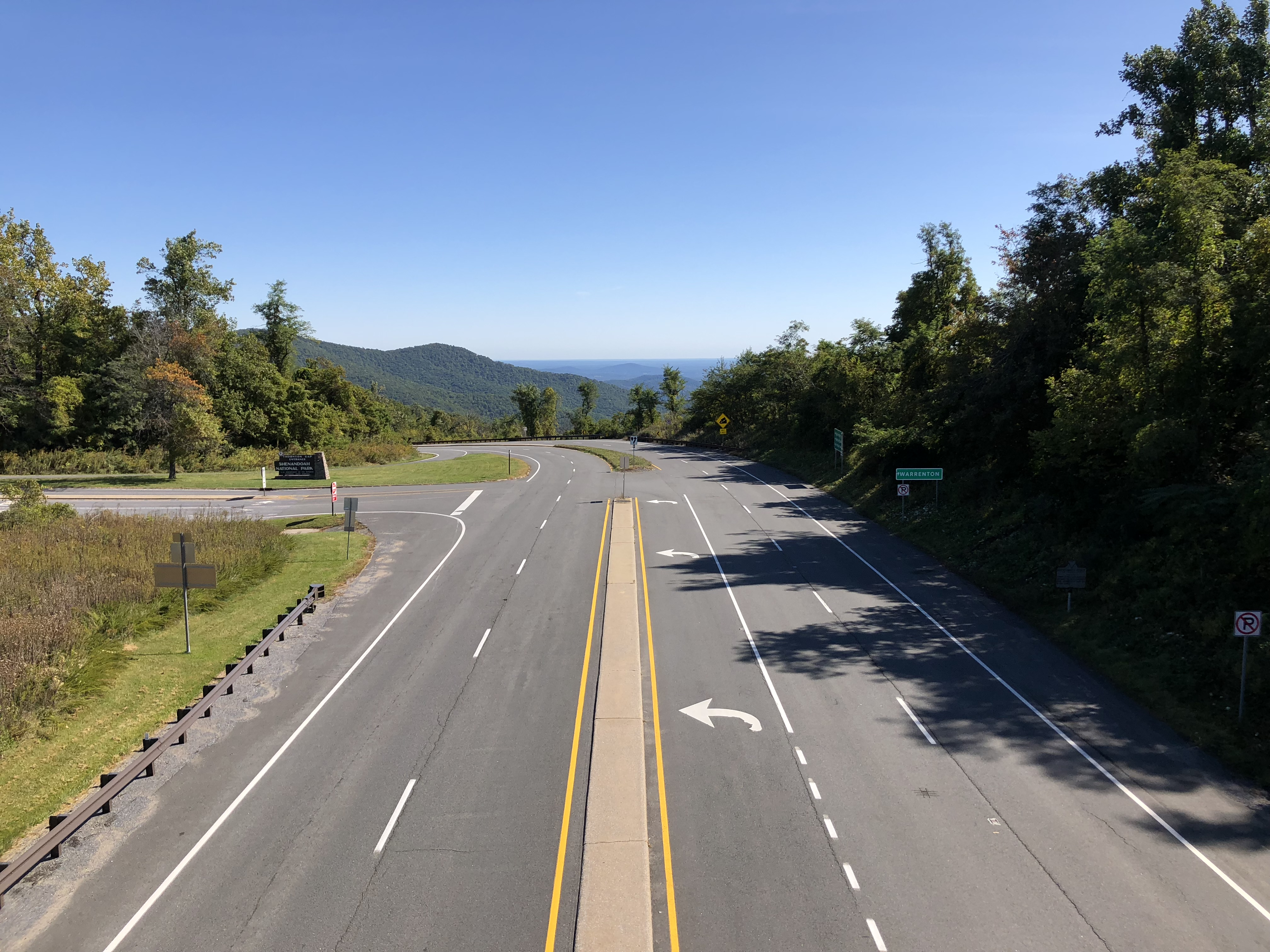
U.S. Route 211 as it enters Rappahannock County over the Blue Ridge Mountains.

=== Transportation ===
Three primary highways traverse the county: U.S. Route 211, U.S. Route 522, and State Route 231. These account for 57 miles and 21% of the total public road mileage. The remaining 219 miles are secondary roads which provide a link to the rural residential and farm areas of the county. Five roads in the county have been designated as Virginia Scenic Byways, and Skyline Drive in Shenandoah National Park has been designated as a National Scenic Byway. The county has no public transportation by air, bus, or rail.

- US 211
- US 522
- SR 231
- Skyline Drive

== Demographics ==
Historical population
Census	Pop.	Note	%±
1840	9,257		—
1850	9,782		5.7%
1860	8,850		−9.5%
1870	8,261		−6.7%
1880	9,291		12.5%
1890	8,678		−6.6%
1900	8,843		1.9%
1910	8,044		−9.0%
1920	8,070		0.3%
1930	7,717		−4.4%
1940	7,208		−6.6%
1950	6,112		−15.2%
1960	5,368		−12.2%
1970	5,199		−3.1%
1980	6,093		17.2%
1990	6,622		8.7%
2000	6,983		5.5%
2010	7,373		5.6%
2020	7,348		−0.3%
2025 (est.)	7,439	▲	1.2%
U.S. Decennial Census; 1790–1960 1900–1990; 1990–2000 2010 2020

=== Racial and ethnic composition ===
Rappahannock County, Virginia – Racial and ethnic composition Note: the US Census treats Hispanic/Latino as an ethnic category. This table excludes Latinos from the racial categories and assigns them to a separate category. Hispanics/Latinos may be of any race.
Race / Ethnicity (NH = Non-Hispanic)	Pop 1980	Pop 1990	Pop 2000	Pop 2010	Pop 2020	% 1980	% 1990	% 2000	% 2010	% 2020
White alone (NH)	5,358	6,041	6,411	6,653	6,444	87.94%	91.23%	91.81%	90.23%	87.70%
Black or African American alone (NH)	669	491	374	318	198	10.98%	7.41%	5.36%	4.31%	2.69%
Native American or Alaska Native alone (NH)	0	10	11	15	17	0.00%	0.15%	0.16%	0.20%	0.23%
Asian alone (NH)	9	13	15	39	63	0.15%	0.20%	0.21%	0.53%	0.86%
Native Hawaiian or Pacific Islander alone (NH)	x	x	0	3	0	x	x	0.00%	0.04%	0.00%
Other race alone (NH)	3	0	6	9	30	0.05%	0.00%	0.09%	0.12%	0.41%
Mixed race or Multiracial (NH)	x	x	75	108	307	x	x	1.07%	1.46%	4.18%
Hispanic or Latino (any race)	54	67	91	228	289	0.89%	1.01%	1.30%	3.09%	3.93%
Total	6,093	6,622	6,983	7,373	7,348	100.00%	100.00%	100.00%	100.00%	100.00%

=== 2020 census ===
As of the 2020 census, the county had a population of 7,348. The median age was 52.4 years. 16.5% of residents were under the age of 18 and 27.6% of residents were 65 years of age or older. For every 100 females there were 100.2 males, and for every 100 females age 18 and over there were 99.0 males age 18 and over.

The racial makeup of the county was 88.7% White, 2.7% Black or African American, 0.2% American Indian and Alaska Native, 0.9% Asian, 0.0% Native Hawaiian and Pacific Islander, 1.4% from some other race, and 6.0% from two or more races. Hispanic or Latino residents of any race comprised 3.9% of the population.

0.0% of residents lived in urban areas, while 100.0% lived in rural areas.

There were 3,202 households in the county, of which 22.2% had children under the age of 18 living with them and 24.1% had a female householder with no spouse or partner present. About 29.4% of all households were made up of individuals and 15.9% had someone living alone who was 65 years of age or older.

There were 3,826 housing units, of which 16.3% were vacant. Among occupied housing units, 76.3% were owner-occupied and 23.7% were renter-occupied. The homeowner vacancy rate was 1.6% and the rental vacancy rate was 6.6%.

=== Earlier demographics ===
From 1840 to 1970, the county had a marked decline in population, from 9,257 people to 5,199 people. This was primarily due to freed slaves moving north and fewer people needed to operate farms. Since 1970 there has been an increase in the population.

Rappahannock residents are among the oldest in Virginia, with a median age of 47.5 years in 2010; this is about 11 years greater than the U.S. as a whole. The 2010 census found 19% of residents were age 65 and older, which was a marked increase over the 2000 census finding of 14%. The population of the county is widely dispersed, with a density of only 27.9 people per square mile, ranking it 122nd among Virginia's 132 cities and counties in population density.

Between 1960 and 2010, the number of housing units more than doubled. The county has been populated by three waves: those who've lived in the county for many generations, those who started coming to the county in the 1960s and 1970s as young adults, and retirees and weekenders who decided to settle in the county since about 1990. The poor, near poor, middle income, and wealthy all live scrambled together. “All seem to appreciate the beauty and quiet of the county, its family farms, the quality of its rivers and streams, and the unblemished views of the night skies.”

== Land use, zoning, and development ==
Rappahannock County contains a land area of 266.6 square miles; of this 73.7% is forests (including 49.5 square miles in Shenandoah National Park), 20.1% is pasture/farmland, and the remainder is roads and buildings and their surroundings. The main forest type is oak–hickory.

One factor that has played a large role in protecting Rappahannock County's rural identity is the Virginia state law allowing tax deductions for land devoted to agricultural, horticultural, or forest uses (“land use”). By enabling property owners to significantly reduce their tax bills, the tax deferments have permitted large landowners to keep farms and forests intact, instead of needing to subdivide and sell parcels. That was the intent of the state law when it was passed in the 1970s and adopted by the county in 1982.

These tax deductions have a downside, in that they significantly reduce the county's revenue. In 2017, land in the county that had a land-use deduction generated about $3.54 million in revenue. Without the deductions, the same land would have brought in more than $7.58 million in revenue. About 50% of the county's total acreage now receives a land-use tax deferment, although that represents less than one-third of the parcels of taxable land — 1,850 out of 5,840 parcels.

Of the 266.6 square miles comprising the county, about 52.2 square miles of land has been placed in conservation easements by individual landowners, guaranteeing preservation of the integrity of the landscape, restrictions on development, and protection of water and scenic resources. An additional 49.5 square miles are located in Shenandoah National Park, which affords this land the protection of the federal government, and 130.3 square miles are in land use. This leaves only about 30.6 square miles that are not protected from development (excluding existing roads and buildings).

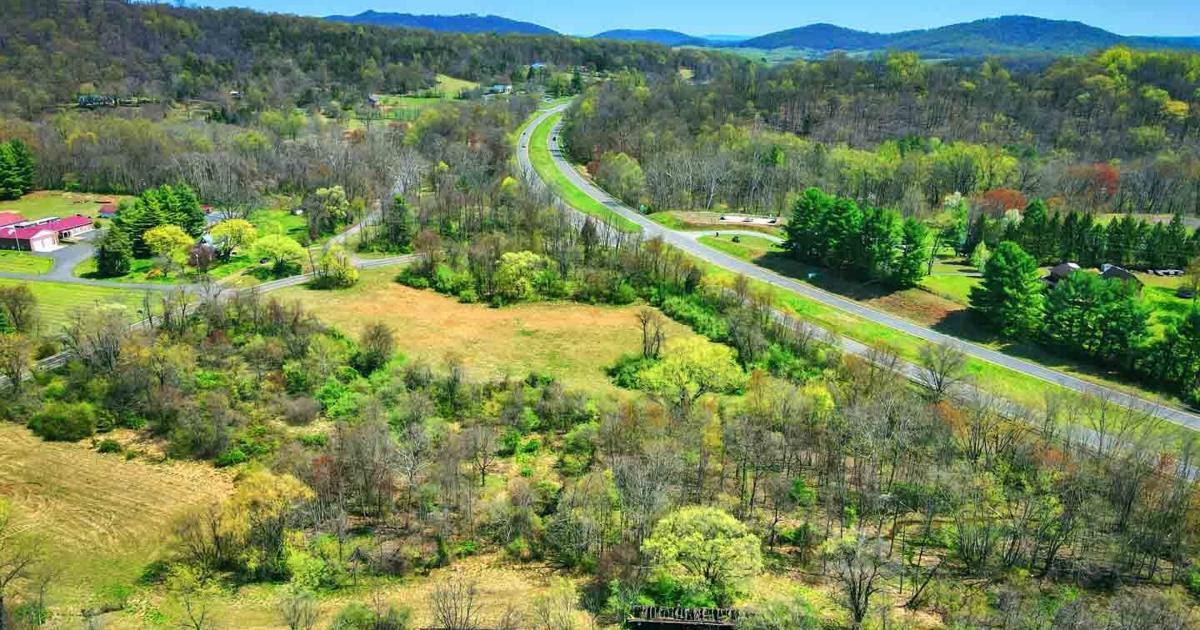
Aerial view of part of Rappahannock County, Virginia

The county has a long tradition of progressive planning and policies for land use to restrict development and to maintain the rural, bucolic nature of the county. The first subdivision ordinance was enacted in 1962 and the first zoning ordinance in 1966. Land use policies are formulated by the Board of Supervisors with the advice of the Planning Commission and the Board of Zoning Appeals, both of which are citizen advisory groups appointed by the Board. These and other policies are incorporated into the Rappahannock County Code. Complementing these governmental bodies are the efforts of individual citizens and local organizations such as the Rappahannock League for Environmental Protection and the Piedmont Environmental Council.

The 25-acre zoning restriction for land parcels outside the villages has clearly become a defining feature of Rappahannock, one that distinguishes it as a rural oasis in a region of hyper-development. Many residents believe that strict zoning and density ordinances have slowed population growth and spared Rappahannock “the environmentally destructive growth we see in the counties around us. We take credit for comprehensive planning happening here before it was required.”

== Economy ==
Historically, the county has had a rural economy based on agriculture. However, present day agriculture has been influenced by significant removal of land from farming. Between 1949 and 1974, the total number of farms declined about 63%, from 687 to 257 farms. This trend showed a slow reverse and in 2017 there were 439 farms in the county, although only 86 farms contained 180 acres or more. Almost all are family farms. Some farmers don't own the land they farm but lease it from owners who are content to have pastures maintained and fences kept in good order. Cropland is primarily devoted to hay, and pastureland is primarily for beef cattle, with small amounts of land for sheep and goats.

Orchard land in the county was devoted to apple production for many years, with a smaller peach crop. The production of orchard crops has sharply declined to the point where only 20 small farms still harvested apples and 10 still harvested peaches in 2017. Vineyards now occupy a small part of county farmland. Wineries, organic farms, and consumer demand for grass-fed beef have created new opportunities for farmers. Several farm operations have successfully tapped into the Washington D.C. market, selling their produce at urban farmer's markets. There are nine award-winning wineries in the county as well as two distilleries, two breweries, and a cider and mead facility.

Together with the decline in farms, agriculture no longer employs as high a percentage of the workforce as was once the case. In 2010, only 7% of the 3,412 employed persons were in the employment category of farming, forestry, fishing, and mining. In that year, 17% were employed in health/education, 15% in construction, 12.5% in professional/administrative occupations, 10.9% in personal/recreation services, 9.6% in retail trade, and the remainder in miscellaneous other occupations. About 19% of residents were age 65 years or older, and most of these were retired.

The median family income in 2010 was $75,975; 35% of families had incomes of $100,000 or greater. Rappahannock County ranks among the top 10 wealthiest jurisdictions in Virginia. In 2017, county residents had a gross income of $265 million, but much of that wealth was concentrated in a small number of residents. The county ranks in the 17th percentile for income inequality compared to all U.S. counties. About 10% of county families are below the federal poverty level.

There are no large private employers located in the county. There are no supermarkets, pharmacies, large stores, or large office buildings in the county. The absence of a commercial tax base places pressure on homeowners’ property taxes to fund the county budget. In a survey by the University of Virginia for the Foothills Forum, residents wanted the beauty, the mountain vistas, the clean rivers and the dark, starlit skies preserved, even if they must drive out of the county to shop at a supermarket or fill a prescription. About 80% of county residents surveyed ranked inadequate cellphone and internet coverage as the biggest issues facing the county. Coverage is available primarily along the main highways passing through the county or through unreliable satellite service. The Rappahannock County Broadband Authority has been established to investigate this issue.

== Government ==
Like many counties in Virginia, Rappahannock County is governed by a Board of Supervisors who serve staggered 4-year terms. Voters in each of the five districts of the county elect one member of the Board; the chair of the Board is chosen by the five supervisors. The Board handles policy issues, sets the budget, and appoints a county administrator to handle the county government's day-to-day operations.

Over the years, the Board of Supervisors of Rappahannock County has kept a tight rein on spending. In fiscal year July 2020-June 2021, the county government budget was $26.6 million, of which 50% was designated for education of students in the two public schools. Other expenditure categories included 10.7% for county government expenses, 9.5% for public safety, 5.5% for fire and emergency medical services, 2.4% for refuse disposal, 1.4% for the public library, and 0.1% for parks and recreation. Some of the county's expenses were supplemented by state, federal, and grant funding.

Taxes on real estate ($13.3 million) and personal property ($1.4 million) comprised 55% of county revenues in 2020–2021. The absence of a commercial tax base has resulted in high taxes for homeowners. The county does not have manufacturing, large box stores, and other similar commercial establishments and hence has a commercial tax base of only about $700,000.

=== Board of Supervisors ===
- Debbie Donehey – Chair (Wakefield District)
- Gary Settle – (Piedmont District)
- John Genho – (Stonewall-Hawthorne District)
- Keir Whitson – Vice-Chair (Hampton District)
- Donna Comer – (Jackson District)

=== Politics ===
Rappahannock County invariably leans toward the Republican Party, doing so every election since 1980. However, parts of Sperryville are quite culturally liberal.

United States presidential election results for Rappahannock County, Virginia
Year	Republican		Democratic		Third party(ies)	
Year	No.	%	No.	%	No.	%
1912	94	19.83%	356	75.11%	24	5.06%
1916	84	17.07%	401	81.50%	7	1.42%
1920	210	33.33%	418	66.35%	2	0.32%
1924	89	17.62%	395	78.22%	21	4.16%
1928	329	39.07%	513	60.93%	0	0.00%
1932	124	17.22%	590	81.94%	6	0.83%
1936	241	25.97%	686	73.92%	1	0.11%
1940	225	27.57%	588	72.06%	3	0.37%
1944	297	37.26%	497	62.36%	3	0.38%
1948	311	30.08%	617	59.67%	106	10.25%
1952	619	54.35%	518	45.48%	2	0.18%
1956	514	47.81%	523	48.65%	38	3.53%
1960	426	43.69%	544	55.79%	5	0.51%
1964	449	39.84%	675	59.89%	3	0.27%
1968	594	43.58%	394	28.91%	375	27.51%
1972	1,055	68.20%	471	30.45%	21	1.36%
1976	881	44.47%	1,071	54.06%	29	1.46%
1980	1,179	49.81%	1,055	44.57%	133	5.62%
1984	1,696	62.65%	999	36.90%	12	0.44%
1988	1,657	61.69%	1,003	37.34%	26	0.97%
1992	1,410	44.33%	1,273	40.02%	498	15.66%
1996	1,505	47.31%	1,405	44.17%	271	8.52%
2000	1,850	52.66%	1,462	41.62%	201	5.72%
2004	2,172	53.63%	1,837	45.36%	41	1.01%
2008	2,227	50.56%	2,105	47.79%	73	1.66%
2012	2,311	53.04%	1,980	45.44%	66	1.51%
2016	2,539	56.64%	1,747	38.97%	197	4.39%
2020	2,812	56.49%	2,096	42.11%	70	1.41%
2024	2,943	58.10%	2,041	40.30%	81	1.60%

== Education ==
Education was provided by private schools during the 1800s until mandatory public education was instituted by the Underwood Constitution of 1869–1870, which resulted in the creation of 14 white and 7 black primary education schools in Rappahannock County. High schools for whites were established in the town of Washington and the village of Sperryville in 1908–1909; black students were bussed out of the county to the Manassas Industrial Institute and the George Washington Carver school.

In 2017–2018, the Rappahannock County Public Schools served about 812 students in grades preK through 12 at one elementary school and one high school (Rappahannock County High School). The graduation rate was 94%, and 80% of graduates continued their education after completing high school. Per pupil expenditures were $14,406. Of this, 80% was derived from local taxes and only 20% from the State. Overall, in Virginia the State contributes 55% to counties for education. Rappahannock County's Local Composite Index, an indicator used to allocate State aid to school districts, was 11th highest in Virginia, resulting in extreme limitations on State aid for education in the county. The Local Composite Index uses the true value of real estate in its computation, whereas most Rappahannock County land is under land use or conservation easements and is taxed at significantly less than true value. The large proportion of education costs derived from local real estate taxes is symptomatic of the fact that there are no large businesses in the county.

There are also four private schools in the county. In 2018, Wakefield Country Day School served 150 students, Hearthstone School served 50 students, Belle Meade Montessori School served 25 students, and the Child Care and Learning Center served 65 children. About 60 county children were home-schooled.

Although there is no large higher education facility in the county, the Rapp Center for Education is a non-profit organization committed to lifelong learning and workforce training and is registered with the State Council for Higher Education. Knowledgeable residents of the county teach numerous courses in their particular specialties through this facility. Healthcare training is provided toward certification as a Clinical Medical Assistant, Radiography Technician, and Pharmacy Technician. Courses are also taught on Information Technology knowledge and skills to help people develop a broader understanding of IT.

== Communities ==

There is one incorporated town (Washington) and five village settlements in the county (Chester Gap, Flint Hill, Sperryville, Amissville, and Woodville). The villages have no defined legal boundaries and are characterized generally by having a rural post office and general store, older homes, one or more houses of worship, service stations, and small commercial establishments.

=== Town ===
- Washington

=== Census-designated places ===
- Chester Gap
- Flint Hill
- Sperryville

=== Other unincorporated communities ===
- Amissville
- Boston
- Castleton
- Huntly
- Laurel Mills
- Peola Mills
- Revercombs Corner
- Wakefield Manor
- Woodville

=== Community facilities and activities ===
There are no stoplights in Rappahannock County. There are also no large stores, franchise fast-food places, or sprawling subdivisions in the county.

The county maintains one public library, located in the central part of the county, managed by three employees and a nine-member Board of Trustees. In 2020, there were 3,349 library card holders, circulation was 22,245, and there were 16,768 individual uses of the library's WiFi; the latter statistic is indicative of the lack of internet service to the county. The operating budget for the library was $315,857, of which the county provided 66%, the State provided 15%, and 19% was from endowment and other sources.

In nighttime photos taken from space, the county is one of the few conspicuous dark spots amid a blaze of lights illuminating the East Coast from Miami to Maine. It is one of the last places on the East Coast with a view of the Milky Way. In 2019, the Rappahannock County Park was certified as an International Dark-Sky Park by the International Dark-Sky Association. It is the third Virginia park to receive a Dark-Sky Park designation, the other two being state parks. Rappahannock County Park is also the third county park in the U.S. to be awarded this honor. Throughout the year, multiple lectures and dark sky viewing events are held during evenings in the Park.

There are seven volunteer fire and rescue companies in the county. Amissville, Castleton, Chester Gap, Flint Hill, and Washington handle both fire and ambulance calls; Sperryville has separate squads. None of the members of these squads have paid positions. The county is served by the weekly Rappahannock News newspaper. The county seat of Washington is home to the three Michelin Star Inn at Little Washington. Thirty-five churches are located in the county, although many of these have small congregations. There are two medical facilities. The Rappahannock Historical Society, founded in 1964 and located in the town of Washington, serves as a resource for historical and genealogical information about the county.

Local support for the arts is provided through the Rappahannock Association for the Arts and the Community. The annual Rappahannock County Arts Tour provides an opportunity to visit artists in their studios. There are three performing arts theaters: the Theatre at Washington, Virginia, the RAAC Community Theater, and the Theater House at Castleton Farms, founded by the late Lorin Maazel which features the Castleton Chamber Players and the Castleton Music Festival. The nationally renowned Kid Pan Alley originated in and is still based in the county. Rappahannock Radio interviews members of the local community and beyond.

Other amusements and events include a 9-hole golf course; the annual Fodderstack 10K race; Sperryfest street fair featuring the Great Rubber Duck Race Down the Thornton River; Oktoberfest held in Sperryville, a collaborative effort by local farms, breweries, and businesses involving beer and food prepared and served by the brewers and farmers of the county; the annual Rappahannock Farm Tour; the annual Artists of Rappahannock tour of artists’ studios; Old Dominion Hounds Point-to-Point races; the Amissville carnival and parade; Rappahannock Rough Ride for bicyclists; John Jackson Piedmont Blues festival; Fourth of July celebration and fireworks; and Christmas in Little Washington parade and festivities.

Recreation in Rappahannock County includes fishing, horseback riding, camping, hiking, and canoeing, particularly in Shenandoah National Park. The Sperryville Community Alliance has created two walking trails along the Thornton River. Three foxhunting associations are active in the county, the Rappahannock Hunt, the Old Dominion Hounds, and the Thornton Hill Hounds. Hunting is a popular activity, and in 2020 there were 23 bears and 1,848 white-tailed deer harvested in the county.

The county is a popular tourist site. A 31-item Civil War Trails markers system is located throughout the county.

== Notable people ==
- Charles T. "Chuck" Akre, investor, financier and businessman; founder, chairman, and chief investment officer of Akre Capital Management, FBR Focus, and other funds
- Ned Bittinger, portrait painter and illustrator
- Edward Dolnick, nonfiction author
- Frederick Hart, American sculptor
- Ben Jones, former U.S. representative from Georgia; played Cooter on the television show, The Dukes of Hazzard
- James Kilpatrick, former columnist
- Lorin Maazel, Pittsburgh Symphony director
- Ronald F. Maxwell, film director and screenwriter whose films include the American Civil War historical fiction films Gettysburg, Gods and Generals, and Copperhead
- Eugene McCarthy, Former Senator
- Patrick O’Connell, chef and owner of the internationally renowned The Inn at Little Washington
- Mary Virginia Proctor, journalist, philanthropist, social activist
- John Fox Sullivan, former publisher at large, Atlantic Media; former mayor of Washington, Virginia

== See also ==
- National Register of Historic Places listings in Rappahannock County, Virginia
