= Hurricane Katrina tornado outbreak =

August 2005 tornado outbreak in southeastern United States

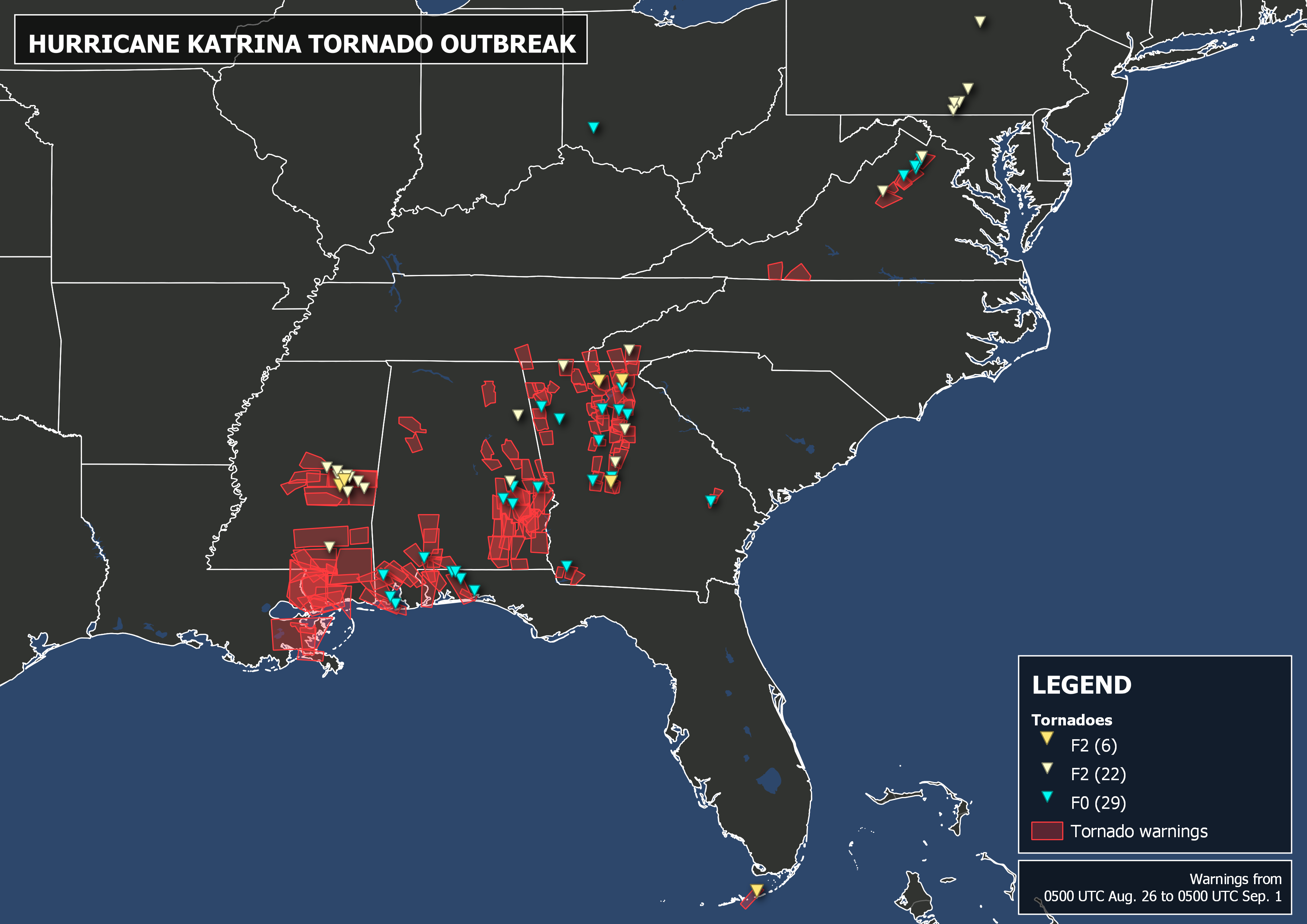
- A cumulative map of all tornadoes and tornado warnings throughout the outbreak

Meteorological history
- Duration: August 26–31, 2005

Tornado outbreak
- Tornadoes: 57 confirmed (Record for a continuous outbreak in August)
- Max. rating: F2 tornado
- Duration: 4 days, 22 hours, and 15 minutes

Overall effects
- Fatalities: 1
- Injuries: 9
- Damage: $23.1 million (2005 USD) (Note: All damage totals are in 2005 USD.)
- Areas affected: Southeastern United States, Mid-Atlantic states
- Part of the tornado outbreaks of 2005

Accompanying Hurricane Katrina's catastrophic coastal impacts was a moderate tornado outbreak spawned by the cyclone's outer bands. The event spanned August 26–31, 2005, with 57 tornadoes touching down across 8 states. One person died and numerous communities suffered damage of varying degrees from central Mississippi to Pennsylvania, with Georgia sustaining record monetary damage for the month of August. Due to extreme devastation in coastal areas of Louisiana and Mississippi, multiple tornadoes may have been overlooked—overshadowed by the effects of storm surge and large-scale wind—and thus the full extent of the hurricane's tornado outbreak is uncertain. Furthermore, an indeterminate number of waterspouts likely formed throughout the life cycle of Hurricane Katrina.

The outbreak began with an isolated F2 over the Florida Keys on August 26; no tornadoes were recorded the following day as the storm traversed the Gulf of Mexico. Four weak tornadoes were observed on August 28 as the hurricane approached land, each causing little damage. Coincident with Katrina's landfall, activity began in earnest on August 29 with numerous tornadoes touching down across Gulf Coast states. Georgia suffered the greatest impact on this day, with multiple F1 and F2 tornadoes causing significant damage; one person died in Carroll County, marking the first known instance of a tornado-related death in the state during August. A record 18 tornadoes touched down across Georgia on August 29, far exceeding the previous daily record of just 2 tornadoes for the month throughout the state. Activity diminished over the subsequent two days as the former hurricane moved northward. Several more tornadoes touched down across the Mid-Atlantic states before the cessation of the outbreak just after midnight local time on August 31.

== Background ==
Hurricane Katrina began as a tropical depression on August 23 near the Bahamas. Moving northwest, the intensifying system was named Katrina the next day; it proceeded to make landfall on the southern tip of Florida as a Category 1 hurricane, causing extensive damage. In crossing Florida, the hurricane weakened to a tropical storm; however, the warm waters of the Gulf of Mexico allowed it to rapidly intensify to the seventh-strongest Atlantic hurricane on record. (Note: Tropical cyclone records in the Atlantic basin go back to 1851.) Afterward, Katrina made landfall as a Category 3 near Buras-Triumph, Louisiana on August 29, and once more near the Mississippi–Louisiana border. Katrina progressed northward through the Central United States and finally dissipated on August 31 near the Great Lakes, when it was absorbed by a cold front. Throughout its path, Katrina was responsible for $125 billion in damage and 1,245–1,836 fatalities. These ranked it as the costliest natural disaster in United States' history and the deadliest since a hurricane in 1928.

Small-scale, transient supercells embedded within the outer bands of the hurricane produced numerous tornadoes throughout its path. Unlike supercells over the Great Plains, these storms last no more than a few hours and are often training. Most of the tornadoes occurred in the hurricane's right-front quadrant, where strong low-level wind shear, high moisture content, and low convective available potential energy combined to produce locally favorable tornadic conditions. A study in 2008 conducted through the American Geophysical Union found that the majority of Katrina-related supercells developed inland over the Gulf Coast rather than offshore, a finding contrary to multiple studies of prior tropical cyclones.

== Daily statistics ==
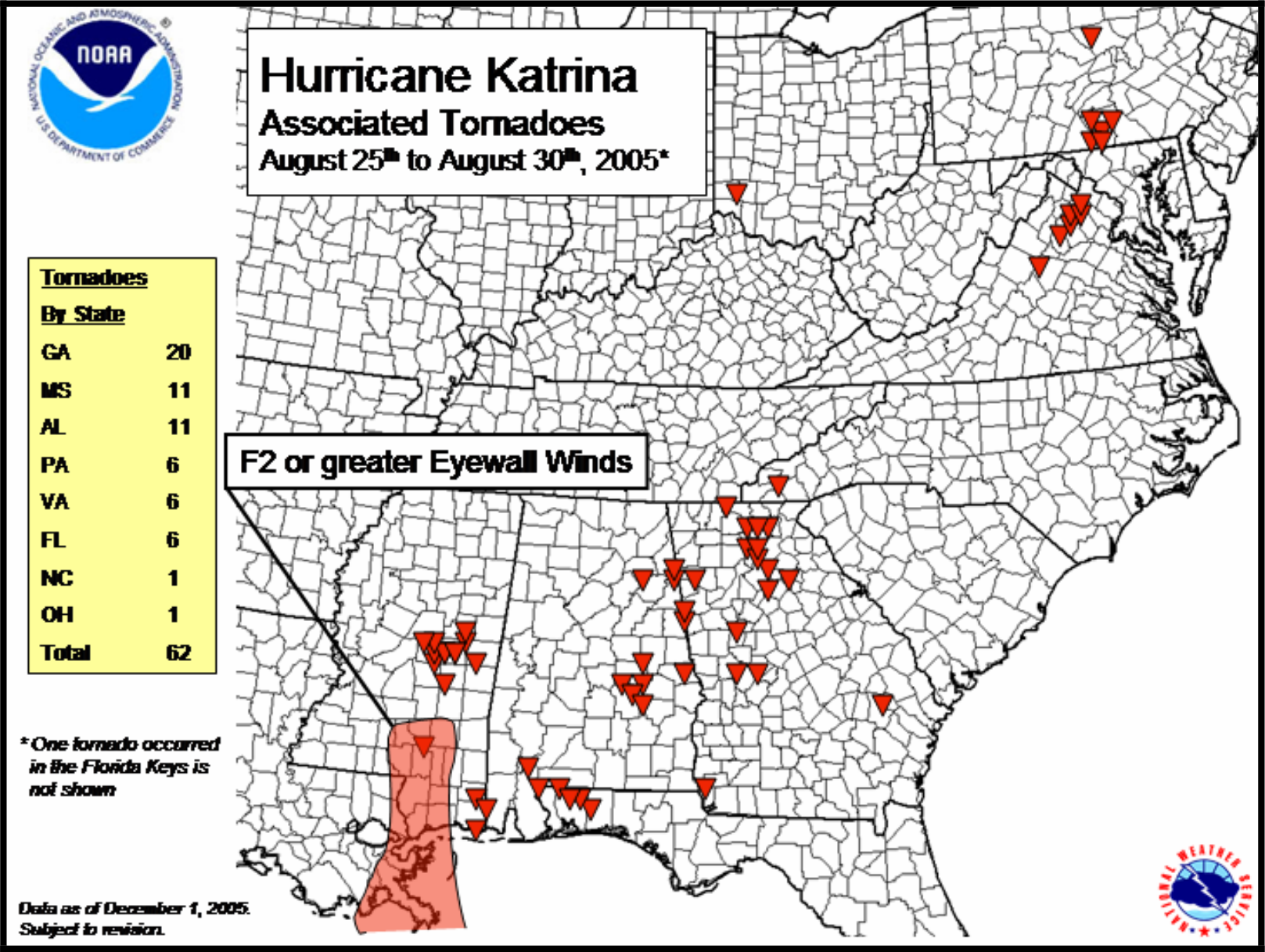
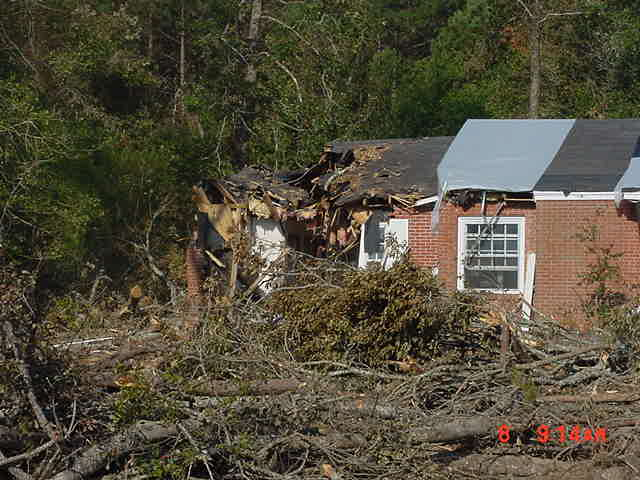
A map of preliminary tornado reports (left) (Note: The map of preliminary reports does not take into account storm surveys and possible duplicate reports. The totals listed on the map differ from the final tally accordingly.) in association with Hurricane Katrina and significant damage to a home (right) in Newton County, Mississippi, from one of the tornadoes. The red shaded region on the map indicates locations that likely experienced wind gusts of 113 mph (182 km/h) or higher; the scale of hurricane-related damage in these areas may have led to tornadoes being missed in post-storm surveys.

Daily statistics of tornadoes produced by Hurricane Katrina (Note: All dates are based on the local time zone where the tornado touched down; however, all times are in Coordinated Universal Time for consistency.)
Date	Total	Fujita scale rating						Deaths	Injuries	Damage	Ref.
Date	Total	F0	F1	F2	F3	F4	F5	Deaths	Injuries	Damage	Ref.
August 26	1	0	0	1	0	0	0	0	0	$5,000,000	
August 27	0	0	0	0	0	0	0	0	0	$0	
August 28	4	4	0	0	0	0	0	0	0	$19,000	
August 29	39	20	14	5	0	0	0	1	9	$15,932,000	
August 30	11	5	6	0	0	0	0	0	0	$2,135,000	
August 31	2	0	2	0	0	0	0	0	0	—N/a	
Total	57	29	22	6	0	0	0	1	9	$23,086,000	

== List of tornadoes ==
List of tornadoes produced by Hurricane Katrina
F#	Location	County / Parish	State	Start coord.	Date	Time (UTC)	Path length	Max width	Summary
F2	Marathon	Monroe	FL	24.70°N 81.08333°W	August 26	0845–0847	1.5 miles (2.4 km)	20 yards (18 m)	The first tornado spawned by Katrina touched down near Marathon. The small tornado traveled toward the northeast, crossing U.S. Route 1 before moving through the Marathon Airport; it subsequently moved over Florida Bay before dissipating. A concrete block residential building was shifted off its foundation, another home was shifted on its pilings and steel beams at the Marathon Airport were bent. One boat was sunk in a canal. Numerous trees sustained damage along its path. Total losses from the tornado reached $5 million.
No tornadoes touched down on August 27
F0	Semmes	Mobile	AL	30.78333°N 88.25°W	August 28	2054–2056	1 mile (1.6 km)	30 yards (27 m)	A weak tornado downed several trees and power lines near Semmes; damage was estimated at $5,000.
F0	E of Fort Morgan	Baldwin	AL	30.23333°N 88.01667°W	August 28	0004–0006	0.5 miles (0.80 km)	30 yards (27 m)	A weak tornado downed several trees and power lines just east of Fort Morgan; damage was estimated at $4,000.
F0	Alabama Port	Mobile	AL	30.36667°N 88.11667°W	August 28	0022–0024	0.5 miles (0.80 km)	30 yards (27 m)	A waterspout developed over Mobile Bay and moved onshore near Alabama Port. The tornado downed several trees and power lines along its path; damage was estimated at $5,000.
F0	Valparaiso	Okaloosa	FL	30.48333°N 86.5°W	August 28	0230–0232	0.5 miles (0.80 km)	30 yards (27 m)	A weak tornado downed several trees and power lines near Valparaiso; damage was estimated at $5,000.
F0	W of Munson	Santa Rosa, Escambia	FL	30.85°N 86.93333°W	August 29	1205–1209	4 miles (6.4 km)	30 yards (27 m)	A weak tornado touched down near State Road 4 and rapidly tracked northwest, dissipating southeast of Century. Multiple trees and power lines were downed along its path; damage was estimated at $13,000.
F0	S of Huxford	Escambia	AL	31.11667°N 87.46667°W	August 29	1230–1232	2 miles (3.2 km)	30 yards (27 m)	A weak tornado touched down near Interstate 65 and State Route 21 and tracked northwest. Effects were limited to downed trees and power lines; damage was estimated at $5,000.
F0	Holt	Okaloosa	FL	30.71667°N 86.76667°W	August 29	1342–1344	1 mile (1.6 km)	30 yards (27 m)	A weak tornado downed several trees and power lines near Holt; damage was estimated at $5,000.
F0	S of Munson	Santa Rosa	FL	30.85°N 86.86667°W	August 29	1347–1349	1 mile (1.6 km)	30 yards (27 m)	A weak tornado downed several trees and power lines just south of Munson; damage was estimated at $5,000.
F1	E of Hattiesburg	Forrest	MS	31.31667°N 89.28333°W	August 29	1625–1626	0.5 miles (0.80 km)	50 yards (46 m)	A tornado embedded in the eyewall of Katrina snapped or uprooted dozens of trees just east of Hattiesburg. Damage was estimated at $17,000.
F1	N of Chunky	Newton	MS	32.38333°N 88.93333°W	August 29	1700–1712	13 miles (21 km)	100 yards (91 m)	A tornado downed numerous trees and caused minor roof damage to several homes. Losses amounted to $400,000.
F2	NNE of Decatur	Newton	MS	32.48333°N 89.08333°W	August 29	1706–1707	1 mile (1.6 km)	75 yards (69 m)	A brief but strong tornado uprooted or damaged nearly every tree in a 0.5 mi (0.80 km) area along Good Hope Road; most of these were 3–4 ft (0.9–1 m) in diameter. One home in the area sustained minor roof damage. Losses amounted to $200,000.
F1	NE of Meridian	Lauderdale	MS	32.45°N 88.61667°W	August 29	1714–1716	3 miles (4.8 km)	75 yards (69 m)	A tornado developed along U.S. Highway 45 and entered undeveloped areas. Numerous trees were snapped or uprooted and several power lines were downed. Damage was estimated at $95,000.
F1	NE of Shucktown	Lauderdale, Kemper	MS	32.58333°N 88.73333°W	August 29	1722–1725	3 miles (4.8 km)	50 yards (46 m)	A tornado touched down near Highway 493 and moved west-northwest, dissipating west-southwest of Prismatic. Numerous trees were snapped or uprooted and several outbuildings sustained damage. Losses amounted to $175,000.
F2	S of House	Neshoba	MS	32.58333°N 89.0°W	August 29	1727–1730	3 miles (4.8 km)	100 yards (91 m)	A strong tornado touched down south of House and snapped or uprooted numerous trees. Multiple homes and outbuildings sustained collateral damage from the fallen trees. Losses amounted to $470,000.
F1	NE of McDonald	Neshoba	MS	32.68333°N 89.11667°W	August 29	1736–1739	3 miles (4.8 km)	75 yards (69 m)	A tornado touched down northeast of McDonald and downed numerous trees and power lines along its path. Damage was estimated at $150,000.
F1	W of Damascus	Kemper, Neshoba	MS	32.66667°N 88.9°W	August 29	1739–1743	3 miles (4.8 km)	50 yards (46 m)	A tornado touched down along the Kemper–Neshoba border and moved west-northwest. Numerous trees and power lines were downed along its path; damage was estimated at $180,000.
F1	W of DeWeese	Neshoba	MS	32.7°N 88.95°W	August 29	1748–1752	4 miles (6.4 km)	150 yards (140 m)	A tornado touched down near Highway 491 and tracked west-northwest. Numerous trees and power lines were downed along its path; one mobile home was destroyed by fallen trees and another sustained major damage. Losses amounted to $400,000.
F1	NW of Philadelphia	Neshoba	MS	32.78333°N 89.13333°W	August 29	1805–1808	2 miles (3.2 km)	75 yards (69 m)	A tornado touched down near Highway 15, just south of the Philadelphia Municipal Airport, and tracked northwest. Damage was limited to downed trees and losses amounted to $65,000.
F1	N of Edinburg	Leake	MS	32.85°N 89.33333°W	August 29	1821–1823	2 miles (3.2 km)	75 yards (69 m)	A tornado touched down north of Edinburg and downed multiple trees along its westward course. Damage was estimated at $85,000.
F1	SW of Reeltown	Tallapoosa	AL	32.58333°N 85.81667°W	August 29	1855–1858	3.25 miles (5.23 km)	300 yards (270 m)	A tornado touched down just east of State Route 49 and traveled northwest. Numerous trees were snapped or uprooted along the path and several homes sustained varying degrees of damage. Losses amounted to $70,000.
F0	W of Mitchell	Bullock, Montgomery	AL	32.25°N 85.95°W	August 29	2016–2025	5.94 miles (9.56 km)	300 yards (270 m)	A tornado touched down just west of Mitchell and moved northwest, crossing State Route 110 before entering Montgomery County. It later dissipated to the north-northeast of Cecil. Numerous trees were snapped or uprooted along the path and several homes sustained varying degrees of damage. Losses amounted to $190,000.
F2	Glenloch to NE of Roopville	Heard, Carroll	GA	32.55°N 83.88333°W	August 29	2024–2038	5.5 miles (8.9 km)	200 yards (180 m)	1 death - The only fatal tornado of the outbreak touched down 0.25 mi (0.40 km) south of Glenloch and tracked north at 30–35 mph (48–56 km/h). Several homes in the town sustained significant damage; three people were injured when the roof of their home collapsed. The tornado soon entered Carroll County and moved through primarily agricultural areas, resulting in extensive damage. Seventeen chicken coops were destroyed, killing approximately 1 million chickens. Numerous other livestock, including cattle and horses, died along the storm's path. A man was killed while stepping out of his house as the tornado struck. This marked the first instance of a tornado-related fatality in Georgia during August on record. The tornado "completely obliterated" a mobile home near Roopville before dissipating. In all, 30 homes sustained moderate damage and 100 others sustained minor damage. Multiple vehicles were also damaged or destroyed. Total losses from the tornado amounted to $4.4 million.
F0	W of Union Springs	Bullock	AL	32.15°N 85.76667°W	August 29	2030	0.2 miles (0.32 km)	25 yards (23 m)	A brief tornado touched down near the intersection of State Route 110 and U.S. Route 82. It remained over rural areas and caused little to no damage.
F1	SW of Piedmont	Calhoun	AL	33.85°N 85.66667°W	August 29	2053–2056	1.52 miles (2.45 km)	30 yards (27 m)	A tornado touched down just east of State Route 9 and moved northwest, dissipating minutes later. Five homes and numerous trees were damaged along its path. Losses amounted to $115,000.
F0	New Georgia	Paulding	GA	33.78°N 84.87°W	August 29	2115–2117	1 mile (1.6 km)	50 yards (46 m)	A weak tornado touched down in the New Georgia Meadows subdivision and traveled northwest through residential areas. The tornado caused minor to moderate damage to 45 homes and 12 vehicles; no structures were rendered uninhabitable. Losses amounted to $400,000.
F0	SE of Felton	Haralson	GA	33.96667°N 84.05°W	August 29	2115–2117	1 mile (1.6 km)	75 yards (69 m)	A brief tornado touched down in extreme northern Haralson County and tracked through mostly forested areas; one barn was destroyed. Damage was estimated at $5,000. This tornado was produced by the same thunderstorm that spawned the F2 Heard–Carroll tornado.
F0	NW of Tuskegee	Macon	AL	32.48333°N 85.76667°W	August 29	2119–2124	3 miles (4.8 km)	400 yards (370 m)	A tornado touched down near the intersection of State Route 199 and County Road 27; it tracked northwest through a forested region, snapping or uprooting numerous trees along its path. Damage was estimated at $30,000.
F1	E of Cedartown	Polk	GA	32.95°N 83.8°W	August 29	2124–2130	2.8 miles (4.5 km)	50 yards (46 m)	A tornado caused significant damage to a gas station and flattened nearby brick storage units. Numerous trees and power lines were downed and a billboard along U.S. Route 27 was bent to the ground. A Wal-Mart store in east Cedartown sustained minor damage. Losses amounted to $50,000.
F0	S of Silver City	Forsyth	GA	34.01667°N 85.21667°W	August 29	2215–2216	0.5 miles (0.80 km)	50 yards (46 m)	A brief tornado touched down in a small subdivision south of Silver City, damaging four homes in the area. Two of the structures had wood siding torn off and windows blown out. Several large oak and pecan trees were downed. Damage was estimated at $250,000.
F0	S of Brinson	Decatur	GA	30.95°N 84.73333°W	August 29	2226–2232	3 miles (4.8 km)	50 yards (46 m)	A tornado was reported by the public crossing U.S. Route 84; no damage was observed.
F0	SSW of Bogart	Oconee	GA	33.36667°N 84.11667°W	August 29	2235	0.1 miles (0.16 km)	25 yards (23 m)	A brief tornado touched down just south of State Route 53. Ten trees were downed and one home sustained moderate roof damage. Losses amounted to $10,000.
F1	Fickling Mill	Taylor	GA	34.8°N 84.8°W	August 29	2237–2245	3.5 miles (5.6 km)	250 yards (230 m)	A tornado touched down just south of Fickling Mill and tracked northwest; two homes were destroyed at the formation point. A man was injured when power lines fell on his truck. Elsewhere in Fickling Mill, one mobile home was destroyed and eight other homes sustained minor roof damage. Hundreds of trees were snapped or uprooted along the tornado's path; a large pecan orchard near State Route 137 was severely affected. The tornado ultimately dissipated near the Flint River along the Taylor–Upson county border. Damage was estimated at $750,000.
F0	W of Phenix City	Russell	AL	32.46667°N 85.28333°W	August 29	2241	0.1 miles (0.16 km)	25 yards (23 m)	A brief tornado downed a few trees.
F0	N of Burtsboro	Lumpkin	GA	33.95°N 83.73333°W	August 29	2245–2250	0.9 miles (1.4 km)	25 yards (23 m)	A brief tornado touched down just north of State Route 9 and moved north-northwest. Damage was primarily to a nursery business, including a greenhouse and 30 trees. Losses amounted to $45,000.
F0	N of Bellville	Evans	GA	32.2°N 81.96667°W	August 29	2306	0.1 miles (0.16 km)	20 yards (18 m)	A brief tornado touched down over a corn field and caused no damage.
F2	Fort Valley	Peach	GA	34.5°N 83.66667°W	August 29	2310–2317	4 miles (6.4 km)	50 yards (46 m)	A tornado touched down just south of Fort Valley and tracked northward into the city. Multiple homes and businesses sustained varying degrees of damage, several of which were later condemned. The most severe effects were felt along Taylor's Mill Road. Hundreds of trees were uprooted and a pecan orchard was destroyed. Three people sustained minor injuries in the city. Damage amounted to $2.6 million.
F0	S of Loving	Fannin	GA	32.66667°N 83.86667°W	August 29	2345–2346	0.25 miles (0.40 km)	100 yards (91 m)	A brief tornado touched down just south of Loving, beginning over a local church; the structure sustained moderate roof damage. Dozens of trees were uprooted along the tornado's path, resulting in moderate collateral damage to two homes. Several other structures had their shingles blown off. Damage was estimated at $250,000.
F1	N of Orchard Hill	Spalding	GA	33.58333°N 83.61667°W	August 29	2345–2347	1 mile (1.6 km)	100 yards (91 m)	A tornado touched down north of Orchard Hill and tracked north. A small home was destroyed and two people in it were injured. A house which was under-construction suffered major damage, and several others experienced minor damage. A horse trailer was thrown about 200 yd (180 m) and numerous trees were downed. Losses amounted to $300,000.
F0	Social Circle	Walton	GA	33.86667°N 83.56667°W	August 29	0225–0226	0.25 miles (0.40 km)	50 yards (46 m)	A brief tornado touched down in Social Circle and caused minor damage to several homes. Dozens of trees were downed, with collateral damage occurring to multiple structures. Downed power lines left 1,800 households without electricity. Losses amounted to $25,000.
F0	Fort Yargo State Park	Barrow	GA	33.95°N 83.73°W	August 29	0305–0309	1.5 miles (2.4 km)	100 yards (91 m)	A tornado touched down in the middle of Fort Yargo State Park and tracked northwest, crossing Masseys Lake before dissipating near the park's western entrance. Between 800 and 900 trees were uprooted and several camp sites sustained minor damage. In nearby Bethlehem, several chicken houses and outbuildings were affected. Damage was estimated at $150,000.
F0	SE of Braselton	Jackson	GA	32.6°N 84.23333°W	August 29	0325–0326	1 mile (1.6 km)	20 yards (18 m)	A brief tornado downed dozens of trees and caused minor damage to a few homes. Losses amounted to $20,000.
F0	S of Lula to Rogers Mill	Hall, White	GA	34.37°N 83.67°W	August 29	0410–0432	11 miles (18 km)	50 yards (46 m)	A tornado touched down just south of Lula and tracked north-northwest. Hundreds of trees and multiple power lines were downed along the tornado's path, with the heaviest damage concentrated along a 6 mi (9.7 km) stretch near Lula. Eighteen homes sustained minor to moderate damage, all of them in Hull County. The tornado dissipated west-southwest of Mossy Creek shortly after crossing State Route 254. Damage was estimated at $255,000.
F2	Helen	White	GA	34.48333°N 84.11667°W	August 29	0430–0440	5 miles (8.0 km)	300 yards (270 m)	The final Georgia tornado of the outbreak touched down about 3 mi (4.8 km) south-southeast of Helen and moved along a northerly path, parallel with State Route 75. The tornado moved through downtown Helen and caused major damage to multiple homes and businesses. The Helen Econo Lodge had almost its entire second floor blown away, with only the interior bathrooms left standing. A nearby chapel was destroyed and a Ferris wheel was crumpled. Hundreds of trees were downed along with large stretches of power lines, forcing the closure of State Route 75 north and south of the city and leaving residents without power for two days. Damage from the tornado amounted to $3 million.
F0	SSE of Morrow	Warren	OH	39.36667°N 84.21667°W	August 30	2045–2048	2 miles (3.2 km)	300 yards (270 m)	A weak tornado uprooted several trees and caused minor roof damage to one home.
F0	E of Haywood	Madison	VA	38.45°N 78.26667°W	August 30	2251–2252	0.5 miles (0.80 km)	50 yards (46 m)	A brief tornado touched down just east of Haywood, near the intersections of Routes 609 and 602. About a dozen trees and a few power lines were downed along its path. Damage was estimated at $10,000.
F1	N of White Hall	Albemarle	VA	38.15°N 78.66667°W	August 30	2305–2307	1 mile (1.6 km)	100 yards (91 m)	A tornado touched down along the southeastern slope of Pasture Fence Mountain and tracked west. Numerous trees were snapped or uprooted and a resident reported seeing debris lofted 300 ft (91 m) in the air. Damage was estimated at $500,000. The full extent of the tornado is unknown as ground survey teams could not access rugged terrain closer to White Hall where the tornado may have tracked.
F0	W of Eggbornsville	Culpeper	VA	38.58333°N 78.03333°W	August 30	2330–2332	0.5 miles (0.80 km)	75 yards (69 m)	A brief tornado touched down just west of Eggbornsville and downed several trees. It dissipated shortly after crossing the Hazel River. Survey teams noted that the tornado may have reformed and become the 2335 UTC Viewtown tornado; however, data was inconclusive.
F0	Viewtown	Rappahannock	VA	38.63333°N 78.05°W	August 30	2335–2350	4 miles (6.4 km)	75 yards (69 m)	A tornado touched down near Viewtown and tracked east-northeast. Metal roofing was torn off an outbuilding and several small trees were downed in this area. The tornado crossed U.S. Route 211 and soon dissipated near Jefferson Mountain. Damage was estimated at $50,000.
F0	NE of Orlean	Fauquier	VA	38.76667°N 77.93333°W	August 30	0008–0010	0.8 miles (1.3 km)	75 yards (69 m)	A brief tornado downed several trees, one of which fell on a building. Damage was estimated at $50,000.
F1	S of Ada to W of Marshall	Fauquier	VA	38.81667°N 77.91667°W	August 30	0017–0030	5 miles (8.0 km)	100 yards (91 m)	A tornado touched down south of Ada and tracked north-northeast. Numerous trees were snapped or uprooted along its path; 15 buildings sustained collateral damage from fallen trees. A few outbuildings were destroyed as a direct result of the tornado while direct damage to homes was limited to roofing and siding. Losses amounted to $1.5 million.
F1	SW of Franklin	Macon	NC	35.1°N 83.53333°W	August 30	0030	0.1 miles (0.16 km)	50 yards (46 m)	A brief tornado downed 30–40 trees near Standing Indian Campground.
F1	ESE of Fountain Dale	Adams	PA	39.7°N 77.31667°W	August 30	0422–0426	3 miles (4.8 km)	200 yards (180 m)	A tornado touched down near Route 16, just north of the Pennsylvania–Maryland border, and tracked northeast. Numerous trees were snapped or uprooted along its path. Several barns and outbuildings sustained moderate damage and a few homes experienced minor siding or roofing loss. A 7,000 lb (3,200 kg) horse trailer was overturned and moved several feet by the tornado.
F1	NE of Gettysburg to Heidlersburg	Adams	PA	39.86667°N 77.2°W	August 30	0438–0450	7 miles (11 km)	300 yards (270 m)	A tornado touched down just northeast of Gettysburg, near the intersection of Route 15 and Route 30, and tracked northeast. It moved along an intermittent course, ultimately terminating close to Route 234 near Heidlersburg. Several barns were destroyed by the tornado and multiple other structures sustained varying degrees of damage.
F1	Franklin Township	Adams	PA	39.85°N 77.3°W	August 30	0440–0445	3 miles (4.8 km)	50 yards (46 m)	A tornado touched down near Route 30 and tracked north-northeast, crossing through Mummasburg before dissipating near Conewago Creek. Damage was primarily light, with several homes and a church sustaining superficial impacts; a dozen trees were uprooted near Mummasburg.
F1	Dillsburg	York, Cumberland	PA	40.11667°N 77.03333°W	August 31	0517–0522	2.5 miles (4.0 km)	100 yards (91 m)	A tornado touched down just south of the Rose Garden subdivision and moved north, crossing Yellow Breeches Creek before dissipating about 0.5 mi (0.80 km) west of Route 15. Numerous trees were snapped or uprooted along its path. Structural damage was minimal and limited to siding and shingles.
F1	Plunketts Creek Township	Lycoming	PA	41.4°N 76.8°W	August 31	0855–0857	0.75 miles (1.21 km)	100 yards (91 m)	A brief tornado, embedded within a larger area of straight-line winds, touched down just southeast of Barbours within Plunketts Creek Township and traveled northeast. The tornado moved through a heavily forested area and caused no structural damage.

== See also ==
- List of North American tornadoes and tornado outbreaks
- List of tornadoes spawned by tropical cyclones
- Meteorological history of Hurricane Katrina
