= Edward Pawley =

American actor (1901–1988)

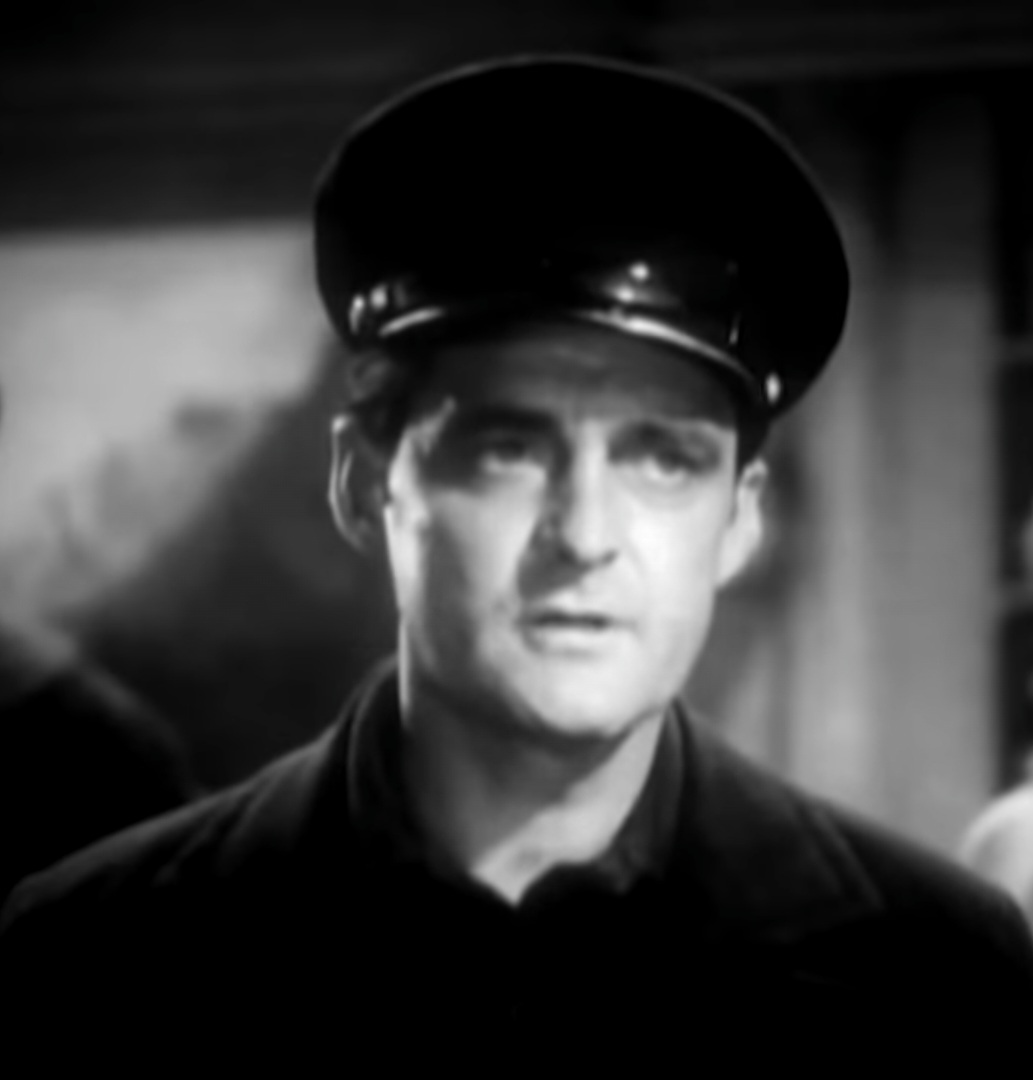
- Pawley in Prison Break (1938)
- Born: Edward Joel Pawley; March 16, 1901; Kansas City, Missouri, U.S.
- Died: January 27, 1988 (aged 86); Charlottesville, Virginia, U.S.
- Years active: 1919–1951
- Spouses: Martina May Martin (m. 1922; div. 1929) Helen Shipman (m. 1937; died 1984)
- Children: 1

Edward Joel Pawley (March 16, 1901 – January 27, 1988) was an American actor of radio, films and Broadway. The full name on his birth certificate is Edward Joel Stone Pawley; he never used the Stone name, which derived from a Stone family in Illinois.

== Early years ==
At maturity, Pawley was 5'10" tall with thick black hair and blue eyes. While in high school, he became interested in both journalism and acting. Acting won out after taking drama classes and appearing in high school plays. He moved to New York City in 1920 to pursue a career in the theater.

== Broadway ==
Pawley began his theatrical career in 1920 and reached the Broadway stage in 1923 in The Shame Woman. He went on to star in various well-known Broadway plays, including Elmer Gantry (1928), Processional (1928), Subway Express (1929), Two Seconds (1931), Life Begins (1932) and The Willow and I (1942). Pawley's rich, baritone voice was hailed by leading journalists of the day, including Walter Winchell and Heywood Hale Broun. Although he was probably best known in the theater for his portrayal of Elmer Gantry in the Broadway play of the same name, it was his portrayal of John Allen in Two Seconds that brought him to the attention of Hollywood by way of Warner Brothers. Winchell wrote that Pawley received a standing ovation after his opening night performance in the 1931 play Two Seconds.

== Hollywood ==
Not long after sound film came into vogue, Pawley left the theater in 1932 and went to Hollywood where he performed in over 50 movies during a relatively brief (for Hollywood) ten-year span. He had feature roles in such movies as The Hoosier Schoolboy with Mickey Rooney, G Men with James Cagney, The Oklahoma Kid with Cagney and Humphrey Bogart, King Solomon of Broadway with Edmund Lowe and Louise Henry, Each Dawn I Die with George Raft and Cagney, Tom Sawyer, Detective with Janet Waldo and Donald O'Connor and Romance on the Range with Roy Rogers and Gabby Hayes. He played mostly "bad guy" roles in gangster, horror, comedy and Western films. He became friends with Cagney (with whom he made five movies), Jackie Cooper (four movies) and Francis Lederer. One of his earliest friends in the entertainment industry was Arthur Hughes, who played Bill Davidson on the long-running radio show Just Plain Bill. Hughes also acted in some Broadway plays and was Pawley's best man at his wedding in 1922 to stage actress Martina May Martin.

== Radio ==
Pawley became disenchanted with Hollywood during the attempted infiltration by the communists in the late 1930s and early 1940s and left in 1942. He returned briefly to Broadway, where he starred with Gregory Peck in what was Peck's second Broadway play titled The Willow and I. In the 1930s, Pawley had performed leading romantic roles on The Collier Hour radio program. He resumed work in radio after returning to New York City. He played opposite Lucille Wall in the radio soap opera Portia Faces Life as "Love Story Boy and Girl." Later in 1943, Pawley played Steve Wilson on the radio drama series Big Town, replacing Edward G. Robinson, who had played the role from 1937–42 when the show was produced in Hollywood. Wilson's sidekick on Big Town was "girl reporter" Lorelei Kilbourne, played by Fran Carlon. Pawley had performed with Robinson in 1926 in a comedy play titled "The Stolen Lady" at "Werba's Brooklyn Theater".

During Pawley's eight-year reign, Big Town achieved the number one rating for reporter-type radio drama shows. In the January 1948 Nielson ratings, the show was ranked #12 among all radio programs, ahead of such popular shows as Suspense, Sam Spade, Mr. District Attorney, The FBI in Peace and War, Blondie and Mr. and Mrs. North. It also was in the Top 10 of all radio shows more times than any other that year except for The Bob Hope Show and Fibber McGee and Molly. His audience was estimated at anywhere from 10 to 20 million radio listeners.

== Retirement ==
Pawley left Big Town in 1951 and retired near the small village of Amissville in rural Rappahannock County, Virginia. He had fallen in love with the state while touring with the 1920 play East Is West, his first professional acting role. Pawley would become the quintessential "Virginia gentleman" and was loved for his integrity, patriotism and charm. He was admired for his vocabulary and speaking voice, as well as his status as an entertainer in three different media forms (theater, film, and radio). He raised and sold championship goats, wrote poetry and was a part-time announcer at local radio station WCVA in Culpeper, Virginia. At WCVA, he replaced Robert Gibson Corder, Ph.D. who would, later, research and write Pawley's biography. Pawley became a member of The Lambs (the actor's club) in 1951.

Pawley moved to Rock Mills, Virginia, in the mid-1950s and lived on the original site of the Rock Mill near the confluence of the Thornton and Rush rivers, fulfilling a dream of living close to nature. In addition to a goat farm, he and his wife maintained an organic vegetable farm and produced pesticide-free vegetables, goat milk and cheese. They ran a grocery store, the "Cash and Totem Store", where they sold some of their own produce and his wife sold her "Virginia Honey Girl" line of fruits preserved in honey.

Pawley and his wife were proponents of "back-to-the-earth living with nature" before it became popular.

Pawley died on January 27, 1988, of a heart condition at the University of Virginia Medical Center in Charlottesville, Virginia. He and his second wife had no children, but in his will named Jane, Ross, Kathyrn, Juia, Richard and Robin Rottier as his spiritual children. Both he and his wife, who died in 1984, were cremated and their ashes scattered at their favorite spot, "Roaring Rock", alongside the Rush River, which partially flows through their former estate in Rock Mills. A raised bronze plaque at that site is a memorial to their lives and careers in the entertainment medium.

Pawley had two younger brothers who were also actors, William M. "Bud" Pawley and J. Anthony Pawley. Both acted in Broadway plays and in films, though neither achieved the success and acclaim of their older brother.

== Personal life ==
In 1922, Pawley married his high school sweetheart, Martina May Martin, a professional stage actress. They had one child, Martin Herbert Pawley. They divorced, only to remarry and divorce again. In 1937, Pawley married the then-popular Broadway singer, dancer, and actress Helen Shipman. They remained married for 47 years until her death on April 13, 1984.

== Partial filmography ==
- Thirteen Women (1932) – Chauffeur Burns
- Tess of the Storm Country (1932) – Ben Letts
- Footlight Parade (1933, unbilled)
- Olsen's Big Moment (1933) – Joe 'Monk' West (uncredited)
- Murders in the Zoo (1933) – Bob Taylor (uncredited)
- Bureau of Missing Persons (1933) – Waterfront Diner Wanting Sugar (uncredited)
- Treasure Island (1934) – Pirate of the Spanish Main
- Helldorado (1935, unbilled) – Miner (uncredited)
- Mississippi (1935) – Joe Patterson
- G Men (1935) – Danny Leggett
- Dante's Inferno (1935, unbilled) – Clinton – Ship's Officer (uncredited)
- King Solomon of Broadway (1935) – John 'Ice' Larson
- Tough Guy (1936) – Tony – Gangster
- Sworn Enemy (1936) – 'Dutch' McTurck
- Sinner Take All (1936) – Royce
- Dangerous Number (1937, unbilled) – Second Detective (uncredited)
- Mountain Justice (1937) – Tod Miller
- Hoosier Schoolboy (1937) – Captain Fred Carter
- It Can't Last Forever (1937) – Cronin
- The Last Gangster (1937) – Brockett (uncredited)
- White Banners (1938) – Bill Ellis
- Dangerous to Know (1938) – John Rance
- Gun Law (1938) – The Raven
- You and Me (1938, unbilled) – Dutch (uncredited)
- Romance of the Limberlost (1938) – Corson
- Prison Break (1938) – Joe Fenderson
- Little Tough Guy (1938) – Jim Boylan
- Smashing the Rackets (1938) – Chin Martin
- Sons of the Legion (1938) – Gunman Baker
- Angels with Dirty Faces (1938) – Edwards
- Tom Sawyer, Detective (1938) – Brace Dunlap
- The Oklahoma Kid (1939) – Doolin
- Money to Loan (1939, Short) – Calumette (uncredited)
- The Lady's from Kentucky (1939) – Spike Cronin
- Unmarried (1939) – Swade
- Help Wanted (1939, Short) – Harry
- Each Dawn I Die (1939) – Dale
- The Big Guy (1939) – Buckhart
- Old Hickory (1939, Short) – Minor Role (uncredited)
- Castle on the Hudson (1940) – Black Jack
- River's End (1940) – Frank Crandell
- Flowing Gold (1940) – Collins
- Texas Rangers Ride Again (1940) – Palo Pete
- San Francisco Docks (1940) – Monte March
- Riders of Death Valley (1941, Serial)
- Hit the Road (1941) – Spike the Butcher
- Hold That Ghost (1941) – High Collar (uncredited)
- Treat 'Em Rough (1942) – Martin
- True to the Army (1942) – Junior
- Romance on the Range (1942) – Jerome Banning
- Flight Lieutenant (1942) – Larsen (uncredited)
- Eyes of the Underworld (1943) – Lance Merlin
- The Desperadoes (1943) – Blackie (uncredited) (final film role)
