= Massanova, Virginia =

Unincorporated community in Virginia, US

Coordinates: 38°40′12″N 78°04′38″W

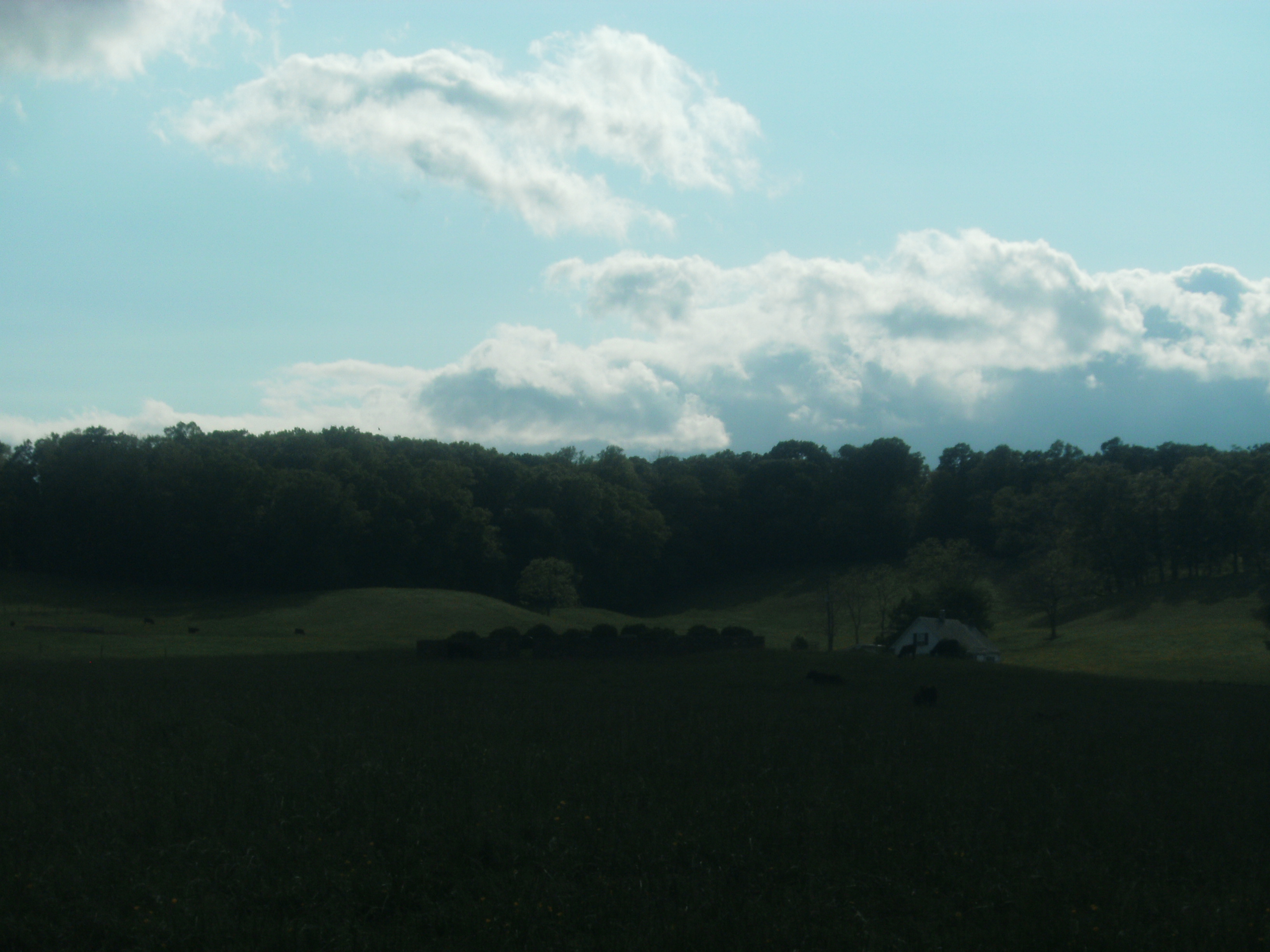
View of the family cemetery and surrounding landscape at Meadow Grove Farm; though listed in Amissville, the property is very near Massanova

Massanova is an unincorporated community in Rappahannock County, in the U.S. state of Virginia.
