= Battle Mountain (Virginia) =

Mountain in Rappahannock County, Virginia

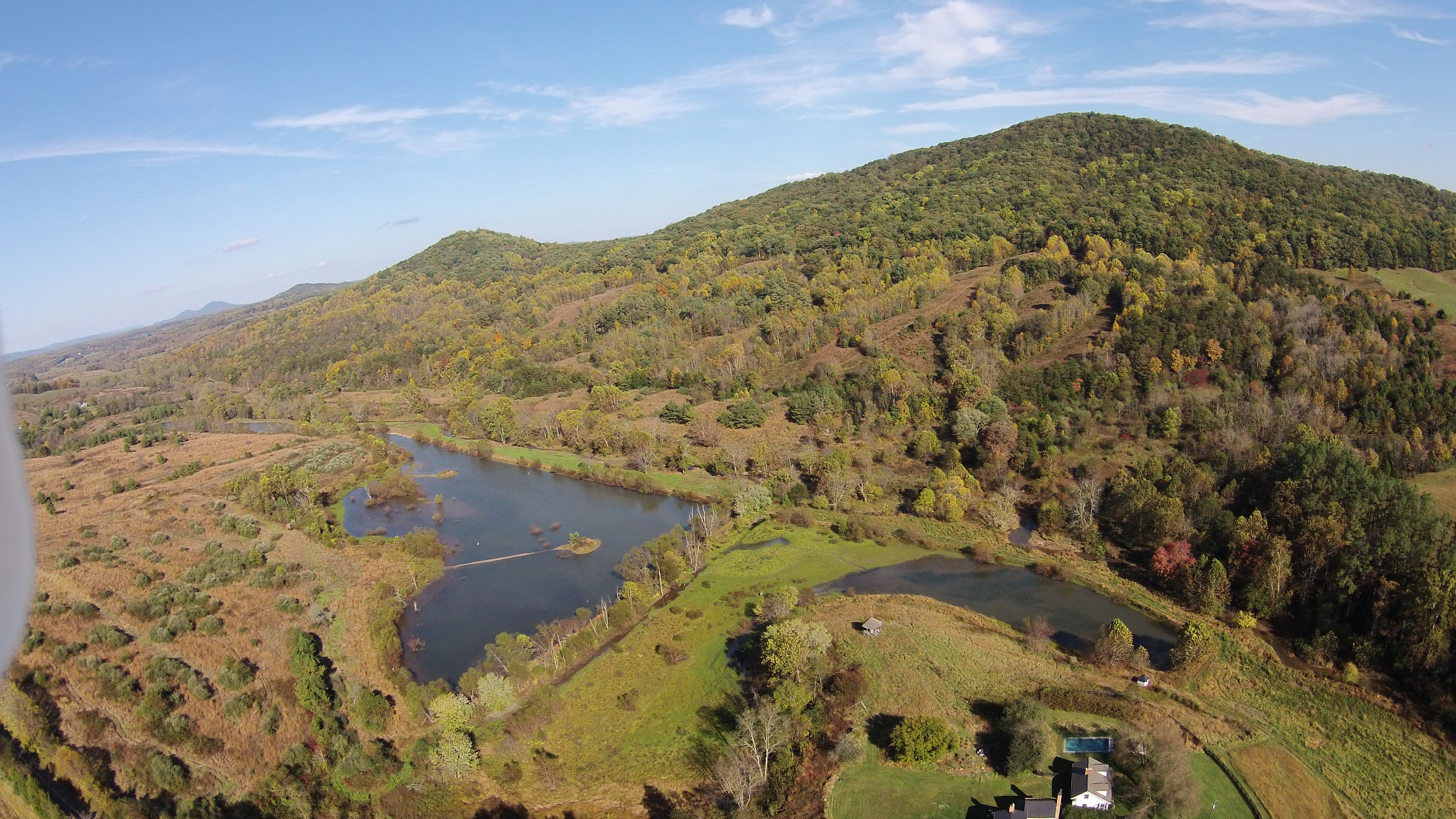
- The western slope of Battle Mountain, Castleton, Virginia

Highest point
- Elevation: 1,162 ft (354 m)
- Prominence: 762 ft (232 m)
- Coordinates: 38°39′26″N 78°3′36″W

Geography
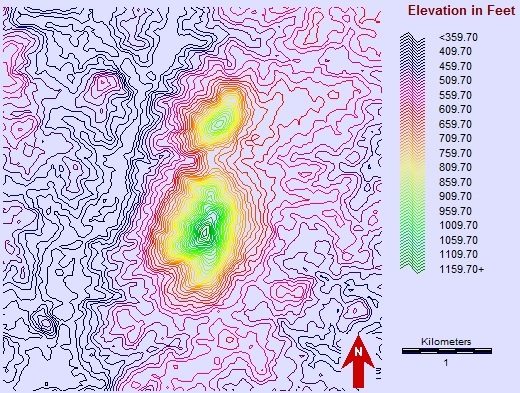
- A digital contour plot of Battle Mountain and Little Battle Mountain, based on digital imagery data from the NASA ASTER satellite. Processed by Thomas A. Woolman, PhD (2020), MBA, MS, MS, in 2015.
- Location: Rappahannock County, Virginia, US
- Parent range: Blue Ridge Mountains
- Topo map(s): USGS Massies Corner, Va.

Geology
- Rock age: 704,000,000 years
- Mountain type: Stratovolcano
- Volcanic belt: Robertson River Igneous Suite
- Last eruption: 704 Mya

Battle Mountain is an igneous mountain in Rappahannock County, Virginia. The eastern slope is generally considered to reside in the unincorporated town of Amissville, Virginia while the western slope is generally considered to be within Castleton, Virginia. The entire mountain including the summit lies within private property at an elevation of 1,162 ft (354.2 m).

== Geology ==
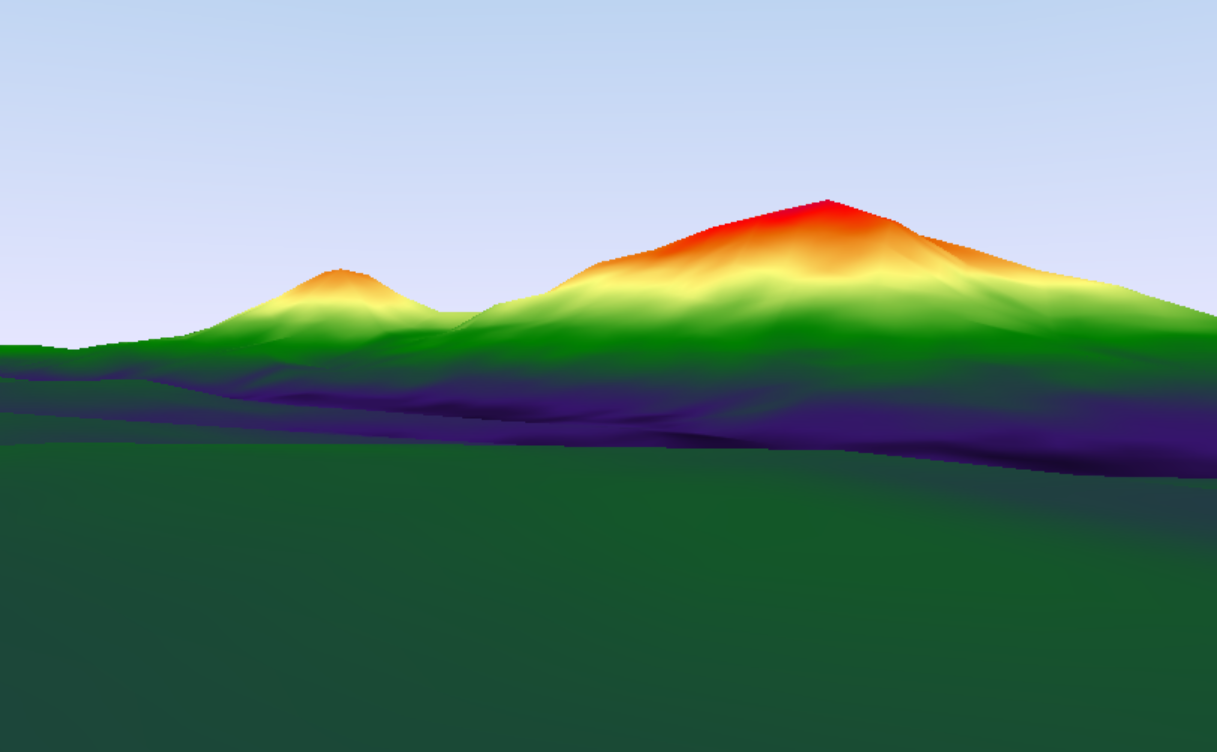
Digital terrain model of the western slopes of Battle Mountain and Little Battle Mountain, generated with data from the NASA ASTER satellite by Woolman (2016).

=== Tectonic emplacement and geochronology ===
It is an extinct volcano dating to the Neoproterozoic and is approximately 704 million years old (+/- 4 million years) as dated using the U-Pb zircon crystal geochronology method. It is a unit of the Robertson River Igneous Suite and is located within the Blue Ridge anticlinorium. This volcanic formation was a result of crustal extensional rifting of the eastern Laurentian margin of the supercontinent Rodinia. This was the beginning of a chain of events that ultimately gave birth to the precursor Atlantic, the Iapetus Ocean at 550 Ma during the Ediacaran–Cambrian transition.

=== Geochemical evolution ===
The volcano is composed of alkali feldspar granitic rock of the Robertson River Igneous Suite. This includes felsic complex material such as biotite, hornblende-biotite, magnetite, and alkali granitic rock including rhyolite on the eastern slopes of Battle Mountain and the adjacent (and geologically related) Little Battle Mountain (elevation 937 feet).

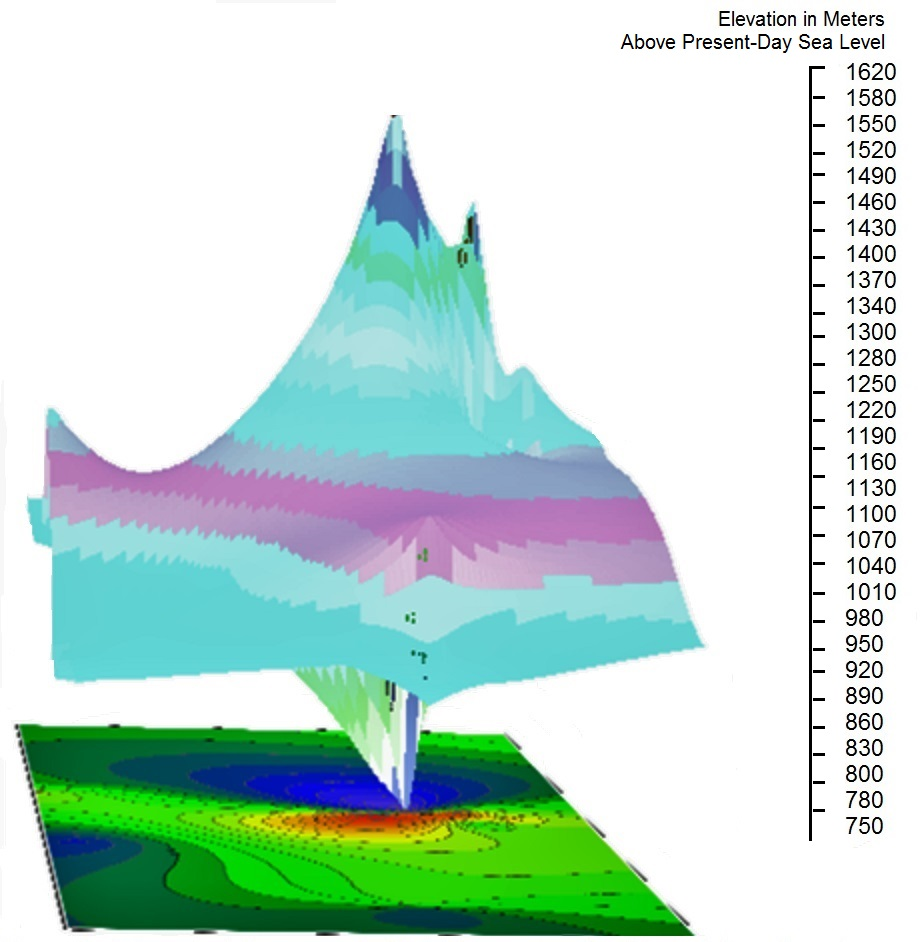
Theorized original appearance of Battle Mountain at 704 million years ago by Woolman (2016). Elevation shown in meters.

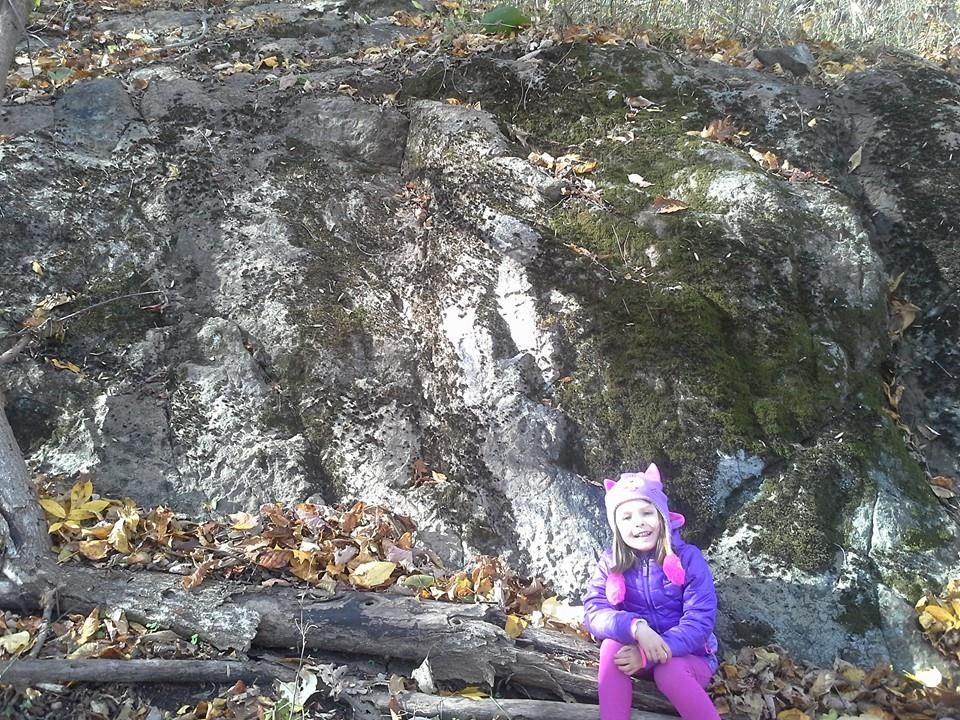
A typical large rhyolite outcrop on the eastern slope of Battle Mountain, at an approximate elevation of 850 feet. Emily J. Woolman (aged 4, 2014) is shown for scale.

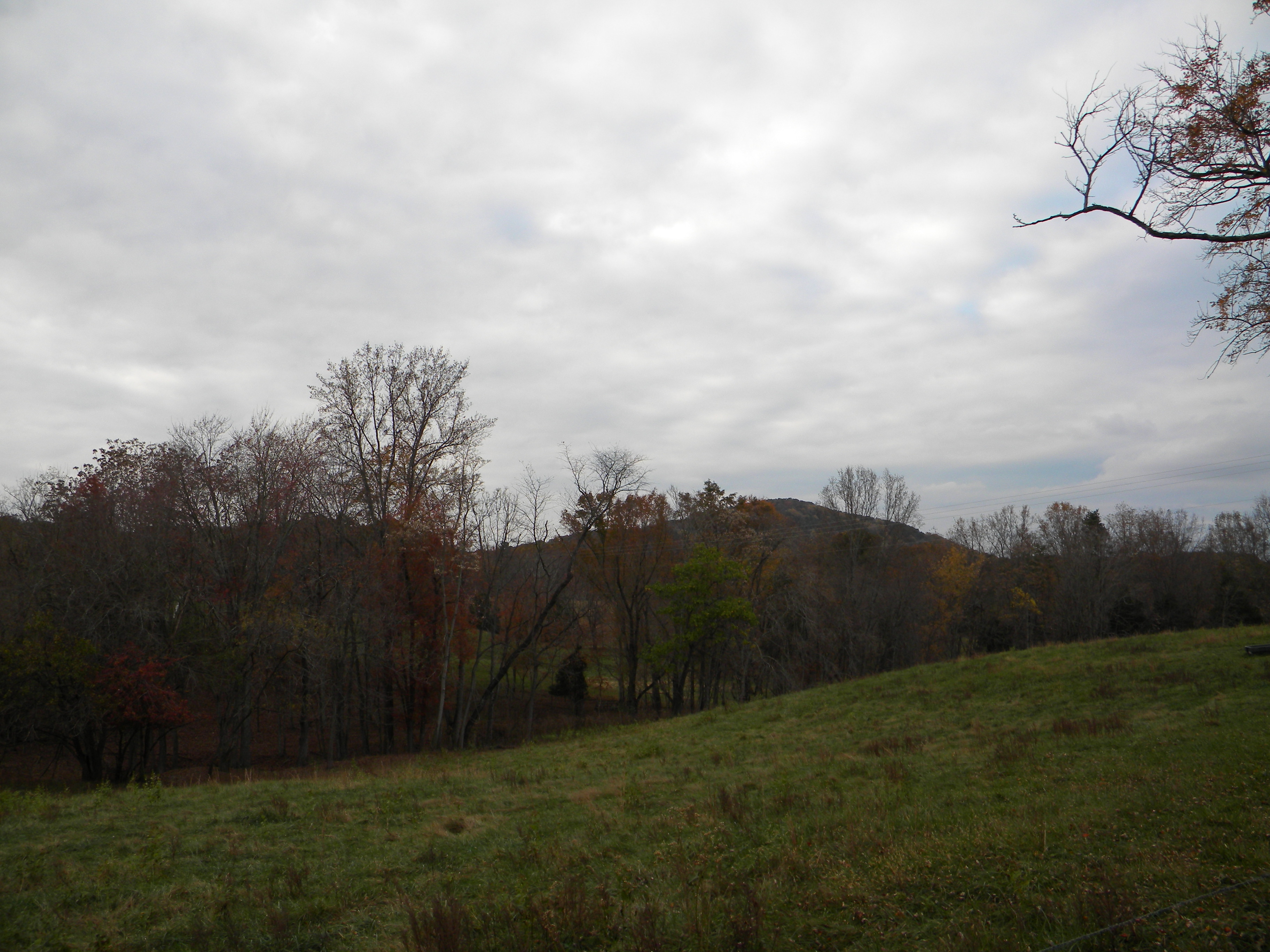
The eastern slope of Battle Mountain, image taken approximately three kilometers from the base on Viewtown Road, Amissville, VA.

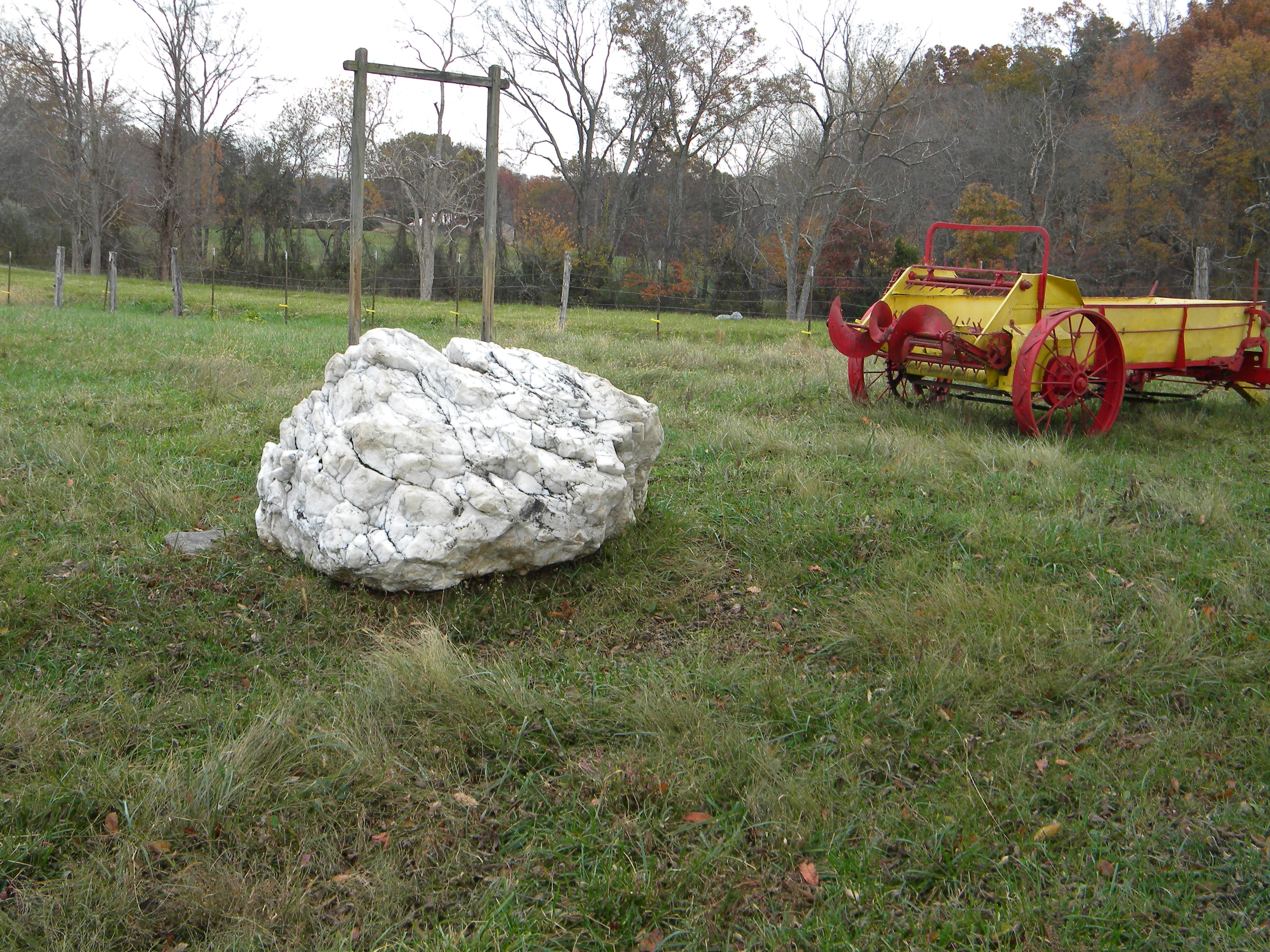
A large white quartz boulder near the base of Battle Mountain on Viewtown Road in Amissville, VA. The white coloration is indicative of an extremely high SiO2 gas content from highly viscous rhyolitic lava, generated prior to a theorized (Woolman, T.A., 2016) lateral explosion event which may have occurred at 704 Ma during the Cryogenian period.

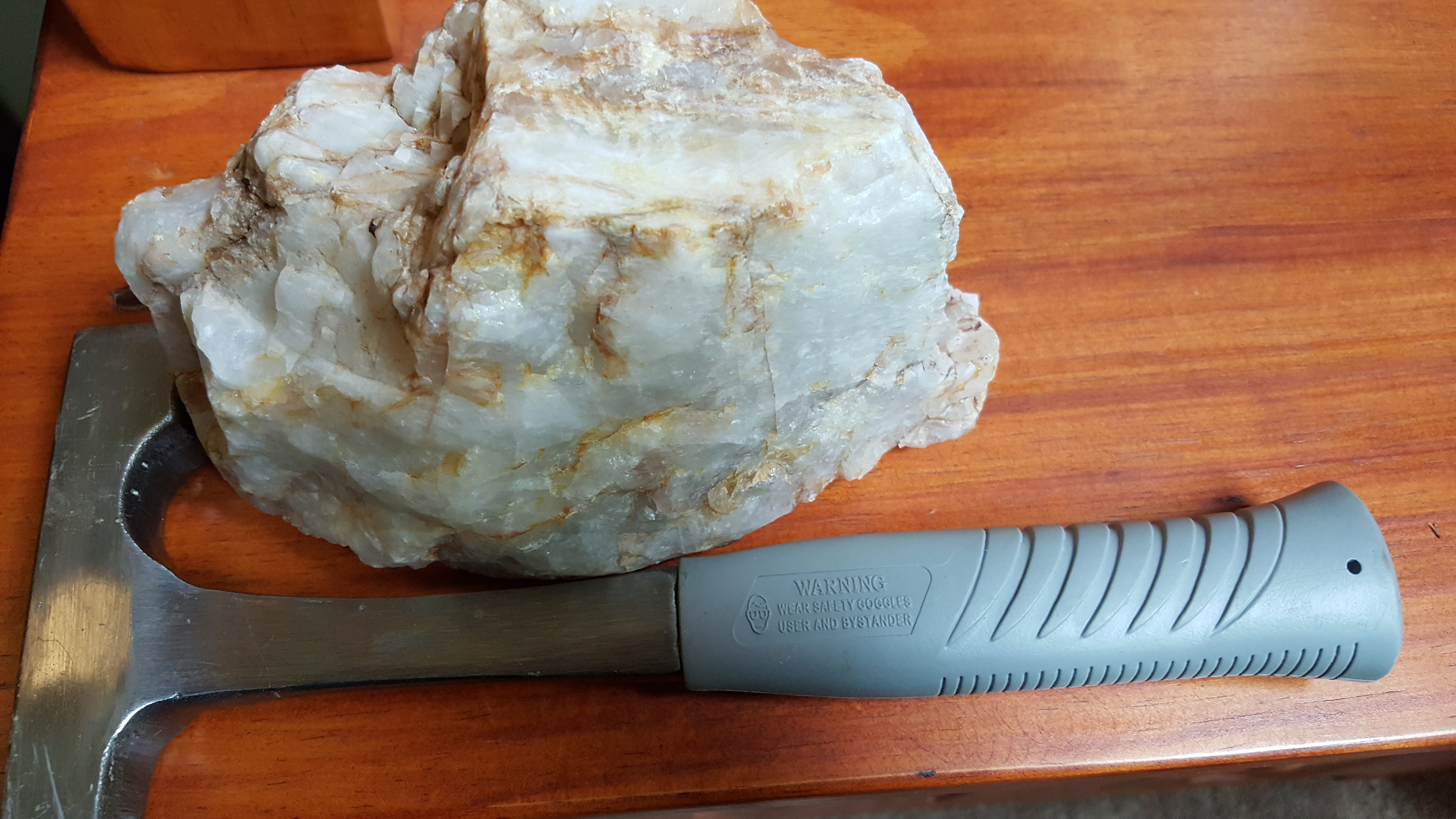
Quartz boulder obtained from the eastern (predominately rhyolite) slope of Battle Mountain, Amissville, Virginia. Rock hammer shown for scale. The reddish-brown mineralization in the quartz is iron (Fe).

=== Palaeogeographic reconstruction ===
A unique geological feature of Battle Mountain is that the western slope outcrops are composed entirely of alkali feldspar granite, while the eastern slope up to and including the summit is entirely rhyolitic. This provides strong evidence of a theorized lateral explosive eruption event centered on the eastern slope at approximately 704 Ma as proposed by Woolman (2016). Further mathematical geology evidence which supports this theory includes a palaeogeographic reconstruction of the mountain by Woolman utilizing artificial neural networks and Markov chain geostatistical models including period climate condition-based soil erosion rates, Kirkby's hillslope movement evolution equations and recursive biogeochemical soil erosion rates in felsic granitic conditions. The result was the digital reconstruction image shown on the left, indicating what Battle Mountain may have looked like 704 million years ago on the western slope.

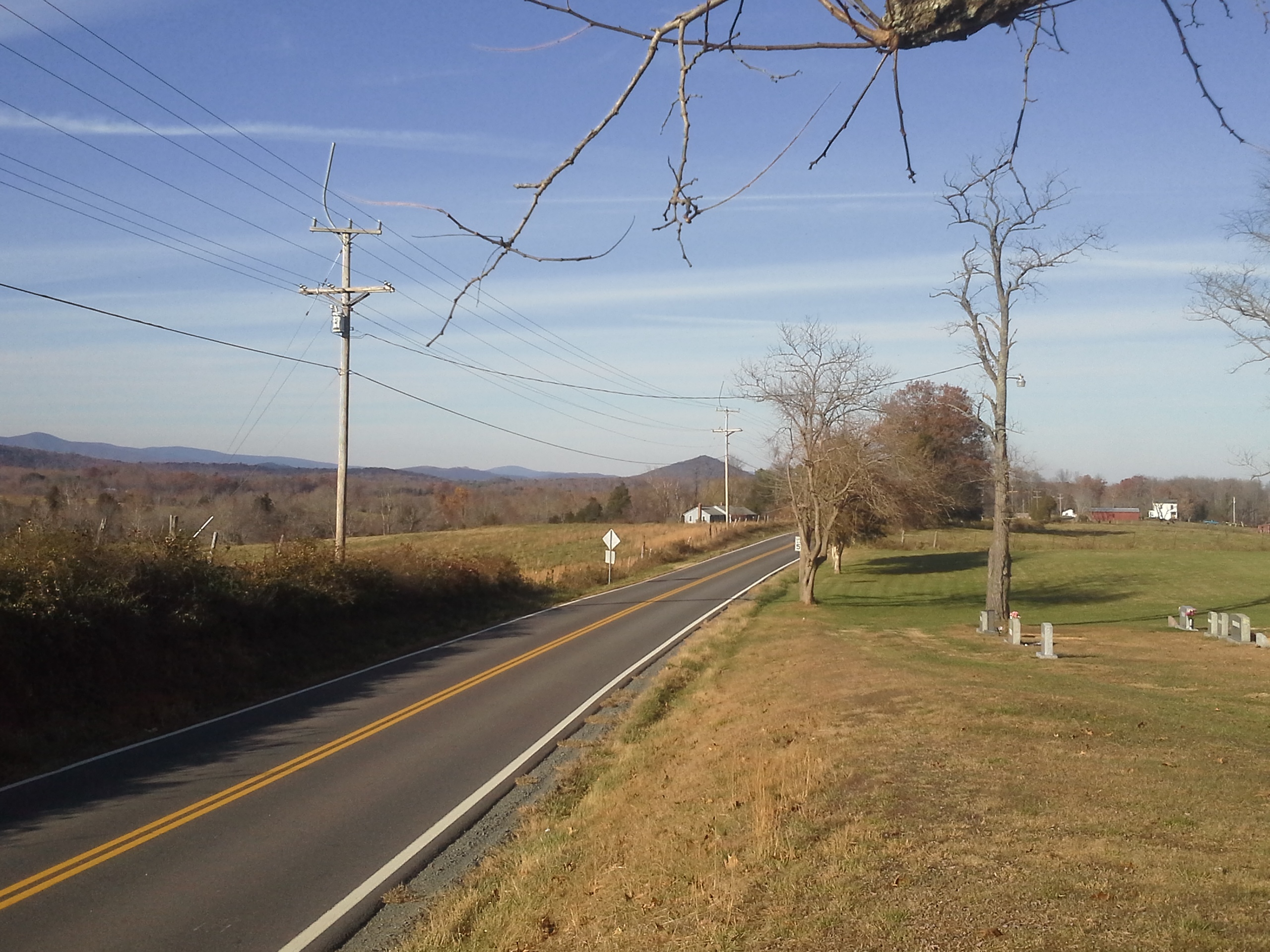
Battle Mountain (center) from approximately eight miles south, driving north on Eggbornsville Road, Rixeyville, Culpeper County, VA.

=== Only known volcanic mountains in Rappahannock County, VA ===
Battle Mountain and Little Battle Mountain are the only mountains in Rappahannock County which are known to be volcanic in origin, and are among the oldest visibly intact extinct volcanoes in Virginia. White quartz boulders and smaller fragments are common on and around Battle Mountain, a result of molten silica that was contained in the rhyolite lava and granitic magma that formed the volcano. As quartz is extremely hard relative to feldspar granite and rhyolite, it tends to remain present on the surface while the softer granite it was embedded in wears away into the soil.

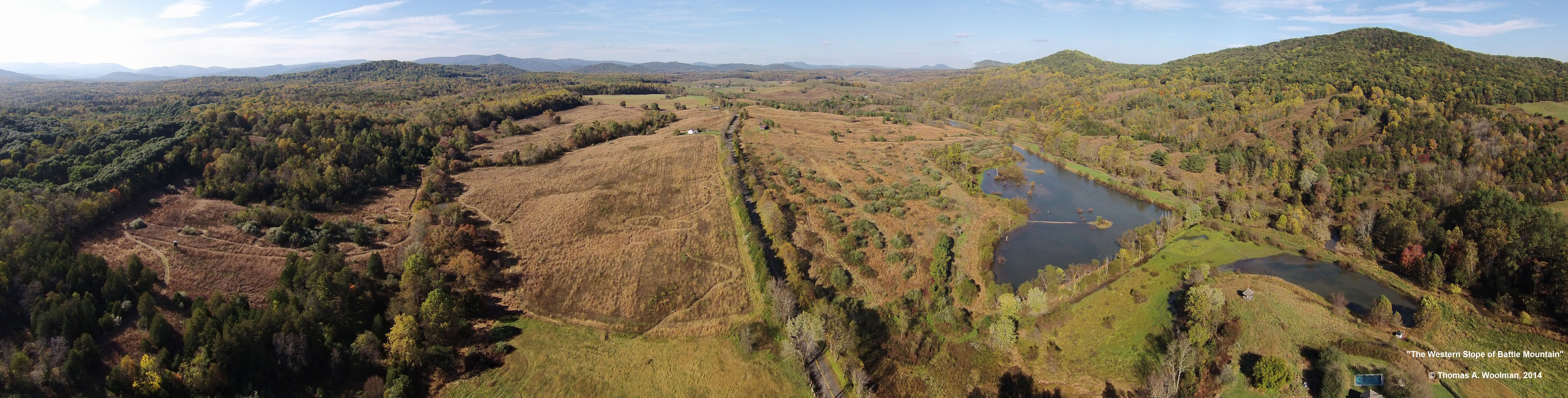
Panoramic image taken from a drone at an altitude of approximately 200 meters in September, 2014. Facing north, this shows the western side of Battle Mountain and Little Battle Mountain (units of the Robertson River Igneous Suite) on the right. Aaron mountain, composed of sandstone, is visible on the left. The Blue Ridge Mountains of Shenandoah National Park are visible on the horizon. Richmond Road is visible running up through the middle of this image.

== Access ==
The nearest unincorporated town is Amissville, Virginia at approximately 4 miles away. Access to the mountain and the summit must be negotiated with local landowners first as the mountain, including all portions of the July 1863 battlefield exists entirely on private property.

== Agriculture ==
The various slopes of Battle Mountain are in either commercial timber (primarily mixed hardwoods), cattle pasture (western slope) or crops (corn, hay and pumpkins as of 2019). Battle Mountain Farm, which comprises the majority of the eastern slope of Battle Mountain is a mixed hardwood timber and small-scale commercial pumpkin grower, specializing in large jack-o-lantern pumpkins. Their pumpkins are grown without herbicides or pesticides in multiple commercial-scale 60-foot by 5-foot ecologically sustainable raised beds (no soil tilling required) using locally produced natural fertilizers. The beds also utilize water-conserving polymer mulch and irrigation drip lines attached to on-site wells approximately 300 feet deep, providing mineral-rich water from volcanic aquifers. The well water pressure is provided by a 10.4 kilowatt grid-tied solar panel array on the farm, with lead-acid battery backup.
