= True to the Army =

1942 film by Albert S. Rogell

- Theatrical release poster
- Directed by: Albert S. Rogell
- Screenplay by: Art Arthur; Bradford Ropes; Edmund L. Hartmann; Val Burton
- Produced by: Sol C. Siegel
- Starring: Judy Canova; Allan Jones; Ann Miller; Jerry Colonna; Clarence Kolb; Edward Pawley; William Wright
- Cinematography: Daniel L. Fapp
- Edited by: Alma Macrorie
- Music by: Robert Emmett Dolan; Leigh Harline
- Production company: Paramount Pictures
- Distributed by: Paramount Pictures
- Release date: March 21, 1942
- Running time: 77 minutes
- Country: United States
- Language: English

True to the Army is a 1942 American comedy film directed by Albert S. Rogell, written by Art Arthur, Bradford Ropes, Edmund L. Hartmann and Val Burton, and starring Judy Canova, Allan Jones, Ann Miller, Jerry Colonna, Clarence Kolb, Edward Pawley and William Wright. It was released on March 21, 1942, by Paramount Pictures.

The film was based on a 1933 play by Howard Lindsay that was based on the 1933 novel She Loves Me Not by Edward Hope. Paramount had previously filmed the property as She Loves Me Not (1934) starring Bing Crosby and Miriam Hopkins. 20th Century Fox remade the property in 1955 as How to Be Very, Very Popular.

== Cast ==
- Judy Canova as Daisy Hawkins
- Allan Jones as Pvt. Stephen Chandler
- Ann Miller as Vicki Marlow
- Jerry Colonna as Pvt. 'Pinky' Fothergill
- Clarence Kolb as Gen. Marlowe
- Edward Pawley as Junior
- William Wright as Lt. Danvers
- William Demarest as Sgt. Butts
- Edwin Max as Ice
- Arthur Loft as Ray
- Gordon Jones as Pvt. Dugan
- Rod Cameron as Pvt. O'Toole
- Eddie Acuff as Sgt. Riggs
- Edgar Dearing as Target Sergeant
- Mary Treen as Mae
- Selmer Jackson as Congressman
- Dorothy Sebastian as Gloria

== See also ==
- She Loves Me Not (1934)
- How to Be Very, Very Popular (1955)
