= Amissville, Virginia =

Amissville
- Unincorporated community
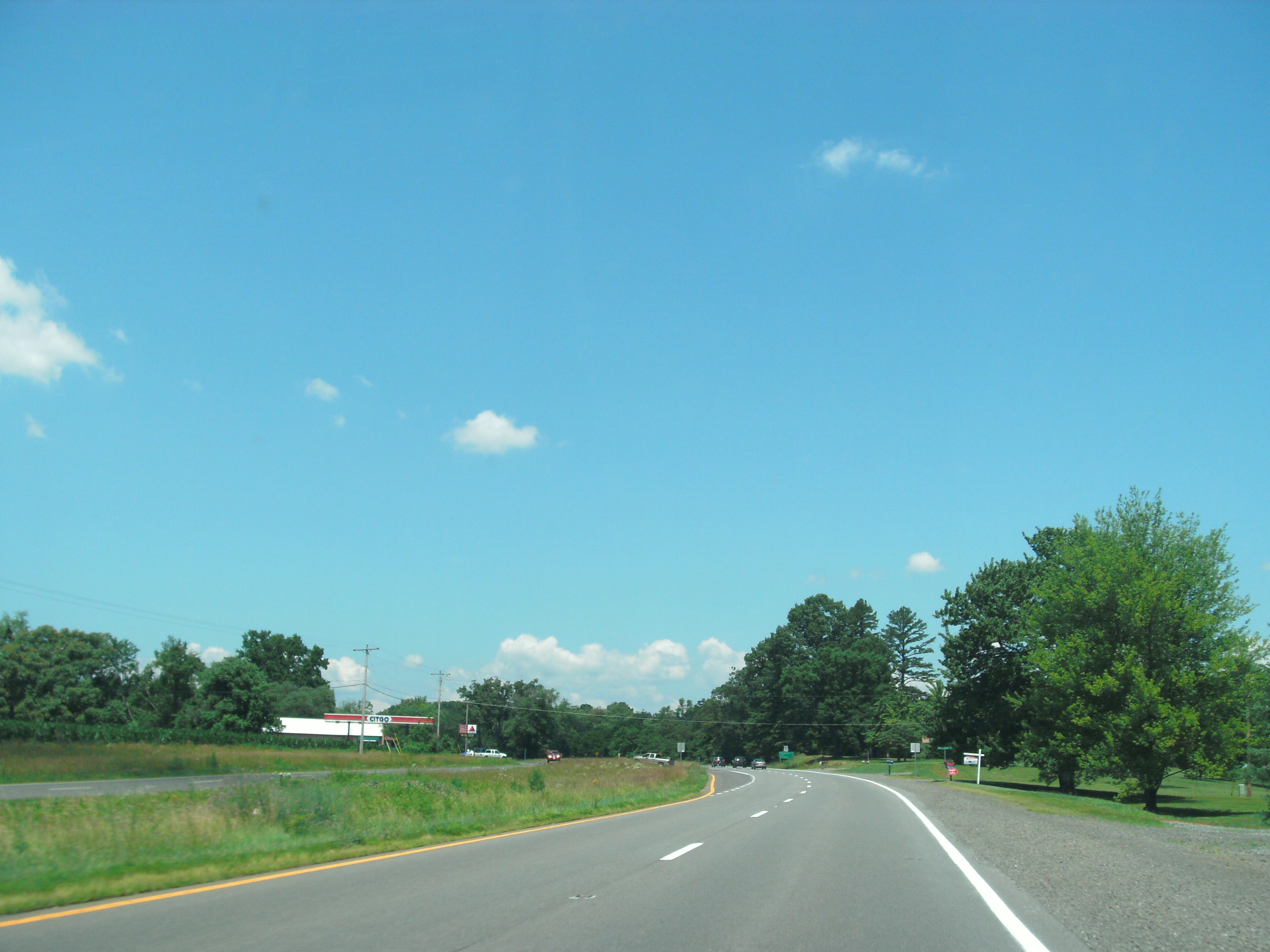
- View of Amissville, along Route 211 (facing west)

- Location within the state of Virginia Amissville (the United States)
- Coordinates: 38°40′17″N 77°59′44″W
- Country: United States
- State: Virginia
- County: Rappahannock
- Elevation: 410 ft (120 m)
- Time zone: UTC−5 (Eastern (EST))
  - Summer (DST): UTC−4 (EDT)
- ZIP code: 20106
- Area code: 540

Amissville ( /ˈeɪmɪsvɪl/ AY-mis-vil) is an unincorporated community in Rappahannock County in the U.S. commonwealth of Virginia. It is located on U.S. Route 211 about halfway between Warrenton and the small town of Washington.

The Locust Grove/R.E. Luttrell Farmstead and Meadow Grove Farm are listed on the National Register of Historic Places.

== History ==
The land on which the village of Amissville is now situated was part of the 5.3 million acre Northern Neck Proprietary owned in the 1700s by Thomas Fairfax, 6th Lord Fairfax of Cameron. In 1649 King Charles II of England, then in exile in France after the execution of his father, Charles I, had given this unmapped and unsettled region to seven loyal supporters. By 1688 the proprietary was owned solely by Thomas Lord Culpeper whose only child married Thomas 5th Lord Fairfax in 1690. They acquired the proprietary on the death of Lord Culpeper and the region became synonymous with the Fairfax name. In 1719, Thomas 6th Lord Fairfax inherited the land. (Note: Land grants issued by the agents of King Charles II and by agents of the Northern Neck (Fairfax) Proprietary are housed in the archives of the Library of Virginia in Richmond and are available online at the Library's website (www.lva.virginia.gov)) During 1747 to 1766, Lord Fairfax granted land that encompassed the area of today's Amissville to five individuals: Thomas Burk received 200 acres, Samuel Scott received 270 acres and 470 acres, James Genn received two grants of 400 acres each, Gabriel Jones received 380 acres, and Philip Edward Jones received 452 acres. It is widely believed that individuals with surnames Amiss and Bayse received land grants from Lord Fairfax in the Amissville area. However, there are no grants to anyone with these surnames recorded in the Virginia Colonial land grant books maintained by the Library of Virginia. Rather, Joseph Amiss and Edmond Bayse purchased existing land grants. On 14 July 1766 Joseph Amiss purchased, for 40 pounds, the 380 acres that had been granted to Gabriel Jones. On 15 October 1770 Edmond Bayse purchased, for 90 pounds, the 800 acres that had been granted to James Genn. On 1 July 1794, Joseph Amiss distributed his land and slaves as gifts to his three living sons William, Philip, and Thomas, and his grandsons William (son of William) and John (son of Thomas). In return, Joseph and his wife Constant were given a life estate to the property (10) Constant is believed to have been a daughter of Gabriel Jones. The sons and grandsons and their children purchased additional land in the Amissville area. On 20 April 1778, Edmond Bayse gave his son Elijamon 190 acres of the 800 acres that Edmond had acquired in 1770. This was the northern part of the 800 acres, located adjacent to today's Route 211. Although Elijamon sold this land in 1789, he and his children acquired other land in the Amissville area and became major landowners. In 1810, the region had developed to the point where a US Post Office was established, requiring the town to be named. The Amiss and Bayse families both still maintained a significant presence and each wanted the new town to be named after their family. It was put to a vote and by the margin of a single ballot, Amissville beat out Bayseville. The post office was established on 2 October 1810, with Thomas Amiss as its first postmaster. In 1833, Amissville became part of Rappahannock County. At that time, the village consisted of a store, a schoolhouse and probably a blacksmith shop and a Methodist church. In 1854, Amissville was described as a small post-village with about 75 inhabitants.

=== US Civil War ===
Amissville is near the site of a minor action on July 24, 1863, involving George A. Custer's Michigan Brigade of cavalry following the Confederate loss at Gettysburg. Longstreet's corps and Gen. A. P. Hill's corps were retreating from Pennsylvania through the Chester Gap and south on the Richmond Road towards Culpeper. Custer and his troops traveled from their headquarters and camp near Amissville and attacked with cavalry and artillery from the southern slope of Battle Mountain (about 5 miles southwest of the village), but his forces were vastly outnumbered and after a brisk and severe fight, forced to retreat north and east over Battle Mountain back to Amissville. Two of Custer's men were awarded the Medal of Honor in 1893 for their part in capturing Confederate artillery at Battle Mountain. Battle Mountain and Little Battle Mountain were named not for the military engagement but for the Bataille family which lived near the two elevations in the 1700s. Bataille was later corrupted to Battle Mountain and Little Battle Mountain, the names they bear today.

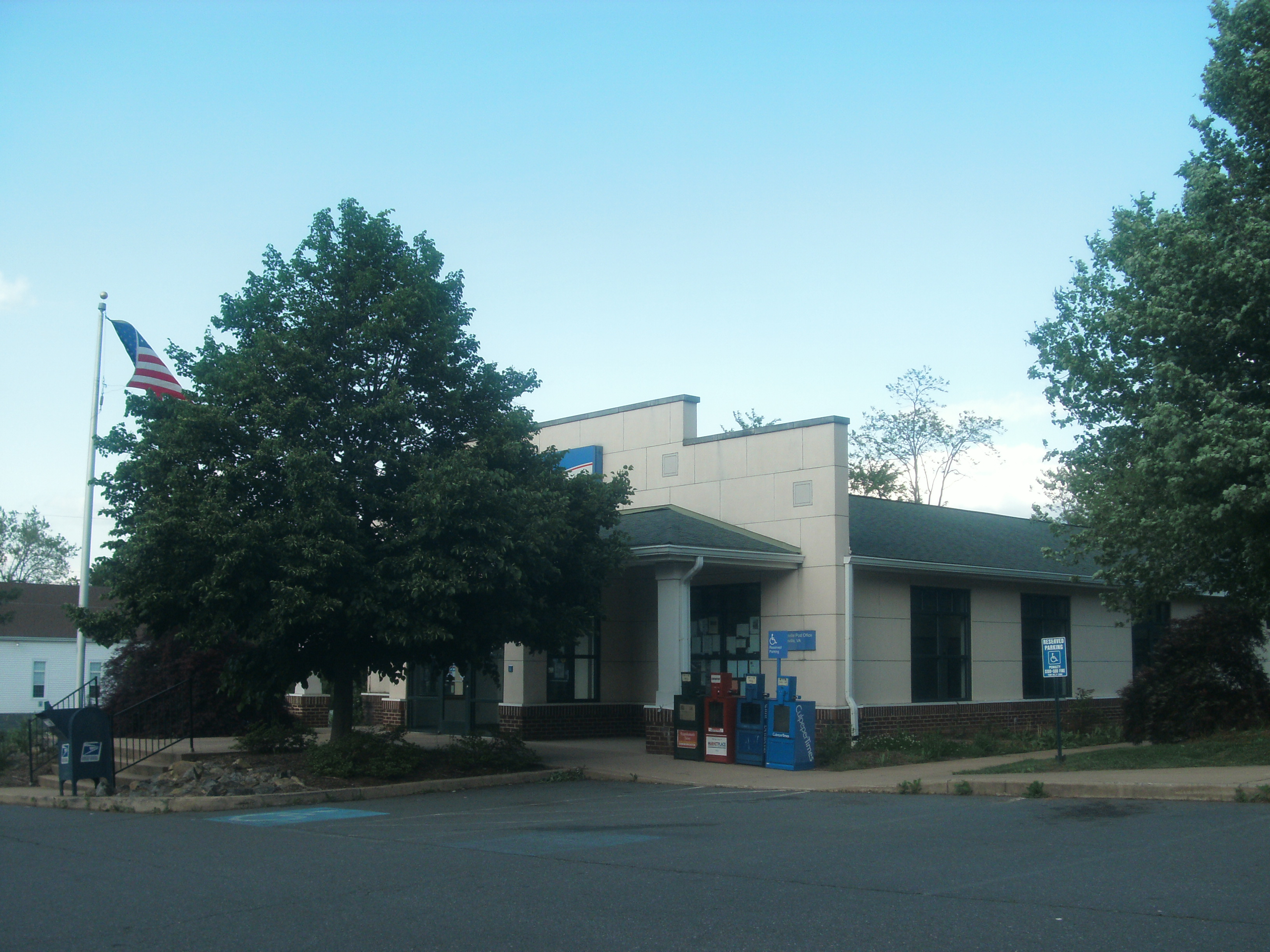
Post office in Amissville

Amissville was also the site of a sharp cavalry fight in November 1862, at Corbin's Crossroads, when Gen. J.E.B. Stuart's Confederate cavalry were heading to Culpeper County following the Battle of Antietam in Maryland. At Corbin's crossroads, during the fight, Gen. Stuart narrowly escaped death when he turned his head and a Union bullet clipped off half of his moustache. The site of the engagement is about 3/4 of a mile south of the present village of Amissville.

In late August 1862, Gen. Stuart and his cavalry were scouting around Maj. Gen. John Pope's Federal Army of Virginia, elements of which were moving towards Thoroughfare Gap in Fauquier County. Gen. Stuart and his cavalry reached Amissville on August 22, and turned back to surround Pope's army. In an attack near Catlett's Station, Gen. Stuart's men captured Gen. Pope's overcoat and military papers.

== Climate ==
The climate in this area is characterized by hot, humid summers and generally mild to cool winters. According to the Köppen Climate Classification system, Amissville has a humid subtropical climate, abbreviated "Cfa" on climate maps.

== Geology ==
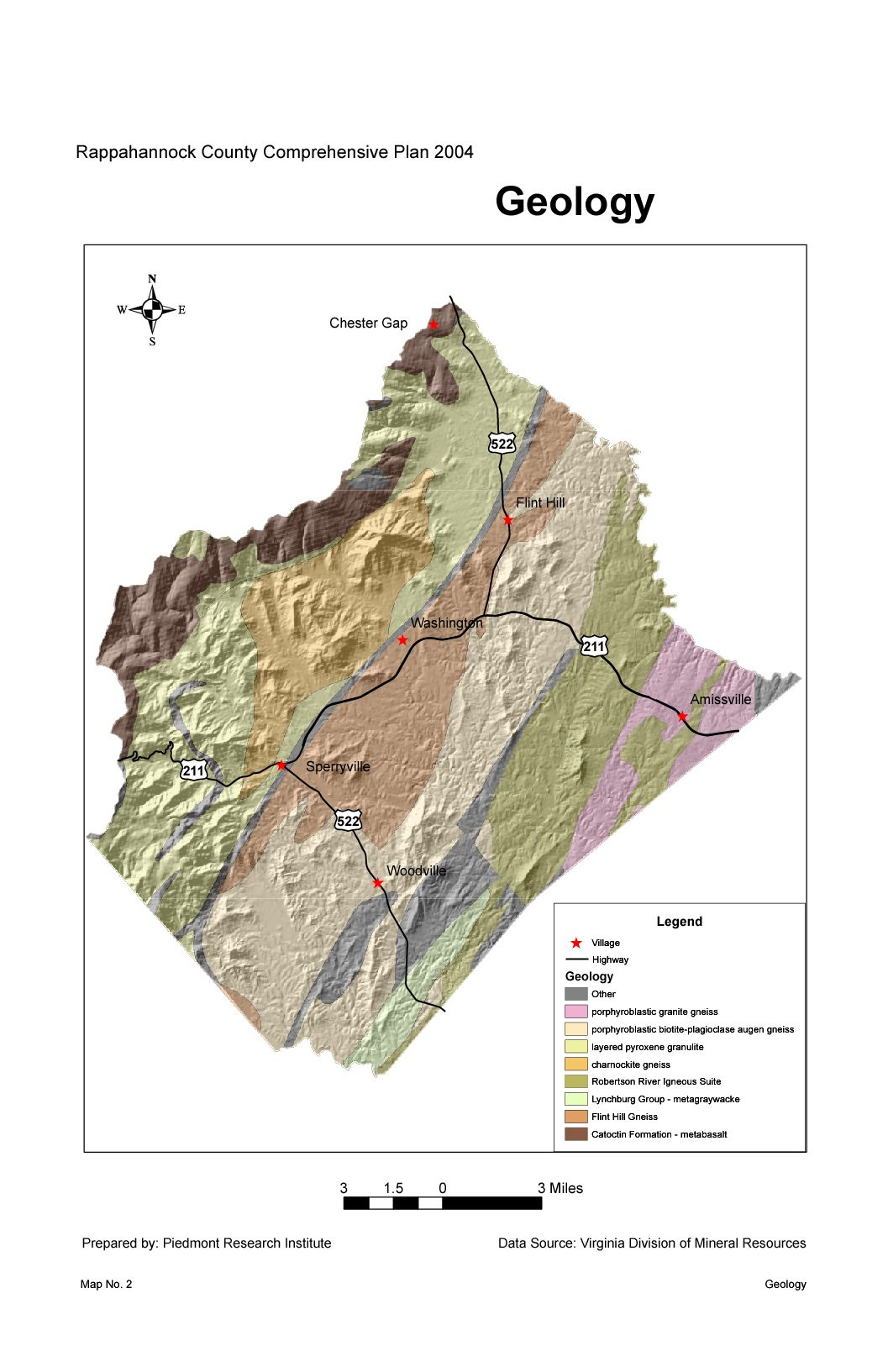
Geological map of Rappahannock County, with the village of Amissville shown on the far right

The geology of Amissville and the surrounding vicinity consists of several units. Predominant and oldest (approximately 704 million years old, +/- 5 million years, based on the U-Pb zircon geochronology dating method, coinciding with the initial rifting of the supercontinent Rodinia) is the Neoproterozoic alkali feldspar granitic rock of the Robertson River Igneous Suite. This includes felsic complex material such as biotite, hornblende-biotite, magnetite, and alkali granitic rock including rhyolite on the eastern slopes of Battle Mountain and Little Battle Mountain.

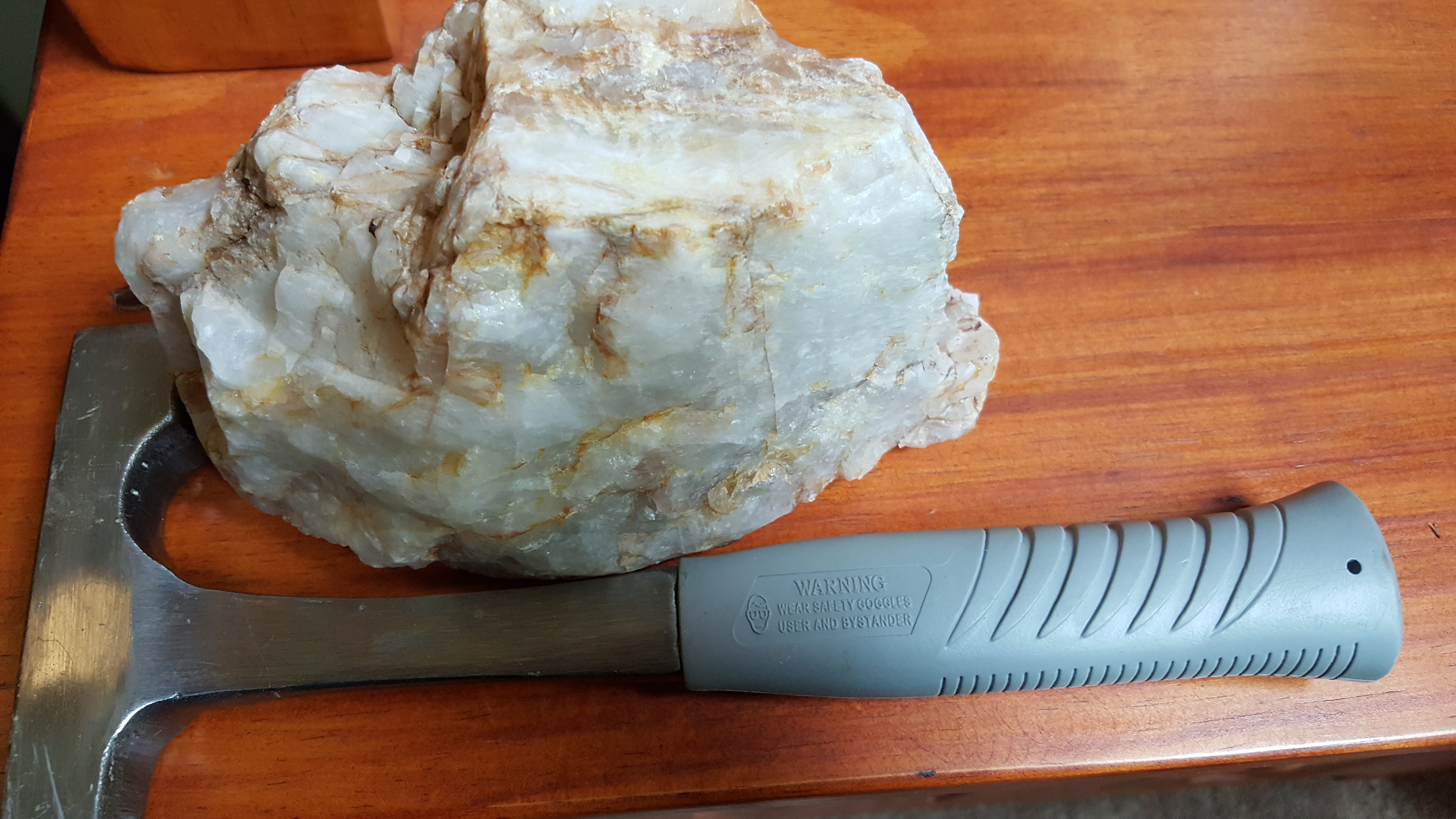
Quartz boulder obtained from the eastern (rhyolite) slope of Battle Mountain, Amissville, Virginia. Rock hammer shown for scale. The reddish-brown mineralization in the quartz is iron (Fe).

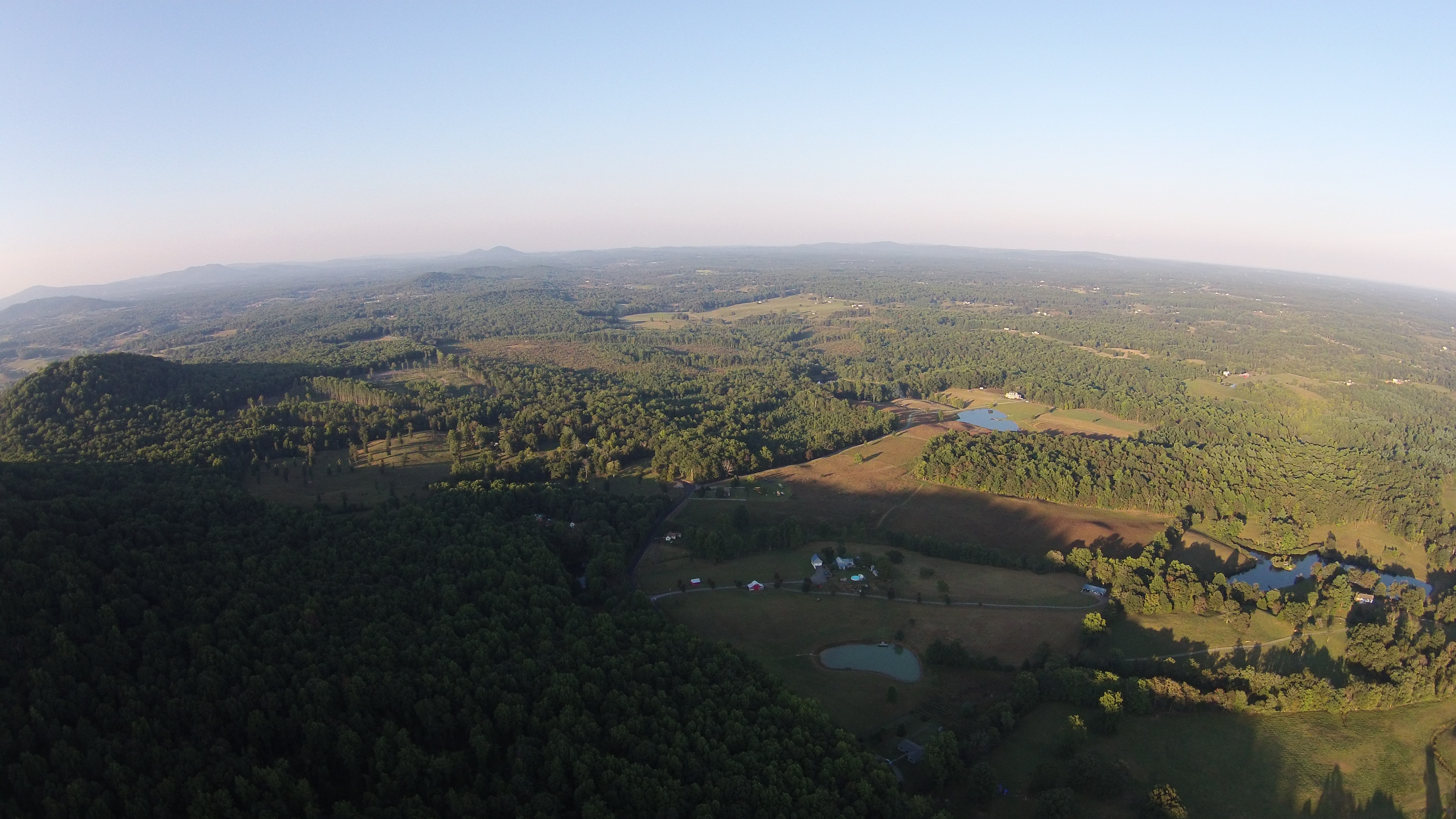
Drone aerial image from approximately 1,500 feet of altitude showing a portion of the eastern side of Battle Mountain, with Little Battle Mountain shown in the background on left. Camera is facing northeast in the direction of the Amissville post office (approximately 4 miles away, not shown). The sun is setting over the mountain to the west. Summer, 2015.

Battle Mountain and Little Battle Mountain are the only mountains in Rappahannock County which are known to be volcanic in origin, and are among the oldest visibly intact extinct volcanoes in Virginia. White quartz boulders and smaller fragments are common on and around Battle Mountain, a result of molten silica that was contained in the rhyolite lava and granitic magma that formed the volcano.

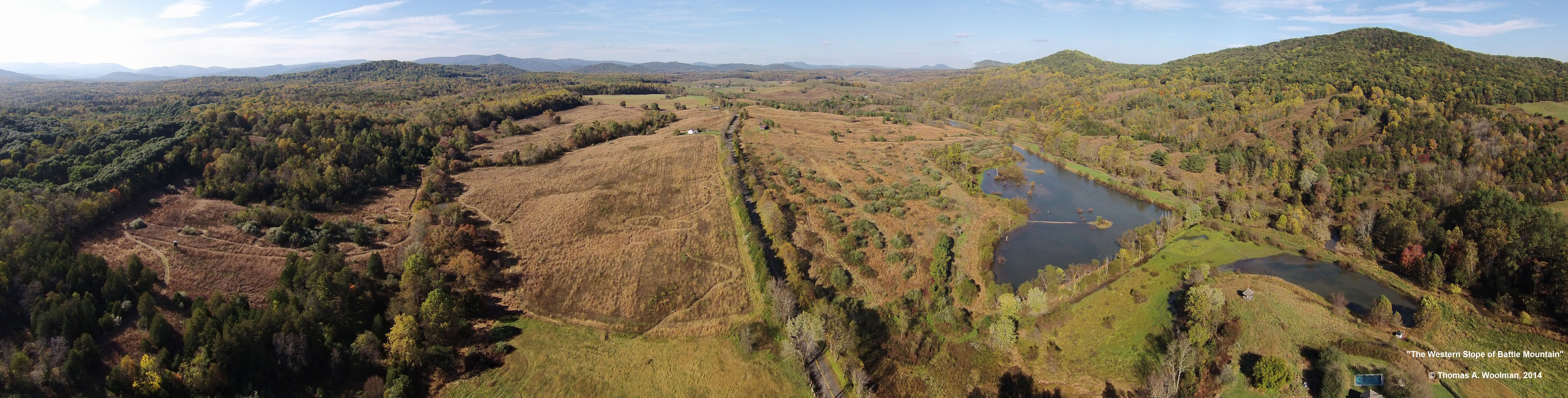
Panoramic image taken from a drone at an altitude of approximately 200 meters in September, 2014. Facing north, this shows the western side of Battle Mountain and Little Battle Mountain (units of the Robertson River Igneous Suite) on the right. Aaron mountain, composed of sandstone, is visible on the left. The Blue Ridge Mountains of Shenandoah National Park are visible on the horizon. Richmond Road is visible running up through the middle of this image.

The Robertson River Igneous Suite extends from south of Laurel Mills (originating near Charlottesville) and runs north-northeast through Hackleys Crossroad and beyond in a band approximately four kilometers wide. Precambrian coarse leucogneiss and fine-grained gneiss prevails from the eastern edge of the Amissville, Rappahannock County area from north of the Amissville post office and U.S. Route 211 and south to Viewtown. Flint Hill Gneiss, a light to dark-gray quartz monzonite gneiss is predominate from Ben Venue and west to Massies Corner and extending further into Rock Mills and the town of Washington, Virginia.

A fine-grained Precambrian arkosic sandstone and conglomerate, which Aaron Mountain is composed of, occurs on the contact between the Flint Hill Gneiss starting approximately two kilometers west of Laurel Mills and running north-northeast along a narrow band (starting out at approximately 1 kilometer wide and tapering down to 100 meters) in contact with the Robertson River Igneous Suite, terminating just south of U.S. Route 211. The creeksides and river bottoms of the Thorton River, Battle Run and the Rappahannock River and their smaller tributaries are all composed of Quaternary Period alluvium including stratified, unconsolidated gray to grayish-yellow sand, silt and local gravels.
