= Locust Grove/R.E. Luttrell Farmstead =

- Locust Grove-R.E. Luttrell Farmstead
- U.S. National Register of Historic Places
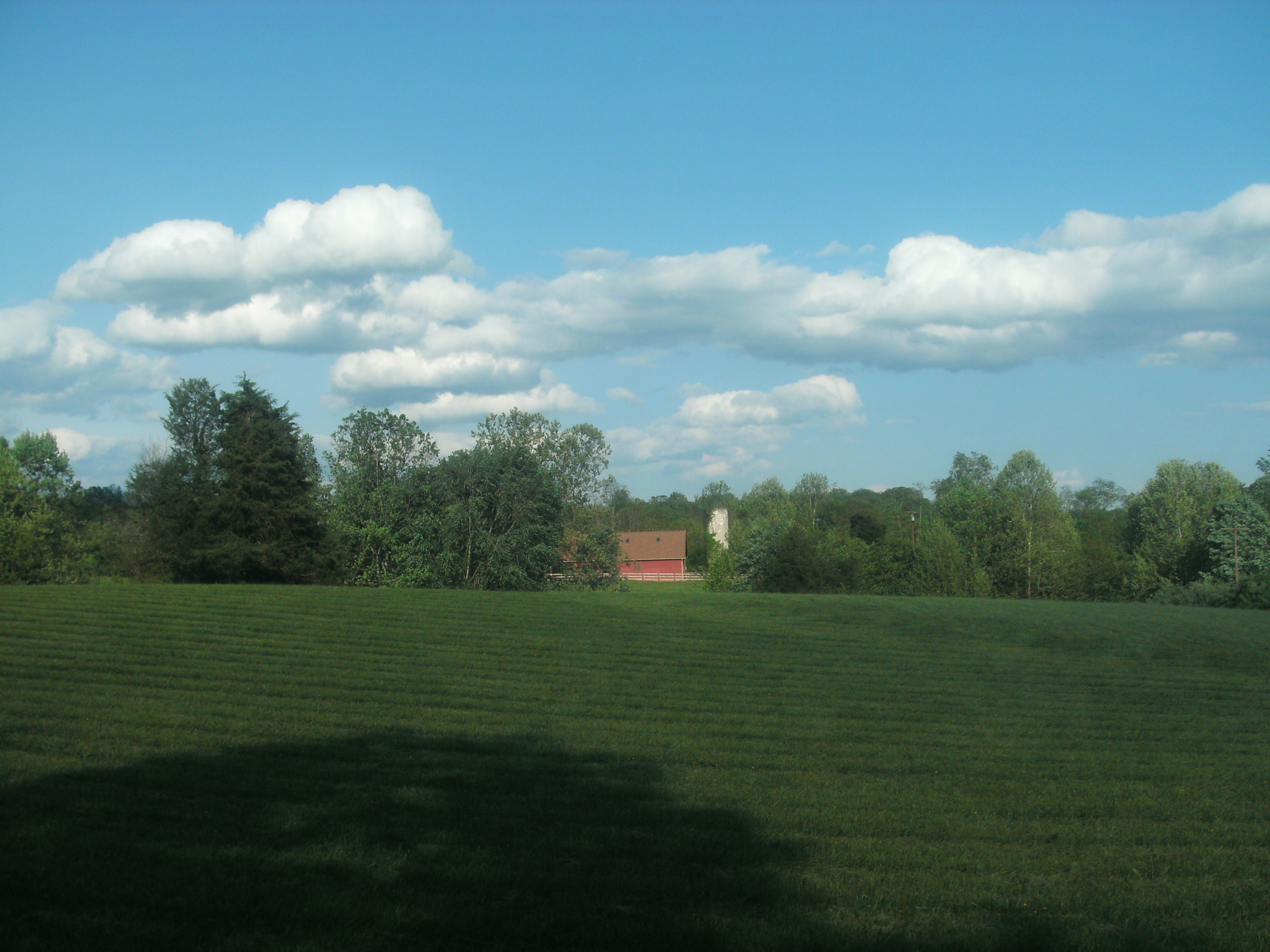
- Fields surrounding the property, May, 2016

- Location within Virginia Location within the United States
- Location: 24 Bunree Lane, Amissville, Virginia
- Coordinates: 38.690488°N 77.991826°W
- Area: 19 acres (7.7 ha)
- Built: c. 1815
- NRHP reference No.: 13000343
- Added to NRHP: May 28, 2013

The Locust Grove/R.E. Luttrell Farmstead is a historic farmstead at 24 Bunree Lane in Amissville, Virginia. The main house of the 19-acre (7.7 ha) farm is an I-house plan timber frame structure built c. 1815. It was extended in the 19th century with a two-story addition to the side, and again in 1960 with a modern two story addition to the rear. The core of the house has retained much of its interior decoration and woodwork. The farmstead includes a number of outbuildings, including a tenant house dating to the turn of the 20th century, and c. 1920 stallion barn, chicken house, and meat house. A c. 1830s barn collapsed due to a heavy snow load in 2011. The original owner of the farmstead is not known; its longest tenure of ownership was by the interrelated Corbin, Bywaters, Nelson, Luttrell, and Amiss families.

The property was added to the National Register of Historic Places in 2013.
