= She Loves Me Not (1934 film) =

1934 film by Benjamin Glazer, Elliott Nugent

- Theatrical release poster
- Directed by: Elliott Nugent
- Screenplay by: Benjamin Glazer
- Based on: She Loves Me Not by: Edward Hope (novel); Howard Lindsay (play)
- Produced by: Benjamin Glazer
- Starring: Bing Crosby; Miriam Hopkins
- Cinematography: Charles Lang
- Edited by: Hugh Bennett
- Music by: Tom Satterfield
- Production company: Paramount Pictures
- Distributed by: Paramount Pictures
- Release date: August 31, 1934 (USA)
- Running time: 85 minutes
- Country: United States
- Language: English

She Loves Me Not is a 1934 American comedy film directed by Elliott Nugent and starring Bing Crosby and Miriam Hopkins. Based on the novel She Loves Me Not by Edward Hope and the subsequent play by Howard Lindsay, the film is about a cabaret dancer who witnesses a murder and is forced to hide from gangsters by disguising herself as a male Princeton student. Distributed by Paramount Pictures, the film has been remade twice as True to the Army (1942) and as How to Be Very, Very Popular in (1955), the latter starring Betty Grable.

The film is notable as one of Crosby's earliest starring vehicles. It was also the last film that Miriam Hopkins made under her contract to Paramount Pictures.

In 1935, the film received an Academy Award nomination for Best Original Song for "Love in Bloom", the theme song of comedian Jack Benny.

== Cast ==
- Bing Crosby as Paul Lawton
- Miriam Hopkins as Curly Flagg
- Kitty Carlisle as Midge Mercer
- Edward J. Nugent as Buzz Jones
- Henry Stephenson as Dean Mercer
- Maude Turner Gordon as Mrs. Arbuthnot
- Warren Hymer as Mugg Schnitzel
- Lynne Overman as Gus McNeal
- Judith Allen as Frances Arbuthnot
- George Barbier as J. Thorval Jones
- Henry Kolker as Charles M. Lawton
- Vince Barnett as Baldy O'Hara
- Margaret Armstrong as Martha
- Ralf Harolde as J. B.
- Matt McHugh as Andy
- Franklyn Cordell as Arkle

== Production ==
Ida Lupino and Charles Ruggles were reported to have joined the cast in early 1934, but neither appeared in the film.

Before filming commenced, Paramount announced plans to retitle the film College Rhythm but preserved the original title because of the notoriety of the novel and stage production. An unrelated film titled College Rhythm was also released by Paramount in 1934.

== Reception ==
The film was one of Paramount's biggest hits of the year.

In a contemporary review for The New York Times, critic Mordaunt Hall wrote: "As on the stage, this adaptation is a swift-paced piece of hilarity, with occasional romantic interludes during which Bing Crosby and Kitty Carlisle contribute some tuneful melodies. Some of the farcical episodes in this Paramount offering are apt to recall that famous old comedy, 'Charley's Aunt,' but in the present production, instead of having a varsity student in skirts, they dress up a cabaret girl in male attire after she has invaded a dormitory room."

A review in The Buffalo News found the film to be "a gaily diverting bit of humorous fantasy" and "clean and unceasingly funny."

== Songs ==
- "Love in Bloom" (Leo Robin and Ralph Rainger) – sung by Bing Crosby and Kitty Carlisle
- "After All You're All I'm After" (Edward Heyman and Arthur Schwartz) (written for the film but not used)
- "Straight from the Shoulder" (Mack Gordon and Harry Revel) – sung by Bing Crosby and Kitty Carlisle
- "I'm Hummin', I'm Whistlin', I'm Singin'" (Mack Gordon and Harry Revel) – sung by Bing Crosby
- "Put a Little Rhythm in Everything You Do" (Mack Gordon and Harry Revel) – sung by Miriam Hopkins

Crosby recorded some of the songs for Brunswick Records. "Love in Bloom" topped the music chart for six weeks.
