= Helen Shipman =

American actress (1899–1984)

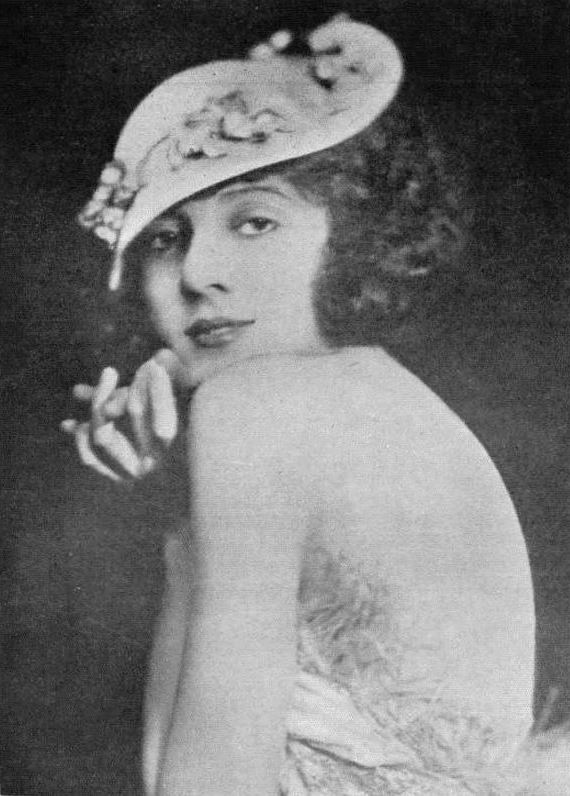
- Shipman in 1921
- Born: Helen Phyllis Shipman; February 5, 1899, Pittsburgh, Pennsylvania, U.S.
- Died: April 13, 1984, Rappahannock County, Virginia, U.S. (aged 85)
- Occupation: Actress

Helen Phyllis Shipman (February 5, 1899 – April 13, 1984) was an American singer, dancer and actress who starred in various Broadway musicals, in musical comedies in vaudeville, and in films.

== Early life and career ==
Shipman was the daughter of William H. Shipman, a printer. She had a sister who was married to a "wealthy New York oil man."

Shipman began performing at the age of three doing impressions of famous adult stars in the entertainment business. Her first professional job was as "Baby Phyllis" at the Duquesne Theater in Pittsburgh, Pennsylvania. In 1908, she toured on the B. F. Keith show circuit in a play titled Little Nemo. After that tour, she moved with her mother and older sister to New York City to advance her career, however, she continued to tour on the Keith circuit.

Between tours, she worked in variety shows at the Palace Theatre in New York City, where she sang songs composed for her by lyricist, Neville Fleeson. It was in these shows that she got to know other entertainers such as Jimmy Durante and the Marx Brothers. She was childhood friends with Ira and George Gershwin.

In 1915, Shipman was invited by Florenz Ziegfeld to co-star in his new Midnight Frolic production on the rooftop of the New Amsterdam Theatre in New York City. She had her first starring role on Broadway in the musical Oh, Boy! in 1917, and followed that with another Broadway musical comedy, Oh Lady! Lady!

She then took the 1919 Broadway musical, Irene, on tour playing the title role and introducing the song "Alice Blue Gown" to audiences in places like Cleveland and Chicago. Her longest running Broadway play was The Lady In Ermine which ran for 232 performances at the Ambassador Theatre in 1922. She starred in many other Broadway plays.

She also performed in at least 14 movies including Christopher Bean (1933) with Beulah Bondi and Marie Dressler, Naughty Marietta (1935) with Nelson Eddy and Frank Morgan, San Francisco (1936) with Clark Gable and Jeanette MacDonald, and Small Town Girl (1936) with Robert Taylor and James Stewart. She expressed (to her sister) hopes of playing the role of Hannah in the upcoming movie titled "White Banners" (1938) but lost the part to actress Fay Bainter.

== Later life ==
Shipman married the Broadway, movie, and radio actor Edward Pawley while he was in Hollywood performing in movies. Pawley had been a star on Broadway and was the first actor to portray Sinclair Lewis' Elmer Gantry character on the Broadway stage in 1928. Shipman effectively quit show business after their marriage and focused more attention on her other interests, such as gardening, the arts, reading and music. She was an active member of the fraternal order known as the Rosicrucians.

In 1951, when her husband left his starring role as 'Steve Wilson' on the very popular radio show, Big Town, they retired to Rappahannock County, Virginia. She died there of heart failure on April 13, 1984, at the age of 85. She did not have any children.

Helen Shipman has sometimes been confused with Helena Shipman who was born in the State of Washington and who married actor Robert Keith and had a son, Brian Keith, who became a famous actor in the movies and on TV. Helena Shipman was also a stage actress for a while, but never achieved the fame which Helen Shipman attained.

NOTE: Information contained in this article was taken from the book titled "Edward Joel Pawley: Broadway's Elmer Gantry, Radio's Steve Wilson, and Hollywood's Perennial Bad Guy", Outskirts Press, 2006, by Robert Gibson Corder, Ph.D.

== Filmography ==
Year	Title	Role	Notes
1925	A Little Girl in a Big City	Rose McGuire	
1929	The Great Power	Peggy Wray	
1933	Meet the Baron	Member of Welcoming Trio	Uncredited
1933	Christopher Bean	Ada Haggett	
1934	Double Door	Louise	
1935	Naughty Marietta	Marietta Franini	Uncredited
1935	Men Without Names	Becky	
1936	Wife vs. Secretary	Ice Skater Whose Feet Hurt	Uncredited
1936	Small Town Girl	Second Nurse	Uncredited
1936	San Francisco	Earthquake Survivor	Uncredited
1936	The Phantom Rider	Lizzie	Serial
1937	The Road Back	Dutch Comedy Team	Uncredited
1940	The House Across the Bay	Prisoner's Wife	Uncredited, (final film role)
