= Christopher Bean =

1933 film

- Directed by: Sam Wood
- Written by: Laurence E. Johnson; Sylvia Thalberg
- Based on: The Late Christopher Bean by Sidney Howard; Prenez garde à la peinture by René Fauchois
- Produced by: Harry Rapf
- Starring: Marie Dressler; Lionel Barrymore; Helen Mack; Beulah Bondi; Russell Hardie
- Cinematography: William H. Daniels
- Edited by: Hugh Wynn
- Music by: Herbert Stothart
- Production company: Metro-Goldwyn-Mayer
- Distributed by: Loew's, Inc.
- Release date: November 17, 1933
- Running time: 75 minutes
- Country: United States
- Language: English

Christopher Bean is a 1933 American pre-Code comedy film directed by Sam Wood and written by Laurence E. Johnson and Sylvia Thalberg, based on the 1932 play, The Late Christopher Bean, by Sidney Howard. The film stars Marie Dressler, Lionel Barrymore, Helen Mack, Beulah Bondi, and Russell Hardie. The film was released on November 17, 1933, by Metro-Goldwyn-Mayer. It was Dressler's final role before her death from cancer in July 1934.

== Plot ==
After learning that several paintings by deceased artist Christopher Bean, whose life few people know anything about, may be located at the home of Dr. Milton Haggett, New York art critic Maxwell Davenport and rival art dealers Rosen and Tallant set off for Haggett's Massachusetts home. There, the unsuspecting, impoverished Haggett family receives a telegram from Davenport, informing them that he'll arrive at noon to discuss Bean, his favorite artist. Milton and Hannah Haggett and their unmarried daughters, Susan and Ada, are surprised by the telegram, as they had always regarded Bean as a failed incompetent. Only their maid, Abby, who is about to quit and leave for Chicago, has fond memories of the dead painter.

Before Davenport's arrival, Warren Creamer, a former student of Bean's who makes his living as a paperhanger, comes by the Haggett house to court Susan. Because Warren's prospects appear dim, Susan's social-climbing mother discourages his visit, while Ada, who is determined to marry before her younger sister does, boldly competes for his attentions. When Warren makes clear his intentions to marry Susan, however, Ada and her mother angrily throw him out of the house.

A short time later, Tallant arrives; while posing as the magnanimous Davenport, he gives Milton one hundred dollars as payment for Bean's long-outstanding medical bills. Surprised by his apparent good fortune, Milton happily gives Tallant a Bean painting, which he had been using to stop leaks in his chicken house. When Tallant learns that the back of another Bean painting has been used as a canvas by Ada, he buys her amateurish painting for fifty dollars. Later, Abby—who has agreed to help Susan and Warren elope—is approached by the conniving Tallant, who knows that Bean had a special rapport with her. She reveals that Bean painted a portrait of her just before he died but refuses to sell it to Tallant.

Moments later, Rosen shows up at the house and offers Milton $1,000 for any Bean paintings he has. Before Milton agrees to Rosen's deal, Davenport arrives and, after identifying himself, explains to the Haggetts that Bean's work is now worth tens of thousands of dollars. The Haggetts then receive a telegram from the New York Metropolitan Museum, which offers them a sizable sum for their Bean paintings. Inspired by the promise of big money, the Haggetts begin a desperate search throughout the house, but quit when Hannah finally confesses that, years before, she threw a bundle of Bean canvases into a bonfire.

Determined to cash in on their old acquaintance, Milton, Hannah and Ada try to trick the still-uninformed Abby out of her portrait by offering to buy it for fifty dollars. After Abby refuses to sell, the painting's true worth is revealed to her, and she angrily decries her employers while admitting that she had saved seventeen canvases from Hannah's fire and has them packed in a trunk. Despite Milton's attempts to bargain with her, Abby hangs on to her paintings and prepares to leave for Chicago. In greedy desperation, Milton snatches the canvases from Abby's trunk, but relents when she states that she married Bean on his deathbed and is his legal widow. On the train to Chicago, Abby then ponders the future of the valuable paintings, while the eloping Susan and Warren plan their future together.

== Cast ==
- Marie Dressler as Abby
- Lionel Barrymore as Dr. Milton Haggett
- Helen Mack as Susan Haggett
- Beulah Bondi as Mrs. Hannah Haggett
- Russell Hardie as Warren Creamer
- Jean Hersholt as Rosen
- H. B. Warner as Maxwell Davenport
- Helen Shipman as Ada Haggett
- George Coulouris as Tallent
