= Fickling Mill, Georgia =

Unincorporated community in Georgia, U.S.

Coordinates: 32°39′15″N 84°10′40″W

Fickling Mill is an unincorporated community in Taylor County, in the U.S. state of Georgia.

== History ==
The community was named for one Dr. Fickling, an early settler and Civil War veteran. Variant names were "Fickling", "Ficklings Mill", "Ficklins Mill", and "Flickins Mill". A post office called Fickling was established in 1887, and remained in operation until 1903.
