= Meadow Grove Farm =

Historic farm in Virginia, US

- U.S. National Register of Historic Places
- U.S. Historic district
- Virginia Landmarks Register
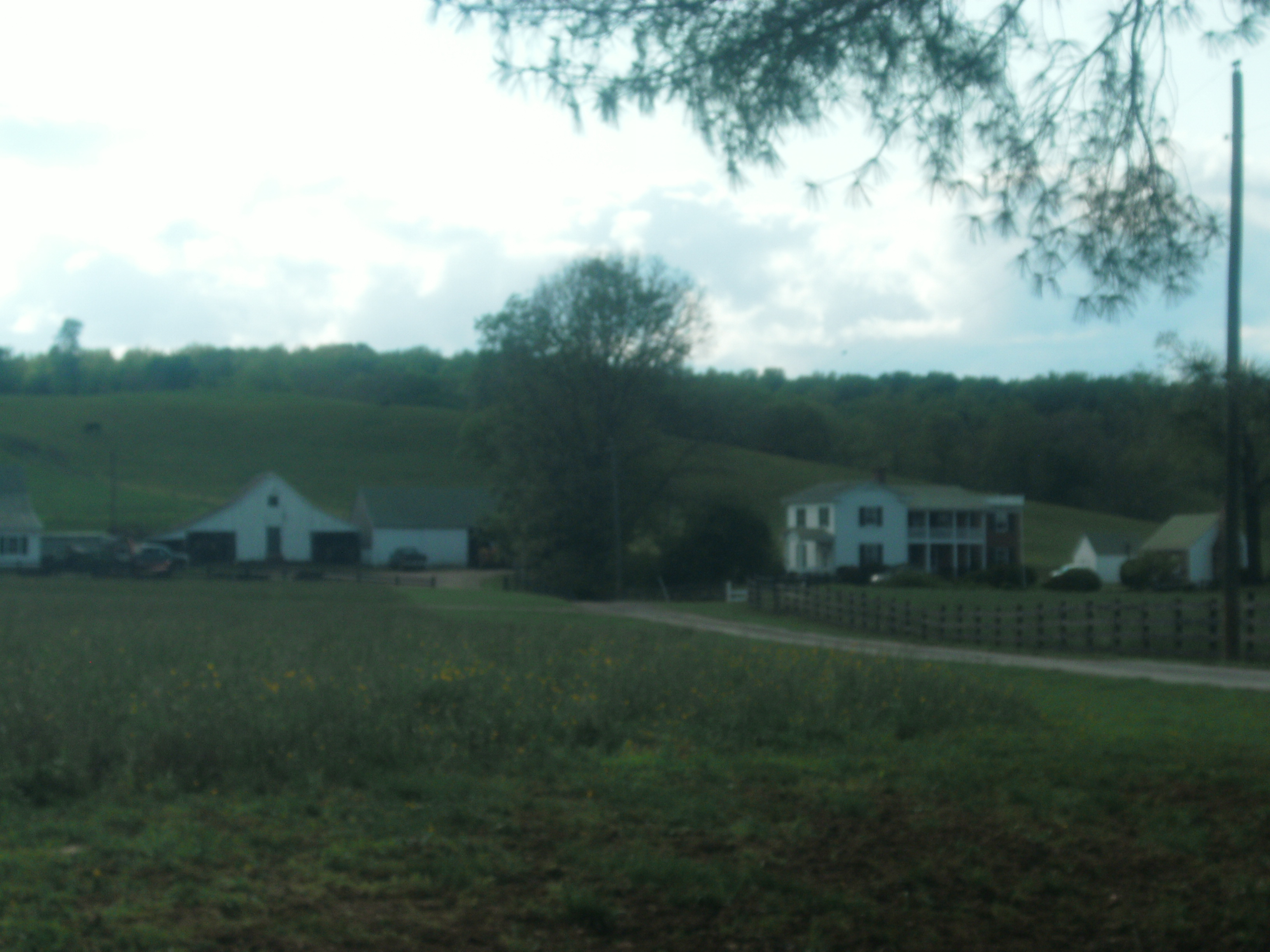
- A portion of the property, including the main house, seen in May, 2016

- Location within Virginia Location within the United States
- Location: 21 Meadow Grove Ln., Amissville, Virginia
- Coordinates: 38°40′50″N 78°04′48″W
- Area: 346.8 acres (140.3 ha)
- Built: c. 1820, c. 1860
- Architectural style: Greek Revival
- NRHP reference No.: 06000803
- VLR No.: 078-0059

Significant dates
- Added to NRHP: September 5, 2006
- Designated VLR: June 8, 2006

Meadow Grove Farm is a historic farm complex and national historic district located at Amissville, Rappahannock County, Virginia. It encompasses 13 contributing buildings and 5 contributing sites. The main house was constructed in four distinct building phases from about 1820 to 1965. The oldest section is a 1 1/2-story log structure, with a two-story Greek Revival style main block added about 1860. A two-story brick addition, built in 1965, replaced a two-story wing added in 1881. In addition to the main house the remaining contributing resources include a tenant house/slave quarters, a schoolhouse, a summer kitchen, a meat house, a machine shed, a blacksmith shop, a barn, a chicken coop, a chicken house, two granaries, and a corn crib; a cemetery, an icehouse ruin, two former sites of the present schoolhouse, and the original site of the log granary.

It was added to the National Register of Historic Places in 2006.
