= Burtsboro, Georgia =

Unincorporated community in Georgia, U.S.

Coordinates: 34°28′42″N 84°05′23″W

Burtsboro is an unincorporated community in Lumpkin County, in the U.S. state of Georgia.

== History ==
A post office called Burtsboro was in operation from 1893 until 1929. The community derives its name from Ray and W. J. Burr, local merchants.
