= Rock Mills, Virginia =

Unincorporated community in Virginia, US

Coordinates: 38°39′18″N 78°07′46″W

Rock Mills is an unincorporated community in Rappahannock County, in the U.S. state of Virginia.
