= Viewtown, Virginia =

Unincorporated community in Virginia, US

Coordinates: 38°38′21″N 78°02′22″W

Viewtown is an unincorporated community in Rappahannock County, in the U.S. state of Virginia.
