= Waterloo =

Waterloo most commonly refers to:

- Battle of Waterloo, 1815 battle in which Napoleon was defeated for the last time
- Waterloo, Belgium, the location of the battle

Waterloo may also refer to:

== Other places ==
=== Australia ===
- Waterloo, New South Wales
- Waterloo, Queensland
- Waterloo, South Australia
- Waterloo Bay, now Elliston, South Australia
- Waterloo, Victoria
- Waterloo, Western Australia

=== Canada ===
- Waterloo, Nova Scotia
- Regional Municipality of Waterloo, a region in Ontario
  - Waterloo, Ontario, a city
  - Waterloo (federal electoral district)
  - Waterloo (provincial electoral district)
  - Waterloo County, Ontario (1853–1973)
  - University of Waterloo
- Waterloo, Quebec
- Waterloo Village, Saint John, a neighbourhood in Saint John, New Brunswick

=== United Kingdom ===
==== England ====
- Waterloo, Dorset, a suburb of Poole
- Waterloo, Huddersfield, a suburb
- Waterloo, London, area around Waterloo Station
- Waterloo Place, London, a street in the St James's area
- Waterloo, Merseyside
  - Waterloo (UK Parliament constituency)
- Waterloo, Whixall, Shropshire
- Waterlooville, known earlier as Waterloo, Hampshire, a town

==== Scotland ====
- Waterloo, North Lanarkshire
- Waterloo, Perth and Kinross

==== Northern Ireland ====
- Waterloo Bay

==== Wales ====
- Waterloo, Caerphilly

=== United States ===
- Waterloo, Alabama
- Waterloo, California
- Waterloo, Georgia
- Waterloo, Illinois
  - Waterloo Historic District (Illinois)
- Waterloo, Indiana, in DeKalb County
- Waterloo, Fayette County, Indiana
- Waterloo, Johnson County, Indiana
- Waterloo, Iowa
- Waterloo, Kansas
- Waterloo, Louisiana
- Waterloo, Maryland
- Waterloo (Princess Anne, Maryland), a historic home
- Waterloo State Recreation Area, in Michigan
- Waterloo, Clark County, Missouri, an unincorporated community
- Waterloo, Lafayette County, Missouri, an unincorporated community
- Waterloo, Montana
- Waterloo, Nebraska
- Waterloo Historic District (Warner, New Hampshire)
- Waterloo, Monmouth County, New Jersey
- Waterloo Village, New Jersey
- Waterloo, New York, a town
  - Waterloo (village), New York
- Waterloo (Albertson, North Carolina), a historic plantation house
- Waterloo, Ohio
- Waterloo, Oregon
- Waterloo, South Carolina
- Waterloo, Texas (former name for Austin, Texas)
- Waterloo, Clarke County, Virginia
- Waterloo, Culpeper County, Virginia
- Waterloo, Fauquier County, Virginia
- Waterloo, New Kent County, Virginia
- Waterloo, West Virginia
- Waterloo, Grant County, Wisconsin, a town
- Waterloo, Jefferson County, Wisconsin, a town
  - Waterloo, Wisconsin, a city within the town
  - Waterloo Downtown Historic District (Waterloo, Wisconsin)

=== Elsewhere ===
- King George Island (South Shetland Islands), Antarctica, known in Russian as Ватерло́о ('Vaterloo')
- Waterloo Road, Hong Kong, a road in Kowloon, Hong Kong
- Waterloo, New Zealand
- Waterloo, Sierra Leone
- Waterloo, Suriname

== Arts, entertainment and media ==
=== Film and television ===
- Waterloo (1929 film), a German silent film
- Waterloo (1970 film), an epic period war drama
- "Waterloo" (Mad Men), an episode of Mad Men
- Waterloo Road (TV series), a BBC drama series

=== Music ===
- Waterloo & Robinson, an Austrian band
- Waterloo Music Company, a Canadian music publishing and musical instrument retailing firm
- Waterloo Records, an independent music store in Austin, Texas
- Waterloo (album), by ABBA, 1974
  - "Waterloo" (song), Eurovision winner in 1974
- "Waterloo" (Stonewall Jackson song), 1959
- "Waterloo", a song by IcedEarth from the 2004 album The Glorious Burden

=== Other uses in arts and entertainment ===
- Waterloo (video game), a 1989 strategic computer game
- Waterloo Campaign (video game), from Design, Inc
- Waterloo (board game), a Napoleonic board wargame
- Waterloo (blog post), a 2010 online commentary by David Frum about the Affordable Care Act
- Waterloo: The History of Four Days, Three Armies and Three Battles, a 2014 history book by Bernard Cornwell

== Transportation ==
- Waterloo Airport (disambiguation)
- Waterloo station (disambiguation)
- Waterloo (ship), the name of several ships
  - HMS Waterloo, the name of several ships of the Royal Navy

== Other uses ==
- Waterloo Chamber, Windsor Castle
- Waterloo (horse) (foaled 1969), a British thoroughbred racehorse
- Waterloo cheese, a British cheese
- Waterloo Cup, an English coursing event 1836–2005
- Waterloo F.C., an English rugby union team
- Waterloo Gasoline Engine Company, a former American tractor maker
- Waterloo Hydrogeologic, a former software and consulting company
- University of Waterloo, in Ontario, Canada

== See also ==
- Battle of Waterloo (disambiguation)
- Waterloo Bridge (disambiguation)
- Waterloo Creek (disambiguation)
- Waterloo High School (disambiguation)
- Waterloo Historic District (disambiguation)
- Waterloo Memorial (disambiguation)
- Waterloo Road (disambiguation)
- Waterloo Square (disambiguation)
- "Waterloo Sunset", a 1967 song by The Kinks
- Waterloo Town Hall, Merseyside, England
- Waterloo Town Hall, Sydney, New South Wales, Australia
