= U.S. Route 211 =

Highway in the United States

U.S. Route 211
- US 211 highlighted in red

Route information
- Auxiliary route of US 11
- Maintained by VDOT
- Length: 59.09 mi (95.10 km)
- Existed: 1926–present
- Tourist routes: Virginia Byway

Major junctions
- West end: I-81 / SR 211 in New Market
- US 11 in New Market; US 340 in Luray; Skyline Drive near Panorama; US 522 in Sperryville; SR 229 near Waterloo
- East end: US 15 Bus. / US 29 Bus. / US 211 Bus. in Warrenton

Location
- Country: United States
- State: Virginia
- Counties: Shenandoah, Page, Rappahannock, Culpeper, Fauquier

Highway system
- United States Numbered Highway System; List; Special; Divided; Virginia Routes; Interstate; US; Primary; Secondary; Byways; History; HOT lanes
← SR 210	→ SR 211

U.S. Route 211 (US 211) is a spur of US 11 in the U.S. state of Virginia. Known for most of its length as Lee Highway, the U.S. Highway runs 59.09 miles (95.10 km) from Interstate 81 (I-81) and Virginia State Route 211 (SR 211) in New Market east to US 15 Business, US 29 Business, and US 211 Business in Warrenton. US 211 connects the Shenandoah Valley with the Piedmont town of Warrenton via Luray and Sperryville, where the highway runs concurrently with US 340 and US 522, respectively.

== Route description ==
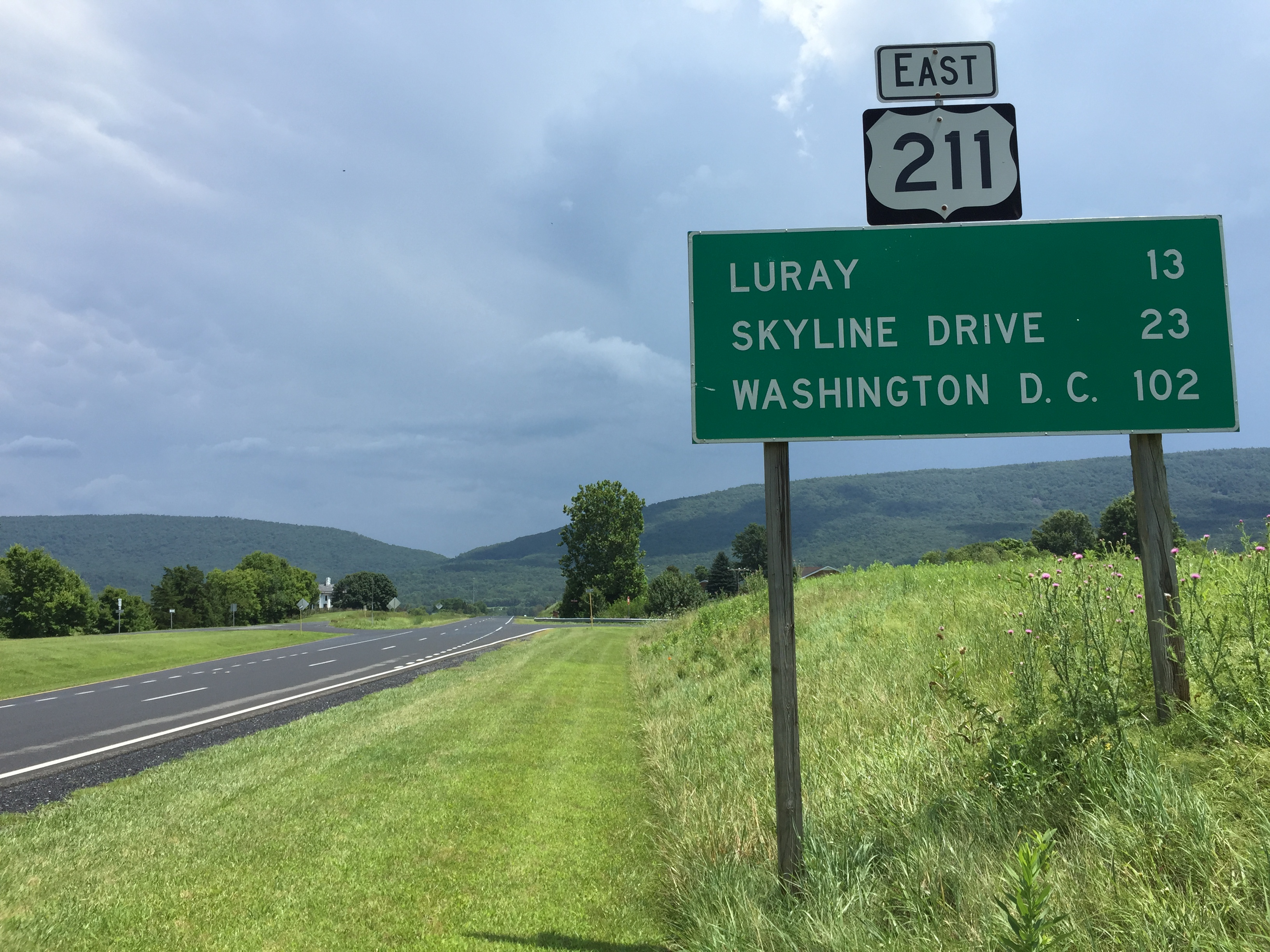
View east along US 211 in Shenandoah County

US 211 begins at a diamond interchange with I-81 just west of the town of New Market. Old Cross Road continues west as SR 211, a state-numbered extension of the U.S. Highway that runs west to Timberville. US 211 heads into the town as a four-lane divided highway that reduces to a two-lane undivided road prior to turning north onto US 11 (Congress Street). The highway runs concurrently with US 11 north to two-lane Lee Highway, onto which US 211 turns east. The U.S. Highway expands to a four-lane divided highway after leaving the town of New Market. US 211 becomes a three-lane road, with two lanes in the ascending direction and one on the descending side, for its curvaceous path over Massanutten Mountain, which summits at New Market Gap at the Shenandoah–Page county line.

US 211 expands to a four-lane divided highway again just west of its junction with US 340 at the hamlet of Intersections. The two highways pass through the hamlets of Salem, Whitehouse Landing—where the highways cross the South Fork Shenandoah River—and pass Luray Caverns at the west end of the town of Luray. US 211 Business (Main Street) passes through the center of town while US 211 and US 340 bypass the town to the north. US 340 splits north at a diamond interchange with Broad Street, which heads south into town as US 340 Business. US 211 crosses over Norfolk Southern Railway's Hagerstown District line just west of its intersection with the east end of US 211 Business (Main Street).

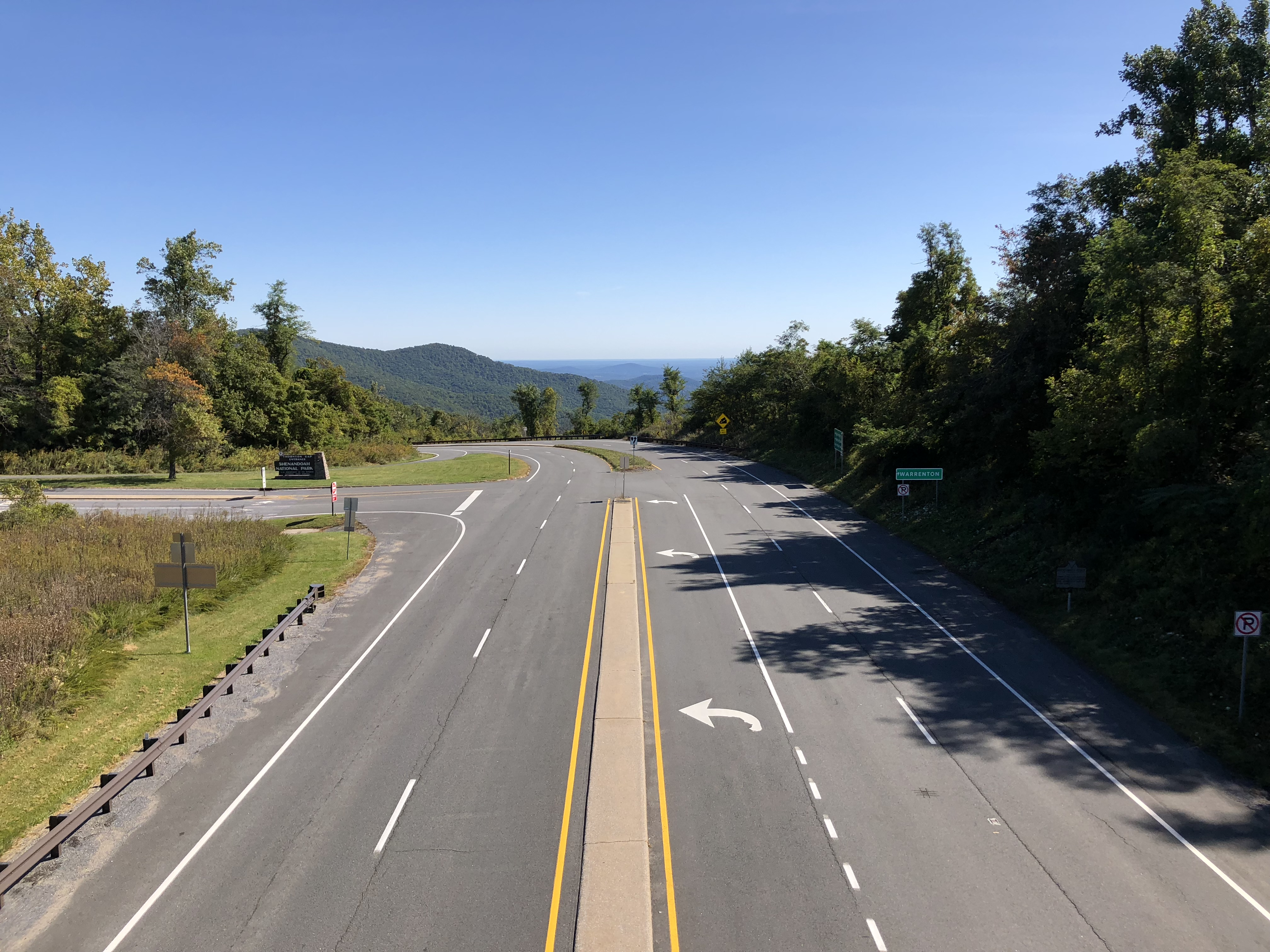
US 211 eastbound at Skyline Drive in Shenandoah National Park

US 211 reduces to three lanes (two ascending, one descending) for its crossing of the Blue Ridge Mountains within Shenandoah National Park. The U.S. Highway reaches its summit at Thornton Gap, where the highway has an interchange with Skyline Drive and enters Rappahannock County. US 211 follows the Thornton River as a two-lane road east to Sperryville, where the highway becomes concurrent with US 522 (Sperryville Pike). The U.S. Highways follow a four-lane divided highway past Rediviva to the Rappahannock County seat of Washington. US 211 Business heads north onto town as Main Street and rejoins US 211 and US 522 as Warren Street adjacent to the historic Calvert Mill/Washington Mill. Just east of Rose Hill, US 522 splits north as Zachary Taylor Highway. US 211 passes through Amissville and briefly through Culpeper County, where the highway meets the northern end of SR 229 (Rixeyville Road).

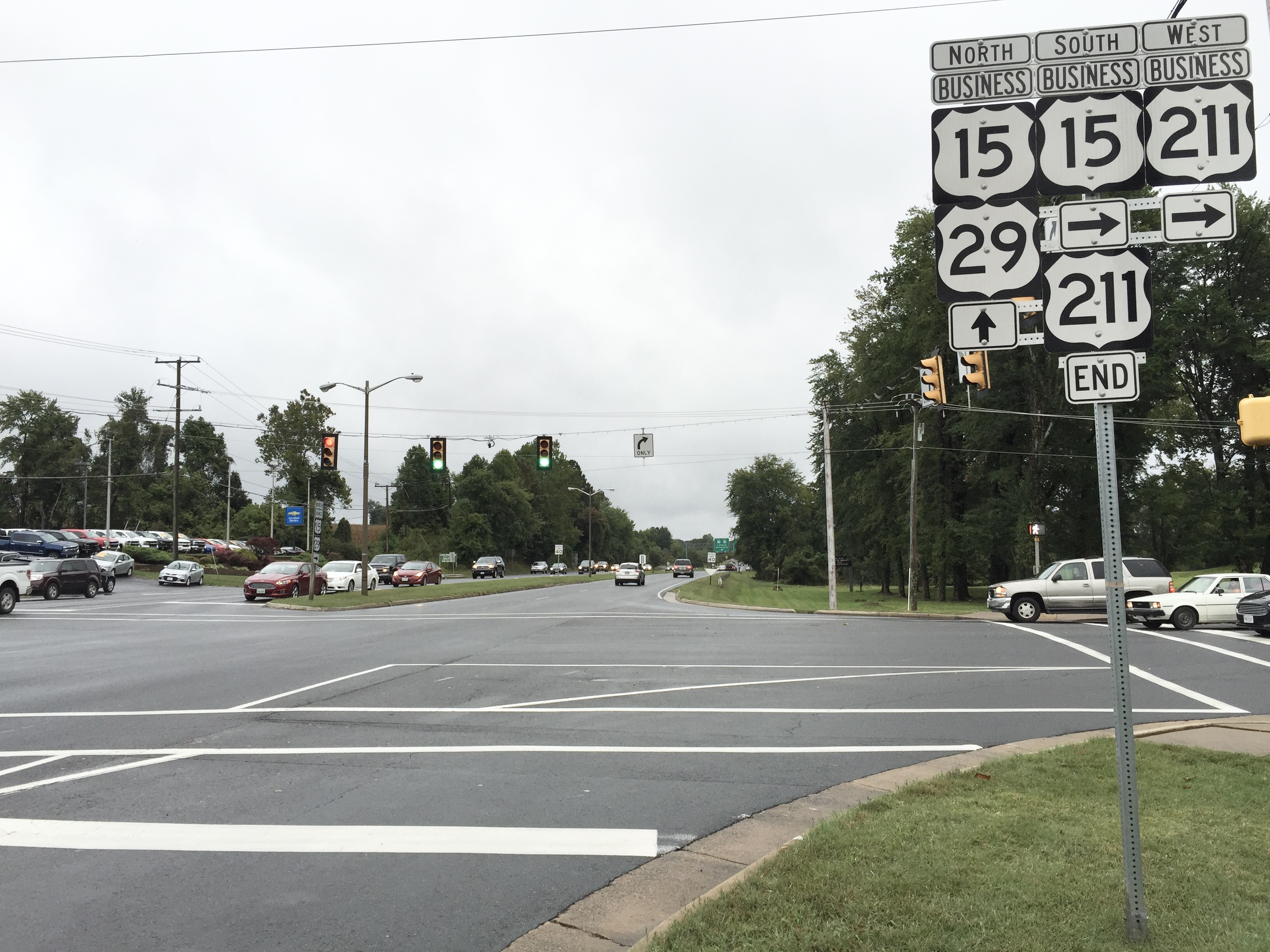
Eastern terminus of US 211 in Warrenton

US 211 crosses the Rappahannock River at Waterloo and enters Fauquier County. The highway enters the town of Warrenton as Frost Street south of Fauquier High School. At its intersection with US 17 Business and US 29 Business (Broadview Avenue), US 211 Business continues straight toward downtown Warrenton as Waterloo Street while the mainline U.S. Highway turns north concurrent with the business routes, which pass through a commercial area. The highway curves east at its northern junction with US 17 Business (Broadview Avenue) and continues as Lee Highway. US 211 reaches its eastern terminus at Blackwell Road, which heads south as US 15 Business and north as SR 672. US 15 Business and US 29 Business continue east along Lee Highway a short distance to their northern termini at an interchange with US 15, US 17, and US 29.

== History ==
=== Precursor: Virginia State Route 21 ===
Virginia State Route 21 was an original state route defined by the Virginia General Assembly as part of a 4,002-mile (6,441 km) state highway system in January 1918. Running from Warrenton through Manassas and Fairfax to the Highway Bridge over the Potomac River at Washington, D.C. In 1921, VA 21 was rerouted around Manassas and also rerouted at Fairfax eastward through Falls Church along Lee Highway to a terminus at the Aqueduct Bridge (replaced by the nearby Key Bridge in 1923). This new route was roughly that of present-day US 29 from Warrenton to Washington, D.C.

Also in December 1921, VA 21 was extended westward from Warrenton to what was then VA 7 at Massies Corner. It was then continued concurrently with VA 7 to Washington, Virginia. The following year, VA 21 was extended yet further west, first to Sperryville concurrent with VA 7, and then west through Luray to a terminus at VA 3 (now US 11) New Market, replacing VA 16.

In 1926 following the creation of U.S. Numbered Highway System, US 211 and US 50 designations were added to VA 21 (US 211 from New Market to Fairfax and US 50 from Fairfax to Washington, D.C.). In July 1933, VA 21 was removed from the state highway system as part of a commonwealth-wide renumbering scheme.

=== US 211 ===
US 211 was an original US Highway, debuting in late 1926. It ran concurrently with the portion of what was then Virginia State Route 21 from New Market to Fairfax. US 211 begins on Old Cross Road. In 1928, US 211 was extended eastward to Washington, D.C., along the remainder of VA 21, replacing what had been US 50. (US 50 was relocated to the south along the route of what is now VA 236 from Fairfax to Alexandria.)

In 1934, US 29 was added to the route of US 211 from Warrenton to Washington, D.C. When it was extended to Washington, D.C. it was about 101 miles long.

In July 1980, the US 29/US 211 concurrency was eliminated. The eastern terminus of US 211 was truncated from Washington, D.C., to its current end in Warrenton, leaving US 29 on that route.

== Major intersections ==
County	Location	mi	km	Destinations	Notes
Shenandoah	New Market	0.00	0.00	I-81 / SR 211 west (Old Cross Road) – Mount Jackson, Staunton, Battlefield Park	Western terminus; I-81 exit 264
Shenandoah	New Market	0.26	0.42	US 11 south (Congress Street) / Old Cross Road (SR 1002) – Staunton, Endless Caverns	West end of US 11 overlap
Shenandoah	New Market	0.53	0.85	US 11 north (Congress Street) to I-81 north – Winchester, Shenandoah Caverns	East end of US 11 overlap
Page	Intersections	7.15	11.51	US 340 south – Stanley, Shenandoah	West end of US 340 overlap
Page	Luray	12.97	20.87	US 211 Bus. east (West Main Street) – Luray Business District	
Page	Luray	14.75	23.74	US 340 north / US 340 Bus. south – Luray, Front Royal	Interchange; east end of US 340 overlap
Page		17.22	27.71	US 211 Bus. west / SR 739 (Veterans Lane) – Luray	
Page	Thornton Gap	23.62	38.01	Skyline Drive – Shenandoah National Park	Interchange
Rappahannock	Sperryville	30.71	49.42	US 522 south (Sperryville Pike) to SR 231 – Culpeper, Sperryville, Historic District	West end of US 522 overlap
Rappahannock		35.33	56.86	US 211 Bus. east (Main Street) – Washington, VA	
Rappahannock		36.42	58.61	US 211 Bus. west (Warren Avenue) – Washington, VA	
Rappahannock	Massies Corner	38.80	62.44	US 522 north (Zachary Taylor Highway) / SR 675 (Old Massies Corner Road) – Front Royal, Winchester	East end of US 522 overlap
Rappahannock	Ben Venue			SR 729 (Ben Venue Road / Richmond Road)	former SR 242
Culpeper		50.92	81.95	SR 229 south (Rixeyville Road) – Culpeper	
Fauquier	Warrenton	57.68	92.83	US 17 Bus. south / US 29 Bus. south (West Shirley Avenue) / US 211 Bus. east (Waterloo Street) – Culpeper, Fredericksburg	West end of US 17 Bus. and US 29 Bus. overlaps
Fauquier	Warrenton	58.54	94.21	US 17 Bus. north (Broadview Avenue) – Winchester	East end of US 17 Bus. overlap
Fauquier	Warrenton	59.09	95.10	US 15 Bus. / US 29 Bus. north / US 211 Bus. west (Lee Highway / Blackwell Road / SR 672) – Leesburg, Washington	Eastern terminus; east end of US 29 Bus. overlap
1.000 mi = 1.609 km; 1.000 km = 0.621 mi: Concurrency terminus

== Special routes ==
=== Luray business route ===
U.S. Route 211 Business
- Location: Luray
- Length: 4.10 mi (6.60 km)

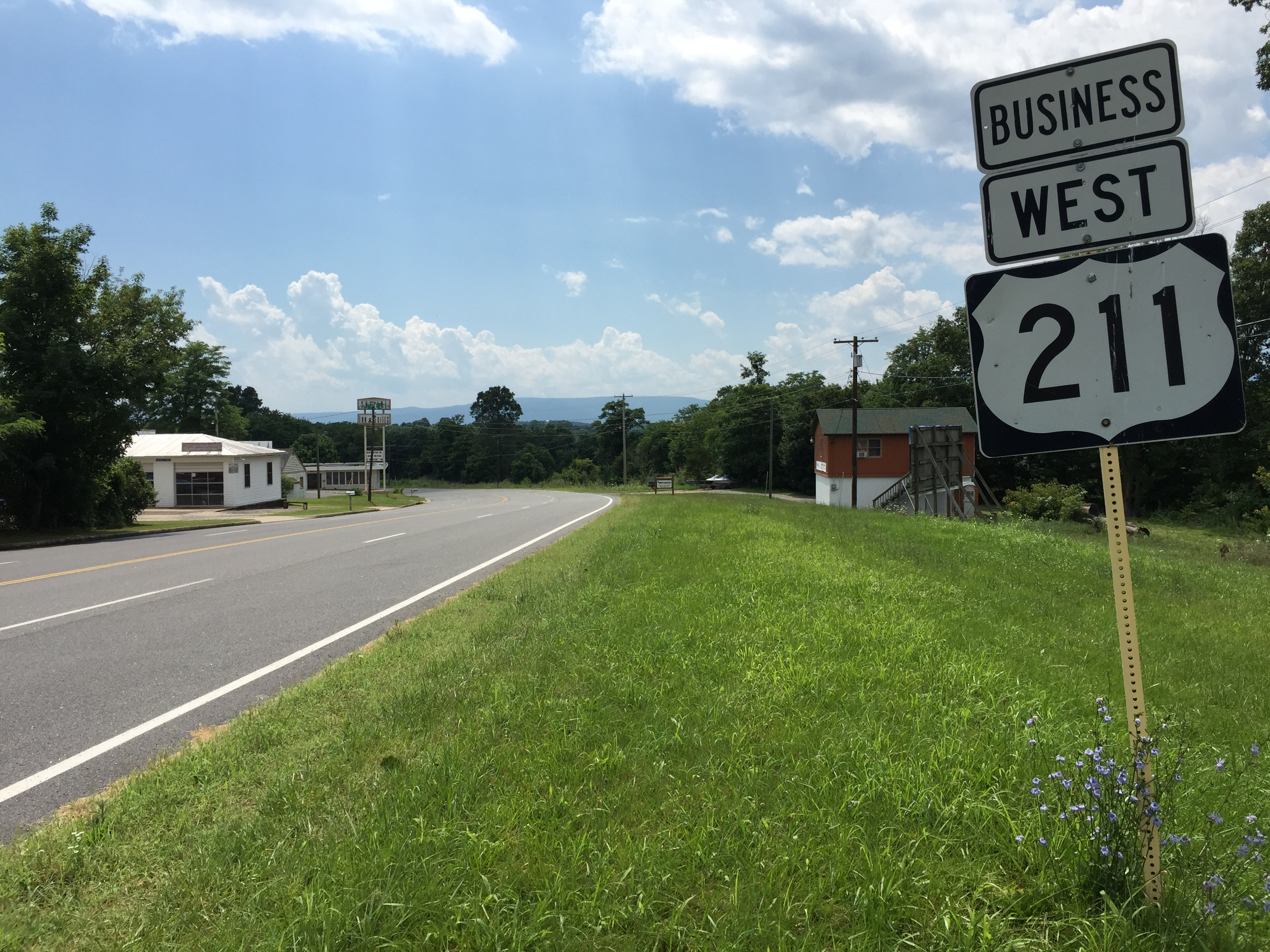
View west along US 211 Bus. west of US 211 just east of Luray

U.S. Route 211 Business (US 211 Business) is a business route of US 211 in Page County. The highway runs 4.10 miles (6.60 km) between from US 211 and US 340 west of Luray to US 211 east of Luray. US 211 Business follows Main Street through the downtown area, where the business route crosses Hawksbill Creek and intersects US 340 Business, which heads south as Virginia Avenue and north as Broad Street to reconnect with US 340. At the east edge of downtown, US 211 Business has an at-grade intersection with Norfolk Southern Railway's Hagerstown District, which the highway parallels to its eastern terminus at US 211 east of the town.

=== Washington business route ===
U.S. Route 211 Business
- Location: Washington
- Length: 1.50 mi (2.41 km)

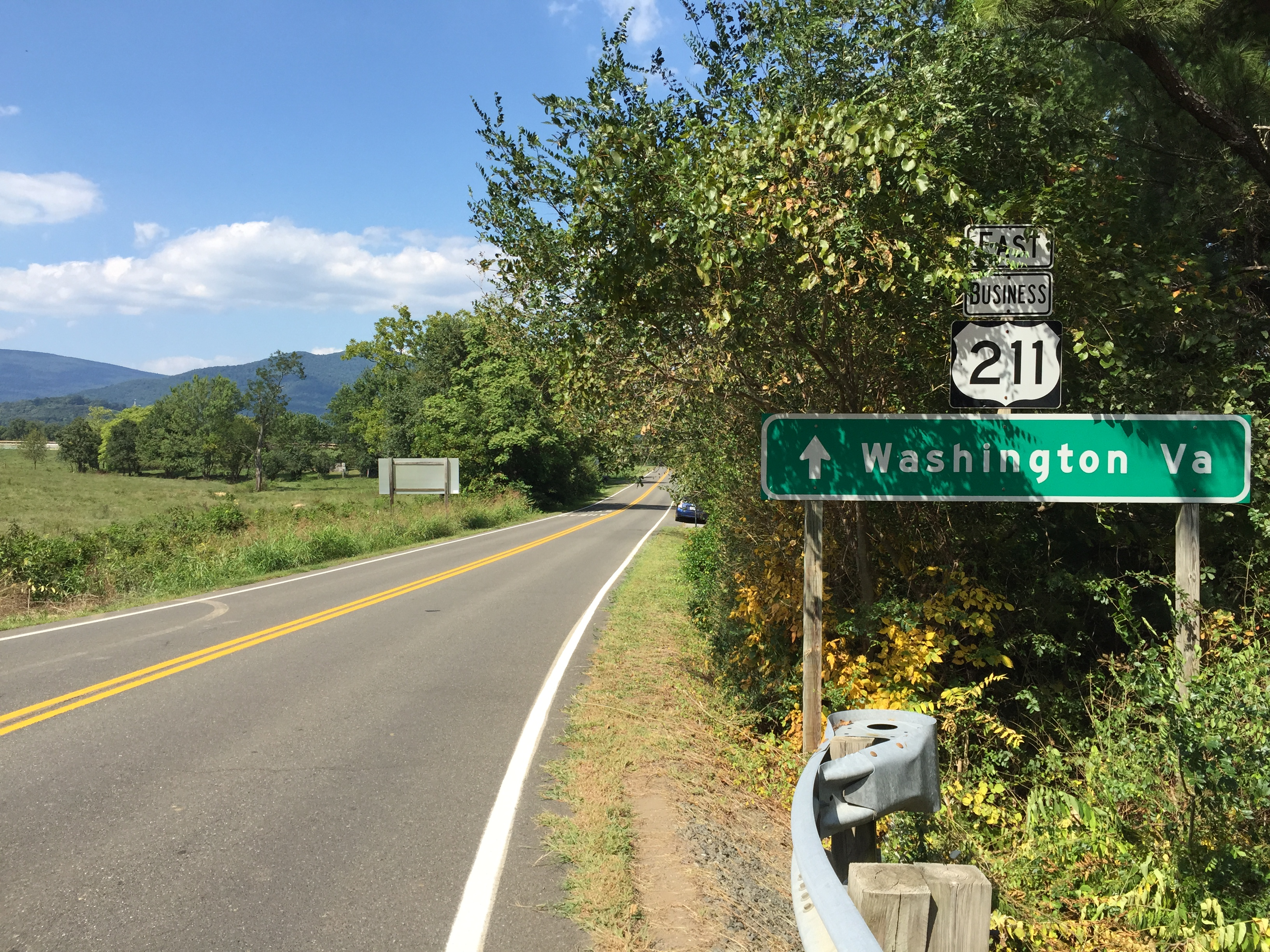
View east along US 211 Bus. and north along US 522 Bus. at US 211/US 522 near Washington

U.S. Route 211 Business (US 211 Business) is a business route of US 211 in Rappahannock County. The highway runs 1.50 miles (2.41 km) between junctions with US 211 and US 522 on the south and east sides, respectively, of Washington. US 211 Business, which is coexistent with unsigned US 522 Business for its entire length, follows Main Street to the center of town and turns east onto Warren Avenue to return to US 211. The business route serves many art galleries and inns, including The Inn at Little Washington.

=== Warrenton business route ===
U.S. Route 211 Business
- Location: Warrenton
- Length: 1.76 mi (2.83 km)

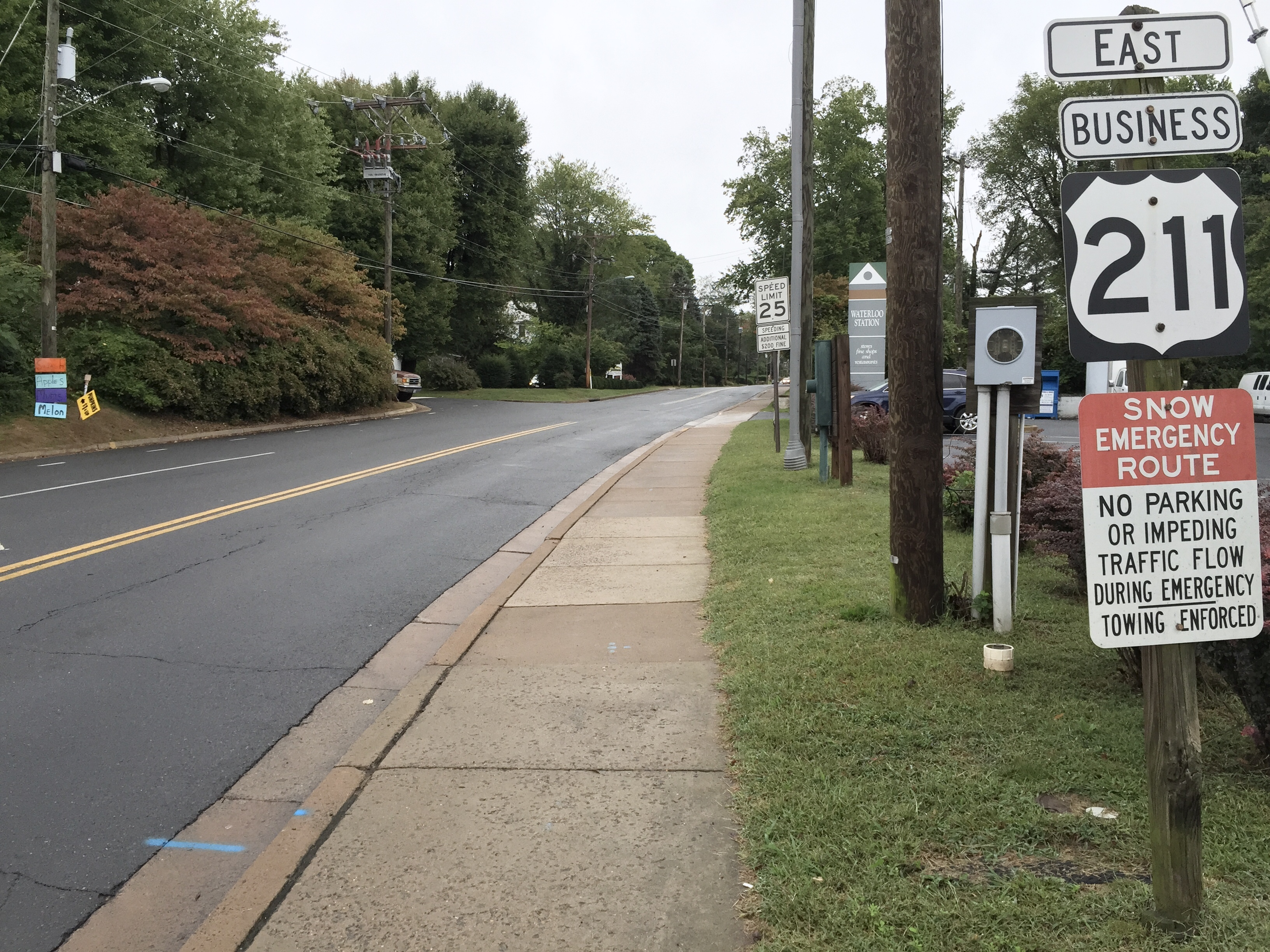
View east at the west end of US 211 Bus. at US 211/US 17 Bus./US 29 Bus. in Warrenton

U.S. Route 211 Business (US 211 Business) is a business route of US 211 in Fauquier County. The highway runs 1.76 miles (2.83 km) from US 211, US 17 Business, and US 29 Business on the west side of Warrenton east to US 211, US 15 Business, and US 29 Business on the north side of Warrenton. The latter intersection also serves as the eastern terminus of US 211. US 211 Business heads east as Waterloo Street into the center of Warrenton. At US 15 Business (Main Street), the business route veers north onto Alexandria Pike. When Alexandria Pike veers east, US 211 Business and US 15 Business continue north on Blackwell Road to the former business route's northern terminus at Lee Highway.

< SR 20	Two‑digit State Routes; 1923-1933	SR 22 >
