= Waterloo, Virginia =

Several places in the U.S. state of Virginia are known as Waterloo:

- Waterloo, Clarke County, Virginia
- Waterloo, Culpeper County, Virginia
- Waterloo, Fauquier County, Virginia
- Waterloo, New Kent County, Virginia
