= Virginia State Route 229 =

State highway in Culpeper County, Virginia, US

State Route 229

Route information
- Maintained by VDOT
- Length: 14.66 mi (23.59 km)
- Existed: 1947–present

Major junctions
- South end: US 15 Bus. / US 29 Bus. in Culpeper
- North end: US 211 near Waterloo

Location
- Country: United States
- State: Virginia
- Counties: Culpeper

Highway system
- Virginia Routes; Interstate; US; Primary; Secondary; Byways; History; HOT lanes
← SR 228	→ SR 230

State Route 229 (SR 229) is a primary state highway in the U.S. state of Virginia. Known for most of its length as Rixeyville Road, the state highway runs 14.66 miles (23.59 km) from U.S. Route 15 Business and US 29 Business in Culpeper north to US 211 near Waterloo. SR 229 connects Culpeper with Catalpa and Rixeyville in northern Culpeper County.

== Route description ==
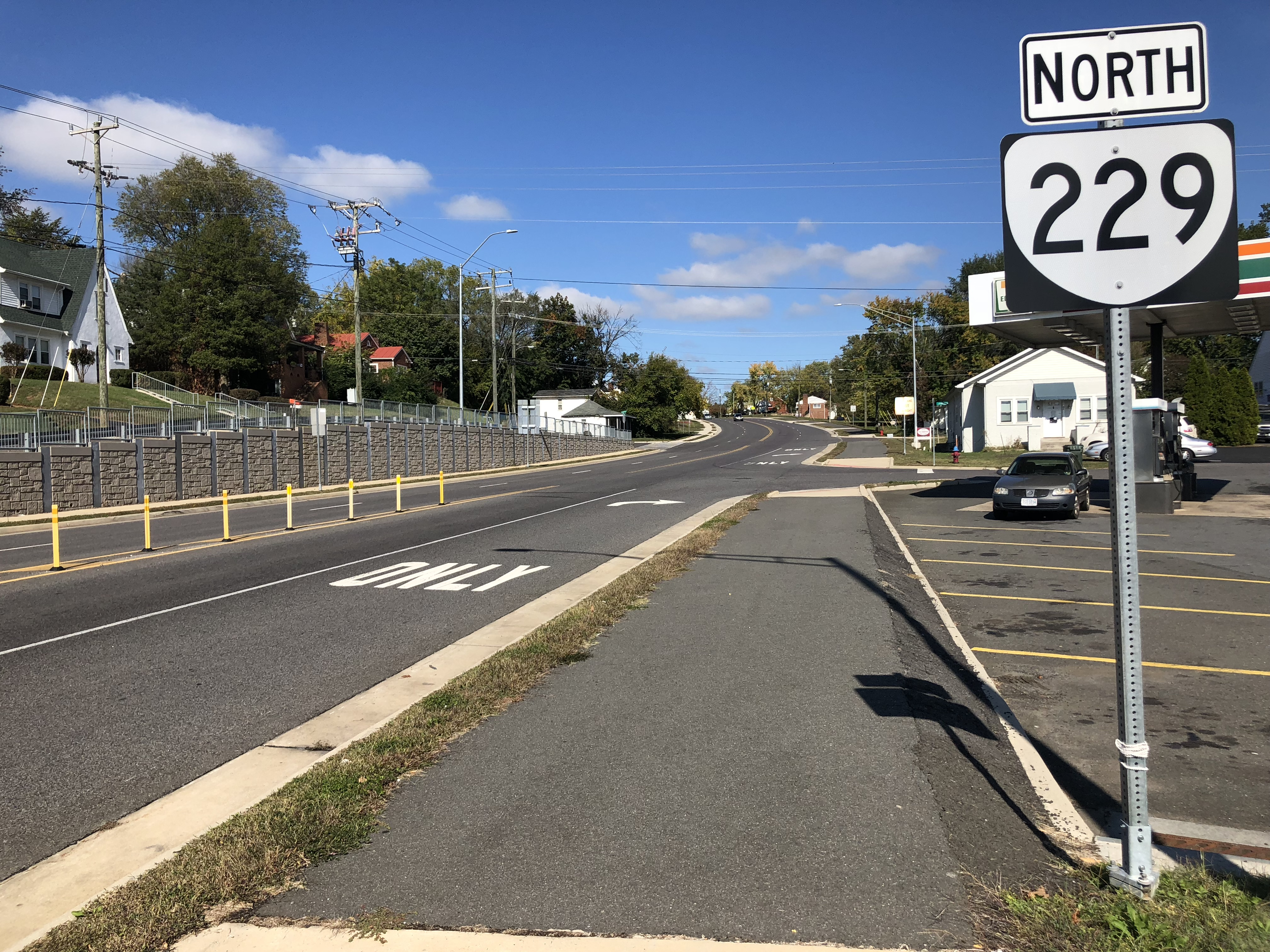
View north at the south end of SR 229 at US 15 Bus./US 29 Bus. in Culpeper

SR 229 begins on a tangent with US 15 Business and US 29 Business in the town of Culpeper. The business routes head south as Main Street and veer east as James Madison Highway to reconnect with US 15 and US 29 northeast of Culpeper. SR 229 heads north as two-lane undivided Main Street, which becomes Rixeyville Road when the highway leaves the town and passes through the hamlet of Catalpa, the site of the plantation Catalpa. The state highway passes through the village of Rixeyville before crossing the Hazel River, a tributary of the Rappahannock River. SR 229 passes to the west of Little Fork Church and the village of Jeffersonton before reaching its northern terminus at US 211 (Lee Highway) a short distance west of the U.S. Highway's crossing of the Rappahannock River a short distance south of the Fauquier County village of Waterloo.

== Major intersections ==
The entire route is in Culpeper County.

Location	mi	km	Destinations	Notes
Culpeper	0.00	0.00	US 15 Bus. / US 29 Bus. (Main Street / James Madison Highway)	Roundabout; southern terminus
	14.66	23.59	US 211 (Lee Highway) – Sperryville, Warrenton, Gainesville	Northern terminus
1.000 mi = 1.609 km; 1.000 km = 0.621 mi

< SR 212	Spurs of SR 21; 1923–1928	none
