= Waterloo Historic District =

Waterloo Historic District, or variations, may refer to:

in the United States

- Waterloo Historic District (Waterloo, Illinois), listed on the National Register of Historic Places (NRHP) in Monroe County
- Waterloo Historic District (Warner, New Hampshire), NRHP-listed in Merrimack County
- Waterloo Downtown Historic District (Waterloo, New York), listed on the NRHP in Seneca County
- Waterloo Mills Historic District, Waterloo Mills, Pennsylvania, NRHP-listed
- Waterloo Downtown Historic District (Waterloo, Wisconsin), NRHP-listed in Jefferson County

== See also ==
- Waterloo (disambiguation)
