= Battle of Waterloo (disambiguation) =

The Battle of Waterloo was a decisive European battle of 1815.

Battle of Waterloo may also refer to:

- "Battle of Waterloo" (song), a song for piano written by G. Anderson in the 1860s
- The Battle of Waterloo (film), a 1913 feature film
- The Battle of Waterloo (painting, Sadler II), an 1815 oil painting by William Sadler II
- The Battle of Waterloo (Pieneman painting)
- The Battle of Waterloo (Allan), an 1843 painting by William Allan
- The Battle of Waterloo: The British Squares Receiving the Charge of the French Cuirassiers, an 1874 painting by Philippoteaux
- Waterloo (1970 film) or The Battle of Waterloo, a Soviet-Italian film
- "Battle of Waterloo", a song by Running Wild from the album Death or Glory

== See also ==
- Waterloo (disambiguation)
- Battle of Waterloo reenactment, held annually at the historical battlefield
- Category:Works about the Battle of Waterloo
