= Virginia State Route 29 =

The following highways in Virginia have been known as State Route 29:

- State Route 29 (Virginia 1923–1933), now mostly Virginia State Route 14
- U.S. Route 29 in Virginia, 1931–present
- State Route 29 (Virginia 1933-1947), Culpeper to Warrenton
