= Hughes River =

Hughes River may refer to:

- Hughes River (Virginia)
- Hughes River (West Virginia)

== See also ==
- Hughes (disambiguation)
