= Thornton River =

Waterway in Virginia

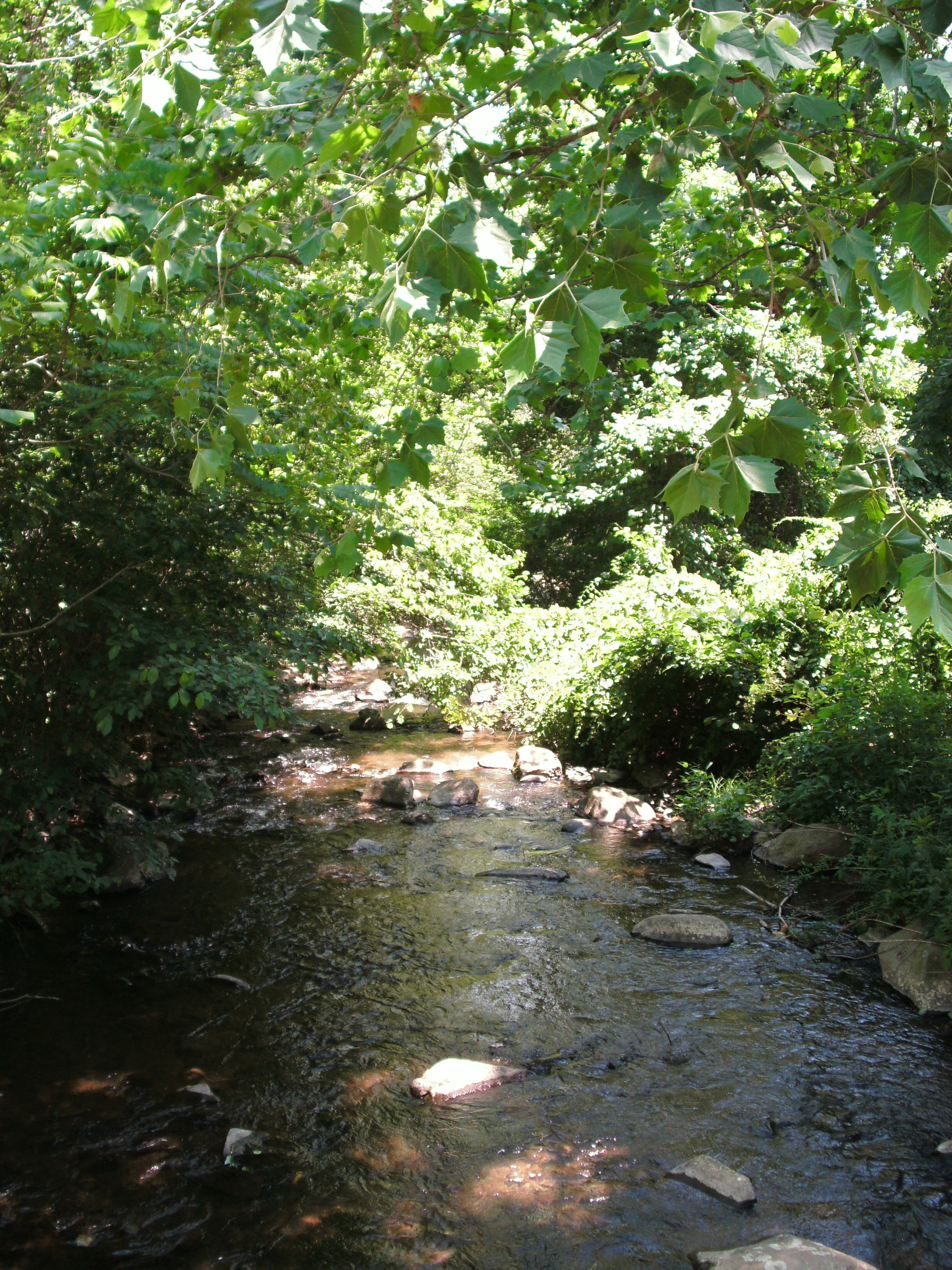
The Thornton River, near Sperryville

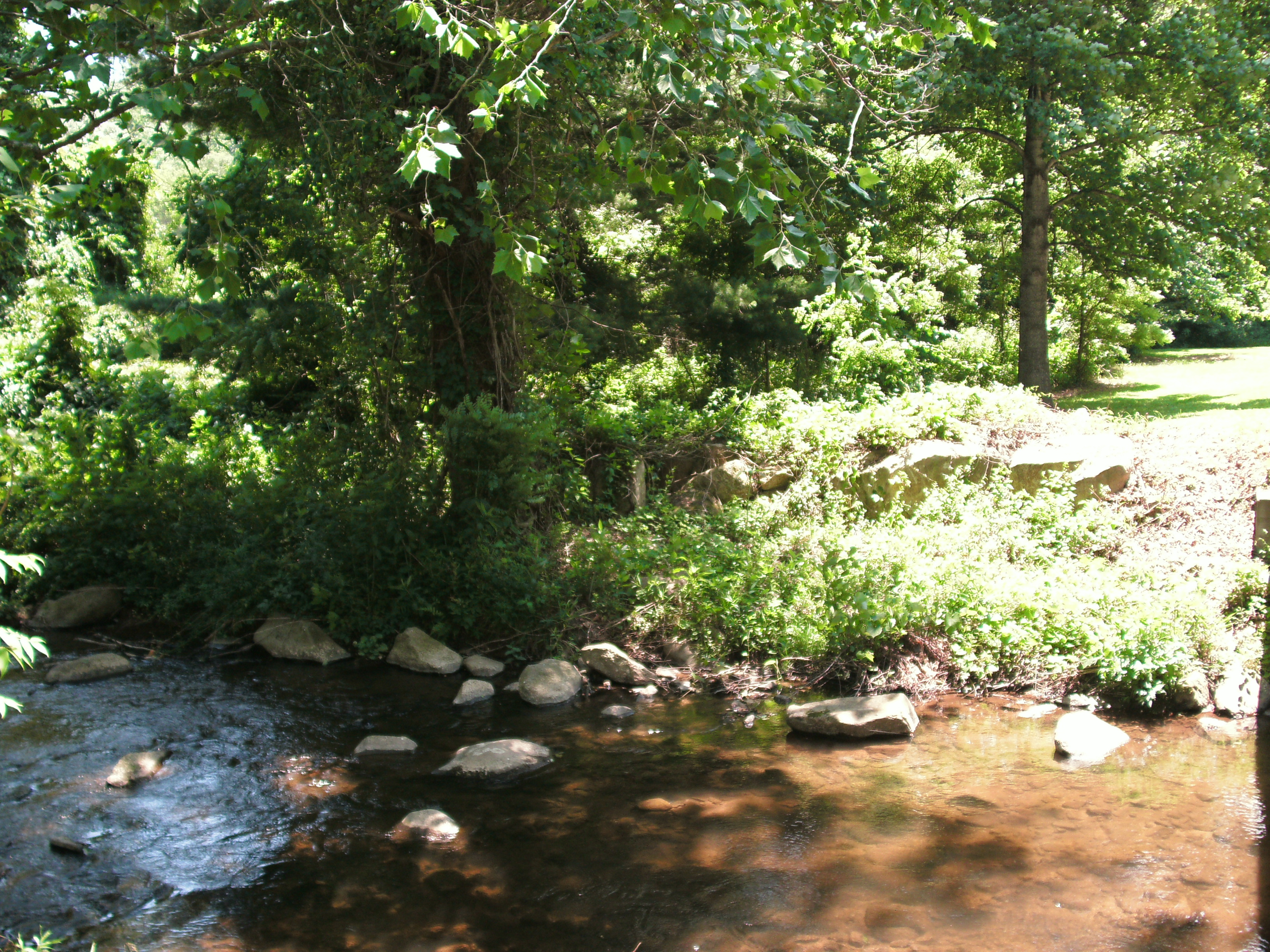
Bank of the river, near Sperryville

The Thornton River is a 27.9-mile-long (44.9 km) river in the U.S. state of Virginia. It rises at Thornton Gap in Shenandoah National Park and flows east through Rappahannock County, running parallel to U.S. Route 211 until it reaches the town of Sperryville. Continuing east into Culpeper County, the Thornton River joins the Hazel River, a tributary of the Rappahannock River, and thus part of the Chesapeake Bay watershed.

Fletcher's Mill was a historic mill on the river, at 38.64722°N 78.20641°W at Fletcher Mill, Virginia.

== See also ==
- List of rivers in Virginia
