= Waterloo station (disambiguation) =

London Waterloo station is a central London terminus on the National Rail network in the UK.

Waterloo station may also refer to:

== Railway stations ==
=== United Kingdom ===
- Aberdeen Waterloo railway station, a former station in Aberdeen, Scotland
- Waterloo Halt railway station, a former station in Rudry, Caerphilly, Wales
- Waterloo International railway station, a former Eurostar terminal in London, England
- Waterloo railway station (Merseyside), in England
- Waterloo tube station, a London Underground station below the mainline station

=== Elsewhere ===
- Waterloo metro station (Charleroi), a light rail station in Charleroi, Hainaut, Belgium
- Waterloo railway station, Belgium, in Waterloo, Walloon Brabant, Belgium
- Waterloo (Hanover Stadtbahn station), in Lower Saxony, Germany
- Waterloo railway station, Lower Hutt, in Greater Wellington, New Zealand
- Waterloo metro station, Sydney, a rapid transit station in New South Wales, Australia
- Waterloo station (Indiana), in the United States
- Yau Ma Tei station, a rapid transit station, formerly named Waterloo station, in Kowloon, Hong Kong

== Other uses ==
- Waterloo Station (TV series), an Australian television series

== See also ==
- Waterloo (disambiguation)
- Waterloo & City line, a London Underground shuttle line between Waterloo and Bank
  - Waterloo Underground Depot
- Waterloo and Whitehall Railway
