= Waterloo High School =

Waterloo High School may refer to:

- Waterloo High School (Alabama), Waterloo, Alabama, US
- Waterloo High School (Illinois), Waterloo, Illinois, US
- Waterloo High School (New York), Waterloo, New York, US
- Waterloo High School (Ohio), Atwater, Ohio, US
- Waterloo High School (Wisconsin), Waterloo, Wisconsin, US
- Waterloo East High School, Waterloo, Iowa, US
- Waterloo West High School, Waterloo, Iowa, US
