= Waterloo Bridge (disambiguation) =

Waterloo Bridge is a road and foot traffic bridge crossing the River Thames in London.

Waterloo Bridge may also refer to:

- Waterloo Bridge, Betws-y-Coed, a bridge over the River Conwy in Wales
- Waterloo Bridge (play), by Robert E. Sherwood, 1930
  - Waterloo Bridge (1931 film), based on the play, starring Mae Clarke
  - Waterloo Bridge (1940 film), based on the play, starring Vivien Leigh and Robert Taylor
  - Gaby (film), a 1956 film based on the play
- Waterloo Bridge (Constable), an 1820 painting by John Constable
- The Opening of Waterloo Bridge, an 1832 painting by John Constable
- Waterloo Bridge (Monet series), a series of paintings of Waterloo Bridge, London, by Claude Monet

== See also ==
- Waterloo (disambiguation)
- Waterloo Bridge Helmet, a pre-Roman Celtic bronze ceremonial horned helmet
- First Battle of Rappahannock Station, also known as Waterloo Bridge, an American Civil War battle
