= Rediviva, Virginia =

Unincorporated community in Virginia, US

Coordinates: 38°41′05″N 78°12′07″W

Rediviva is an unincorporated community in Rappahannock County, in the U.S. state of Virginia.
