= Battle of Waterloo (song) =

Song
- Published: 186?
- Songwriter(s): G. Anderson

Battle of Waterloo is a piece for piano written by G. Anderson in the 1860s and dedicated to the Duke of Wellington. It was published by National Music Co. The sheet music can be found at the Pritzker Military Museum & Library, as well as the Library of Congress and the University of Maine.
