= Waterloo Airport =

Waterloo Airport may refer to:

- Region of Waterloo International Airport in Waterloo Region, Ontario, Canada (IATA: YKF)
- Waterloo Regional Airport in Waterloo, Iowa, United States (FAA: ALO)
- Walker/Rowe Waterloo Airport in Waterloo, Indiana, United States (FAA: 4C2)

== See also ==
- Waterloo Air Terminal, in London, England 1953–1957
