= Hazel River =

Tributary of the Rappahannock River in Virginia, United States

Coordinates: 38.55135°N 77.84803°W

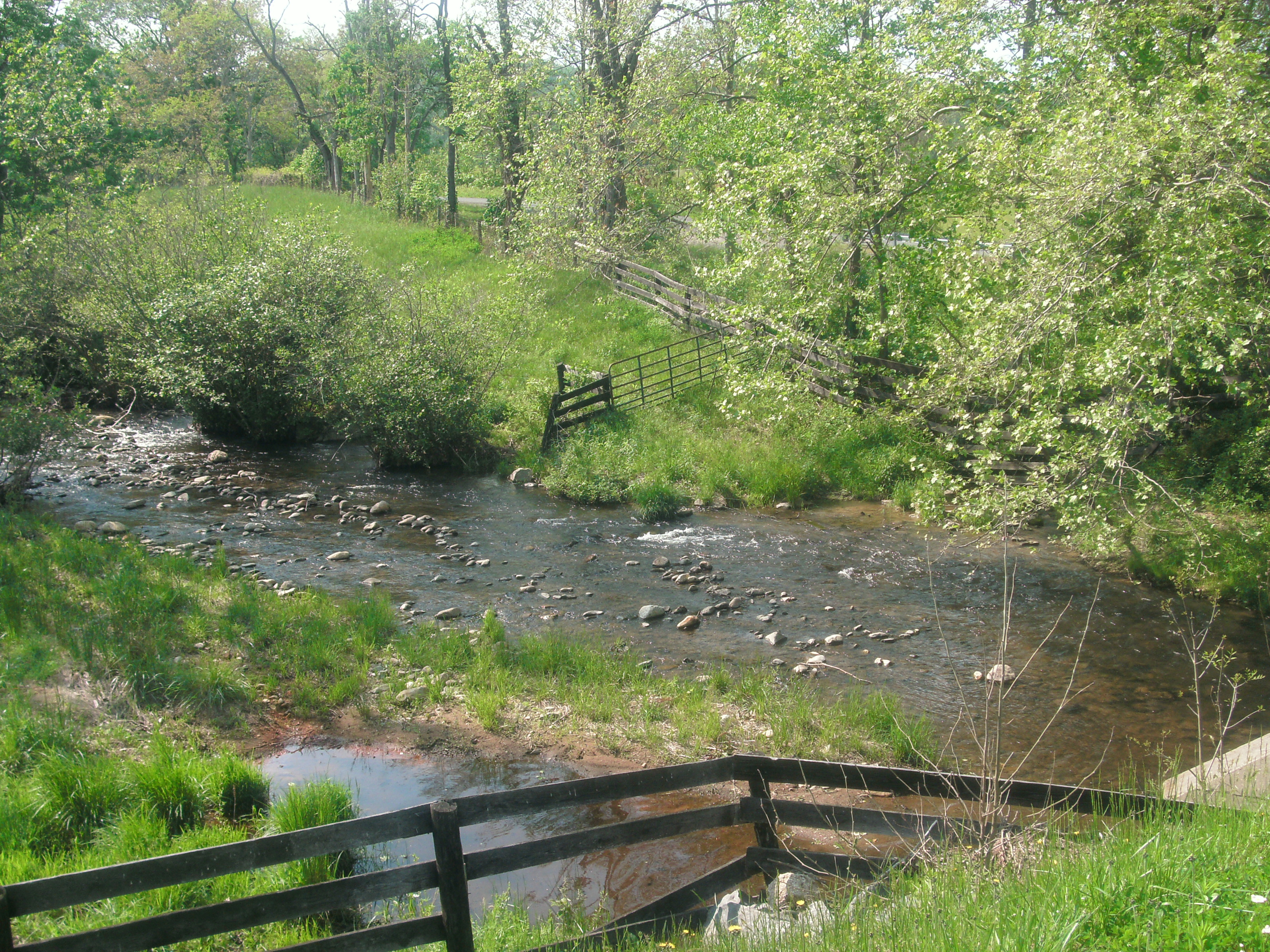
The Hazel River near Sperryville

The Hazel River is a 47.8-mile-long (76.9 km) tributary of the Rappahannock River in northern Virginia in the United States. It is part of the Chesapeake Bay watershed. It rises in Shenandoah National Park and flows generally eastwardly through Rappahannock and Culpeper counties. It joins the Rappahannock River from the west about 3 miles (5 km) northwest of Remington. The Hazel's largest tributaries are the Hughes River, which joins it at the border of Rappahannock and Culpeper counties, and the Thornton River, which joins it in Culpeper County.

== See also ==
- List of Virginia rivers
