= Sperryville Historic District =

Historic district in Virginia, United States

- U.S. National Register of Historic Places
- U.S. Historic district
- Virginia Landmarks Register
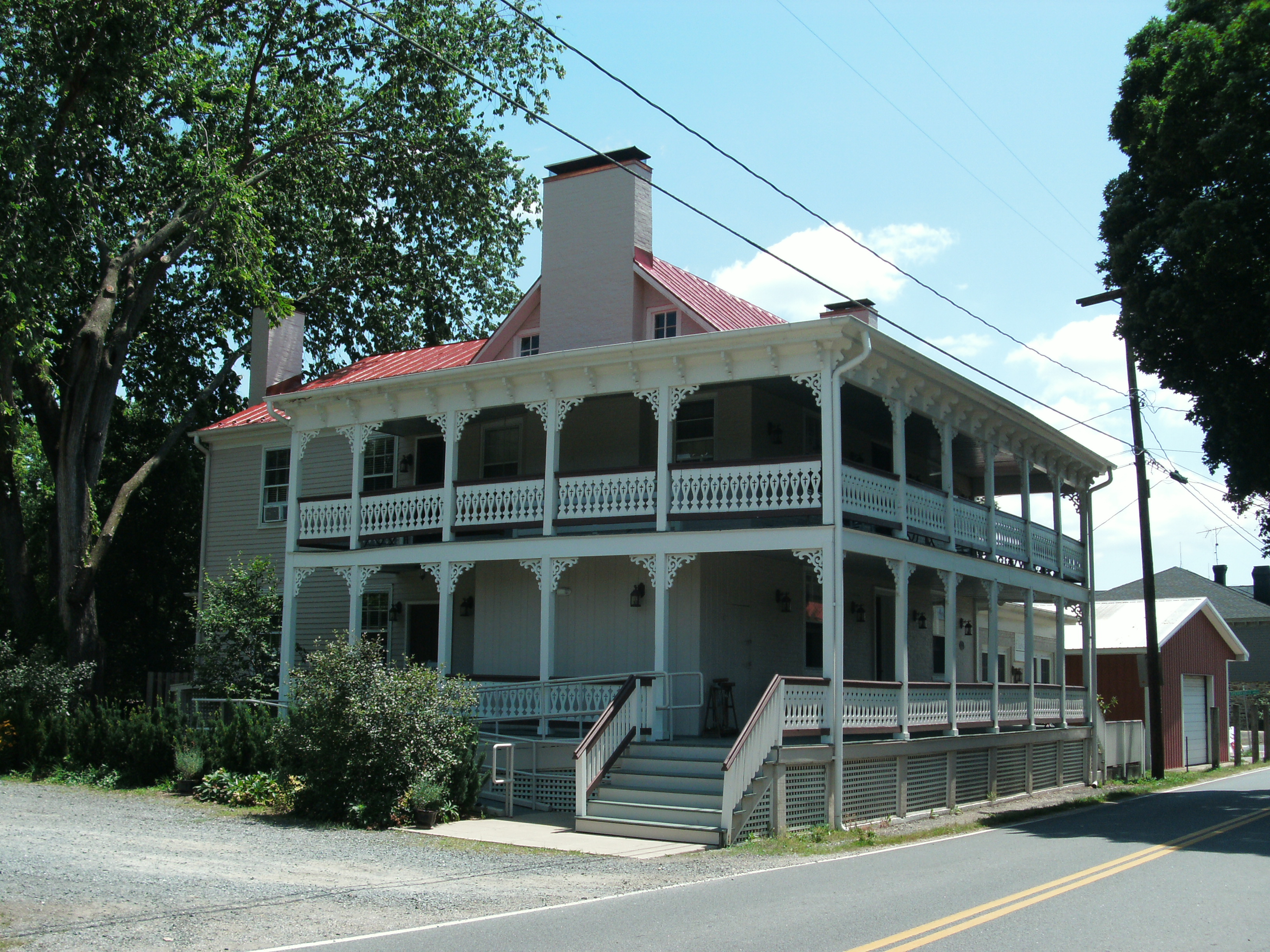
- Hopkins Ordinary in the Sperryville Historic District

- Location within Virginia Location within the United States
- Location: VA 522, 600, 1001, and 1002, Sperryville, Virginia
- Coordinates: 38°39′26″N 78°13′37″W
- Area: 38 acres (15 ha)
- Architectural style: Late 19th And 20th Century Revivals, Federal, Bungalow
- NRHP reference No.: 83003300
- VLR No.: 078-0093

Significant dates
- Added to NRHP: February 10, 1983
- Designated VLR: December 14, 1982

Sperryville Historic District is a national historic district located at Sperryville, Rappahannock County, Virginia, USA. It encompasses 63 contributing buildings in the village of Sperryville. The buildings are predominantly wood-frame, one-and two-story residences, some of which have been converted to commercial establishments. They include a collection of former factory workers' housing built to serve the workers of the Smoot tannery from 1867 to the early 20th century. A number of the buildings were constructed after 1850 with ornamentation and board-and-batten siding that is suggestive of the mid-century Romantic Revivals.

Notable buildings include the George William Cooper House, the Dr. Amiss House, the Hopkins Ordinary, and the Totten's Mill House.

It was added to the National Register of Historic Places in 1983.
