= Waterloo Square =

Waterloo Square may refer to:

- Waterlooplein in Amsterdam
- Waterloo Square in Batavia, Dutch East Indies, now Lapangan Banteng in Sawah Besar
- Waterloo Square in Waterloo, Ontario, Canada
- Waterloo Square in Hanover, Germany
