= Intersections, Virginia =

Unincorporated community in Virginia, US

Coordinates: 38°38′01″N 78°34′49″W

Intersections is an unincorporated community in Page County, in the U.S. state of Virginia.
