= Waterloo Creek =

Waterloo Creek may refer to:

- Waterloo Creek, New South Wales, Australia, the site of the Waterloo Creek massacre in 1837–1838
- Waterloo Creek (Upper Iowa River tributary), in the United States
- Waterloo Creek, a fictional town in Australian children's television series Elly & Jools
