= Waterloo Campaign (video game) =

- Developers: Design, Inc
- Platform: Macintosh

Waterloo Campaign is a video game from Design, Inc. It is based on the Napoleon's 1815 Waterloo campaign.

== Gameplay ==
Waterloo Campaign uses the Musket Fire game engine and focuses on the battles of Quatre Bras, Ligny, Wavre and Waterloo. Waterloo Campaign is battalion-based and units represent roughly 600 soldiers, squares represent 100 yards, and every turn represents 20 minutes of real time. The player is a general as part of a campaign leading up to the battle of Waterloo.

== Development ==
The game was developed by Design, Inc, a company based in Lodi, Wisconsin. The game used the Musket Fire game engine.

== Reception ==
Reception

Review scores
Publication	Score
Computer Games Magazine	4/5
Inside Mac Games	3.5/5

Computer Games Magazine said "Like their more commercial PC rivals, ...by Design continues to steadily evolve their solid tactical engine. The new campaign aspects work well with Napoleon's final battles and the system screams to be adapted to the multi-day battles of the American Civil War".

Inside Mac Games said "Sure, there are rough spots along the way, but the game plays quickly and has the potential to provide many hours of gaming fun".
