= White House, Page County, Virginia =

Human settlement in Page County, Virginia, United States

Coordinates: 38°38′48″N 78°31′58″W

White House is an unincorporated community in Page County, in the U.S. state of Virginia. The community earned its name from a mid-18th century fort-type house, often used for religious services in that time.
