= Hughes River (Virginia) =

Coordinates: 38.52374°N 78.16972°W

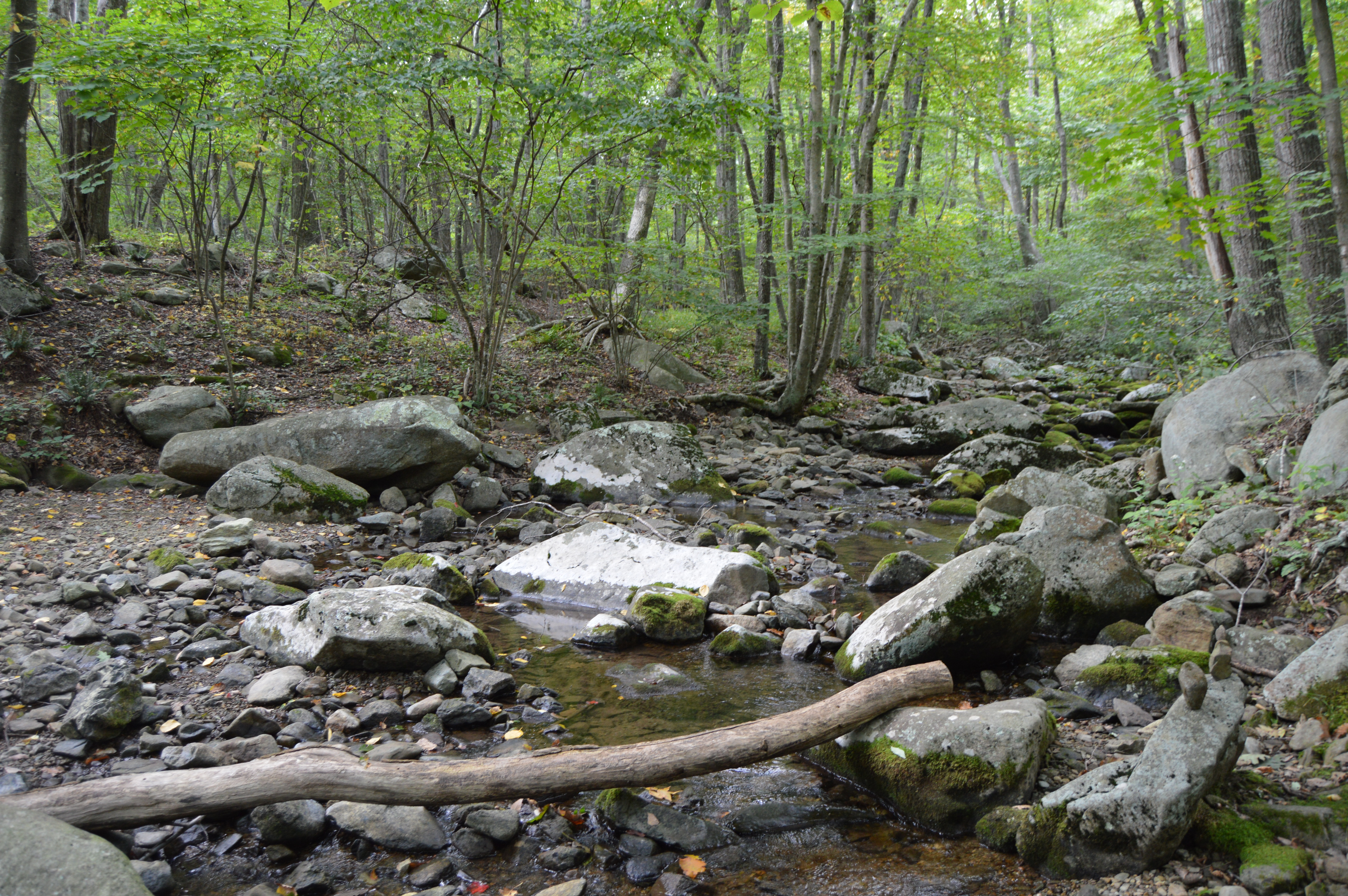
- Headwaters in Madison County

Location
- Country: United States

Physical characteristics
- Source
  - location: Virginia

The Hughes River is a 14.0-mile-long (22.5 km) river in Madison, Rappahannock, and Culpeper counties in the U.S. state of Virginia. The river rises on the east slope of Stony Man mountain in Shenandoah National Park and flows southeast past the village of Nethers to join the Hazel River west of Boston, Virginia. Via the Hazel River and the Rappahannock River, the Hughes River is part of the Chesapeake Bay watershed.

== See also ==
- List of rivers of Virginia
