= Waterloo, Johnson County, Indiana =

- Unincorporated community
- Location within Indiana Location within the United States
- Coordinates: 39°33′45″N 86°11′51″W
- Country: United States
- State: Indiana
- County: Johnson
- Township: White River
- Elevation: 804 ft (245 m)
- ZIP code: 46143
- FIPS code: 18-81325
- GNIS feature ID: 445540

Waterloo is an unincorporated community in White River Township, Johnson County, Indiana.
