= Sperryville, Virginia =

Sperryville
- Census-designated place (CDP)
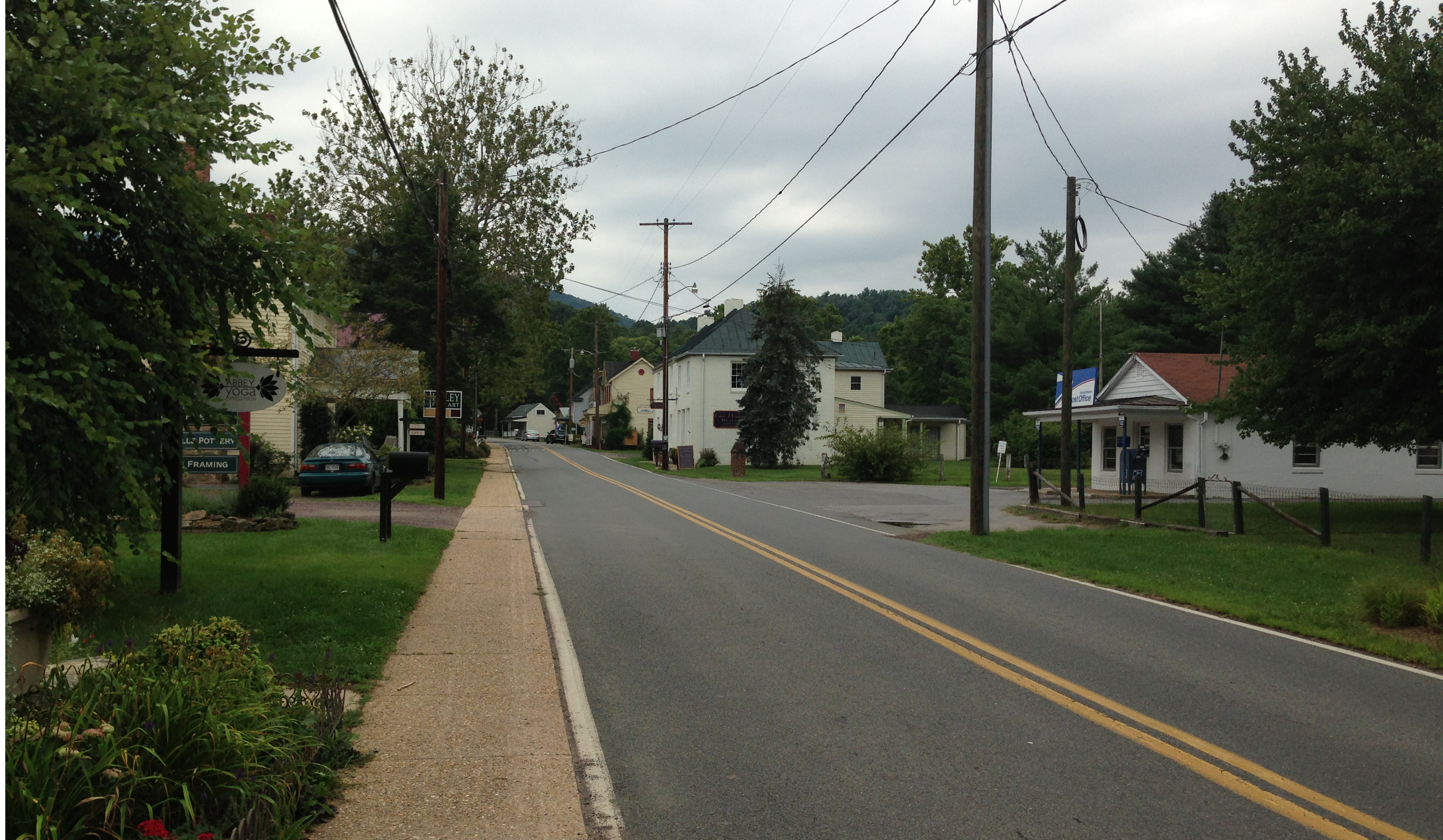
- A view from Sperryville Pike

- Location of the Sperryville CDP within Rappahannock County

- Location within the Commonwealth of Virginia Sperryville (the United States)
- Coordinates: 38°39′25″N 78°13′34″W
- Country: United States
- State: Virginia
- County: Rappahannock
- Elevation: 700 ft (210 m)

Population (2010)
  - Total: 342
- Time zone: UTC−5 (Eastern (EST))
  - Summer (DST): UTC−4 (EDT)
- ZIP codes: 22740
- Area code: 540

Sperryville is a census-designated place (CDP) located in the western section of Rappahannock County, Virginia, United States, near Shenandoah National Park. It consists of a village with two main streets along the two branches of the Thornton River, together with surrounding pasture and farmland. As of the 2020 census, Sperryville had a population of 302.

== Climate ==
Sperryville has a warm temperate hot summer climate (Cfa), where the winters are cool, and summers are hot. The town is situated in USDA Hardiness Zone 7a, where the annual average minimum is 0 °F. It has four seasons: winter, spring, summer and fall. Cool-hardy crops and other plants such as peas and dandelions come about in mid to late March, and they stop growing in mid November.

Climate data for Sperryville, Virginia (1991–2020 normals, extremes 1995–present)
Month	Jan	Feb	Mar	Apr	May	Jun	Jul	Aug	Sep	Oct	Nov	Dec	Year
Record high °F (°C)	80 (27)	83 (28)	88 (31)	94 (34)	96 (36)	100 (38)	104 (40)	101 (38)	99 (37)	92 (33)	84 (29)	81 (27)	104 (40)
Mean daily maximum °F (°C)	43.1 (6.2)	46.9 (8.3)	54.1 (12.3)	65.3 (18.5)	72.9 (22.7)	81.2 (27.3)	85.2 (29.6)	83.8 (28.8)	77.3 (25.2)	67.2 (19.6)	56.9 (13.8)	46.6 (8.1)	65.0 (18.4)
Daily mean °F (°C)	33.7 (0.9)	36.2 (2.3)	42.6 (5.9)	53.2 (11.8)	61.6 (16.4)	70.1 (21.2)	74.4 (23.6)	73.0 (22.8)	66.5 (19.2)	55.6 (13.1)	45.9 (7.7)	37.3 (2.9)	54.2 (12.3)
Mean daily minimum °F (°C)	24.3 (−4.3)	25.5 (−3.6)	31.1 (−0.5)	41.1 (5.1)	50.2 (10.1)	59.0 (15.0)	63.6 (17.6)	62.2 (16.8)	55.7 (13.2)	44.0 (6.7)	35.0 (1.7)	28.1 (−2.2)	43.3 (6.3)
Record low °F (°C)	−2 (−19)	−8 (−22)	3 (−16)	21 (−6)	29 (−2)	42 (6)	49 (9)	50 (10)	38 (3)	27 (−3)	12 (−11)	4 (−16)	−8 (−22)
Average precipitation inches (mm)	3.61 (92)	2.77 (70)	4.01 (102)	4.01 (102)	4.67 (119)	5.21 (132)	3.67 (93)	4.12 (105)	5.44 (138)	3.68 (93)	3.69 (94)	3.96 (101)	48.84 (1,241)
Average snowfall inches (cm)	6.9 (18)	6.9 (18)	1.9 (4.8)	0.2 (0.51)	0.0 (0.0)	0.0 (0.0)	0.0 (0.0)	0.0 (0.0)	0.0 (0.0)	trace	0.3 (0.76)	4.8 (12)	21.0 (53)
Average precipitation days (≥ 0.01 in)	10.4	9.1	10.5	12.1	14.5	11.9	11.0	11.0	10.1	8.9	8.1	10.4	128.0
Average snowy days (≥ 0.1 in)	3.2	3.4	1.7	0.1	0.0	0.0	0.0	0.0	0.0	0.1	0.4	2.3	11.2
Source: NOAA

== History ==
The land on which Sperryville is located is part of 3,000 acres granted by King George II of Great Britain to Francis Thornton in 1731. This land was regranted to Thornton in 1751 by Thomas Fairfax, 6th Lord Fairfax of Cameron, owner of the Northern Neck Proprietary, after Fairfax won his suit to prevent the king from granting land in the Proprietary. Part of this land was inherited by a descendant, also named Francis Thornton, in 1817. He was a soldier in the War of 1812, became a Presbyterian minister, and was sent from his home in Fredericksburg, Virginia, to organize a Presbyterian church in what was then western Culpeper County. In 1820 he began selling small lots of land along the main road (currently Main Street, VA Route 1001). The first deed was for a ½-acre lot “in a little town laid off by me, the said Francis Thornton Jr., and surveyed by Johnston Menefee ... the village is in a flat adjoining the lands of John Menefee between the Pass Mill (today’s Fletcher’s Mill) and Thornton’s Gap”. The village of Sperryville is named on an 1821 map of Culpeper County created by John Wood.

On one of the lots, John Hopkins established an ‘ordinary’ that later became a boarding house for immigrant Irish laborers. On another lot was a tavern and stage coach office to serve people traveling from Culpeper Court House to New Market, Virginia. On other lots were a cobbler’s shop, stores, and individual homes. In the early 1800s John Kiger built Conestoga wagons in the area. The post office was established in the village in 1840. In the 1850s several turnpikes were constructed that accessed Sperryville: Thornton’s Gap from Culpeper to Sperryville, Newmarket & Sperryville, and Sperryville-Rappahannock from Sperryville east to the Rappahannock River. A tannery and worker’s homes were constructed in the late 1860s by the Smoot family. Four churches were established in the area by 1880, as well as a woolen mill, seven distillers, two hotels, four general stores, and one saloon. There were also ten corn and flour mills nearby. An apple processing facility was built in 1918 to serve the many local apple orchardists. Sperryville high school was constructed adjacent to the town. In the 1930s, a Civilian Conservation Corps camp located at Beech Spring west of the village provided farmers with a nearby market for produce, meat, milk, and eggs to feed the corpsmen housed there. The Sperryville apple packing and juice plant was created on the site of the former Smoot tannery.

The Sperryville Historic District was listed on the Virginia Landmarks Registry in 1982 and on the National Register of Historic Places in 1983.

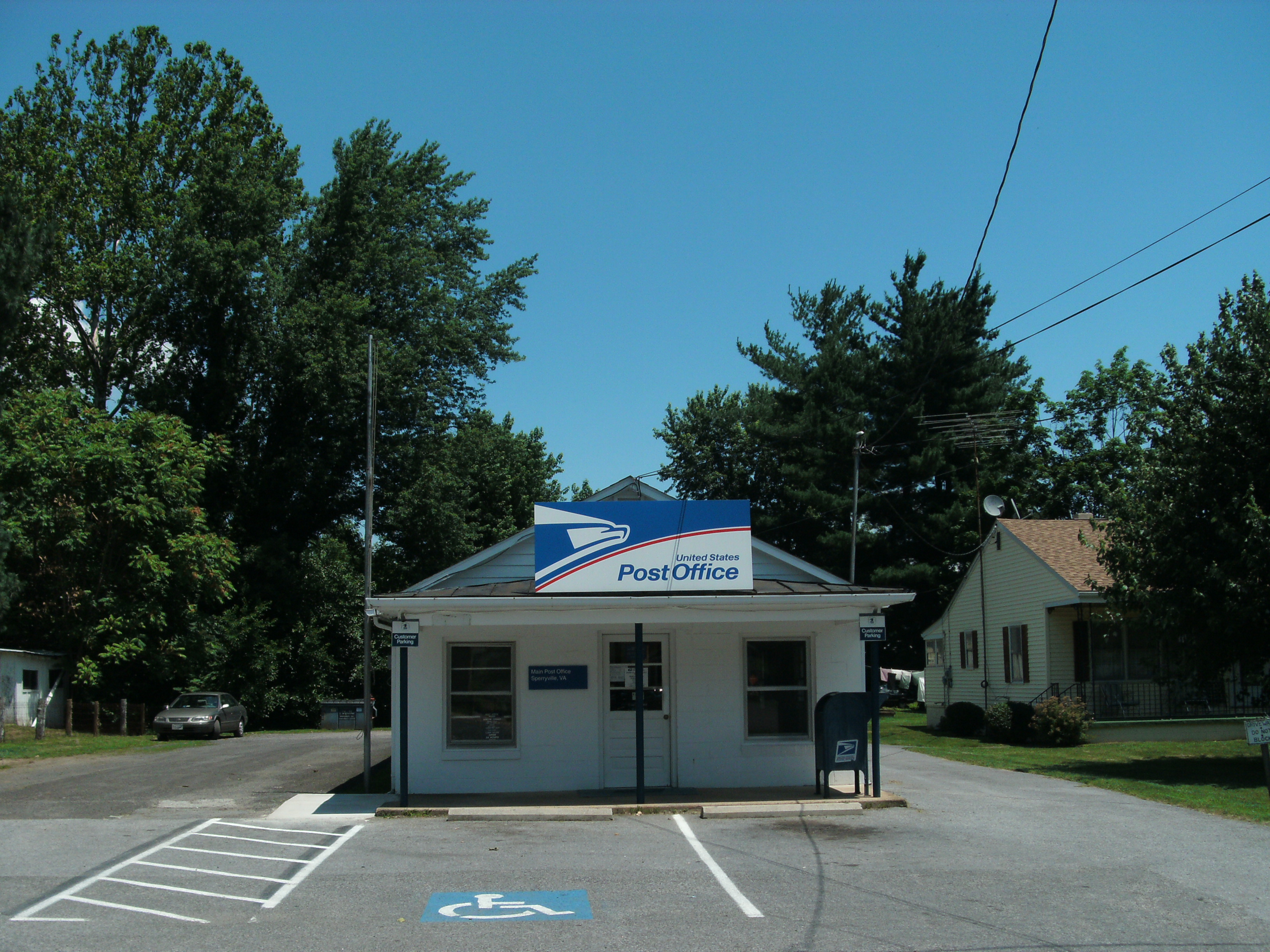
US Post office in Sperryville

== Demographics ==
Historical population
Census	Pop.	Note	%±
2010	342		—
2020	302		−11.7%
U.S. Decennial Census; 2010 2020

Sperryville was first listed as a census designated place in the 2010 U.S. census.

== Attractions ==
Sperryville continued as a small rural town with modest amenities until the opening of Skyline Drive in the late 1930s. The area became saturated with gasoline stations, roadside businesses, lunch rooms, restaurants, and motels. Modern Sperryville continues to cater to tourists and locals alike, but has reinvented itself with chic restaurants, bars, artisan shops, artist studios, bed and breakfast accommodations, and antique stores. The village and its environs also have wineries, a brewery, a distillery, and a 9-hole golf course. Roadside stands have given way to family farm and community-supported agricultural markets. Many homes and the schoolhouse have been repurposed into commercial ventures. The annual Sperryfest celebrates the vibrant community.

The village is located at the foothills of the Blue Ridge mountains and, via U.S. Route 211, provides access to the Thornton Gap entrance of Shenandoah National Park and Skyline Drive. Popular nearby hiking trails in the Park include the Buck Hollow/Buck Ridge trail, Thornton River trail, White Oak Canyon, and Old Rag Mountain.

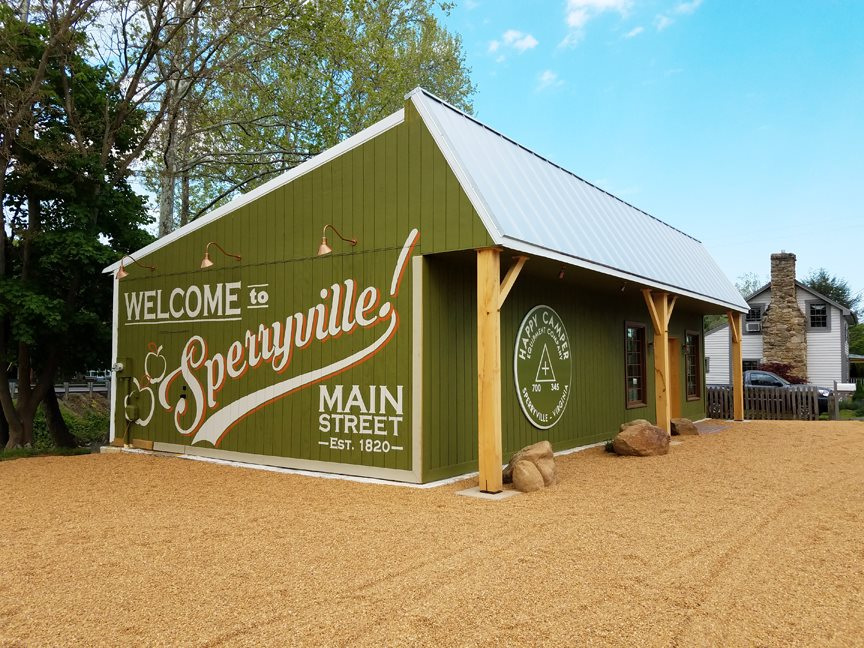
Welcome to Sperryville mural painted at Happy Camper Equipment Co. in 2018

In 2018, Happy Camper Equipment Co., situated at one entrance to historic Main Street, painted a mural reading "Welcome to Sperryville" on a side of the building that has become a point of pride in the community and a local attraction.

Sperryville is the setting for parts of the 8th Jack Reacher novel, The Enemy, by Lee Child.
