= Waterloo, Clarke County, Virginia =

Unincorporated community in Virginia, United States

Waterloo, Virginia
- Unincorporated community
- Location within the Commonwealth of Virginia Waterloo (Virginia) Waterloo (the United States)
- Coordinates: 39°4′58″N 78°4′59″W
- Country: United States
- State: Virginia
- County: Clarke
- Time zone: UTC−5 (Eastern (EST))
  - Summer (DST): UTC−4 (EDT)

Waterloo is an unincorporated community in Clarke County in the U.S. state of Virginia. Waterloo is located at the crossroads of John Mosby Highway (U.S. Route 17/U.S. Route 50) and Lord Fairfax Highway (U.S. Route 340). County historians attribute the name to the regular severe accidents at the intersection, where people were said to have "met their Waterloo," referring to the site of Napoleon's final defeat.
