= Waterloo Downtown Historic District (Waterloo, Wisconsin) =

Historic district in Wisconsin, United States

- U.S. National Register of Historic Places
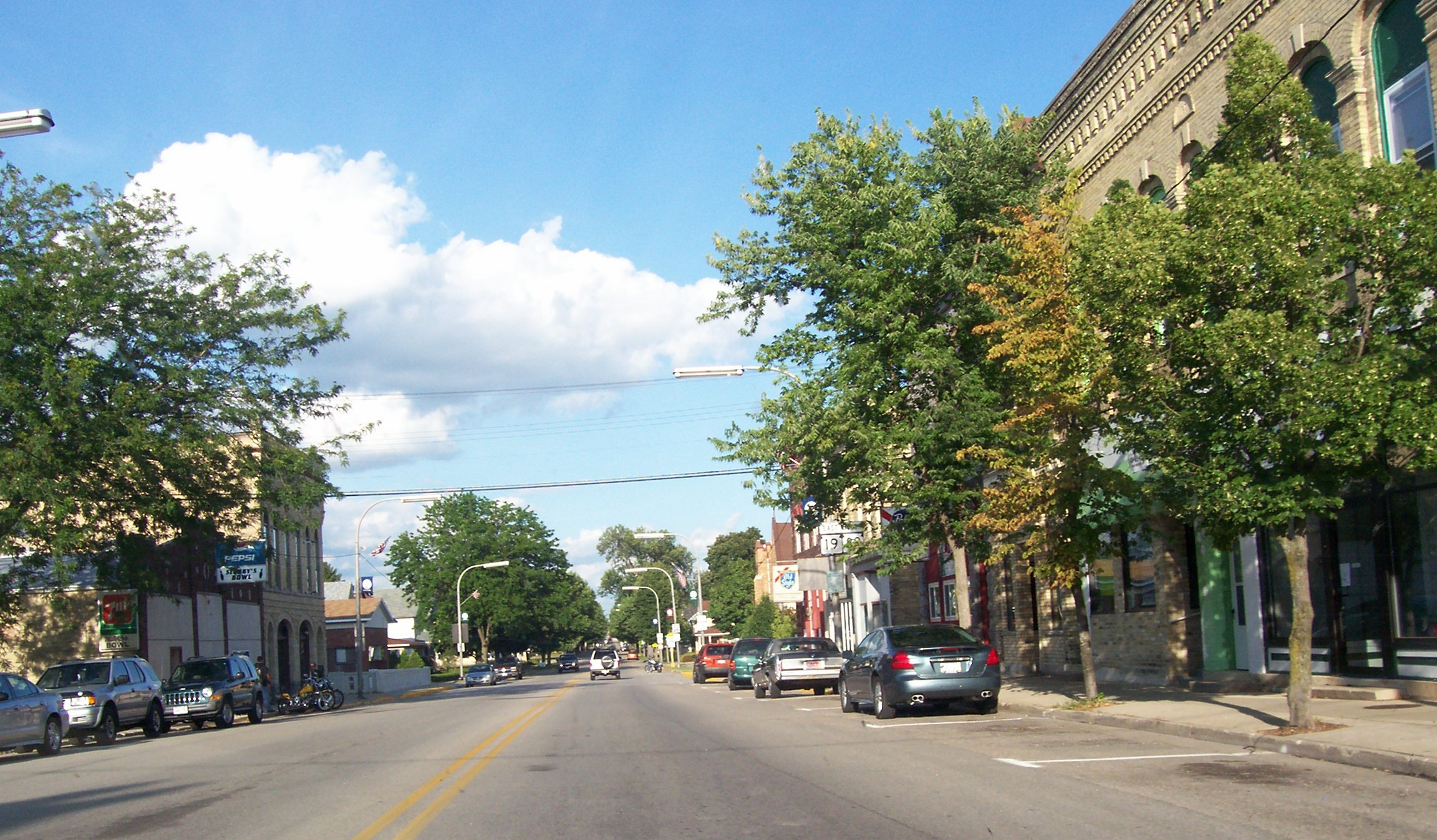
- A portion of the district.
- Location: Jct. of Madison and Monroe Sts., Waterloo, Wisconsin
- Coordinates: 43°11′02″N 88°59′25″W
- Area: 5.2 acres (2.1 ha)
- NRHP reference No.: 00001360
- Added to NRHP: November 8, 2000

The Waterloo Downtown Historic District in Waterloo, Wisconsin is a 5.2 acres (2.1 ha) historic district which was listed on the National Register of Historic Places in 2000.

== Description ==
The district is made up of the old downtown of Waterloo, including the 1874 Italianate-styled Muebus & Fiebeger's Double Block, the 1885 Brandner dry goods store, the 1893 Queen Anne-styled Doering Block, the 1896 Becken's Saloon, the 1897 Failinger general store, the 1923 Neoclassical Community Hall, the 1924 Colonial Revival-ish Stoke Brothers Auto Filling Station, and the 1938 Arte Moderne Mode Theater.
