= Waterloo, New Kent County, Virginia =

Unincorporated community in Virginia, US

Coordinates: 37°35′45″N 77°10′4″W

Waterloo is an unincorporated community in New Kent County, Virginia, United States.
