= Waterloo, Wisconsin =

- City
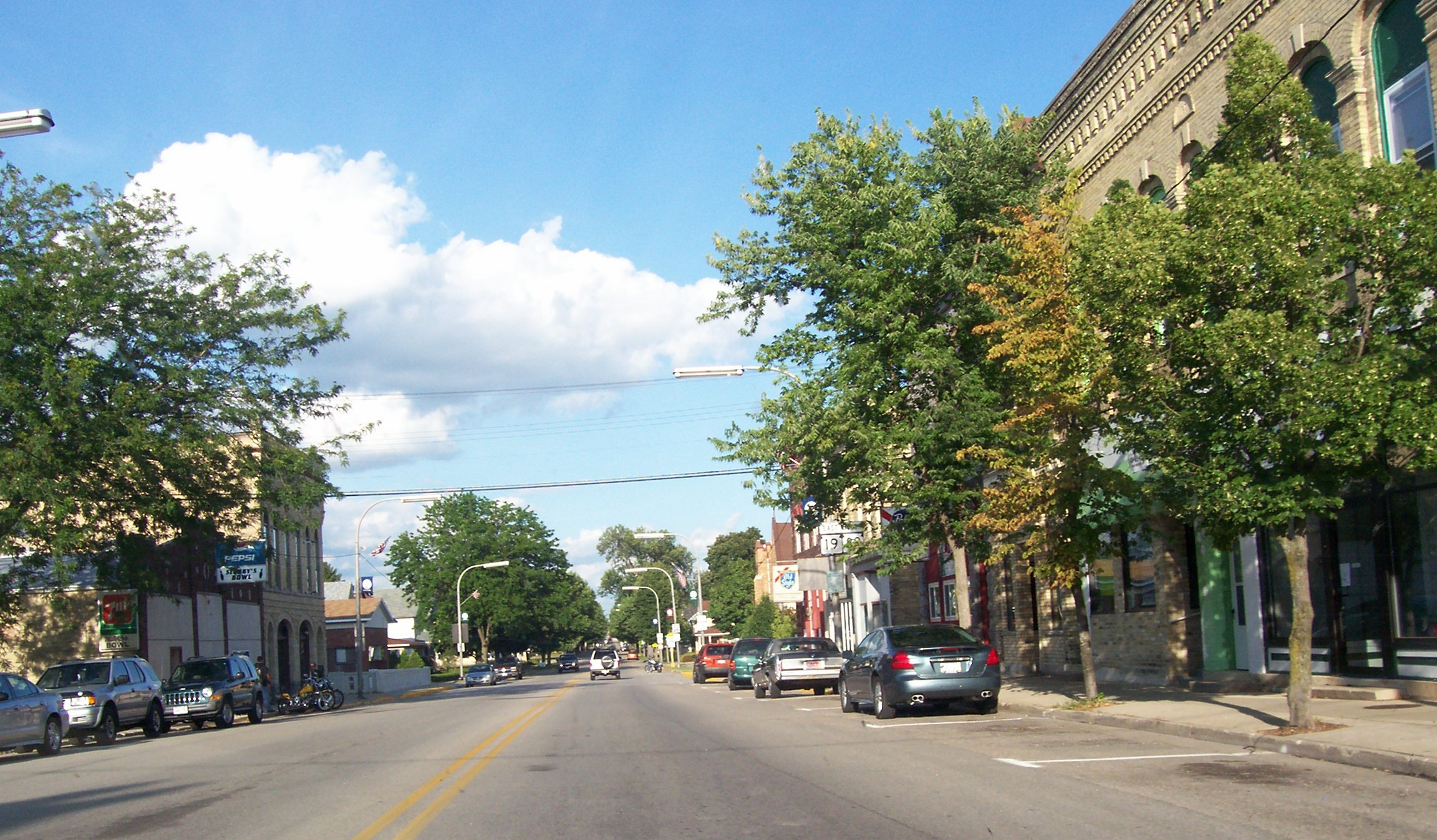
- Downtown Waterloo on Highways 89/19, part of the Waterloo Downtown Historic District.
- Motto: "Find Your Path Here"
- Location of Waterloo in Jefferson County, Wisconsin.

- Location within Wisconsin Location within the United States
- Coordinates: 43°11′1″N 88°59′24″W
- Country: United States
- State: Wisconsin
- County: Jefferson

Government
  - Type: Mayor–council
  - Mayor: Jennifer Quimby

Area
  - Total: 3.87 sq mi (10.02 km^{2})
  - Land: 3.80 sq mi (9.83 km^{2})
  - Water: 0.073 sq mi (0.19 km^{2})
- Elevation: 810 ft (250 m)

Population (2020)
  - Total: 3,492
  - Estimate (2021): 3,479
  - Density: 878.4/sq mi (339.17/km^{2})
- Time zone: UTC-6 (Central (CST))
  - Summer (DST): UTC-5 (CDT)
- ZIP Code: 53594
- Area code: 920
- FIPS code: 55-83925
- GNIS feature ID: 1576289
- Website: www.waterloowi.us

Waterloo is a city in Jefferson County, Wisconsin, United States. The population was 3,628 at the 2020 census. The name Waterloo was suggested by a French resident who was one of Napoleon's soldiers at the Battle of Waterloo. Waterloo is located in the Watertown–Fort Atkinson micropolitan area. The city is the home of Trek Bicycle Corporation.

== Geography ==
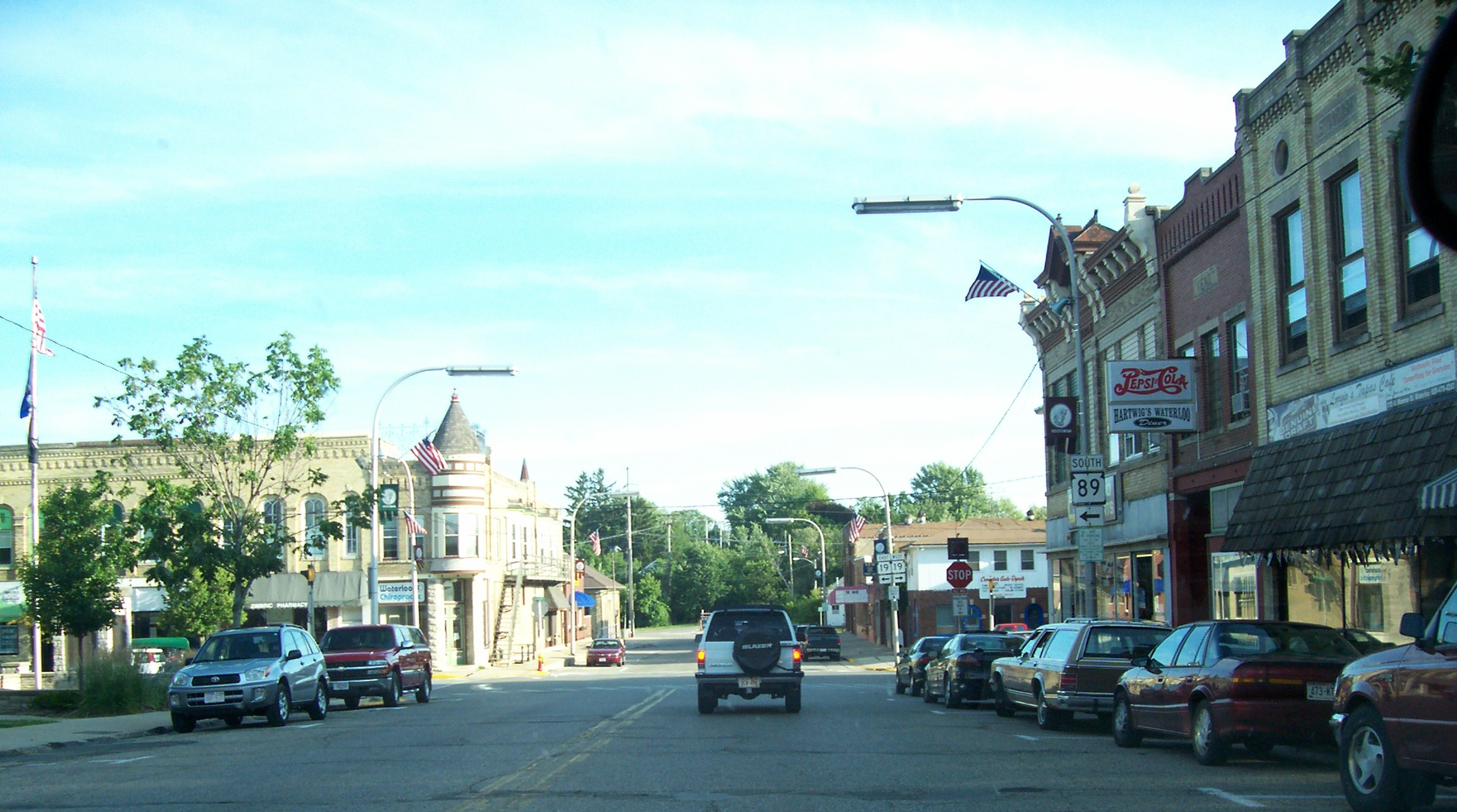
Downtown Waterloo on Highway 89

Waterloo is located at 43°11′1″N 88°59′23″W (43.18366, -88.989965) at the intersection of Wisconsin Highway 89 and Wisconsin Highway 19 in northwestern Jefferson County.

According to the United States Census Bureau, the city has a total area of 3.91 square miles (10.13 km^{2}), of which 3.83 square miles (9.92 km^{2}) is land and 0.08 square miles (0.21 km^{2}) is water.

== Demographics ==
Historical population
Census	Pop.	Note	%±
1870	727		—
1880	719		−1.1%
1890	862		19.9%
1900	1,137		31.9%
1910	1,220		7.3%
1920	1,262		3.4%
1930	1,272		0.8%
1940	1,474		15.9%
1950	1,667		13.1%
1960	1,947		16.8%
1970	2,253		15.7%
1980	2,393		6.2%
1990	2,712		13.3%
2000	3,259		20.2%
2010	3,333		2.3%
2020	3,492		4.8%
2021 (est.)	3,479		−0.4%
U.S. Decennial Census

As of 2000, the median income for a household in the city was $50,221, and the median income for a family was $56,446. The per capita income for the city was $23,011. About 5.0% of families and 4.8% of the population were below the poverty line, including 5.8% of those under age 18 and 7.1% of those age 65 or over.

=== 2010 census ===
As of the census of 2010, there were 3,333 people, 1,331 households, and 867 families residing in the city. The population density was 854.6 people per square mile (330/km^{2}). There were 1,409 housing units at an average density of 361.3 per square mile (139.5/km^{2}). The racial makeup of the city was 89.20% White, 0.80% Black or African American, 0.40% Native American, 0.80% Asian, 9.40% from other races, and 1.20% from two or more races. 12.80% of the population were Hispanic or Latino of any race.

There were 1,331 households, of which 32.8% had children under the age of 18 living with them, 51.4% were married couples living together, 9.2% had a female householder with no husband present, and 34.9% were non-families. 29.2% of all households were made up of individuals, and 23.1% had someone living alone who was 65 years of age or older. The average household size was 2.49 and the average family size was 3.09.

In the city, the population was spread out, with 26.1% under the age of 18, 5.6% from 18 to 24, 27.9% from 25 to 44, 26.6% from 45 to 64, and 12.0% who were 65 years of age or older. The median age was 37.5 years. For every 100 females, there were 100 males. For every 100 females age 18 and over, there were 95.7 males.

== Economy ==
The city is the headquarters for Trek Bicycle Corporation and Van Holten Pickles. Waterloo was formerly the headquarters of Perry Printing, later Perry-Judd.

== Media ==
Waterloo is the home of its own weekly newspaper named The Courier. Waterloo is a part of the Milwaukee television market with Madison-based stations also available over the air and on cable. Waterloo is served by radio stations from the Milwaukee, Madison and Janesville markets.

== Annual events ==
- Wiener and Kraut Day
- Fireman's Park 4 July
- Christmas Holiday Parade

== Notable people ==
- Arnie F. Betts, Wisconsin State Representative
- Tom Hamilton, broadcaster of the Cleveland Guardians
- Daniel L. Hannifin, Wisconsin State Representative
- Everis A. Hayes, congressman from California

== Gallery of images ==
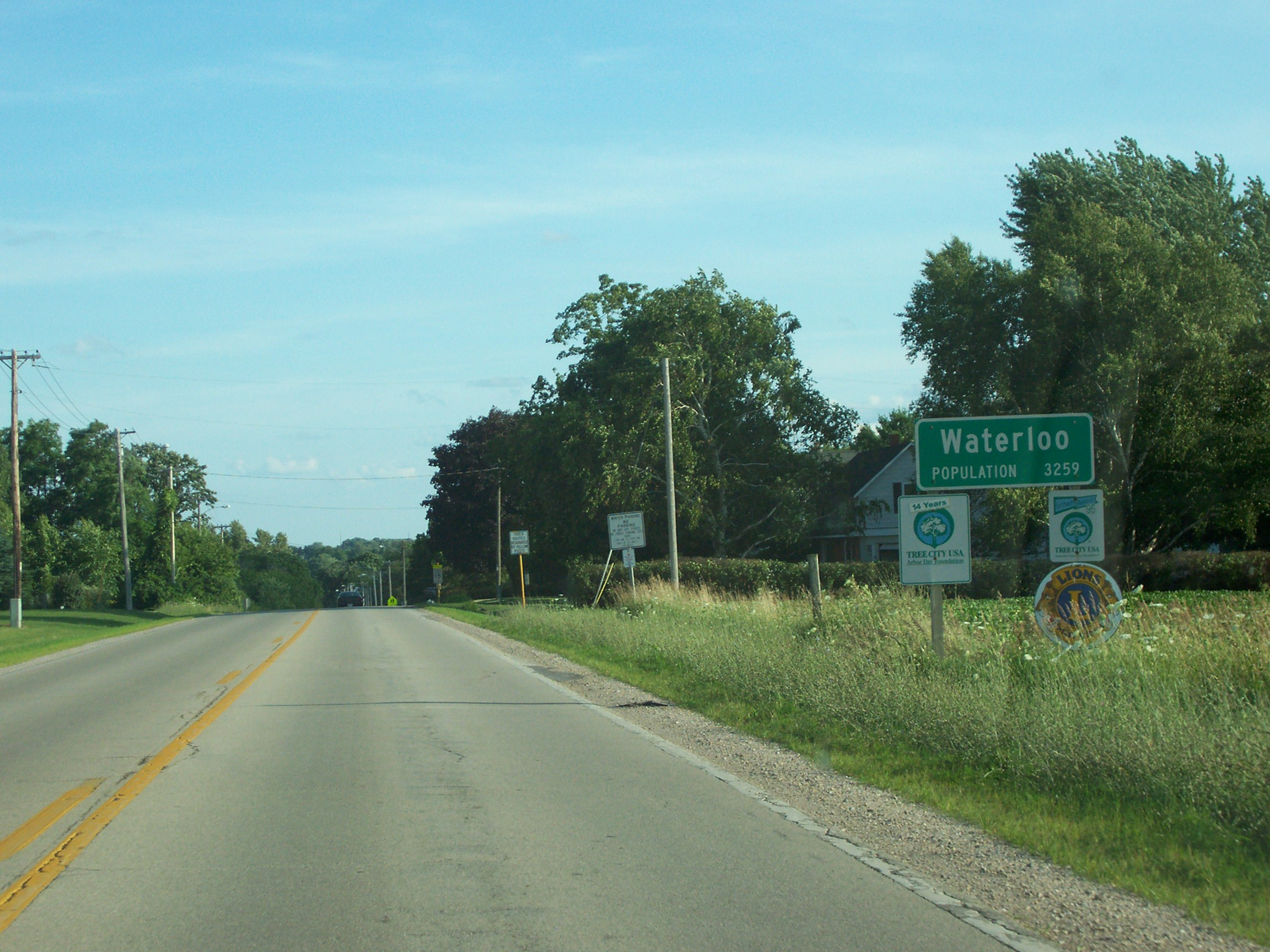
The DOT sign for Waterloo

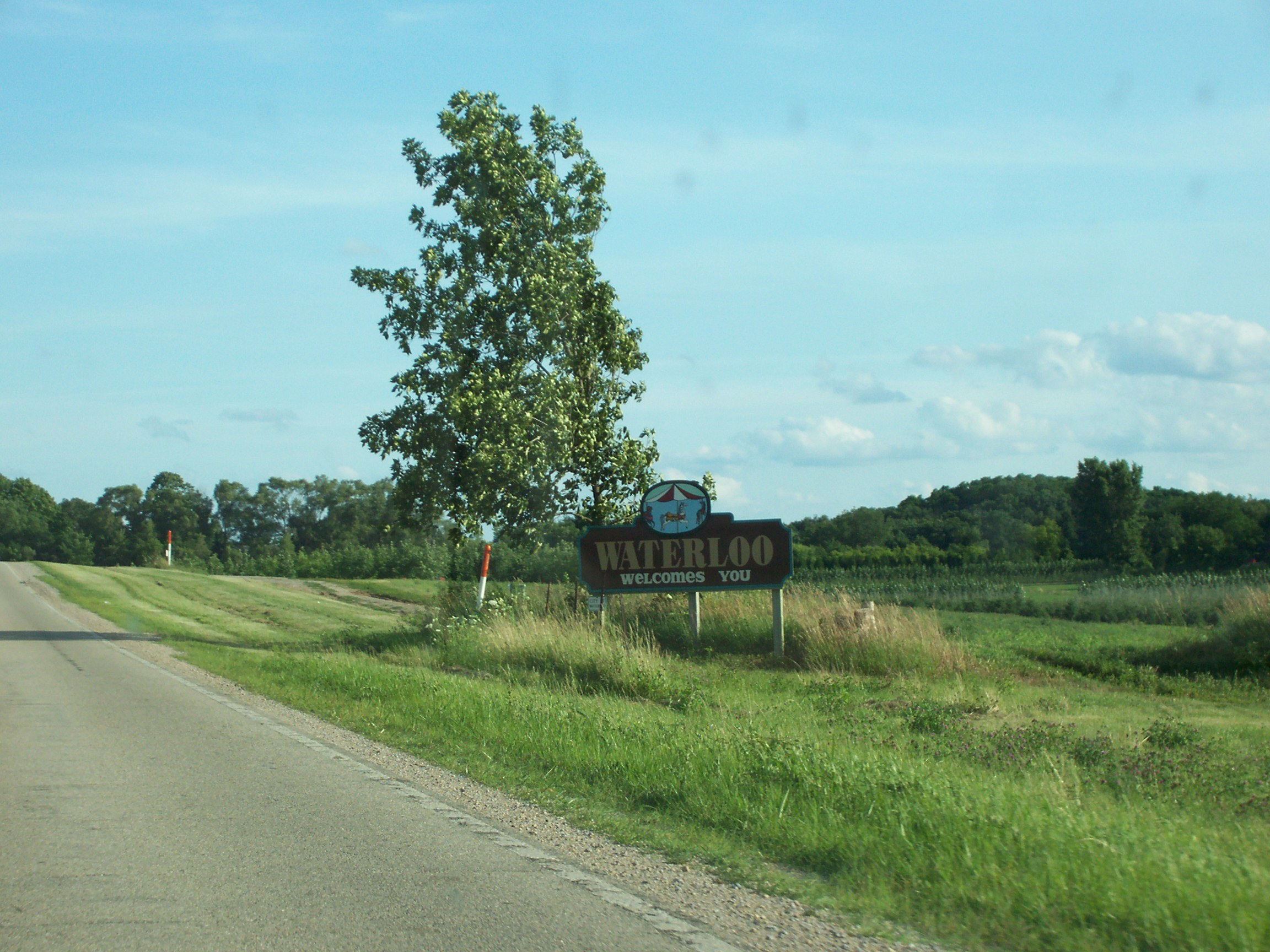
Welcome sign on Wisconsin Highway 89

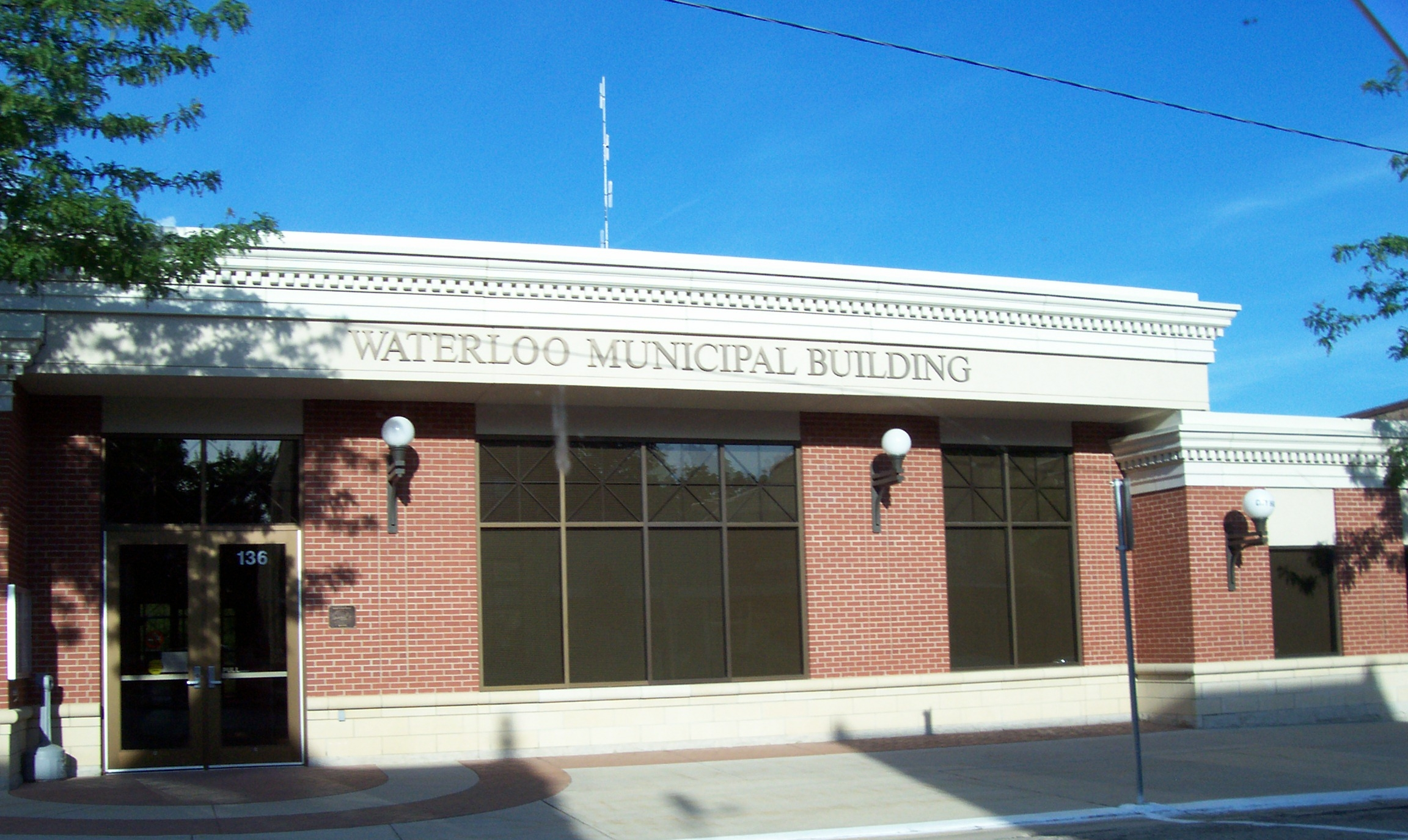
Municipal building

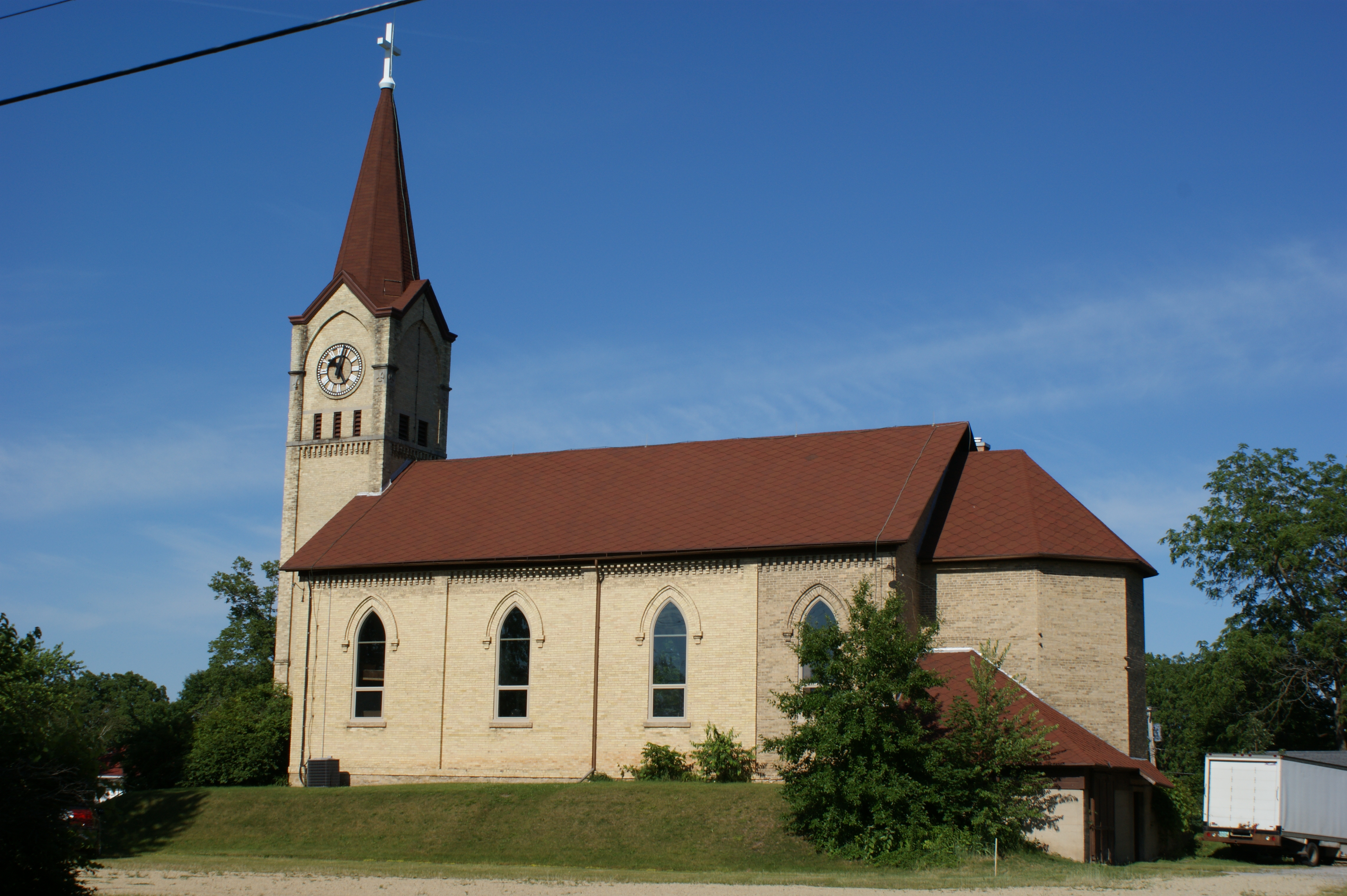
Waterloo-Area Historical Society

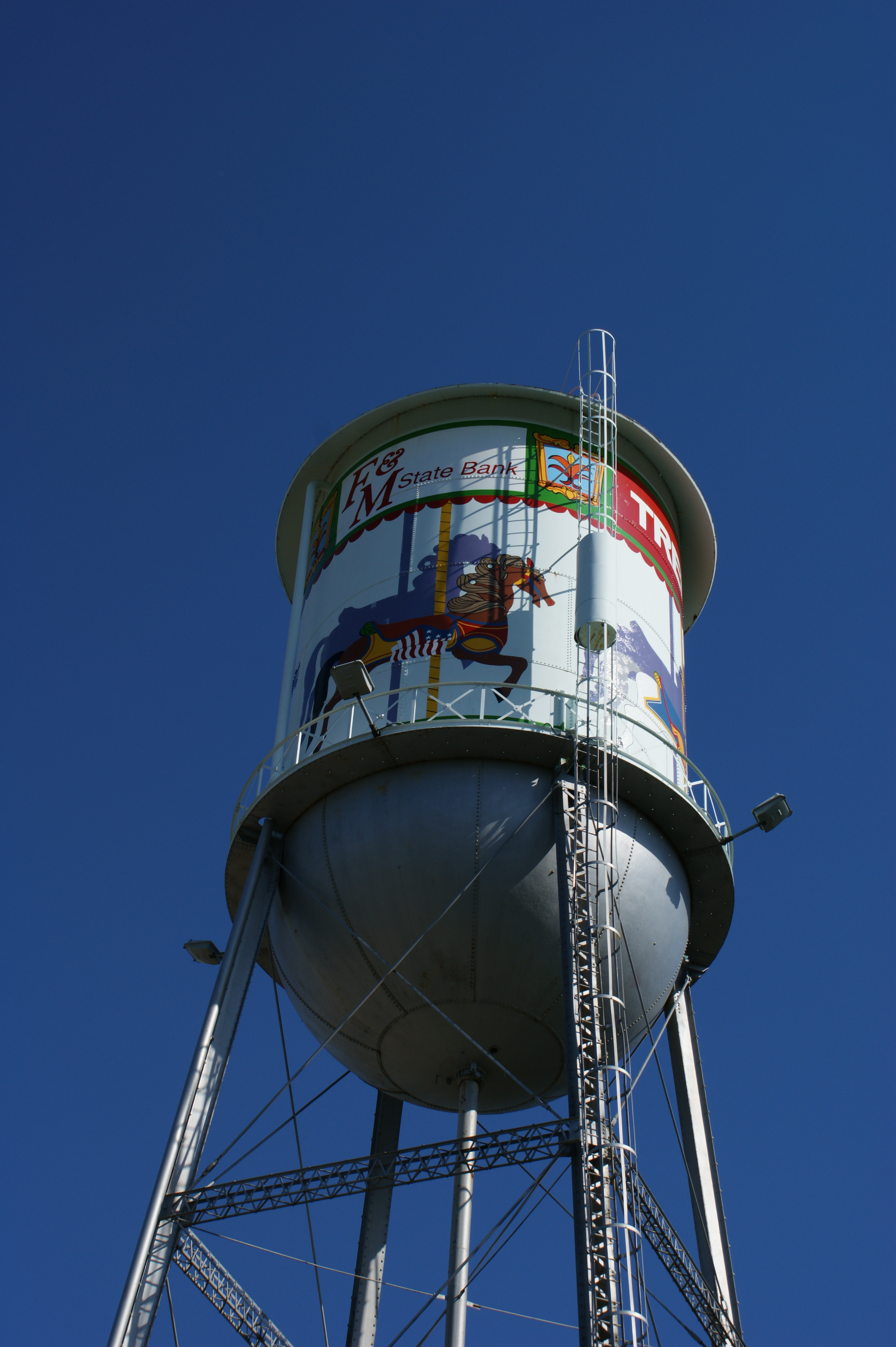
Waterloo Water tower

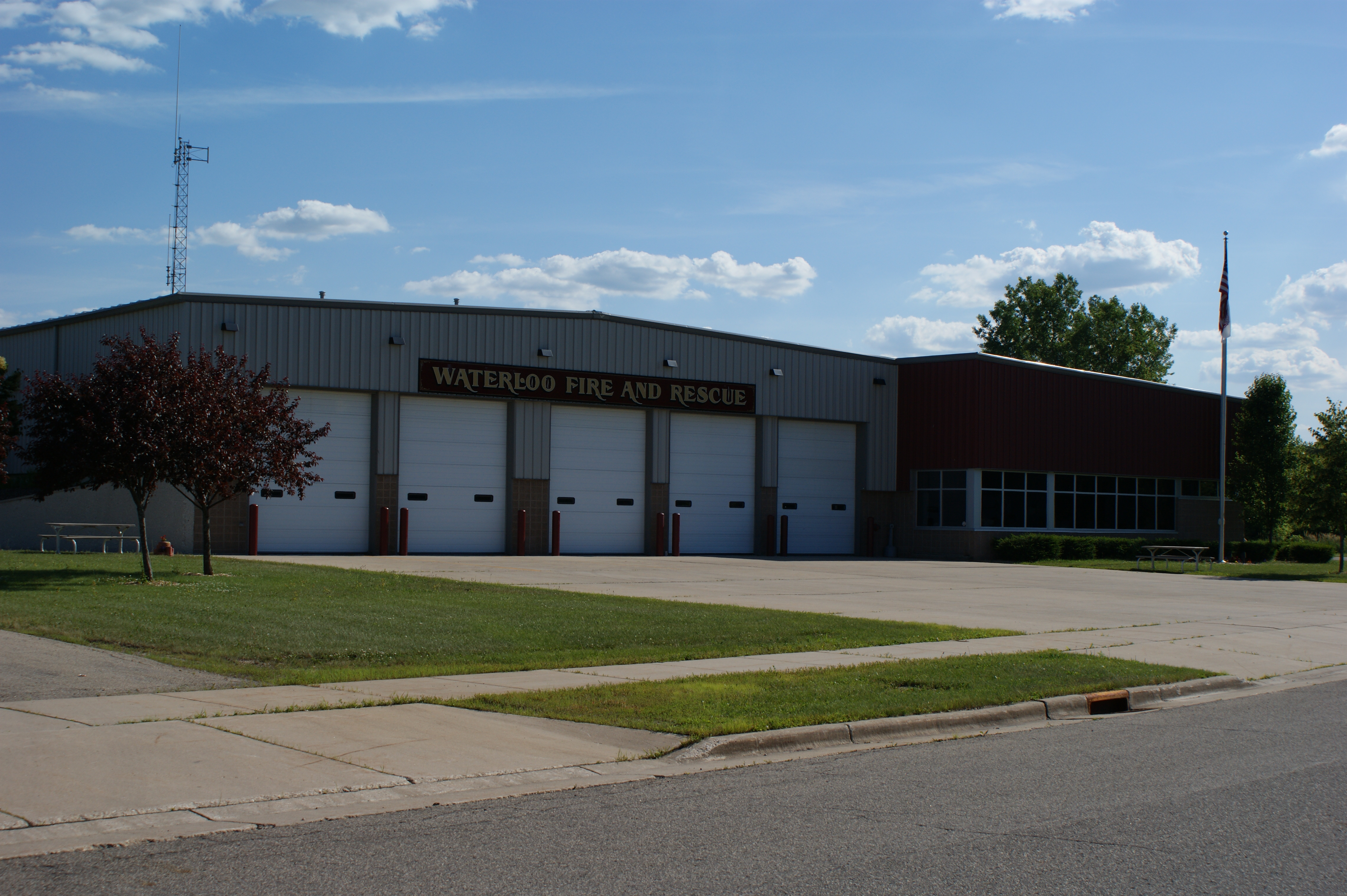
Waterloo Fire and Rescue building

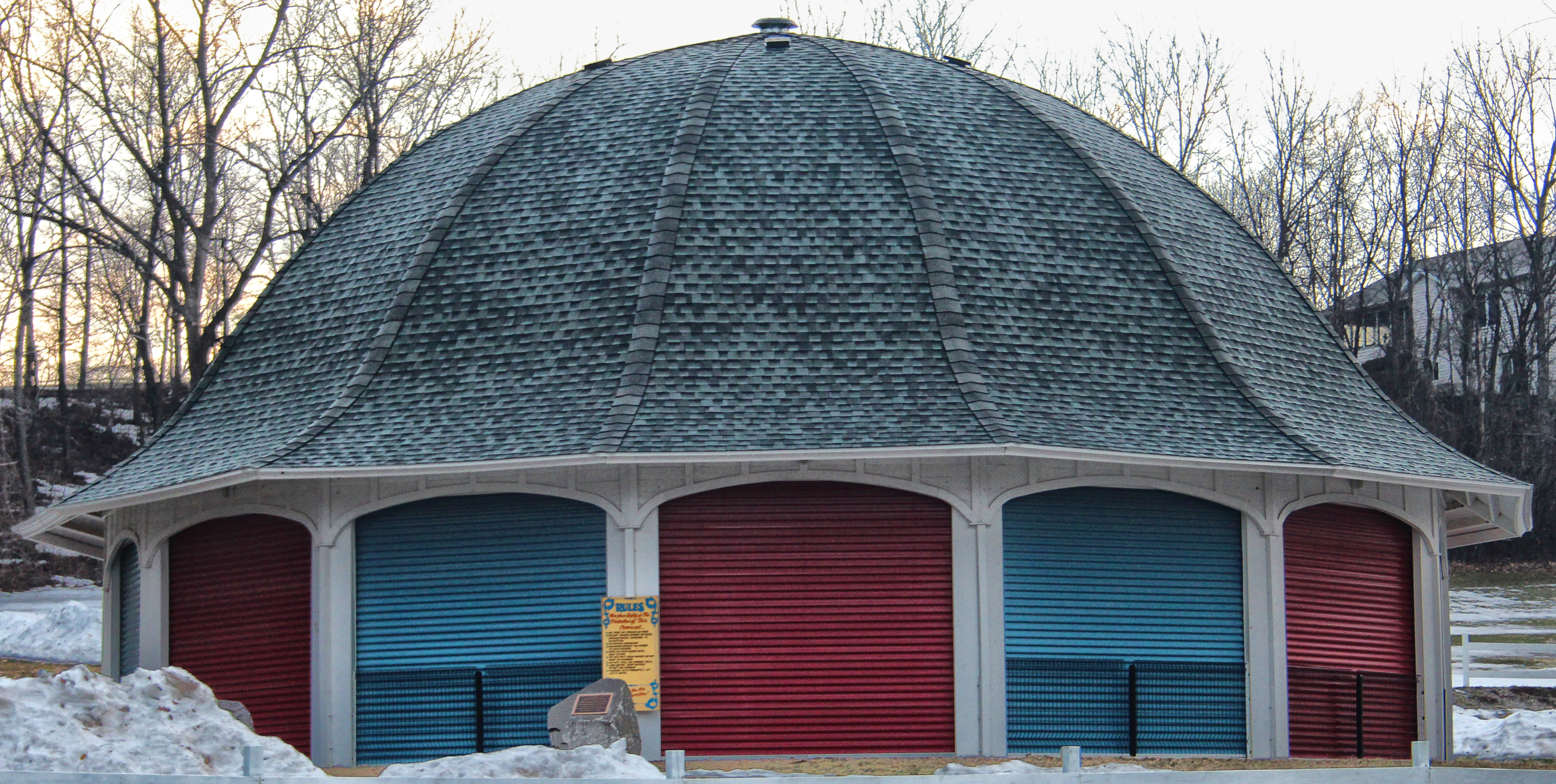
City of Waterloo Carousel
