= Waterloo, Fauquier County, Virginia =

Village in the U.S. state of Virginia

Coordinates: 38°41′45″N 77°54′22″W

Location of Waterloo, Virginia

Waterloo is a village in Fauquier County, Virginia, in the United States, straddling the Rappahannock River at its confluence with Carter's Run.

== History ==
The village has existed since at least 1749, when the decision was made to build a road from Warrenton (about 8 miles (13 km) east) to serve the growing number of farms along the river. With Fauquier County on the north side and Culpeper County on the south side, Waterloo is surrounded by relatively flat tracts of arable land.

In 1829, construction began on a canal to eventually connect Waterloo with Fredericksburg, about 58 miles (93 km) to the southeast. Finished in 1849, the canal included 44 locks and 20 dams, with 14 miles (23 km) of dug canal.

Commercial activities in Waterloo began to thrive as the canal was constructed because the water could also power mills. Eventually there was a sawmill, a clothing mill, a blacksmith, and a plan for a group of shops and factories on the Fauquier side to serve the community and the canal. However, when the Orange and Alexandria Railroad commenced operation in 1852, canal traffic rapidly declined, and the venture ceased to operate in 1853.

During the Civil War, both Union and Confederate soldiers occupied Waterloo at various times. In 1861, Confederate General Stonewall Jackson defeated Union General James Shields in an early skirmish; Shields' troops crossed the Waterloo Bridge from Culpeper to Fauquier on his retreat back to Washington, and in March 1862 he returned to Waterloo to help hand General Jackson a rare tactical defeat at the First Battle of Kernstown (about 50 miles (80 km) to the north). On August 22, 1862, Confederate General J. E. B. Stuart's army started its ride around the army of Union General John Pope in Waterloo. Stuart's force captured Pope's headquarters wagons and destroyed Union supplies and army materiel shortly before the second battle of Manassas. By war's end, all but a couple of Waterloo's buildings were destroyed or dismantled. See also First Battle of Rappahannock Station.

The current Waterloo Bridge was constructed in 1878 for $7,050 by the Virginia Bridge and Iron Company. A one-lane, wrought-iron bridge, it may be the oldest such bridge in Virginia. The counties of Fauquier, Culpeper, and Rappahannock all contributed to the funding in order to enable local farmers and merchants to deliver goods to market. U.S. Route 211 was routed across the bridge from 1926 until about 1930.

== Present day ==
Today, all that remains of the once-busy nexus of commerce is a one-lane bridge, a home built around 1830 by John Spillman Armstrong, and the former Waterloo Post Office (now a private residence) built on the Culpeper side in 1870 by Armstrong under contract with the U.S. Post Office. Local residents believe the post office was built by the U.S. government as a way of re-establishing its authority following the Civil War.
