= National Register of Historic Places listings in Rappahannock County, Virginia =

Location of Rappahannock County in Virginia

This is a list of the National Register of Historic Places listings in Rappahannock County, Virginia.

This is intended to be a complete list of the properties and districts on the National Register of Historic Places in Rappahannock County, Virginia, United States. The locations of National Register properties and districts for which the latitude and longitude coordinates are included below, may be seen in an online map.

There are 19 properties and districts listed on the National Register in the county, including 1 National Historic Landmark.

This National Park Service list is complete through NPS recent listings posted June 26, 2026.

== Current listings ==
	Name on the Register	Image	Date listed	Location	City or town	Description
1	Ben Venue	Ben Venue	December 28, 1979 (#79003075)	Northeast of Washington on Ben Venue Rd. 38°43′19″N 78°03′59″W	Washington	
2	Ben Venue Rural Historic District	Ben Venue Rural Historic District	February 2, 2016 (#15001042)	Ben Venue Rd. and Williams Farm, Fogg Mountain, Hickerson Mountain, and Points of View Lns. 38°43′46″N 78°04′11″W	Flint Hill	
3	Caledonia Farm	Caledonia Farm	December 28, 1990 (#90001996)	Junction of Dearing and Fodderstack Rds. 38°45′46″N 78°07′37″W	Flint Hill	
4	Calvert Mill/Washington Mill	Calvert Mill/Washington Mill	September 2, 1982 (#82004583)	East of Washington on U.S. Route 211; 38°42′46″N 78°09′07″W	Washington	
5	George L. Carder House	George L. Carder House	December 14, 2004 (#04000715)	456 Scrabble Rd. 38°35′59″N 78°08′15″W	Castleton	
6	Flint Hill Baptist Church	Flint Hill Baptist Church	December 1, 1997 (#97001509)	0.3 miles (0.48 km) north of the junction of U.S. Route 522 and Ben Venue Rd. 38°45′52″N 78°05′59″W	Flint Hill	
7	Flint Hill Historic District	Flint Hill Historic District	January 27, 2012 (#11001070)	Junction of U.S. Route 522 and Fodderstack, Crest Hill, and Ben Venue Rds. 38°45′46″N 78°06′00″W	Flint Hill	
8	Laurel Mills Historic District	Laurel Mills Historic District	November 27, 2004 (#04001273)	Roughly bounded by Laurel Mills Rd., the Thornton River, and Laurel Mills Farm; 38°38′55″N 78°05′20″W	Laurel Mills	
9	Locust Grove-R.E. Luttrell Farmstead	Locust Grove-R.E. Luttrell Farmstead	May 28, 2013 (#13000343)	24 Bunree Ln. 38°41′24″N 77°59′30″W	Amissville	
10	Meadow Grove Farm	Meadow Grove Farm	September 5, 2006 (#06000803)	21 Meadow Grove Ln. 38°40′41″N 78°04′38″W	Amissville	
11	John W. Miller House	John W. Miller House	January 3, 1991 (#90002010)	Junction of Slate Mills and Round Hill Rds. 38°31′52″N 78°10′37″W	Boston	
12	Montpelier	Montpelier	April 11, 1973 (#73002052)	South of Sperryville on State Route 231; 38°35′13″N 78°13′45″W	Sperryville	
13	Mount Salem Baptist Meetinghouse	Mount Salem Baptist Meetinghouse	May 24, 1979 (#79003076)	Southeast of Washington on Long Mountain Rd. 38°40′23″N 78°07′44″W	Washington	
14	Scrabble School	Scrabble School	October 31, 2007 (#07001143)	111 Scrabble Rd. 38°35′04″N 78°09′05″W	Castleton	
15	Skyline Drive Historic District	Skyline Drive Historic District	April 28, 1997 (#97000375)	Shenandoah National Park, from the north entrance station at Front Royal to the south entrance station at Rockfish Gap; 38°37′21″N 78°19′22″W	Luray	
16	Sperryville Historic District	Sperryville Historic District	February 10, 1983 (#83003300)	U.S. Route 522, Woodward Rd., and Main and Water Sts. 38°39′26″N 78°13′37″W	Sperryville	
17	Sunnyside	Sunnyside	November 27, 2004 (#04001274)	186 Sunnyside Orchard Ln. 38°44′07″N 78°09′55″W	Washington	
18	Washington Historic District	Washington Historic District	May 28, 1975 (#75002033)	Most of the historically contributing buildings are located in the core of the town on Main, Gay, Wheeler, Calvert, Middle, and Porter Sts. and Piedmont and Mt. Salem Aves. 38°42′51″N 78°09′34″W	Washington	
19	Washington Graded School	Washington Graded School	January 24, 2019 (#100003349)	267 Piedmont Ave. 38°42′47″N 78°09′53″W	Washington	

== See also ==
- List of National Historic Landmarks in Virginia
- National Register of Historic Places listings in Virginia
