= List of former primary state highways in Virginia (Culpeper and Northern Virginia Districts) =

The following is a list of former primary state highways completely or mostly within the Culpeper and Northern Virginia District (VDOT Districts 7 and 9), formerly combined as the Culpeper District, of the U.S. state of Virginia.

== SR 110 ==
State Route 110
- Location: Alexandria
- Length: 0.29 mi (470 m)
- Existed: 1947–1956

State Route 110 was a short primary state highway in Alexandria, Virginia, United States, planned to connect U.S. Route 1 with a bridge across the Potomac River to the District of Columbia.

The roadway was to begin at Henry Street (US 1, now southbound only) just south of First Street, head east-northeast to the intersection of Washington Street (now State Route 400) and Second Street, and then run east on Second Street to the river for a total length of 0.29 miles (0.47 km). The 0.16-mile (0.26 km) part on Second Street was added as a state highway connection, to be maintained by the City of Alexandria with state funding. The proposed bridge site was just south of the Shepherd's Landing Bridge, a temporary rail bridge built at Third Street during World War II in case of attack on the Long Bridge to the north. That rail bridge was demolished in early 1947. In 1956, SR 110 was removed from the state highway system, as the proposed bridge had moved to the south (to the location of the present Woodrow Wilson Bridge).

== SR 232 ==
State Route 232
- Location: Revercombs Corner-Boston
- Existed: 1928–1943

State Route 232 extended east along current SR 707 from SR 27 (now SR 231) at Revercombs Corner via Slate Mills to SR 3 (now US 522) at Boston. The westernmost 1 mile (1.6 km) was added to the state highway system in 1928 as State Route 706, which was extended 2.5 miles (4.0 km) in 1929, 1.7 miles (2.7 km) in 1930, and the remaining 2.1 miles (3.4 km) in 1932. SR 706 became SR 232 in the 1933 renumbering and was downgraded to secondary in 1943.

== SR 233 ==
State Route 233
- Location: Morrisville-Catlett
- Existed: 1928–1951

State Route 233 extended north along current SR 806 from US 17 at Morrisville via Elk Run and Bristersburg to SR 28 at Catlett. 6.6 miles (10.6 km) at the south end were added to the state highway system in 1928 as State Route 708, which was extended 2.5 miles (4.0 km) in 1929, 5 miles (8.0 km) in 1930, and another 4.2 miles (6.8 km) past Catlett in 1932. SR 708 became SR 233 in the 1933 renumbering and was extended the remaining 5.4 miles (8.7 km) to SR 28 (now SR 215) near Bristow in October 1933. The segment northeast of Catlett became part of a realigned SR 28 in the 1940 renumbering, and the remainder was downgraded to secondary in 1949, effective completion of ongoing construction work. The last mention of the route in the State Highway Commission minutes is in 1951, when a portion of old road bypassed by this construction was abandoned.

== SR 242 ==
State Route 242
- Location: Culpeper-Flint Hill-Marshall
- Existed: 1928–1948

State Route 242 extended north from SR 229 near Culpeper over present secondary SR 729 to Ben Venue (former El Dorado Turnpike) and Flint Hill (former Front Royal and Gaines's Cross Roads Turnpike), then turned northeast along present SR 647 (former Salem Station and Rappahannock Turnpike beyond Vernon Mills) to SR 55 near Marshall. A portion through Cresthill, Jerrys Shop, and Vernon Mills was never a primary route.

State Route 707 was created in 1928, running south from US 211 at Ben Venue to the Rappahannock-Culpeper County line. It was extended south another 2.4 miles (3.9 km) in 1930 and 5 miles (8.0 km) in 1932, and became part of SR 49 in the 1933 renumbering. Later in 1933, this portion of SR 49 was extended the rest of way to SR 29 north of Culpeper, making SR 49 continuous from Ben Venue to Culpeper (and beyond to Jefferson). The road from Ben Venue northwest to Flint Hill was added to SR 49 in 1934 (1.4 miles (2.3 km)) and 1935 (2.5 miles (4.0 km)).

Two segments of State Route 718 were created in 1932, running southwest from SR 55 near Marshall for 2.9 miles (4.7 km) and east from SR 37 (now US 522) at Flint Hill for 4.8 miles (7.7 km) to 0.2 miles (0.32 km) short of the Rappahannock-Fauquier County line (though later maps show it reaching the line). Both pieces became SR 242 in the 1933 renumbering, and the Marshall end was extended another 3/4 mile (1.2 km) later that year, taking it to just beyond Ada.

As part of the 1940 renumbering, SR 49 from Culpeper south to Powhatan became part of SR 522, and the orphaned piece north of Culpeper was renumbered as part of SR 242. The original pieces of SR 242 were downgraded to secondary in 1942 (Marshall end) and 1944 (Flint Hill end), becoming extensions of existing SR 647. Culpeper to Flint Hill survived until 1948, when it too was downgraded (to SR 729) pending completion of ongoing construction work south of Ben Venue.

Major intersections

County	Location	mi	km	Destinations	Notes
Culpeper		0.00	0.00	SR 229 (Rixeyville Road)	
Rappahannock	Ben Venue	20.27	32.62	US 211 (Lee Highway)	
Rappahannock	Flint Hill	24.17	38.90	US 522 south (Zachary Taylor Highway)	south end of US 522 overlap
Rappahannock	Flint Hill	24.57	39.54	US 522 north (Zachary Taylor Highway)	south end of US 522 overlap
Rappahannock		29.32	47.19	SR 647 (Crest Hill Road)	county line (Rappahannock River bridge)
Gap in route
Fauquier		0.00	0.00	SR 647 (Crest Hill Road)	
Fauquier		3.59	5.78	SR 55 (John Marshall Highway)	
1.000 mi = 1.609 km; 1.000 km = 0.621 mi

== SR 243 ==
State Route 243
- Location: Burtonville-Stanardsville-southwest
- Existed: 1930–1943

State Route 243 extended from US 29 at Burtonville west to US 33 near Stanardsville on current secondary SR 609 (the former Fredericksburg and Valley Plank Road), then southwest from US 33 (now US 33 Business) in Stanardsville for 4 miles (6.4 km) along current SR 622, SR 624, and SR 602 to 1/2 mile (0.80 km) short of Amicus. The former portion was added to the state highway system in 1930 as State Route 719, and the latter was added in 1932. The route became SR 243 in the 1933 renumbering; the part southwest of Stanardsville was downgraded to secondary in 1942, partly becoming an extension of existing SR 604, with the remainder joining it in 1943 as an extension of existing SR 609.

== SR 245 ==
State Route 245
- Location: Bluemont
- Existed: 1931–1943

State Route 245 was a short spur from SR 7 to SR 734 in Bluemont, along what is now secondary SR 760. The route was added to the state highway system in 1931 as State Route 726, which became SR 245 in the 1933 renumbering (at which time the description indicated that an extension to US 50 was planned). In the 1940 renumbering, SR 234 was realigned at Aldie to replace all of SR 245 including the proposed extension (explicitly stated to follow SR 734). In 1943 this piece of SR 234 was downgraded to secondary.

== SR 246 ==
State Route 246
- Location: Hawlin-Woodville
- Existed: 1930–1942

State Route 246 extended east along current SR 618 from SR 27 (now SR 231) via Hawlin to SR 3 (now US 522) at Woodville. 3.4 miles (5.5 km) at the east end were added to the state highway system in 1930 as State Route 723, which was extended the rest of the way to the west end in 1932. SR 723 became SR 246 in the 1933 renumbering and was downgraded to secondary in 1942 as an extension of existing SR 618.

== SR 247 ==
State Route 247
- Location: west of Columbia
- Existed: 1931–1943

State Route 247 was a short spur from SR 6 between Holmhead and Columbia south to SR 624, along a portion of current SR 656. The route was added to the state highway system in 1931 as State Route 727, connecting the new alignment of SR 19 (now SR 6) to the former alignment (now SR 624). SR 727 became SR 247 in the 1933 renumbering (at which time the description indicated that an extension to US 15 south of Dixie was planned, which, if it was to use existing roads, would have followed SR 656 all the way to Bremo Bluff). SR 247 was downgraded to secondary in 1943 as an extension of existing SR 656.

== SR 248 ==
State Route 248
- Location: Washington-northwest
- Existed: 1932–1943

State Route 248 extended northwest from US 211 (now US 211 Bus.) in Washington for 1 mile (1.6 km) in the direction of Bentonville along current secondary SR 622 (no road currently connects Washington to Bentonville directly). It was added to the primary state highway system in 1932, with no number given, became SR 248 in the 1933 renumbering, and was downgraded to secondary in 1943 as an extension of existing SR 622.

== SR 275 ==
State Route 275
- Location: Mechanicsville-Potomac River
- Existed: 1941–1954

State Route 275 followed the old Hillsborough and Harper's Ferry Turnpike through the Loudoun Valley, now secondary SR 671, from SR 9 at Mechanicsville north to US 340 at the Potomac River near Loudoun Heights. It was added to the primary state highway system in 1941 as an upgrade of SR 688, at the same time as the connecting segment of US 340 was added, and downgraded to SR 671 in 1954.

Major intersections

The entire route is in Loudoun County.

Location	mi	km	Destinations	Notes
Mechanicsville	0.00	0.00	SR 9 (Charles Town Pike) – Leesburg, Charles Town, WV	
	7.57	12.18	US 340 (Jefferson Pike) – Harpers Ferry	
1.000 mi = 1.609 km; 1.000 km = 0.621 mi

== SR 335 ==
State Route 335
- Location: SR 6-Schuyler
- Existed: 1928–1949

State Route 335 was a branch from SR 6 to Schuyler. It ran along current secondary SR 800 (Schuyler Road) from SR 1809 (Havenwood Lane, former SR 6) to Rockfish River Road (SR 617) in Schuyler.

The road was first added to the state highway system in 1928, when SR 19 was extended from Scottsville to Schuyler (based on mileage, it stopped short of SR 617). SR 19 was moved in September 1930 onto what had been its temporary alignment, bypassing Schuyler via Faber and removing the road into Schuyler from the system for about three months. In December it was restored as State Route 19Y, now extending all the way to modern SR 617.

The designation changed to State Route 6Y in the 1933 renumbering (since SR 19 became SR 6) and to State Route 335 in the late 1930s. Due to reconstruction, SR 6 was removed from SR 1809 to its modern alignment (leaving behind SR 800) in the 1940s, and rather than extend SR 335 to meet it, the state downgraded SR 335 to secondary in April 1949. The old alignments of SR 6 near Schuyler, including current SR 1809, were abandoned in August.
