= Ben Venue Rural Historic District =

Historic district in Virginia, United States

- U.S. National Register of Historic Places
- U.S. Historic district
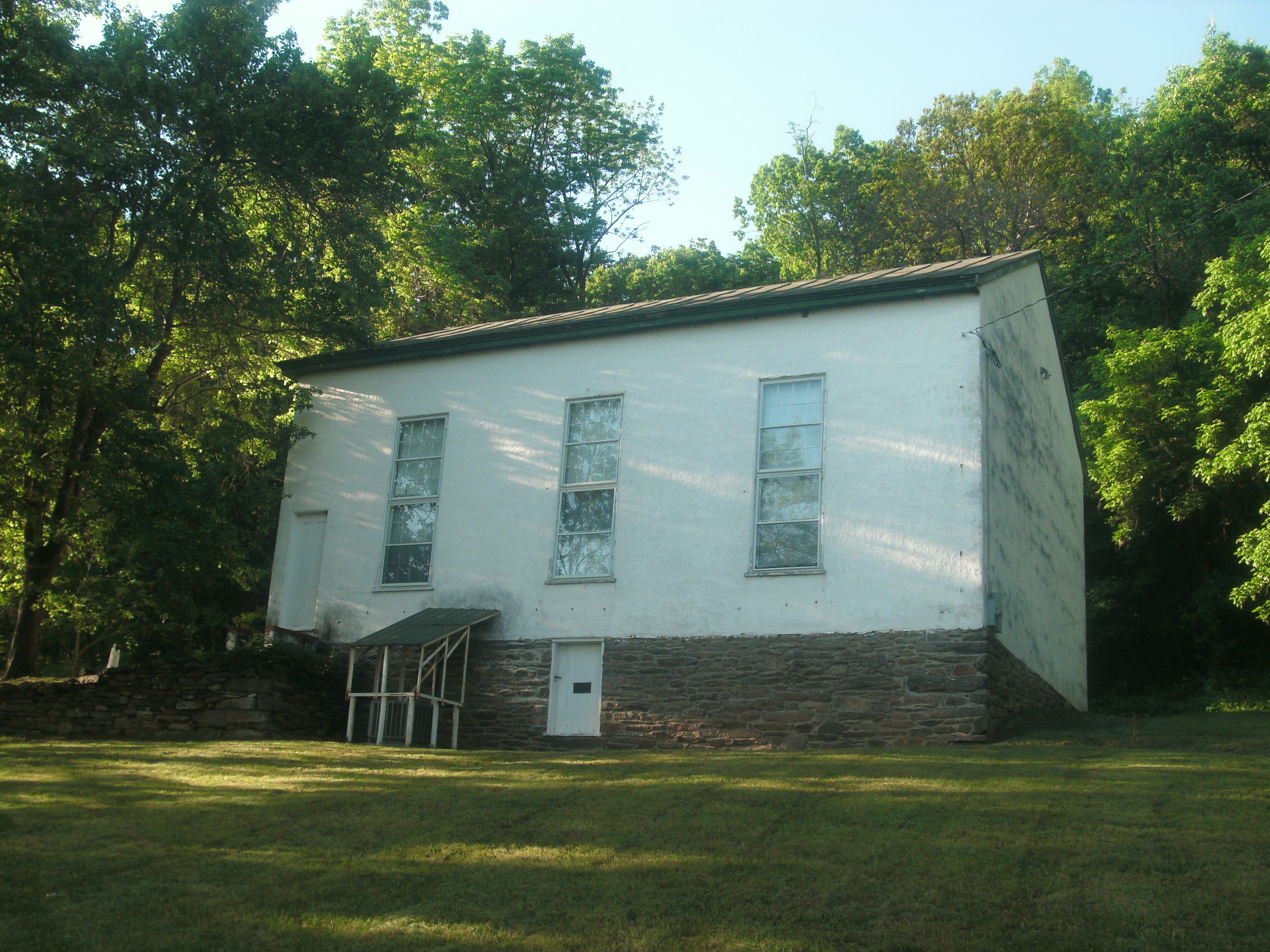
- Battle Run Primitive Baptist Church, May, 2016

- Location within Virginia Location within the United States
- Location: Ben Venue Rd., Williams Farm, Fogg Mountain, Hickerson Mountain and Points of View Lns., near Flint Hill, Rappahannock County, Virginia
- Coordinates: 38°43′17″N 78°03′51″W
- Area: 2,630 acres (1,060 ha)
- Built: 1740
- NRHP reference No.: 15001042
- Added to NRHP: February 2, 2016

The Ben Venue Rural Historic District encompasses a large rural historic landscape in northeastern Rappahannock County, Virginia. It is centered on Ben Venue Road, between United States Route 211 in the south and the village of Flint Hill in the north, and encompasses more than 2,600 acres (1,100 ha) of rural landscape, affording fine panoramic views of the Blue Ridge Mountains to the west. This area was developed agriculturally beginning in the mid-18th century by wealthy Virginia families, around what was one of the region's first turnpikes, and has maintained its rural character in the intervening centuries. Prominent properties in the district include the 1844 Ben Venue estate and the 1773 Battle Run Primitive Baptist Church.

The district was added to the National Register of Historic Places in 2016.

== See also ==
- National Register of Historic Places listings in Rappahannock County, Virginia
