= Lincoln Maazel =

American actor and singer (1903–2009)

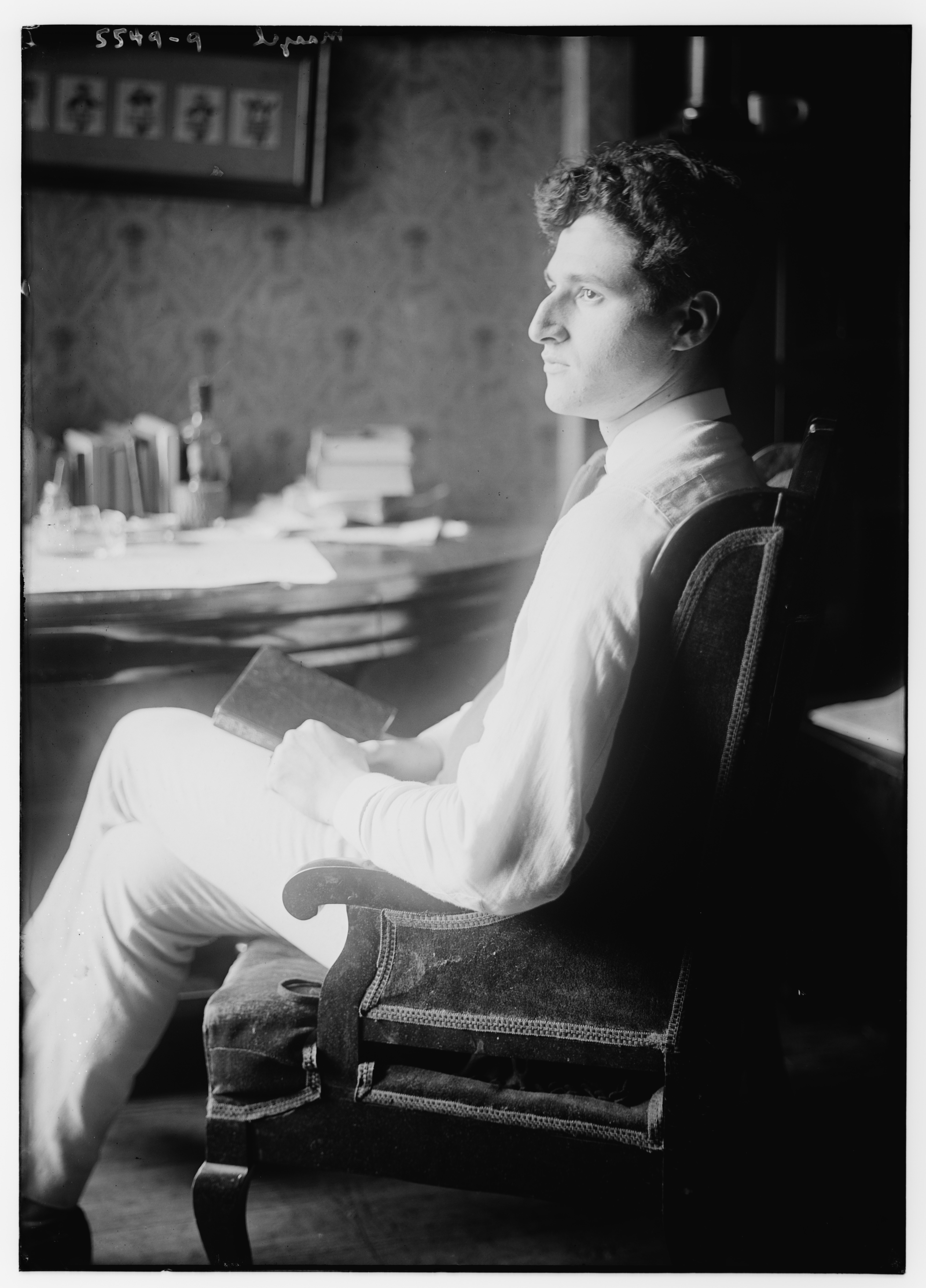
- Born: February 12, 1903; New York City, U.S.
- Died: September 15, 2009 (aged 106); Castleton, Virginia, U.S.
- Occupations: Singer; actor
- Spouse: Marion Shulman Maazel (m. 1928; died 1993)
- Children: Lorin Maazel

Lincoln Maazel (February 12, 1903 – September 15, 2009) was an American singer and actor of stage and screen.

== Biography ==
Maazel was born on February 12, 1903, in New York City to Russian Jewish parents. In 1920, aged 17, he and 30 other young people were picked to perform at the Shubert Theater on Broadway, where he sang the Prologue to Pagliacci. He later moved to Los Angeles, California and developed into a performer at nightclubs and for local television.

As an actor, Maazel did not start an onstage career until he was 56 but proceeded to appear in stage plays for the Pittsburgh Playhouse, the Civic Light Opera, Little Lake Theater, Mountainview Playhouse, Odd Chair Playhouse and White Barn Theatre. In 1977, he appeared in the screen role for which he is best known in George A. Romero's Martin.

In 1928 he married his wife Marie (died 1993) in Paris. On March 6, 1930, his son, conductor Lorin Maazel (1930–2014) was born. In 2003 he became a centenarian. He died six years later on September 15, 2009, in Castleton, Virginia, United States, at the age of 106.

== Filmography ==
Year	Title	Role	Notes
1973	The Amusement Park	Unnamed main character	Considered lost until 2017; re-released in 2019
1977	Martin	Cuda	
