= John W. Miller House =

Historic house in Virginia, United States

- U.S. National Register of Historic Places
- Virginia Landmarks Register
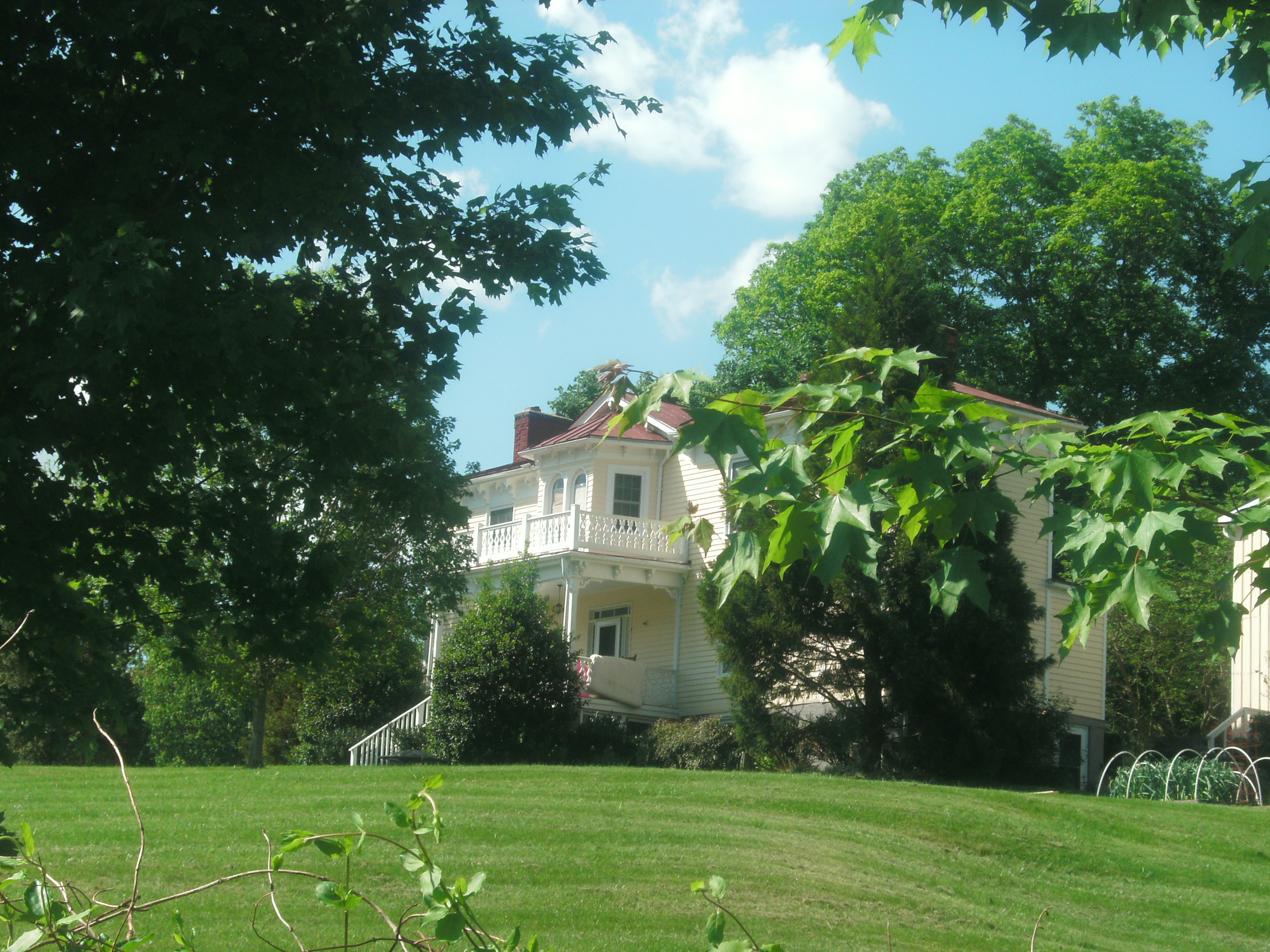
- The John W. Miller house in May, 2016

- Location within Virginia Location within the United States
- Location: Junction of VA 707 and VA 604, near Boston, Virginia
- Coordinates: 38°31′51″N 78°10′37″W
- Area: 18.4 acres (7.4 ha)
- Built: 18421843
- Architectural style: Italianate, I-house
- NRHP reference No.: 90002010
- VLR No.: 078-0161

Significant dates
- Added to NRHP: January 3, 1991
- Designated VLR: April 17, 1990

John W. Miller House is a historic home located near Boston, in Rappahannock County, Virginia. It was built in 1842–1843, and is a two-story, I-house, with a central-passage plan and interior end chimneys. It was adorned in 1880–1881, with Italianate features, including an elaborate two-story front porch. The property also includes the contributing kitchen / quarters, ice house, barn, and Miller family cemetery.

It was added to the National Register of Historic Places in 1991.
