= Dietlinde Turban =

German actress

Dietlinde Turban Maazel
- Born: Dietlinde Turban; 27 August 1957 (age 68); Reutlingen, Germany
- Spouse(s): Lorin Maazel (1986–2014 (his death)); Antony Wood (2018 – present)
- Website: http://dietlindeturban.com/

Dietlinde Turban (born 27 August 1957 in Reutlingen in Germany) is the birth name and stage name of Dietlinde Turban Maazel, a German actress. Her brother is the violinist Ingolf Turban.

Dietlinde Turban's first stage appearance at the age of 19 as Gretchen in Goethe's Faust at the Residenz-Theatre in Munich brought her national fame. In rapid succession she starred in new productions of Lessing's Minna von Barnhelm (as Minna), Shakespeare's Othello (as Desdemona – for which she received the Bad Hersfeld Festival prize for best actress), and in works of Anouilh, Giraudoux and others. She was invited as guest star at the State Theater in Bonn and the Josefstadt Theatre in Vienna.

Thanks to scores of films and plays filmed for television, Turban won Germany's coveted Bambi Award by popular vote as Best Actress of the Year (1983). Among her film credits: the title role in Goethe's Stella and Schiller's Intrigue and Love (Luise), the role of Mozart's sister-in-law Aloysia in the French film biography of the composer, a small role in Sidney Sheldon's American thriller Bloodline (1979), and the part of Euridice in the Jean-Pierre Ponnelle/Harnoncourt adaptation of Monteverdi's Orfeo, the lead-roles in Cold Homeland, The Ungrateful (1980), Peter Schamoni's The Castle in Konigswald and the World War II story Mussolini and I (1985), in which she played opposite Anthony Hopkins.

In 2004 Turban performed her first One Woman Play Constantly Risking Absurdity which she premiered in Castleton and at the Cherry Lane Theatre, New York. She performed it a year later at the George Mason University and was also invited with this play to Salzburg, Austria, by the American Austrian Foundation, for the inauguration of Schloss Arenberg in 2005. In the summer 2013 she performed Jean Cocteau's La Voix Humaine at the Castleton Festival.

Turban Maazel appeared as soloist/narrator with the New York Philharmonic, the Pittsburgh Symphony, the National Symphony Orchestra and the Symphony Orchestra of the Bavarian Radio, Munich. Turban Maazel has recorded a number of audio books (Naxos) as well as CDs in collaboration with young composers. She also performs dramatic readings of literary masterpieces both in the United States and in Europe and tours with recitals based on works by Andersen, Fontane, Heine, Kafka, Rilke, Schiller, Thomas Mann ("Das Teufelsgespräch" from Doktor Faustus), and a portrayal of Lou Andreas Salomé.

Turban Maazel studied violin, classical dance and voice in Munich (Musikhochschule), New York and Aspen. Her theatre studies include Master Classes with Peter Brook, Lee Strasberg and the T. Schreiber Studio, New York City.

In 1986 she married the conductor Lorin Maazel. They have two sons and a daughter.

In 1996 she founded a private school for low-income families on her Virginia Estate and developed a pilot educational project designed to explore new ways of integrating vital artistic and aesthetic values into school curricula, inspired by Rudolf Steiner.

In 2009 Turban Maazel co-founded the Castleton Festival with her husband, Maestro Lorin Maazel. After his death in 2014 she took over as artistic director and CEO. In addition to overseeing a year-round performance season at the Castleton Theatre (CiP) she works as a private performance coach in Manhattan and teaches every summer at the "Castleton Artists Training Seminar" (CATS), the Castleton Festival's Young Artist Program.

She married Antony Wood on 1 July 2018.

Turban Maazel lives in New York City where she works as a stage director and private acting coach. She created the course "Acting for Singers" for Rutgers University where she is on faculty. She regularly holds masterclasses and is a guest faculty member of the International Vocal Arts Institute and Highland Opera Studios in the U.S. and Canada.

== Selected filmography ==
=== Television ===
- Derrick – Season 5, Episode 3: "Abendfrieden" (1978), as Annabelle Schönerer
- Derrick – Season 5, Episode 13: "Abitur" (1978), as Lisa Klose
- Ihr 106. Geburtstag (1979), as Fifine
- Cold Homeland (1979), as Julia Zeitler
- Der Thronfolger (1980), as Doris Ritter
- The Ungrateful (1980), as Sonja Schmitt
- Kabale und Liebe (1980, based on Intrigue and Love), as Luise Miller
- Überfall in Glasgow (1981), as Liz Sandon
- Little Zaches called Cinnabar (1982, based on Little Zaches called Cinnabar), as Candida
- Stella (1982, based on Stella), as Stella
- Bretter, die die Welt bedeuten (TV series, 1982), as Susanne
- Derrick – Season 9, Episode 6: "Das Alibi" (1982), as Martina Busse
- Mozart (TV miniseries, 1982), as Aloysia Weber
- Frau Jenny Treibel (1982, based on Frau Jenny Treibel), as Corinna Schmidt
- Nachruf auf Othello (1983), as Catherine Wood
- Mussolini and I (TV miniseries, 1985), as Felizitas Beetz
- Derrick: "Die Tänzerin" (1985), as Katrin May
- Deadly Nightcap (1986), as Anna Truman
- Fatal Love (1986), as Sarah Erdmann
- Rette mich, wer kann (TV series, 1986), as Clarissa
- L'ingénieur aimait trop les chiffres (1989), as Linda Sorbier

=== Film ===
- Bloodline (1979)
- The Salt Prince (1983), as Princess Barbora
- Schloß Königswald (1988), as Fürstin Ursela
