= Castleton Festival =

Classical music festival in Virginia, US

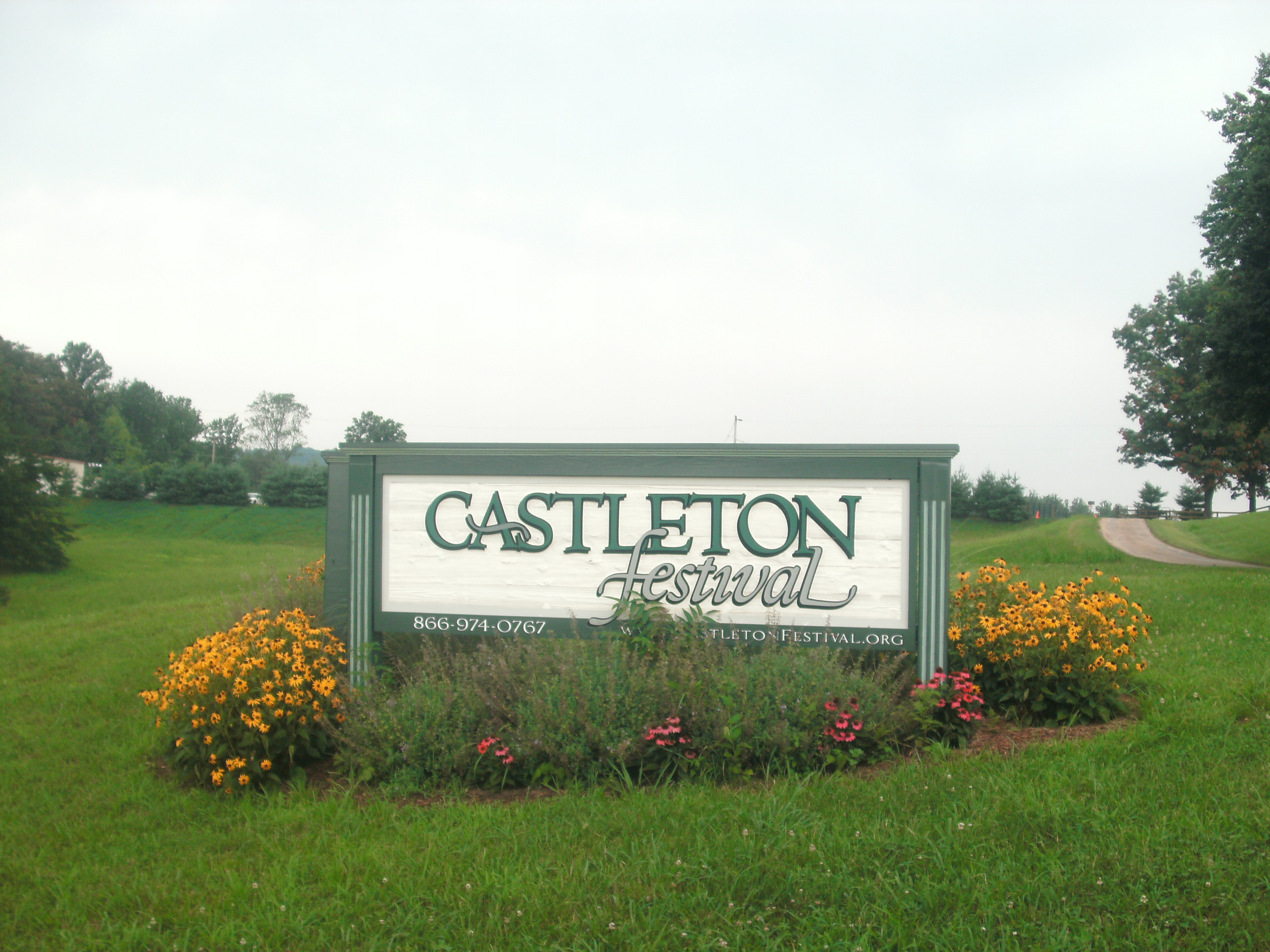
- Castleton Festival entrance sign
- Status: active
- Genre: Classical music festival
- Frequency: Annually
- Location: Castleton, Virginia
- Inaugurated: 1997
- Founder: Lorin Maazel and Dietlinde Turban-Maazel
- Organiser: The Chateauville Foundation
- Website: castletonmusic.org

The Castleton Festival, launched in the summer of 2009, is a program of The Chateauville Foundation, established in 1997 by Lorin Maazel and Dietlinde Turban-Maazel. The Castleton Festival is located on Lorin Maazel's estate in Castleton, Virginia.

== Background ==
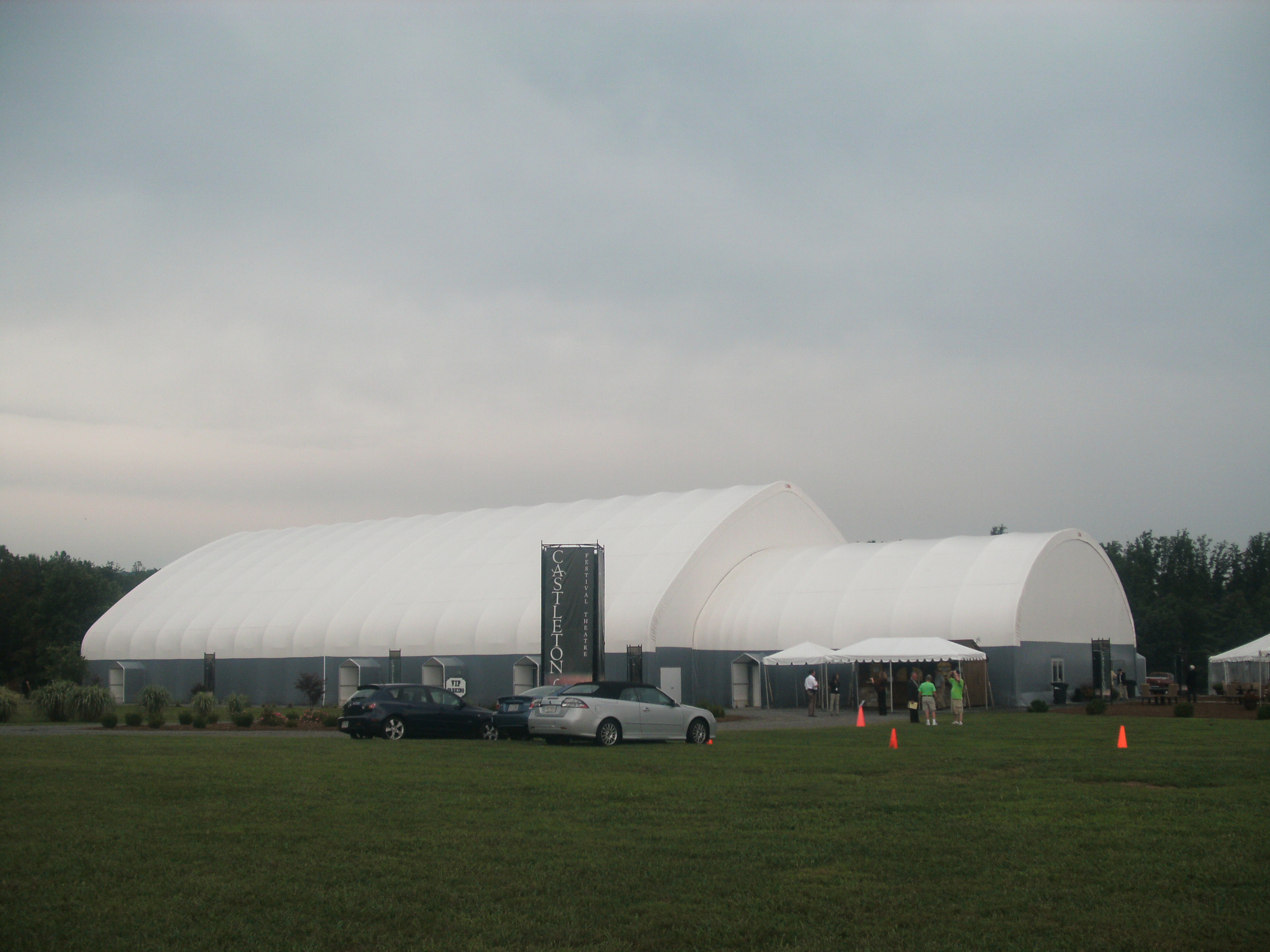
Tent-theater at the Castleton Festival

A Theatre House, sitting on the foundations of what was once a large-scale chicken coop, serves as the focal point of the Foundation's year round activities. The Foundation continues to present artists and ensembles of the highest caliber through a regular season of a dozen or more presentation each year.

In addition to its performance activities, the Foundation regularly lures students to its facilities and offers outreach opportunities and in-school activities within Rappahannock County.

In recent years, the Foundation's work has focused most prominently on the growth of young artists; advanced students and emerging professionals. Starting with the Castleton Residency, a program launched in 2006, such artists have come annually to Castleton Farms to live and work together intensively under the guidance of Maestro Maazel, producing a series of chamber opera productions in the Theatre House.

The program blossomed into the first Castleton Festival in 2009, creating expanded opportunities for the participants through the inclusion of symphonic concerts, master classes (most notably the Lorin Maazel Master Class for conductors with Rolex as the Founding Partner), recitals and a range of formal and informal performances and training activities.

The Castleton Festival’s 2015 season was supported by private contributions and grants from the National Endowment for the Arts, the Virginia Commission for the Arts, and the Virginia Tourism Corporation.

A virtual festival was held in 2020.
