= Lorin Maazel =

French and American conductor (1930–2014)

- Maazel in 1958
- Born: March 6, 1930; Neuilly-sur-Seine, France
- Died: July 13, 2014 (aged 84); Virginia, U.S.
- Occupations: Conductor, violinist, composer
- Years active: 1950–2014
- Known for: Directing and conducting: Cleveland Orchestra; Orchestre National de France; Vienna State Opera; New York Philharmonic Orchestra
- Parents: Lincoln Maazel (father); Marion Shulman (mother)
- Website: https://www.maestromaazel.com/

Lorin Varencove Maazel (/məˈzɛl/; March 6, 1930 – July 13, 2014) was an American conductor, violinist and composer. He began conducting at the age of eight and by 1953 had decided to pursue a career in music. He had established a reputation in the concert halls of Europe by 1960 but his career in the U.S. progressed far more slowly. He served as music director of The Cleveland Orchestra, Orchestre National de France, Pittsburgh Symphony Orchestra, Bavarian Radio Symphony Orchestra, the Münchner Philharmoniker and the New York Philharmonic, among other posts. Maazel was well regarded in baton technique and had a photographic memory for scores. Described as mercurial and forbidding in rehearsal, he mellowed in old age.

== Early life ==
Maazel was born to American parents of Ukrainian Jewish origin in Neuilly-sur-Seine, France. His grandfather Isaac Maazel (1873–1925), born in Poltava, Ukraine, then in the Russian Empire, was a violinist in the Metropolitan Opera orchestra. He and his wife Esther Glazer (1879–1921), originally from Kharkiv, Ukraine, then in the Russian Empire, came to North America in 1900 after the birth of their eldest son Marvin (1899–1988), who later became a pianist and composer.

Maazel was brought up in the United States, primarily at his parents' home in the city of Pittsburgh's Oakland neighborhood. His father, Lincoln Maazel (1903–2009), was a singer, teacher of voice and piano, and an actor (he co-starred in George A. Romero's 1978 horror movie Martin); and his mother, Marion "Marie" Shulman Maazel (1894–1992), founded the Pittsburgh Youth Symphony Orchestra.

Maazel was a child prodigy and had perfect pitch. He had his first conducting lesson at age seven with Vladimir Bakaleinikov, making his debut at age eight, conducting the University of Idaho Orchestra in Schubert's "Unfinished" Symphony in Los Angeles in 1938. In the same year, he conducted the National High School Orchestra at the National Music Camp in Interlochen, Michigan. The following year, he conducted 11 concerts by the same orchestra at the New York World's Fair. At the age of eleven, he guest-conducted the NBC Symphony Orchestra on the radio. At twelve he toured the United States to conduct major orchestras. By 1943 he emerged as the conductor of the Philharmonic-Symphony Orchestra at New York City's Lewisohn Stadium performing César Franck's Symphony in D minor. He made his violin debut at the age of fifteen. He attended the Fanny Edel Falk Laboratory School at the University of Pittsburgh as a child, followed by Peabody High School and the University of Pittsburgh. Maazel studied briefly with Pierre Monteux in 1945.

== Early career ==
In the early 1950s, Maazel toured as the conductor with the Gershwin Concert Orchestra. The orchestra consisted of 25 members and a noted array of soloists. The orchestra was organized in cooperation with Ira Gershwin, to give the public a comprehensive Gershwin program. The list of soloists included George Gershwin's friend, Jesús María Sanromá, Carolyn Long and Theodor Uppman.

In 1960, Maazel became the first American to conduct at the Bayreuth Festspielhaus. He was chief conductor of the Deutsche Oper Berlin from 1965 to 1971 and the Radio-Symphonie-Orchester (RSO) Berlin from 1964 to 1975.

== Tenure in Cleveland ==
External audio
- You may hear Lorin Maazel with the Cleveland Orchestra performing Johannes Brahms's Symphony No. 1 in C Minor, Op. 68 for Decca records Here on Archive.org

At the age of 13, Lorin Maazel was introduced to the citizens of Cleveland in a pension fund concert at Public Hall on March 14, 1943. He conducted a selection of pieces that included the overture from Wagner's opera Rienzi and Schubert's "Unfinished" symphony, and his orchestra featured 14-year-old prodigy Patricia Travers on violin. Earlier in his young career, Maazel had already guest conducted the NBC Symphony, New York Philharmonic, Los Angeles Philharmonic, and Pittsburgh Symphony. It was Artur Rodziński, in the midst of defending his decision to leave Cleveland for a post with the New York Philharmonic, who half-jokingly stated: "Look [Maazel] over, he may be your next conductor." However, it would be nearly thirty years before Maazel would become music director of The Cleveland Orchestra, succeeding George Szell in 1972.

In the wake of Szell's crisp, chamber-like style, many critics fretted over Maazel's emotional interpretations. Shortly after Maazel was named to the post in Cleveland, though, his status was buoyed by both an endorsement from Philadelphia Orchestra music director Eugene Ormandy and the promise of a recording contract with Decca Records. In addition, Maazel chose to revitalize the orchestra's educational outreach programs for the city's schoolchildren. He envisioned an annual concert at Public Hall where the chorus would be made up of area students. This project launched on May 19, 1973, with a program that included music from Gershwin's opera Porgy and Bess, Copland's A Lincoln Portrait, and an English-language version of the "Ode to Joy" from Beethoven's Ninth Symphony. With more than 5,000 people in attendance, the concert provided a capstone to Maazel's first season in Cleveland.

A month later, the orchestra completed its first recording in three years — Prokofiev's Romeo and Juliet for Decca. The ensemble also returned to international touring during the 1973-74 season with a first-ever visit to Australia and New Zealand. Because of a tightly-packed schedule, conducting duties were split between Maazel, Stanislaw Skrowaczewski, and former music director Erich Leinsdorf. The season, which also featured performances of Strauss's one-act opera Elektra at Cleveland's Severance Hall and New York's Carnegie Hall, closed with a dozen concerts across Japan.

External audio
- You may hear Lorin Maazel interviewed by Robert Sherman on WQXR-FM in 1975; Here on wnyc.org

In 1974-75, Maazel led the Orchestra on a tour of South America and Central America. He also conducted the ensemble's recording of Gershwin's Porgy and Bess — the orchestra's first recording of an opera and Decca's first opera recording in the United States. Three years later, on December 10, 1978, he guided the orchestra's 60th anniversary concert, which included Victor Herbert's American Fantasy — also played during the ensemble's debut concert on December 11, 1918.

The following fall, however, rumors began to swirl that Maazel was the top candidate for the directorship of the Vienna State Opera. Although the appointment was still several years away, arrangements were made to have Maazel conduct The Cleveland Orchestra through the 1981-82 season before departing for Europe. During the final years of Maazel's tenure in Cleveland, the Musical Arts Association launched a concert to honor the life and works of Dr. Martin Luther King, Jr., which would become an annual tradition, and the orchestra hosted a 50th anniversary celebration for Severance Hall featuring the same program as the ensemble played on the concert hall's opening night in 1931 — Bach's Passacaglia in C Minor, Charles Martin Loeffler's Invocation, Brahms's First Symphony, and selections from Beethoven's Missa Solemnis.

Across Maazel's final season with The Cleveland Orchestra, he would conduct only seven of the season's subscription series concerts. His last performance at Severance Hall, on May 15, 1982, included a presentation of Verdi's Requiem, which he also brought on tour the following week to Lincoln Center, Carnegie Hall, and Woolsey Hall at Yale University. The Verdi had been Maazel's debut piece in New York with The Cleveland Orchestra at the start of his tenure in 1972.

== Later years ==
In 1977, he became music director of the Orchestre National de France in Paris, a position he held until 1991.

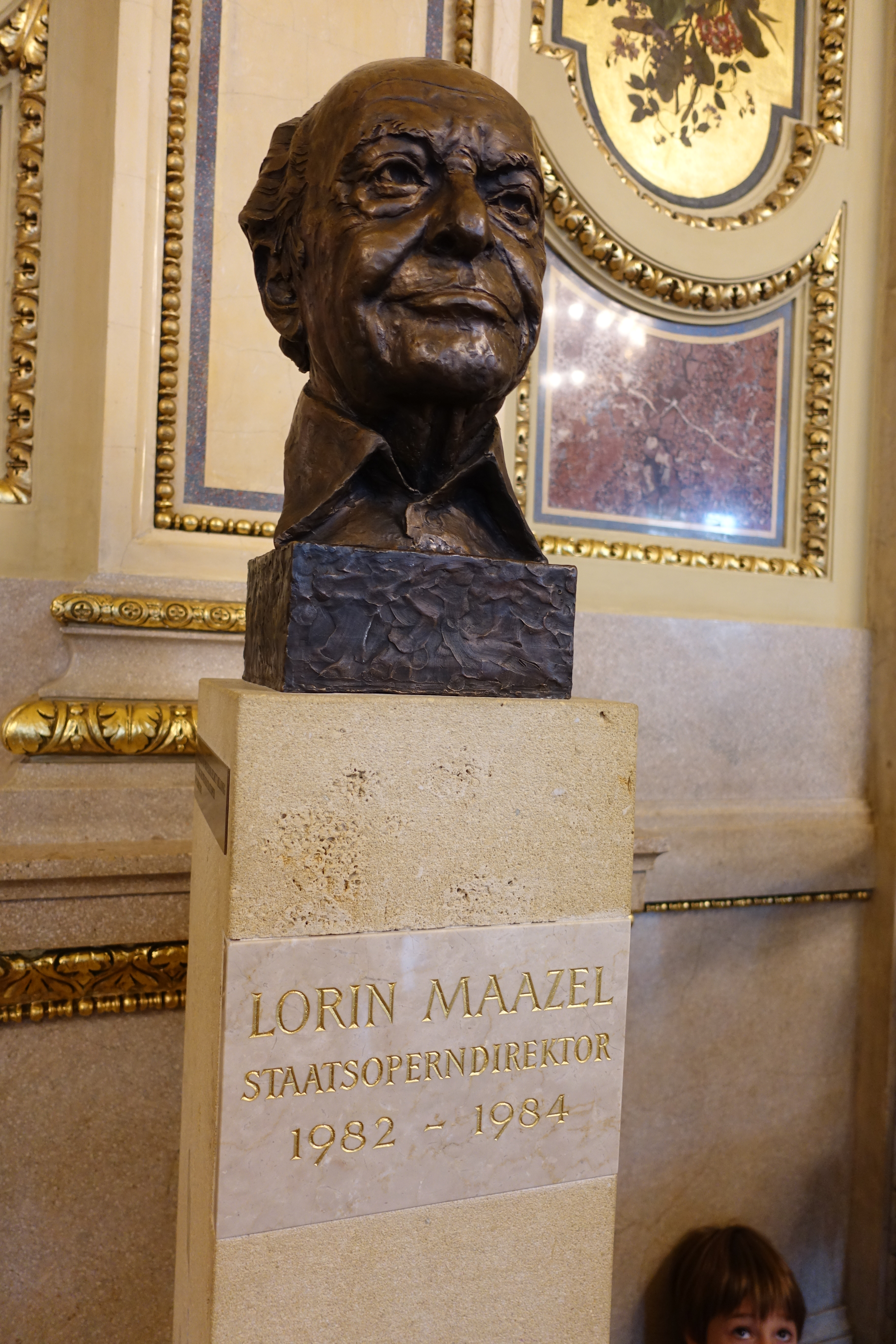
Interior of the Vienna State Opera

From 1982 to 1984, Maazel served at the Vienna State Opera as general manager and principal conductor. In 1980, he succeeded Willi Boskovsky as conductor at the Vienna New Year's Concert and he led this televised annual event each year, until 1986. He returned to it four times: in 1994, 1996, 1999 and 2005.

From 1984 to 1988, Maazel was the music consultant to the Pittsburgh Symphony Orchestra, and its music director from 1988 to 1996.

In 1989, expecting to become successor to Herbert von Karajan as chief conductor of the Berlin Philharmonic, Maazel suddenly and publicly severed all connections with the orchestra when it was announced that Claudio Abbado was to take over. He claimed that his decision was because he was concerned for the orchestra's well-being.

From 1993 until 2002, he was chief conductor of the Bavarian Radio Symphony Orchestra in Munich.

In 2000, Maazel made a guest-conducting appearance with the New York Philharmonic in two weeks of subscription concerts after an absence of over twenty years, which met with positive reaction from the orchestra musicians. This engagement led to his appointment in January 2001 as the orchestra's next music director, starting in 2002, succeeding Kurt Masur. Maazel conducted the New York Philharmonic on their landmark visit to Pyongyang, North Korea on February 26, 2008. He led the orchestra in renditions of the North Korean and United States national anthems, Dvořák's New World Symphony, George Gershwin's An American in Paris, and closed with the traditional Korean folk song "Arirang". Maazel stepped down from the New York Philharmonic after the 2008/09 season.

External image
- Photograph of Lorin Maazel rehearsing the Vienna Philharmonic Orchestra in 2004; Here on Getty Images

In 2004, Maazel became the music director of the Arturo Toscanini Philharmonic. From September 2006 till March 2011, he was the musical director of the Orquestra de la Comunitat Valenciana, the house orchestra of the opera house Palau de les Arts, Valencia, Spain. His last concert there as music director took place on his 81st birthday on March 6, 2011, conducting his only opera 1984. In March 2010, Maazel was named chief conductor of the Munich Philharmonic, effective with the 2012/13 season. Early in 2014, Maazel cancelled concert engagements as a result of ill health. Subsequently, in June 2014, he announced his resignation as music director of the Munich Philharmonic, effective immediately.

Maazel conducted the music for three operatic films, Don Giovanni (1979), Carmen (1984) and Otello (1986). His own compositions included a poorly reviewed opera, 1984, based on the George Orwell novel Nineteen Eighty-Four and a humorous work for orchestra, flute and narrator which he composed for James Galway: Irish Vapors and Capers.

He was depicted conducting Vienna's New Year concert on an Austrian postage stamp issued in 2005. Maazel and his wife, Dietlinde Turban together operated a summer music festival called Castleton Festival at their Castleton, Virginia 600-acre (2.4 km^{2}) estate, Castleton Farms. Maazel arranged Wagner's Ring Cycle into a 70-minute suite, The 'Ring' Without Words, which he recorded in 1987 with the Berlin Philharmonic.

== Death ==
Maazel died on July 13, 2014, at his Castleton Farms estate in Virginia, from complications of pneumonia.

== Honors ==
External audio
- Lorin Maazel with James Galway performing his "Irish Vapors and Capers" and "Farewell's", Op. 14 in 2005; Listen on Archive.org

Maazel's catalogue contained over 300 recordings of works by Beethoven, Brahms, Mahler, Mozart, Schubert, Richard Strauss and others. He earned 10 Grand Prix du Disque awards.

Maazel was a Commander of the Légion d'honneur of the French Republic and of the Finnish Order of the Lion. He was decorated with the Bundesverdienstkreuz of the Federal Republic of Germany. On 27 May 2013, he received an honorary membership of the Vienna State Opera and the "Großes Goldenes Ehrenzeichen" of Austria.

Maazel received the Italian Premio Abbiati and was an Honorary Life Member of the Israel Philharmonic. In addition, he was a Kentucky Colonel.

== Select recordings ==
- John Adams: On the Transmigration of Souls with the New York Philharmonic Orchestra (Nonesuch) · Recorded 09/19-24-2002
- Johann Sebastian Bach: Brandenburg Concertos, with the RSO Berlin (1966, Philips);
- Johann Sebastian Bach: Suites, with the RSO Berlin (1966, Philips);
- Johann Sebastian Bach: Mass in B minor, with the RSO Berlin (1966, Philips);
- Johann Sebastian Bach: Easter Oratorio, with the RSO Berlin (1966, Philips);
- Ludwig van Beethoven: Complete Symphonies (1–9), with the Cleveland Orchestra (CBS);
- Ludwig van Beethoven: Fidelio, with the Vienna Philharmonic Orchestra and the Vienna State Opera Choir, featuring soloists Birgit Nilsson (soprano), James McCracken (tenor), Kurt Böhme (bass), Tom Krause (baritone), Graziella Sciutti (soprano), Donald Grobe (tenor), et al. (Decca 448104)
- Vincenzo Bellini, I Capuleti e i Montecchi - Antonietta Pastori/Fiorenza Cossotto/Renato Gavarini/Lorin Maazel/Orchestra Sinfonica e Coro di Roma della Radiotelevisione Italiana, 1957 Melodram
- Alban Berg: Lulu, with the Vienna State Opera Orchestra, featuring Julia Migenes (soprano), Brigitte Fassbaender (mezzo-soprano), Theo Adam (baritone), Ryszard Karczykowski (tenor), et al. (RCA 74321 57734 2)
- Hector Berlioz: Symphonie Fantastique with the Cleveland Orchestra (Telarc) · Recorded 5/10/1982
- Georges Bizet: Carmen (film 1984), with the Orchestre National de France and the Radio France Chorus, featuring soloists Julia Migenes (soprano), Plácido Domingo (tenor), Faith Esham (soprano), Ruggero Raimondi (bass-baritone), Lillian Watson (soprano), Susan Daniel (mezzo-soprano), et al. (Erato New DVD CDR10530)
- Georges Bizet – Carmen with Chor und Orchester der Deutschen Oper Berlin, featuring soloists Anna Moffo (soprano) Helen Donath (soprano) Franco Corelli (tenor) Piero Cappuccilli (baritone) Arlee Augér (soprano) (BMG RCA CD 69147) -
- Johannes Brahms: The Four Symphonies, Tragic Overture, Variations on a Theme of Haydn, Academic Festival Overture, with the Cleveland Orchestra (Decca);
- Benjamin Britten: The Young Person's Guide to the Orchestra with Lorin Maazel narrating, with the French National Radio Orchestra · Recorded 1-2/1962
- Anton Bruckner: Symphony No.8 with the Berlin Philharmonic Orchestra (EMI) · Recorded 1/1990

External audio
- Lorin Maazel with the Vienna Philharmonic performing Antonin Dvorak's Symphony No. 8 in 1982; Listen on Archive.org

- Anton Bruckner: Complete Symphonies, Symphony in D minor with the Bavarian Radio Symphony Orchestra (BR Klassik);
- Antonín Dvořák: Symphony No. 8 and Symphony No. 9 with the Vienna Philharmonic (DG) · Recorded 3/1981; 10/1982
- Manuel de Falla: El amor brujo and Dances from The Three-Cornered Hat with the Radio Symphony Orchestra, Berlin (DG) · Recorded 6/1965
- César Franck: Symphony in D minor, with the Berlin Radio Symphony Orchestra (DG) · Recorded 1/1967
- George Gershwin: Porgy and Bess, with the Cleveland Orchestra and the Cleveland Orchestra Chorus featuring soloists Leona Mitchell, Willard White, Florence Quivar, Barbara Hendricks, François Clemmons, McHenry Boatwright, Arthur Thompson, Barbara Conrad, et al. (Decca)
- George Frideric Handel: Music for the Royal Fireworks and Water Music Suite, with the RSO Berlin (1966, Philips);
- Joseph Haydn: Symphony No. 103 and Symphony No. 92, with the RSO Berlin (1969, Concert Hall)
- Gustav Mahler: Complete symphonies (1–9 plus the Adagio of Symphony No. 10), with the Vienna Philharmonic Orchestra (CBS/Sony)
- Felix Mendelssohn: Symphony No. 4 and Symphony No. 5 with the Berlin Philharmonic Orchestra (DG) · Recorded 4/1960 and 1/1961
- Wolfgang Amadeus Mozart: Don Giovanni (1979 film), with the Choeur et Orchestre de l'Opéra national de Paris, featuring soloists Ruggero Raimondi, Teresa Berganza, Kiri Te Kanawa, José van Dam, et al. (CBS Masterworks)
- Wolfgang Amadeus Mozart: Violin Concerto No. 3 and Violin Concerto No. 5, with the English Chamber Orchestra (1975, Klavier Records)
- Wolfgang Amadeus Mozart: Symphony No. 25 and Symphony No. 29, with the RSO Berlin (1970, Concert Hall)
- Wolfgang Amadeus Mozart: Symphony No. 38 and Symphony No. 39, with the RSO Berlin (1967, Philips)
- Wolfgang Amadeus Mozart: Symphony No. 40 and Symphony No. 41, with the RSO Berlin (1967, Philips)
- Modest Mussorgsky: Pictures at an Exhibition (orch. Ravel) and Night on Bald Mountain (orch. Nikolai Rimsky-Korsakov) with the Cleveland Orchestra (Telarc CD-80042) · Recorded 10/20/1978
- Sergei Prokofiev: Peter and the Wolf, with Alec Clunes, narrator, with the French National Radio Orchestra (DG) · Recorded 1-2/1962 (The French release features Madeleine Renaud as narrator, the Italian Eduardo De Filippo, the Spanish Juan Pulido, the German Mathias Wieman and the Japanese Tetsuko Kuroyanagi)
- Sergei Prokofiev: Romeo and Juliet, with the Cleveland Orchestra (Decca)
- Giacomo Puccini: Tosca, with the Orchestra e Coro dell'Accademia di Santa Cecilia, Birgit Nilsson, Franco Corelli, Dietrich Fischer-Dieskau (1966, Decca 460753)
- Giacomo Puccini: Turandot, with the Orchestra & Choir of the Vienna State Opera, featuring soloists Éva Marton, José Carreras, Katia Ricciarelli (CBS Masterworks)
- Sergei Rachmaninoff: with the Berlin Philharmonic Orchestra (DG)
  - Symphony No. 1 – 4&6/1984
  - Symphony No. 2 – 12/1982
  - Symphony No. 3 – 11/1981
  - Symphonic Dances, Vocalise, and Intermezzo from Aleko – 1/1983
  - The Rock – 4&6/1984
  - Isle of the Dead 11/1981
- Maurice Ravel: L'enfant et les sortilèges, with the French National Radio Orchestra and the Radio France Chorus, featuring soloists Françoise Ogéas (soprano), Jeannine Collard (alto), Jane Berbié (soprano), Sylvaine Gilma (soprano), Colette Herzog (soprano), Michel Sénéchal (tenor), Heinz Rehfuss (baritone), et al. (DG 423718) Recorded 11/1960
- Maurice Ravel: L'heure espagnole, with the French National Radio Orchestra, featuring soloists Jane Berbie (Concepcion, Torquemada's Wife), Jean Gireadeau (Torquemada), Gabriel Bacquier (Ramiro, muleteer), Jose van Dam (Don Iñigo Gomez, banker), Michel Senechal (Gonzalve, student) (DG) Recorded 2/1965
- Maurice Ravel: Daphnis et Chloé, with the Cleveland Orchestra (Decca 4250 492)
- Ottorino Respighi: Pines of Rome, with the Berliner Philharmonic (DG 138 033) Recorded 12/1958
- Ottorino Respighi: Pines of Rome and Roman Festivals, with the Cleveland Orchestra (Decca) Recorded 5/1976
- Nicholas Rimsky-Korsakov: Suite from The Golden Cockerel, with the Cleveland Orchestra (Decca) Recorded 10/1979
- Nicholas Rimsky-Korsakov: Symphony No.2, with the Pittsburgh Symphony Orchestra (Telarc) Recorded 3/1986

External audio
- Lorin Maazel with the Israel Philharmonic in selected overtures by Beethoven: Leonore No. 1, Op. 138; Leonore No. 2, Op. 72A; Leonore No. 3, Op. 72A; Fidelio Overture, Op. 72B; Recorded in 1962 Listen on Archive.org

- Franz Schubert: with the Berlin Philharmonic Orchestra (DG)
  - Symphony No.2 – 3/1962
  - Symphony No.3 – 3/1962
  - Symphony No.4 – 11/1959
  - Symphony No.5 – 1/1961
  - Symphony No.6 – 1/1961
  - Symphony No.8 – 11/1959
- Franz Schubert: Complete Symphonies, with the Bavarian Radio Symphony Orchestra (BR Klassik);
- Alexander Scriabin: Piano Concerto in F sharp and Prometheus with London Philharmonic Orchestra, Vladimir Ashkenazy, piano (London) Recorded 4/1971
- Alexander Scriabin: The Poem of Ecstasy, with the Cleveland Orchestra (London) Recorded 5/1978
- Dmitri Shostakovich: Symphony No.5, with Cleveland Orchestra (Telarc) Recorded 4/1981
- Jean Sibelius: Complete symphonies (1–7), with the Vienna Philharmonic Orchestra (Decca 430778) Recorded 1963–1968
- Richard Strauss: Symphonic Poems, with the Bavarian Radio Symphony Orchestra.
- Igor Stravinsky: The Firebird Suite and Song of the Nightingale, with Radio Symphony Orchestra, Berlin (DG) 11/1957
- Igor Stravinsky: The Rite of Spring with the Cleveland Orchestra (Telarc) · Recorded 5/14/1980
- Peter Tchaikovsky: Symphony No.2 with the Pittsburgh Symphony Orchestra (Telarc) · Recorded 3/1986
- Peter Tchaikovsky: Symphony No.4 with the Berlin Philharmonic Orchestra (DG) · Recorded 1/1960
- Peter Tchaikovsky: Complete symphonies (1–6), Romeo and Juliet, with the Vienna Philharmonic Orchestra (Decca 430787) Recorded 1964–1965
- Giuseppe Verdi: La Traviata, with Choir and Orchestra of Deutsche Oper Berlin, Pilar Lorengar, Giacomo Aragall, Dietrich Fischer-Dieskau (1968, Decca 443000)
- Giuseppe Verdi: Otello (1986 film), with the Orchestra & Choir of La Scala, featuring soloists Plácido Domingo, Katia Ricciarelli, Justino Díaz (EMI)
- Antonio Vivaldi: The Four Seasons, with members of the Orchestre National de France (1984, CBS Masterworks);
- Richard Wagner: The "Ring" Without Words, with the Berlin Philharmonic (TELARC CD-80154) · Recorded 1988
- Andrew Lloyd Webber: Variations with Julian Lloyd Webber (cello) and the London Philharmonic Orchestra (Philips 420 342)
- Andrew Lloyd Webber: Requiem with Plácido Domingo, Sarah Brightman, Paul Miles-Kington and the English Chamber Orchestra (EL 270242 1)

Cultural offices
Preceded by Ferenc Fricsay	Principal Conductor, Radio-Symphonie-Orchester Berlin; 1964–1975	Succeeded by Riccardo Chailly
Preceded by (no predecessor)	Principal Conductor, Orquestra de la Comunitat Valenciana; 2006–2011	Succeeded by Omer Meir Wellber
