= The Amusement Park =

1973 American film directed by George A. Romero (released in 2019)

- Re-release poster by Aleksander Walijewski
- Directed by: George A. Romero
- Screenplay by: Wally Cook
- Produced by: Karl Rabeneck
- Starring: Lincoln Maazel
- Cinematography: S. William Hinzman
- Edited by: George A. Romero
- Production companies: Laurel Productions; Communicators Pittsburgh
- Distributed by: Yellow Veil Pictures; Shudder
- Release dates: June 1975 (17th American Film Festival); June 8, 2021 (United States)
- Running time: 54 minutes
- Country: United States
- Language: English
- Budget: $37,000

The Amusement Park is a 1975 American horror film directed and edited by George A. Romero from a screenplay by Wally Cook. It stars Lincoln Maazel, Harry Albacker, Phyllis Casterwiler, Pete Chovan and Sally Erwin. Filmed in 1973, it was commissioned by the Lutheran Service Society of Western Pennsylvania as an educational film about elder abuse. The Amusement Park is one of Romero's only films to be devoid of supernatural elements.

The film premiered two years after its production at the 1975 American Film Festival in New York. However, it failed to find a distributor; for 44 years after its initial showing, it was considered to be a lost film, with many, including Romero's later wife Suzanne Desrocher-Romero, being unaware of its existence. In 2017, a 16 mm print of The Amusement Park was found and sent to Romero shortly before his death. The film underwent a 4K restoration supervised by Desrocher-Romero, which premiered in Pittsburgh on October 12, 2019, before receiving its first wide release on June 8, 2021, when Shudder released it for home media in most English-speaking countries. It received very positive reviews, with critics, who deemed it atypical of Romero's work, praising its direction and social commentary.

== Plot ==
The film opens with an informational prologue by Lincoln Maazel, who explains how society constantly overlooks and undervalues the elderly. He tells the viewer that they are about to watch a film that acts as a metaphorical description of how the elderly are mistreated.

An elderly man, played by Maazel, sits in a white room, bandaged, bloodied and with his once nice white suit dirtied. Another man, also played by Maazel, enters looking clean and in good spirits. He attempts to communicate with the tired version of himself and tells him that he is going to the park despite him telling him that "there is nothing out there." The cleaner man walks through the door and is immediately in the park. On the outside the door is not connected to anything. The man walks about and happily examines his surroundings before coming across a ticket taker who swindles other septuagenarians out of their things with low pay. He buys some tickets from him which take the form of money in the park.

The man gets on a rollercoaster with strange signage, rides a train where one of the older passengers supposedly dies and is ignored once in a coffin and witnesses a man's license get revoked due to poor eyesight. While playing in the bumper cars, an "accident" occurs complete with a police officer and lawyer arriving on the scene. The man tries to offer assistance, but it becomes apparent that he needs to wear glasses and therefore cannot be seen as a reliable alibi. He goes to eat at a food stand, lampooned as a restaurant, as waiters ignore him and several other elders for a wealthy individual. When the man finally gets his food, he sympathetically gives it to the other elders.

The man buys groceries, but cannot carry them all so he simply takes some crackers and a jar of peanut butter. As he sits to eat, he beckons some children to come and converse with him, but a younger man accuses him of being a "degenerate" and he leaves in shame. The man is beckoned into a building by younger people who tell him that he will have fun, but upon entering, it is a claustrophobic room where elders are forced to perform in uncomfortable exercise machines. He leaves, but breaks his glasses in the process. He comes upon a fortune teller and witnesses a young couple enter and ask what their future will be like. The fortune teller shows them that they will be living in a soon-to-be-built apartment building where they will have little support from their personal doctor and neighbors. Angry, the young man leaves and punches the older man who collapses.

When the man comes to his senses, the park is empty save for three bikers who beat him and then take his tickets. As people suddenly appear, they all ignore him. With very little money, he goes to get first aid. The medical center, set up like a store, is full of various elders equipment and the doctors and nurses hastily rush everyone through. The man finds himself simply getting a band aid on his head and a cane and is ushered out. He comes upon some men trying to sell retirement homes and ends up getting pick-pocketed. The pick-pocket is revealed to run a freak show, which simply consists of elders dressed in casual clothing. Everyone is upset and as the man gets up to leave, he is suddenly chased by the patrons who accuse him of trying to escape the freak show. He finds "sanctuary", but it closes upon his arrival.

The man finally gets some solace when a little girl offers for him to read The Three Little Pigs to her and have some chicken. The mother apathetically takes her and the book away as he finally breaks down into tears. He leaves the piece of chicken behind and walks back to the white room; resigned and defeated. Moments later, a cleaner optimistic version of himself enters as the scene from the beginning repeats. The man sits tired and powerless over not being able to stop his younger self.

Maazel appears one last time to tell the viewer that they can help the elderly through already established programs. He signs off with "I'll see you in the park... someday."

== Cast ==
- Lincoln Maazel
- Harry Albacker
- Phyllis Casterwiler
- Pete Chovan
- Sally Erwin
- Jack Gottlob
- Halem Joseph
- Bob Koppler
- Marion Cook
- Michael Gornick
- George A. Romero

== Production ==
The Amusement Park was originally produced in 1973, between director George A. Romero's films Season of the Witch and The Crazies; The Amusement Park was the only film Romero made on a work-for-hire basis. The film was shot over the course of three days at the now-defunct West View Park in West View, Pennsylvania, on a budget of $37,000.

The film was commissioned by the Lutheran Service Society of Western Pennsylvania, as an educational film about elder abuse and ageism. According to Romero's wife, Suzanne Desrocher-Romero, "They [did] use it initially, but I suspect that they thought it was a little edgier than they would have liked," and it was soon shelved.

== Release ==
The film premiered at the American Film Festival in New York in June 1975, and screened at some events and festivals in different years.

=== Loss and rediscovery ===
The film was believed lost until a 16 mm print that was used in a Romero retrospective at the Torino Film Festival in 2001 was sent to Romero and his wife in 2017. The 16 mm print and a DVD copy were given to Desrocher-Romero. This print was then screened at Spectacle Theater in New York in March 2018. She, along with the George A. Romero Foundation, oversaw a 4K restoration of the film by New York-based film preservation organization IndieCollect.

The restoration premiered in Pittsburgh on October 12, 2019.

In February 2021, it was announced that Shudder had acquired the streaming distribution rights for the film in North America, the United Kingdom, Ireland, Australia, and New Zealand. It was released on Shudder on June 8, 2021.

The film was invited for screening at 25th Bucheon International Fantastic Film Festival held on July 9, 2021, in the Strange Hommage section.

== Reception ==
On Rotten Tomatoes, the film has an approval rating of 97% based on 76 reviews, with an average rating of 7.8/10. The website's critics consensus reads: "A blunt yet visceral depiction of society's treatment of the elderly, The Amusement Park sees George A. Romero exploring a different -- yet still chilling -- type of terror." On Metacritic, the film has a weighted average score of 77 out of 100, based on 16 critics, indicating "generally favorable reviews".

Peter Bradshaw, writing for The Guardian, gave the film three out of five stars, calling it "an absurdist nightmare." Chris Evangelista of /Film gave the film a score of 10 out of 10, writing: "I can't remember the last time a film shook me like this." Jim Vorel of Paste called The Amusement Park "a strange, occasionally mesmerizing film that is not often pleasant to look at, but contains an air of nihilistic doom that is often effectively disturbing." Screen Anarchy's Jaime Grijalba Gómez called it a miracle to be able to see the previously lost film but lamented that sometimes its "metaphors are too obvious."

The film was ranked #22 on Rotten Tomatoes' Best Horror Movies of 2021 list.
