= Elk Run, Virginia =

Unincorporated community in Virginia, United States

- Unincorporated community
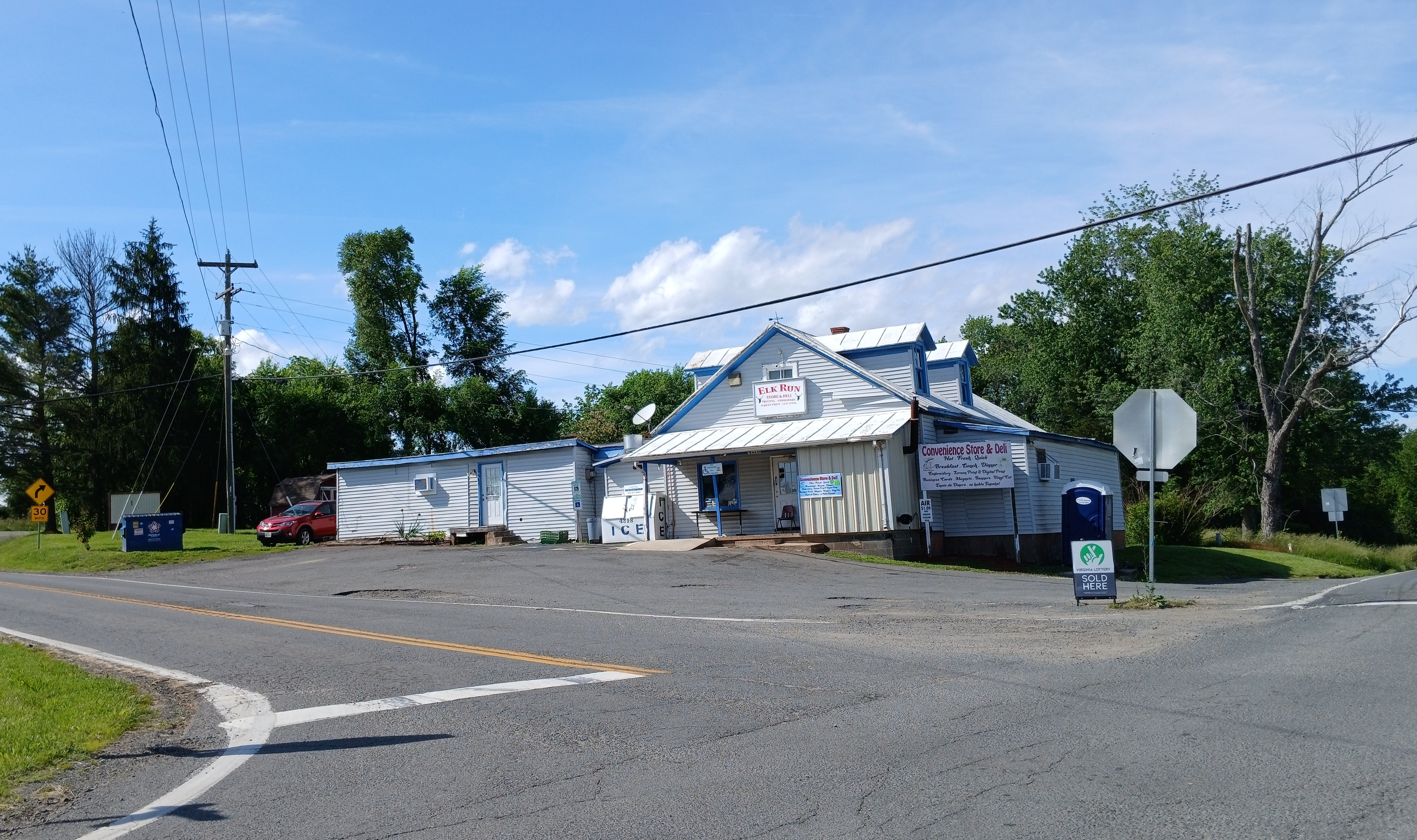
- Central Elk Run, May 2025

- Location within Northern Virginia Location within Virginia Location within the United States
- Coordinates: 38°33′15″N 77°40′19″W
- Country: United States
- State: Virginia
- County: Fauquier
- Time zone: UTC−5 (Eastern (EST))
  - Summer (DST): UTC−4 (EDT)

Elk Run is an unincorporated hamlet in Fauquier County, Virginia, United States. It is centered on State Route 806 and State Route 610. Prior to European settlement, the area was home to the Manahoac people.

It is famous among the locals for the historical Elk Run Church site built in the late 18th century. All that remains is a foundation and the gravesites. The church site is now the site of a commemorative park. Its first minister was James Keith, grandfather of Chief Justice John Marshall. He is buried at the church site.

The community is small, but active. There is one commercial building serving the community.

The Elk Run Church site has been preserved and marked with historical information markers.
