= Burtonville, Virginia =

Unincorporated community in Virginia, United States

Coordinates: 38°16′23″N 78°20′56″W

Burtonville is an unincorporated community in Greene County, Virginia, United States.
