= Holmhead, Virginia =

Unincorporated community in Virginia, United States

Coordinates: 37°46′25″N 78°12′32″W

Holmhead is an unincorporated community in Fluvanna County, in the U.S. state of Virginia.
