= Dorothea Ritter =

- Born: 1714
- Origin: Prussia
- Died: 1762 (aged 47–48)
- Occupation: Singer

Dorothea Ritter (1714 – 1762) was a Prussian singer. She is known for her suspected role in the escape attempt of the future king Frederick the Great in 1730.

She was the daughter of the theologian Matthias Ritter. Known for her musical talent and singing voice, she performed in the St Nicholas church in Potsdam. She befriended crown prince Frederick in 1730, and they played music together and took walks in the park with Johann Ludwigs von Ingersleben. When Frederick made his attempted escape in 1730, Dorothea Ritter was arrested as a suspected accomplice and subjected to a physical examination to establish whether she and Frederick had a sexual relationship; the result convinced the king that they had not, but she was publicly whipped and imprisoned in the working house in Spandau, accused of having known about the escape of the crown prince without notifying the king, and her father lost his position. She was released in 1733, and married the spice merchant Franz Heinrich Schommer. In 1744, she successfully applied to the king for permission for her spouse to use a fiacre. She was quite talked of in contemporary Europe and portrayed as a love object of Frederick, but their friendship was reportedly never of a sexual or romantic nature and they never had contact after 1730.
