= Flint Hill Baptist Church =

Historic church in Virginia, United States

- U.S. National Register of Historic Places
- U.S. Historic district – Contributing property
- Virginia Landmarks Register
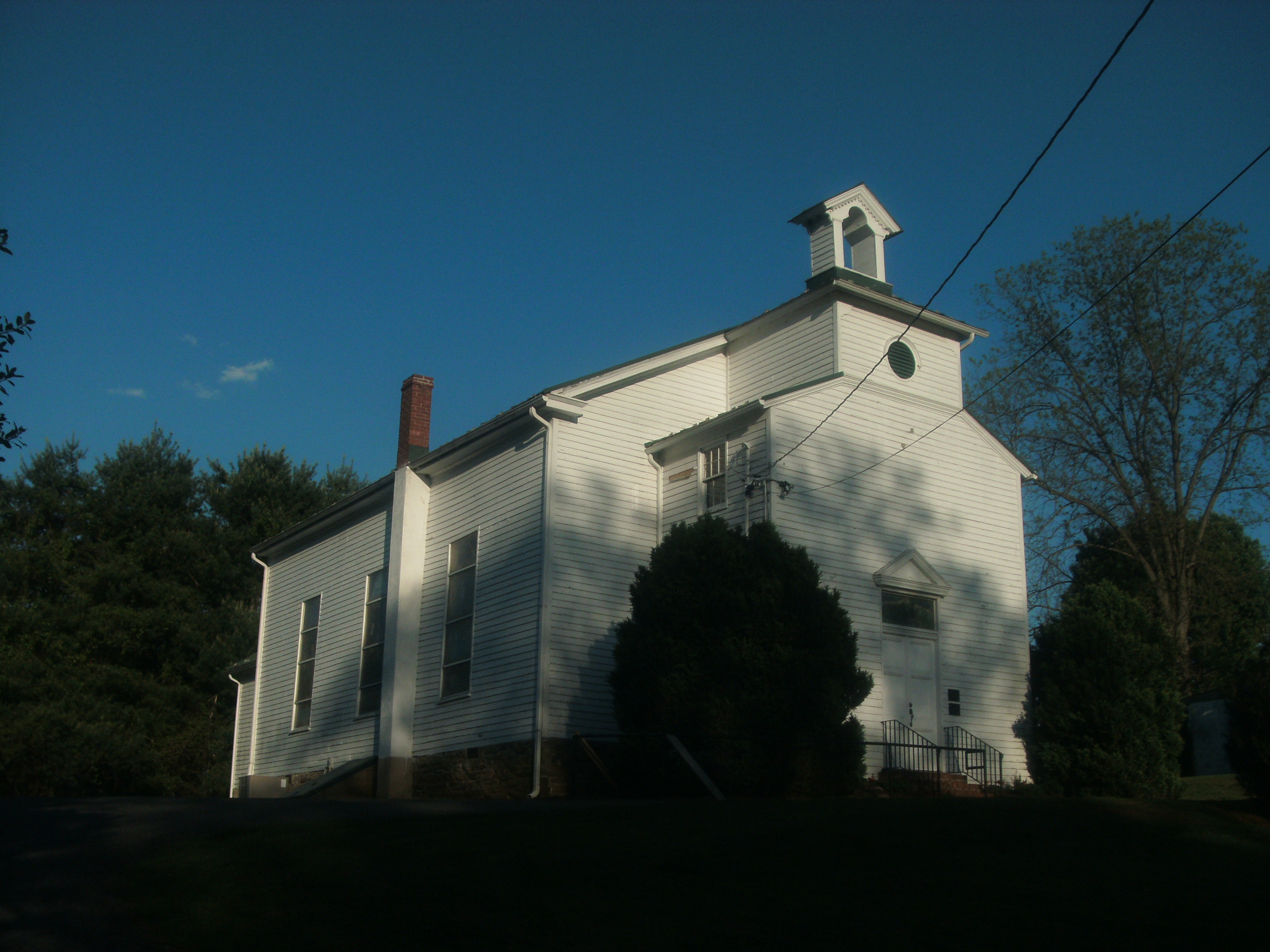
- Flint Hill Baptist Church in May, 2016

- Location within Virginia Location within the United States
- Location: 0.3 mi N of jct. of US 522 and VA 729, Flint Hill, Virginia
- Coordinates: 38°45′50″N 78°6′1″W
- Area: less than one acre
- Built: 1854
- Architectural style: Late Victorian
- Part of: Flint Hill Historic District (ID11001070)
- NRHP reference No.: 97001509
- VLR No.: 078-0066

Significant dates
- Added to NRHP: December 1, 1997
- Designated CP: January 27, 2012
- Designated VLR: July 2, 1997

Flint Hill Baptist Church is a historic Southern Baptist church in Flint Hill, Rappahannock County, Virginia. The original section was built in 1854 and expanded and remodeled in the 1890s in the Late Victorian style. The original section is a one-story, gable-roofed, frame-and-weatherboard rectangular structure. Later additions are the front entrance tower topped with a belfry and Sunday school rooms to the rear. It features six stained-glass windows. Also on the property is the contributing church cemetery. Among those buried in the churchyard is Confederate Private Albert Gallatin Willis, one of Mosby's Rangers and a seminarian who offered himself for execution in the place of a married comrade-in-arms; the grave is noted with a marker in the Civil War Trails series.

It was added to the National Register of Historic Places in 1997 and included in the Flint Hill Historic District in 2012.
