= Hawlin, Virginia =

Unincorporated community in Virginia, US

Coordinates: 38°35′44″N 78°12′29″W

Hawlin is an unincorporated community in Rappahannock County, in the U.S. state of Virginia.
