= Mount Salem Baptist Meetinghouse =

Historic church in Virginia, United States

- U.S. National Register of Historic Places
- Virginia Landmarks Register
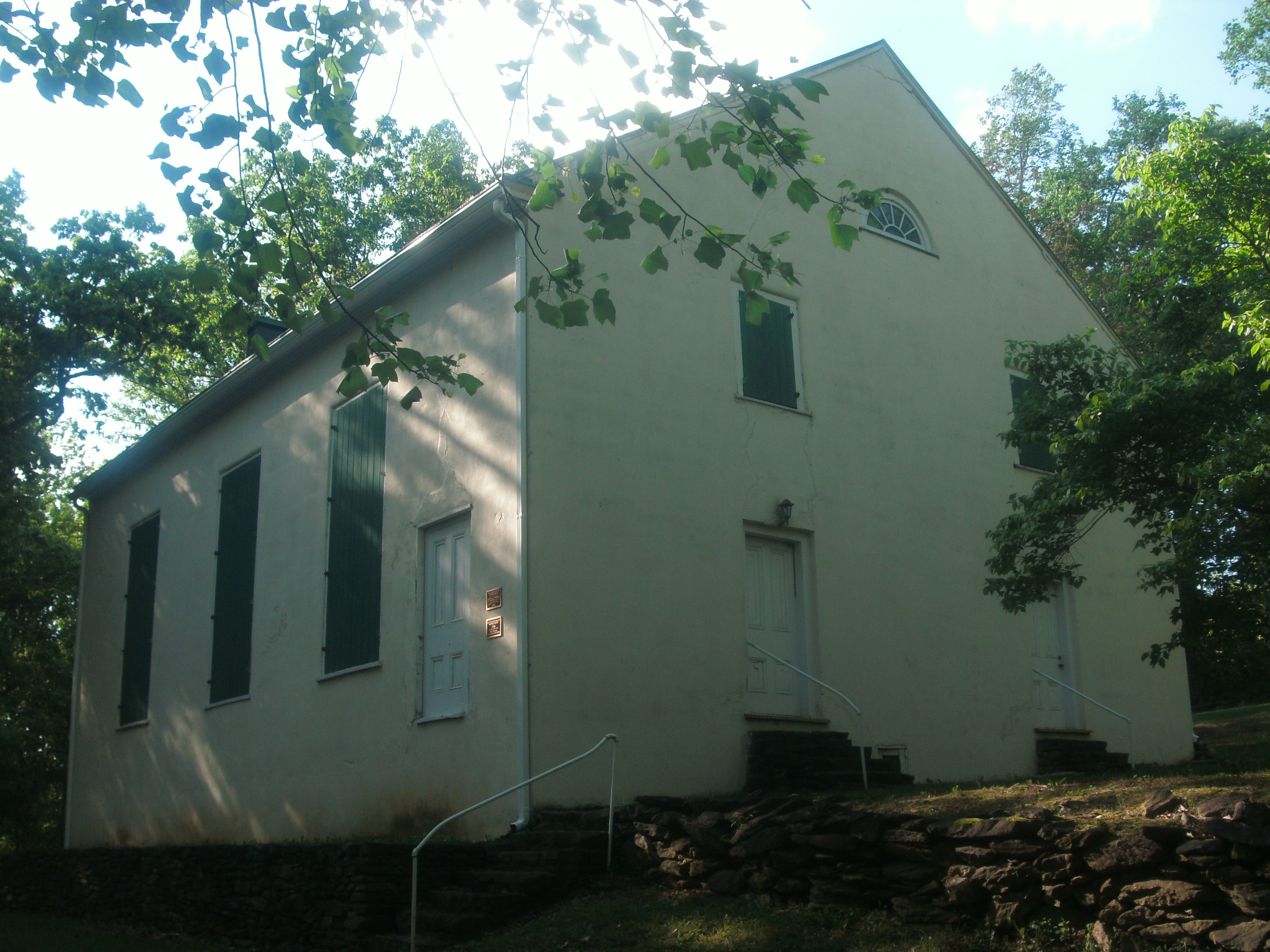
- Mount Salem Baptist Meetinghouse in May, 2016

- Location within Virginia Location within the United States
- Location: Southeast of Washington on VA 626, near Washington, Virginia
- Coordinates: 38°39′18″N 78°7′47″W
- Area: 1 acre (0.40 ha)
- Built: 1850-1851
- Built by: Miller, Henry
- Architectural style: Federal
- NRHP reference No.: 79003076
- VLR No.: 078-0033

Significant dates
- Added to NRHP: May 24, 1979
- Designated VLR: December 19, 1978

Mount Salem Baptist Meetinghouse, also known as Mount Salem Baptist Church, is a historic Baptist meeting house located near Washington, Rappahannock County, Virginia. It was built in 1850–1851, and is a one-story, stuccoed stone building. It measures 40 feet by 50 feet and is topped by a gable roof. The church was restored and put into active service in 1977, after closure in 1942.

It was added to the National Register of Historic Places in 1979.
