= Caledonia Farm =

Historic house in Virginia, United States

- U.S. National Register of Historic Places
- Virginia Landmarks Register
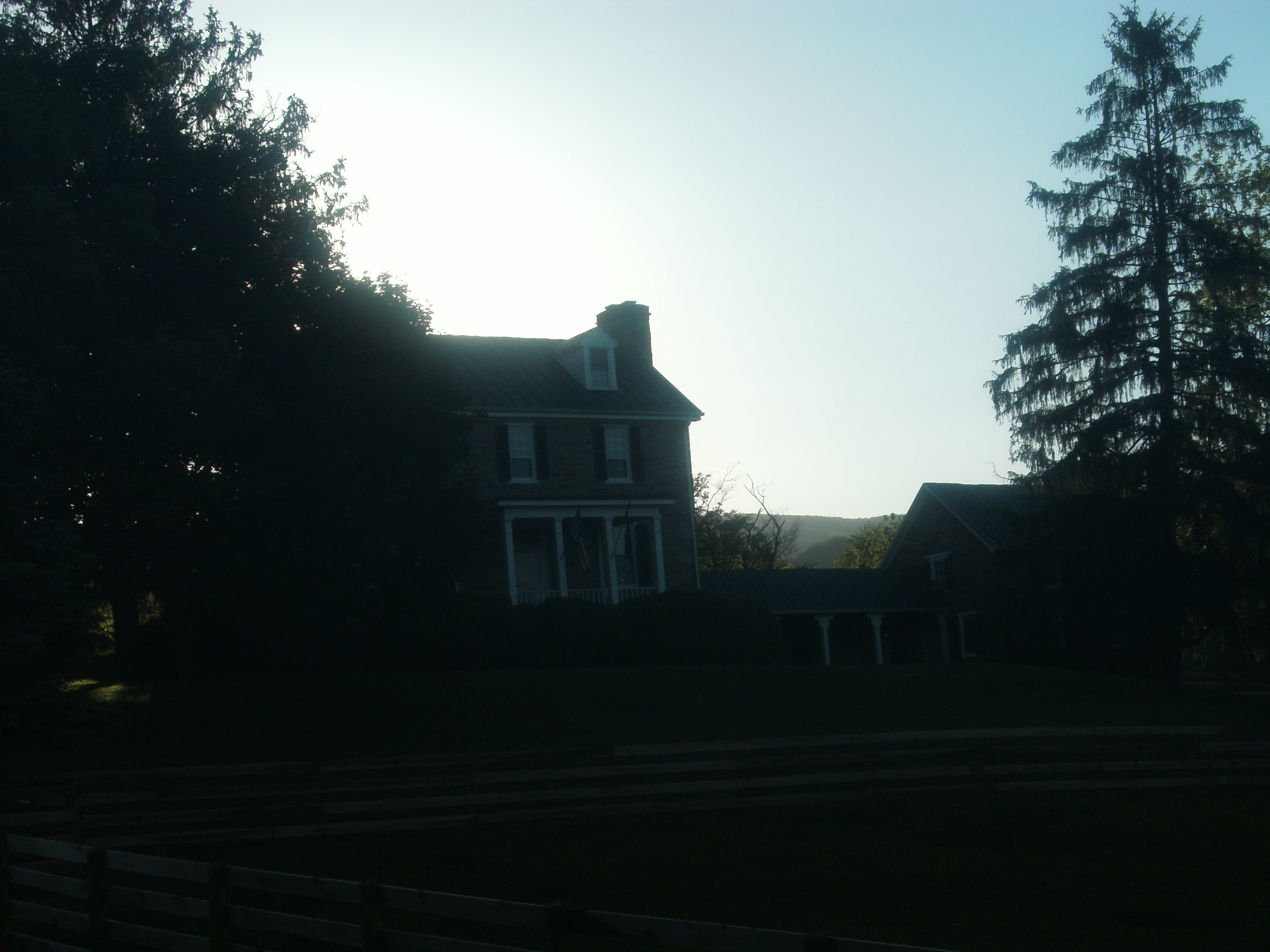
- Caledonia Farm at dusk, May, 2016

- Location within Virginia Location within the United States
- Location: Jct. of VA 628 and VA 606, Flint Hill, Virginia
- Coordinates: 38°45′44.6″N 78°7′37.7″W
- Area: 52 acres (21 ha)
- Built: c. 1812
- Architectural style: Federal
- NRHP reference No.: 90001996
- VLR No.: 078-0064

Significant dates
- Added to NRHP: December 28, 1990
- Designated VLR: June 19, 1990

Caledonia Farm, also known as Fountain Hall, is a historic home located at Flint Hill, Rappahannock County, Virginia. It was built about 1812, and is a two-story, three-bay, Federal style stone dwelling. The original stone kitchen was connected to the north end of the house in the 1960s. The property also includes the contributing Dearing family cemetery.

It was added to the National Register of Historic Places in 2004.
