= Boston, Culpeper and Rappahannock Counties, Virginia =

Unincorporated community in Virginia, United States

Boston, Virginia
- Unincorporated community
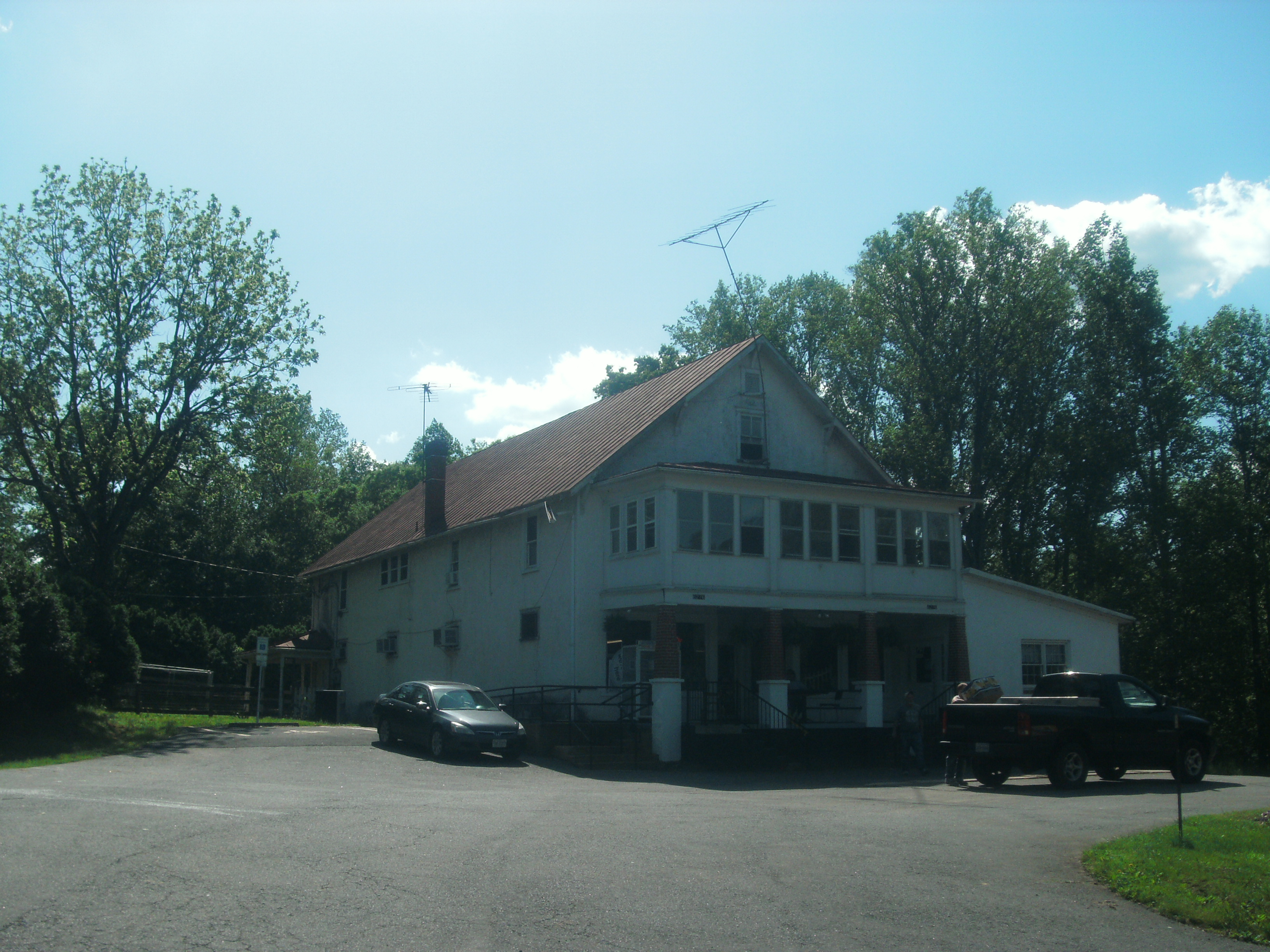
- Country store in Boston

- Location within Virginia Location within the United States
- Coordinates: 38°32′27″N 78°07′54″W
- Country: United States
- State: Virginia
- County: Culpeper and Rappahannock
- Elevation: 548 ft (167 m)
- Time zone: UTC-5 (Eastern (EST))
  - Summer (DST): UTC-4 (EDT)
- Area code: 540
- GNIS feature ID: 1477131

Boston is an unincorporated community straddling Culpeper County and Rappahannock County, Virginia, United States.

The George L. Carder House, which is located in nearby Castleton, Virginia, was added to the National Register of Historic Places in 1991.
