= Calvert Mill/Washington Mill =

- U.S. National Register of Historic Places
- Virginia Landmarks Register
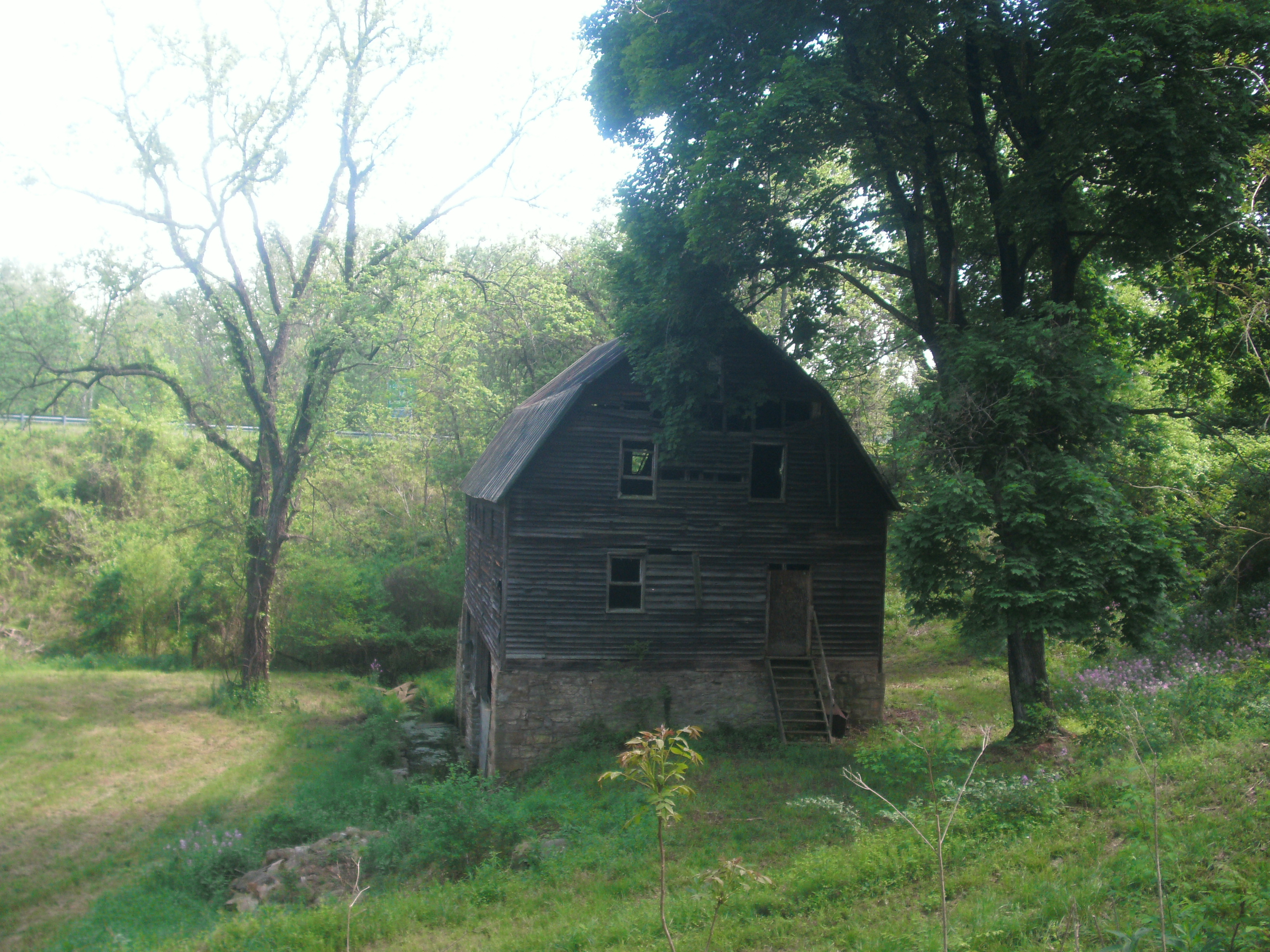
- Calvert Mill in May, 2016

- Location within Virginia Location within the United States
- Nearest city: Washington, Virginia
- Coordinates: 38°42′45″N 78°9′8″W
- Area: 4 acres (1.6 ha)
- Built: 1800
- NRHP reference No.: 82004583
- VLR No.: 078-0089

Significant dates
- Added to NRHP: September 02, 1982
- Designated VLR: November 18, 1980

The Calvert Mill/Washington Mill, also known as the Old Mill, is an historic water-powered grinding mill located on Old Mill Road in Washington, Virginia. Its water source is the Rush River. The Calvert name comes from George Calvert, Jr., a local landowner, who owned it from 1779 to 1800. The oldest part of the present mill dates from this period. Later additions were made in 1840 and 1860. It was bought in 1979 by Peter Kramer, who planned to restore it. As of 2008, though, it stood unused and in disrepair.

On September 2, 1982, it was added to the National Register of Historic Places.
