= Scrabble School =

- U.S. National Register of Historic Places
- Virginia Landmarks Register
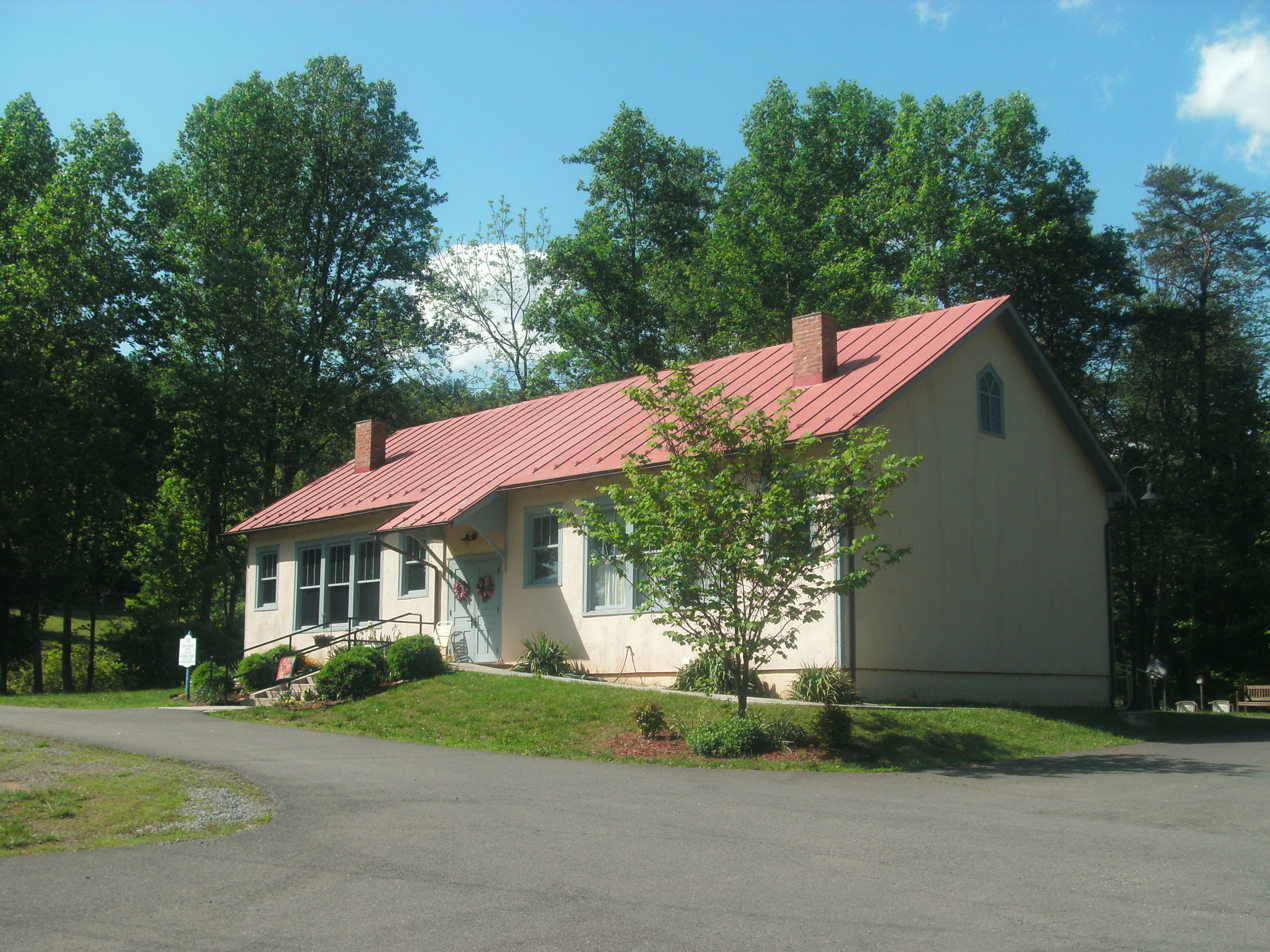
- Scrabble School in May, 2016

- Location within Virginia Location within the United States
- Location: 111 Scrabble Rd., Castleton, Virginia
- Coordinates: 38°35′2″N 78°8′58″W
- Area: 2.3 acres (0.93 ha)
- Built: 1921
- Architectural style: Bungalow/craftsman
- MPS: Rosenwald Schools in Virginia MPS
- NRHP reference No.: 07001143
- VLR No.: 078-5107

Significant dates
- Added to NRHP: October 31, 2007
- Designated VLR: September 5, 2007

Scrabble School is a historic Rosenwald school for African-American children located near Castleton, Rappahannock County, Virginia. It was built in 1921–1922, and is a one-story, wood-frame building clad in rough-cast stucco siding. The building sits on a poured concrete foundation. It features overhanging eaves, a wood cornice, exposed rafter tails, and decorative corner brackets in the American Craftsman style. Also on the property are the contributing concrete block coal house/shed (c. 1950) and septic tanks / privy sites (c. 1922). The school was permanently closed in 1968.

It was added to the National Register of Historic Places in 2007.
