= Castleton, Virginia =

Castleton
- Town
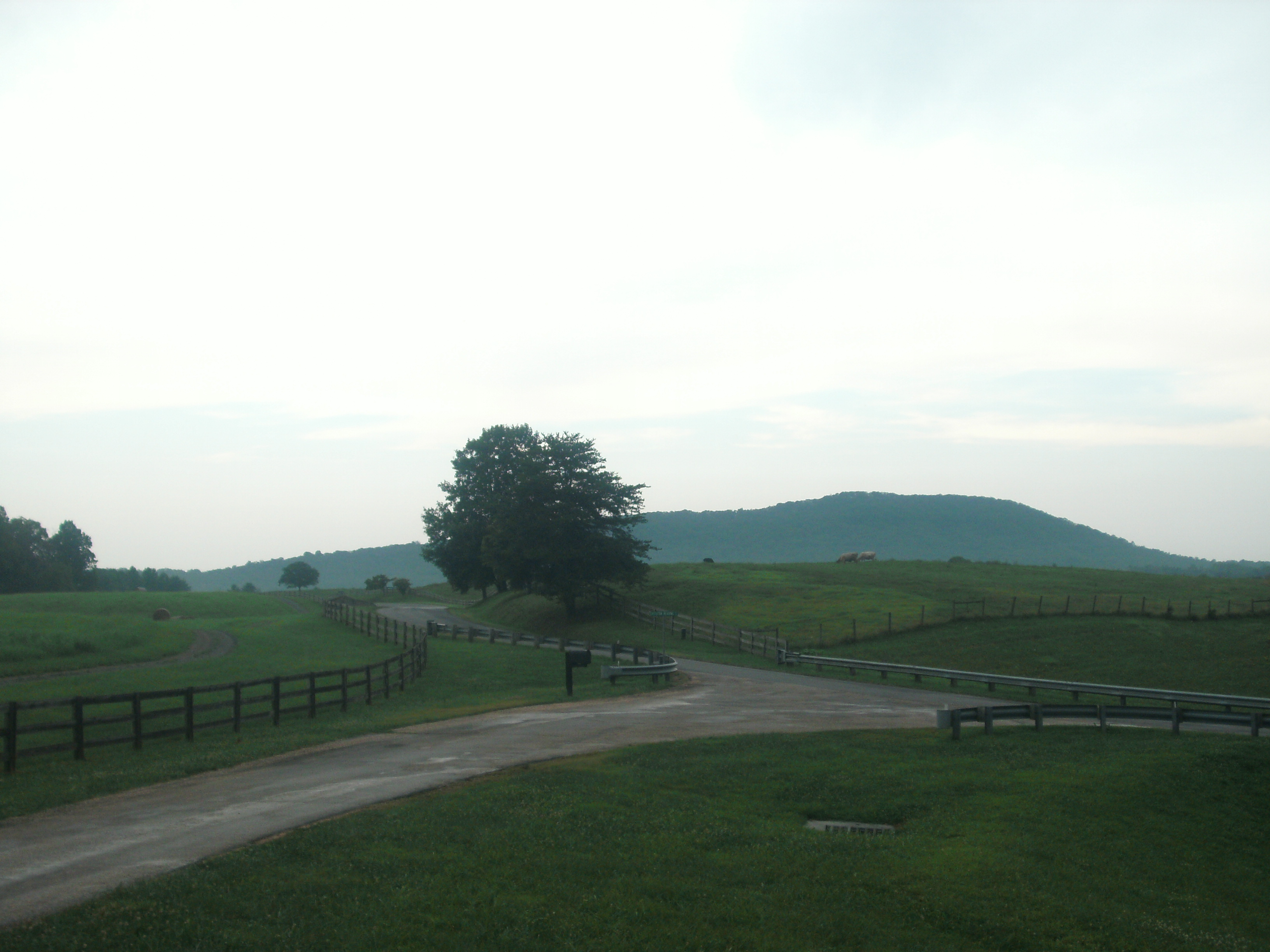
- A view from the entrance of the Castleton Festival

- Location within the Commonwealth of Virginia Castleton (the United States)
- Coordinates: 38°36′21.44″N 78°6′24″W
- Country: United States
- State: Virginia
- County: Rappahannock
- Elevation: 607 ft (185 m)
- Time zone: UTC-5 (Eastern (EST))
  - Summer (DST): UTC-4 (EDT)
- ZIP code: 22716
- Area code: 540
- GNIS feature ID: 1492725

Castleton is an unincorporated community in Rappahannock County in the U.S. state of Virginia. It is located northwest of Culpeper.

Location of Castleton within Rappahannock County

== Culture ==
Maestro Lorin Maazel maintained a 600-acre (2.4 km^{2}) estate in Castleton, and made it the focus of the Castleton Festival every summer.

The George L. Carder House and Scrabble School are listed on the National Register of Historic Places.

== Notable people ==
- Lorin Maazel (1930–2014); conductor, violinist and composer
- Dietlinde Turban (born 1957); actress and wife of Maazel
