= Ben Venue (Washington, Virginia) =

Historic house in Virginia, United States

- U.S. National Register of Historic Places
- U.S. Historic district – Contributing property
- Virginia Landmarks Register
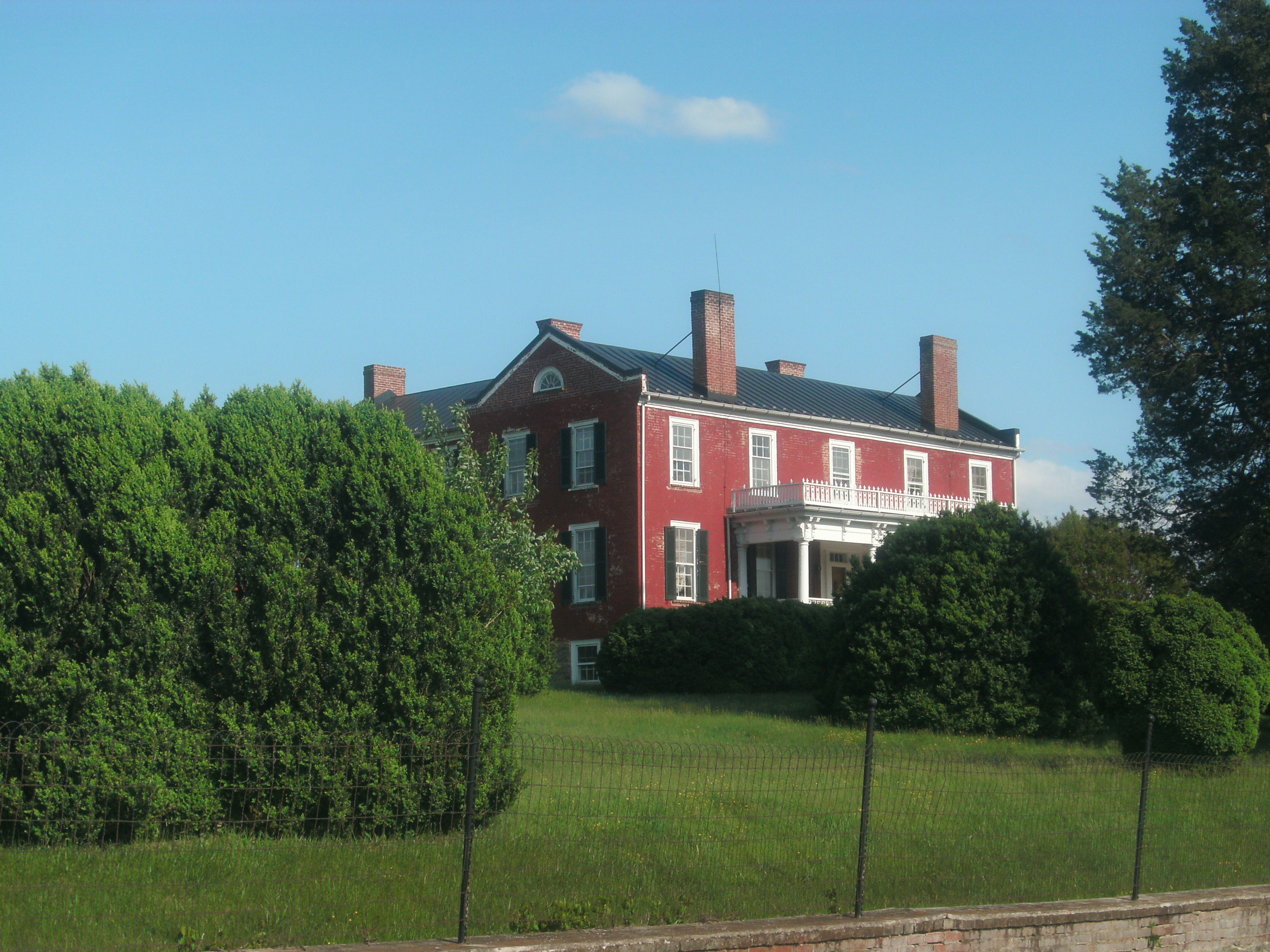
- Ben Venue in May, 2016

- Location within Virginia Location within the United States
- Location: Northeast of Washington on VA 729, near Washington, Virginia
- Coordinates: 38°43′18″N 78°03′51″W
- Area: 73 acres (30 ha)
- Built: 1844-1846
- Built by: Powers, James Leake
- Part of: Ben Venue Rural Historic District (ID15001042)
- NRHP reference No.: 79003075
- VLR No.: 078-0003

Significant dates
- Added to NRHP: December 28, 1979
- Designated CP: February 2, 2016
- Designated VLR: October 16, 1979

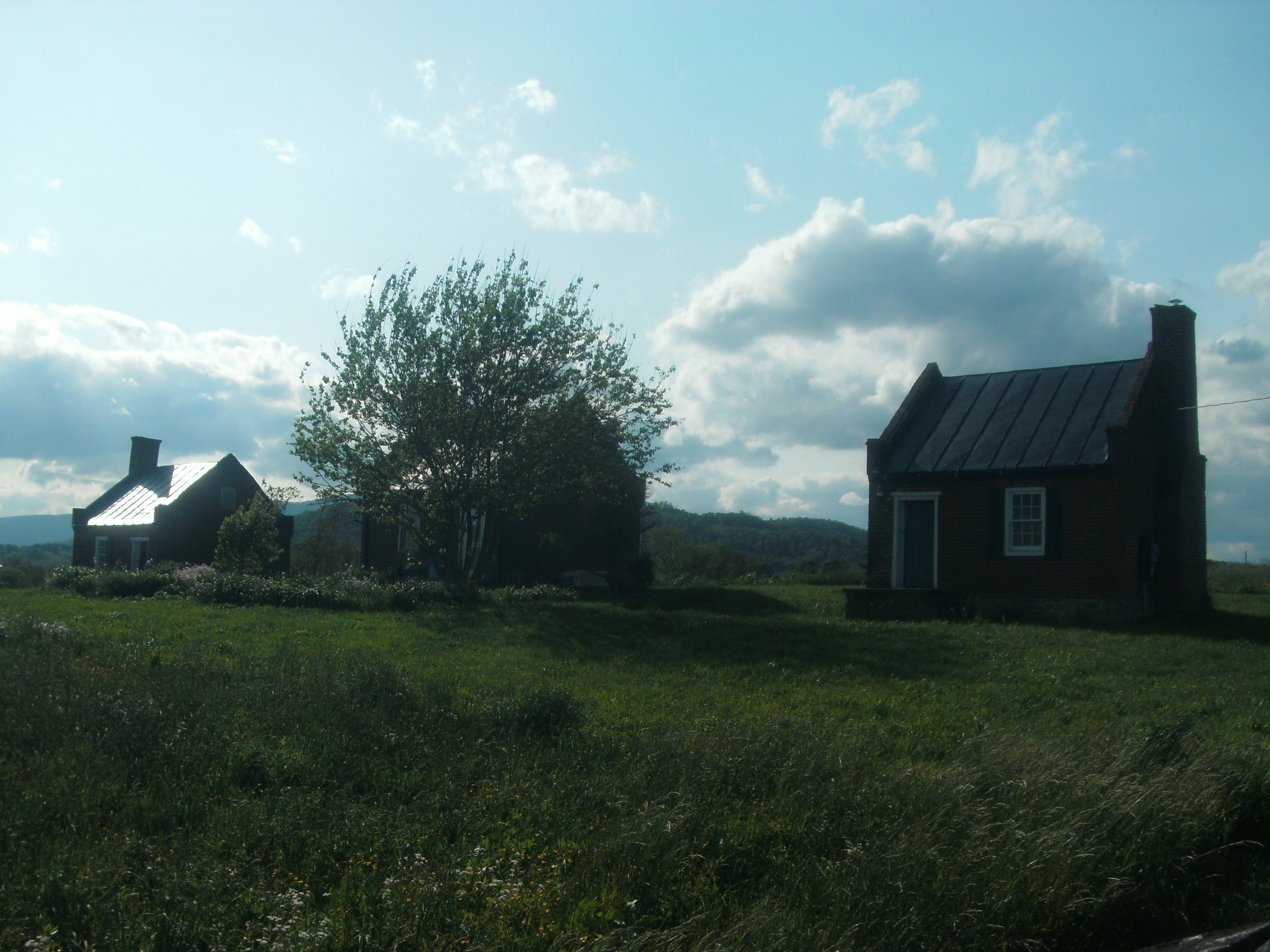
Brick slave cabins belonging to the property

Ben Venue is a historic home and farm located near Washington, Rappahannock County, Virginia. The main house was built between 1844 and 1846, and is a three-story, five-bay, brick dwelling with a side gable roof and parapets. It features a one-story porch that covers the central three bays; it has four Doric order columns supporting a bracketed entablature. The property also includes three brick slave cabins, the original Fletcher homestead, kitchen, smokehouse, privy, and a formal garden.

It was added to the National Register of Historic Places in 1979.
