= George L. Carder House =

Historic house in Virginia, United States

- U.S. National Register of Historic Places
- Virginia Landmarks Register
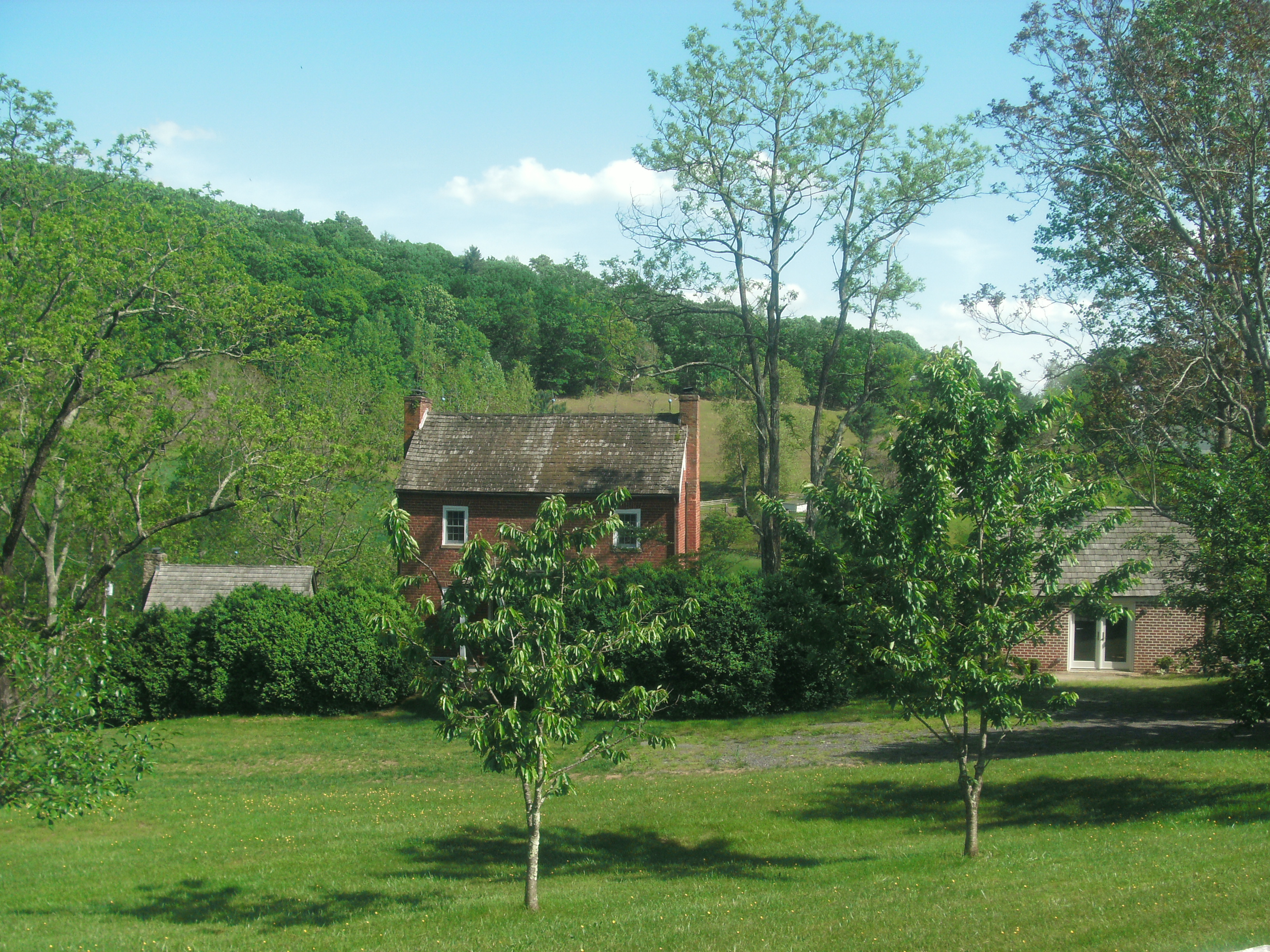
- The Carder House and outbuildings, May, 2016

- Location within Virginia Location within the United States
- Location: 456 Scrabble Rd., Castleton, Virginia
- Coordinates: 38°35′59″N 78°8′15″W
- Area: 4 acres (1.6 ha)
- Built: 1833
- Architectural style: Federal
- NRHP reference No.: 04000715
- VLR No.: 078-5078

Significant dates
- Added to NRHP: December 14, 2004
- Designated VLR: March 17, 2004

George L. Carder House, also known as Boxwood Hill, is a historic home located at Castleton, Rappahannock County, Virginia. It was built about 1833, and is a two-story, Federal-style brick dwelling on a limestone foundation. It features a pair of front entrances and an original kitchen built into the cellar. The property also includes a contributing one-room log house, log shed, and wood-framed barn.

It was added to the National Register of Historic Places in 2004.
