= Flint Hill, Rappahannock County, Virginia =

Flint Hill, Virginia
- Census-designated place (CDP)
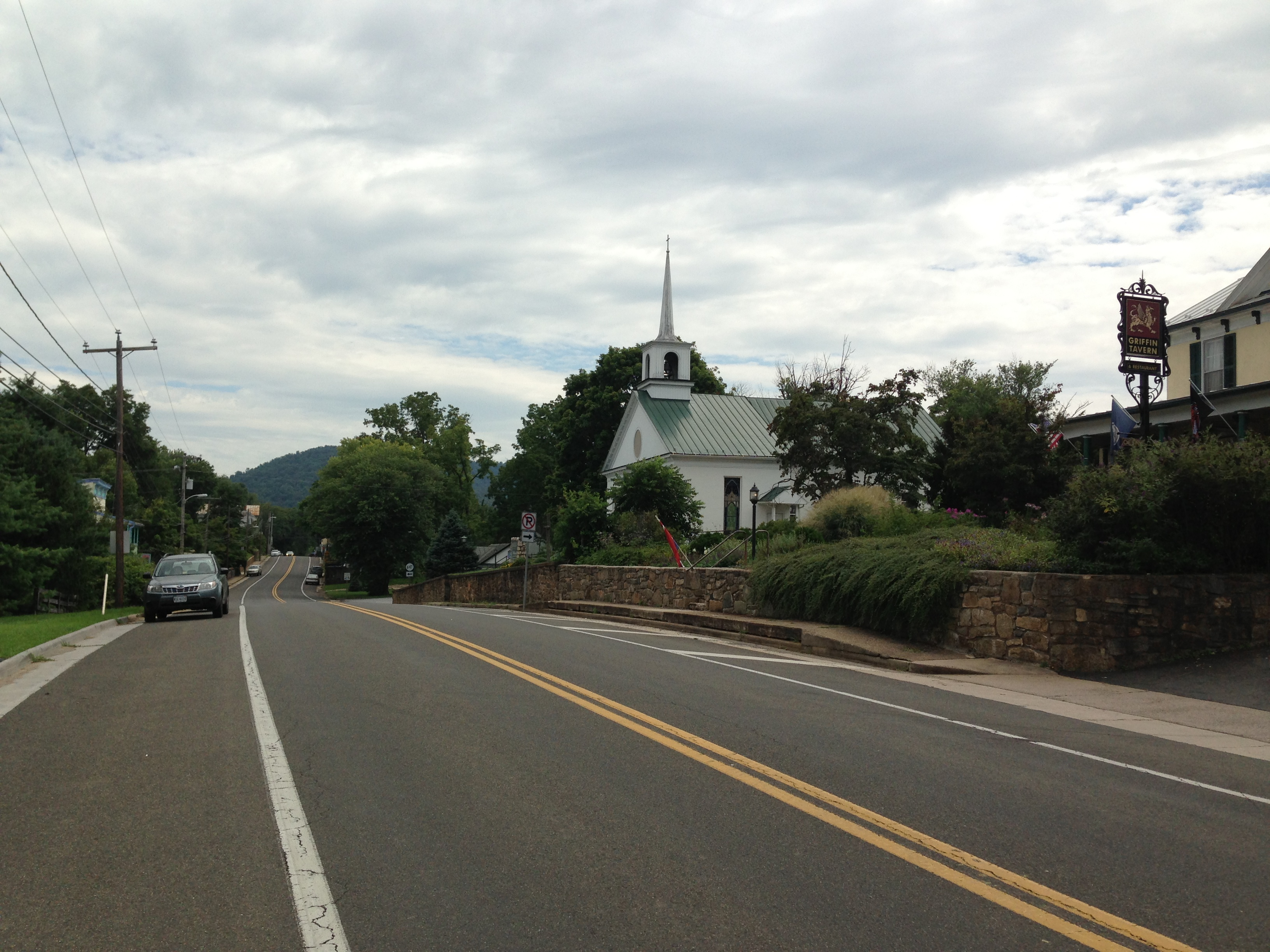
- A view of Flint Hill along Zachary Taylor Highway

- Location of the Flint Hill CDP within Rappahannock County

- Location within the Commonwealth of Virginia
- Coordinates: 38°46′2.76″N 78°5′1.46″W
- Country: United States
- State: Virginia
- County: Rappahannock

Population (2020 Census)
  - Total: 222
- Time zone: UTC-5 (Eastern (EST))
  - Summer (DST): UTC-4 (EDT)
- ZIP code: 22627
- Area code: 540
- FIPS code: 51-28496
- GNIS feature ID: 2629022

Flint Hill is a census-designated place (CDP) in Rappahannock County, Virginia, United States. The population as of the 2010 Census was 209. It is located on Route 522, approximately two miles to the east of the border of Shenandoah National Park.

The linear and compact-shaped village includes agricultural buildings, residential dwellings, churches, and schools, representing a variety of architectural designs such as Greek Revival, Italianate, Gothic Revival, Craftsman, and Federal.

Most of the village, including a two-mile stretch of Route 522 between Wilson Branch Creek and Ben Venue Road and portions of several side streets, was listed on the National Register of Historic Places in 2012 as the Flint Hill Historic District. Caledonia Farm and Flint Hill Baptist Church are also separately listed on the National Register of Historic Places. Just to the north of the village is the campus of Wakefield Country Day School, a private school founded in 1972 that serves Rappahannock County and the surrounding community.

== History ==
The history of Flint Hill can be traced back to the year 1740, where it started out as a crossroads community. It then became an official census-designated place in 1843 by a General Assembly act. The community became a thriving regional village during the late 1800s/early 1900s, which it is still today. Flint Hill became a registered historic place in 2012.

== Demographics ==
Historical population
Census	Pop.	Note	%±
2010	209		—
2020	222		6.2%
U.S. Decennial Census; 2010 2020

Flint Hill was first listed as a census designated place in the 2010 U.S. census.
