= Battle of Mile Hill =

Battle of the American Civil War

- Part of the American Civil War
Date	September 2, 1862
Location	Loudoun County, Virginia 39.14°N 77.55°W
Result	Confederate victory

Belligerents
United States (Union)	CSA (Confederacy)

Commanders and leaders
Henry A. Cole; Samuel C. Means	Thomas T. Munford

Units involved
Cole's Maryland Cavalry; Loudoun Rangers	2nd Virginia Cavalry

Strength
180	163

Casualties and losses
7 killed 33 wounded 15 captured	1 killed 6 wounded
- Location of the battle in Virginia

The Battle of Mile Hill was a cavalry skirmish during the American Civil War, that took place just north of Leesburg, Virginia, on September 2, 1862. It preceded the occupation of the town by the Army of Northern Virginia just prior to its crossing of the Potomac River starting the Maryland Campaign.

Confederate cavalry under Col. Thomas T. Munford surprised and routed the Federal force of Cole's Maryland Cavalry and the independent Loudoun Rangers. The engagement successfully cleared the area of Federal forces, allowing Robert E. Lee and the Army of Northern Virginia to occupy the town two days later on September 4, before crossing the Potomac north of town on September 6.

== Background ==
After the failure of Army of Northern Virginia to deliver a decisive blow to the Army of Virginia at the Battle of Chantilly following the Second Battle of Bull Run, Robert E. Lee decided it unwise to pursue the Federals any further towards their fortifications near Washington D.C. Instead, he planned to move into Loudoun County to obtain forage and provisions and to reorganize the army before his planned invasion of Maryland.

At the time, Loudoun County was occupied by Federal troops operating from the Union garrison at Harpers Ferry. As such, J.E.B. Stuart's cavalry was sent in advance to screen the army's movements and to clear Loudoun of enemy resistance. To this end, on September 1, the 2nd Virginia Cavalry, under the command of Col. Thomas T. Munford, was assigned to secure the town of Leesburg and the river crossings in its vicinity.

== Battle ==
The following day, as Munford approached the eastern end of Leesburg, he split his command, sending a squadron under the command of Captain Jesse Irvine, Jr. directly through town, while he, with the rest of his regiment turned north off the Leesburg Pike (present day Route 7) towards the Edward's Ferry river crossing.

Irvine and his command rushed into town to find Samuel C. Means and his Unionist Loudoun Rangers guarding the courthouse. The Rangers, having been severely manhandled by E.V. White and his partisan Rebels a few days prior at Waterford, put up little resistance before retreating north up King Street (Route 15), though not before suffering four wounded. The Rangers fell back on Cole's Maryland Cavalry, who were positioned to the north of town at the Big Spring (near present-day Tutt Lane), with Irvine's command in hot pursuit. Cole's dismounted command began to engage Irvine, but moments later Munford's command attacked from their rear flank, having been able to circumvent the Union position by riding around its left flank along the river and approaching its rear via Smart's Mill Lane, which Cole had foolishly left unguarded.

Cole attempted to mount his command to engage Munford, but many of his troops were killed or wounded before they could reach their horses. Those that did, briefly engaged Munford before retreating towards the Catoctin Mountain and the road to Waterford, which cut through a gap in the ridge. Munford gave chase for two miles, driving the Federals through the gap into Loudoun Valley before retiring, having successfully cleared Leesburg and the river crossings in its vicinity.

== Results ==
Of Munford's 163 troops on the field, he suffered 2 killed and 5 wounded, while of the Loudoun Rangers 30 or so men, 1 was killed, 6 were wounded and 4 captured. Cole's Cavalry, estimated at 150 strong, reported 6 killed, 27 wounded, and 11 captured, though a significant number of those casualties were officers.

== Battlefield ==
The main portion of the battle started approximately where the present day U.S. Rt. 15 Bypass converges with Business Rt. 15 near the Harrison Farm (this being Cole's initial position). The battle then moved southwest across present day Morven Park and Ida Lee Park to Old Waterford Road. None of the battlefield is protected as such, but Morvin Park remains undeveloped, as does much of Ida Lee Park, so if one follows the Civil War Trails signs to the historical marker off of Tutts Lane, a good feel for the setting of the battle can be had.

Cole's initial position has been mostly obliterated by construction and widening of the Rt 15 highway system, as well as the partial condemnation of the Harrison Farm by the public school system to build Smart's Mill Middle School and Frances Hazel Reid Elementary School. Likewise, the approach Munford took up Smart's Mill Lane has become a housing development, though a piece of the old road survives within the modern subdivision.
