= Loudoun Heights, Virginia =

Unincorporated community in Virginia, United States

- Unincorporated community
- Location within Northern Virginia Location within Virginia Location within the United States
- Coordinates: 39°18′47″N 77°43′4″W
- Country: United States
- State: Virginia
- County: Loudoun
- Time zone: UTC−5 (Eastern (EST))
  - Summer (DST): UTC−4 (EDT)

Loudoun Heights is an unincorporated community in Loudoun County, Virginia, United States, near Purcellville and Harpers Ferry, West Virginia. It is located in the Between the Hills region of the county along Harpers Ferry Road (VA 671) and is bounded to its northwest and northeast by the Harpers Ferry National Historical Park on the Potomac River. The Blue Ridge and Short Hill Mountain border it to the west and east.

Loudoun Heights overlooks Harper's Ferry, the steep bluff providing a clear view of the Shenandoah River below. Today the area is known for its recreational activities and challenging hiking trails.

== History ==
This high ground was occupied by Confederate general John George Walker during the Battle of Harpers Ferry, September 12–15, 1862. Loudoun Heights was also the site of a night attack made on January 10, 1864, by Col. John S. Mosby's Rangers against Major Henry A. Cole's 1st Potomac Home Brigade Maryland Volunteer Cavalry. Mosby's attack failed and ended a long run of engagements between Mosby's Rangers and Cole's cavalry.

== See also ==
- Loudoun Heights (mountain)
