= Point of Rocks, Maryland =

- Census-designated place
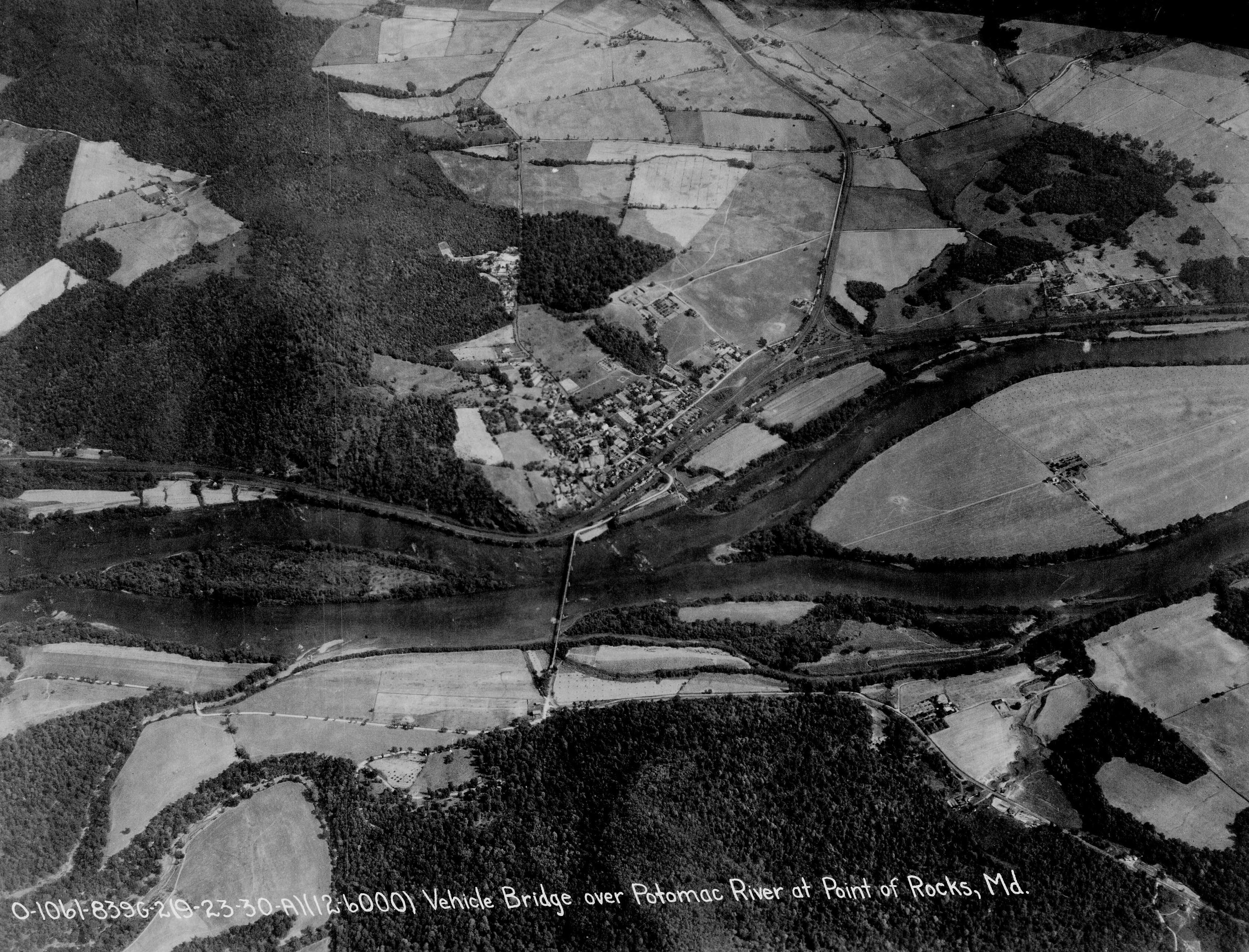
- Aerial image, 1930

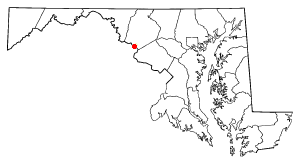
- Location of Point of Rocks in Maryland
- Coordinates: 39°16′42″N 77°31′45″W
- Country: United States
- State: Maryland
- County: Frederick

Area
  - Total: 1.13 sq mi (2.92 km^{2})
  - Land: 1.13 sq mi (2.92 km^{2})
  - Water: 0 sq mi (0.00 km^{2})
- Elevation: 276 ft (84 m)

Population (2020)
  - Total: 1,886
  - Density: 1,675.7/sq mi (646.99/km^{2})
- Time zone: UTC−5 (Eastern (EST))
  - Summer (DST): UTC−4 (EDT)
- ZIP Code: 21777
- Area codes: 301, 240
- FIPS code: 24-62575
- GNIS feature ID: 2583673

Point of Rocks is an unincorporated community and census-designated place (CDP) in Frederick County, Maryland. As of the 2010 census, it had a population of 1,466.

Point of Rocks is named for a rock formation on the adjacent Catoctin Mountain, which was formed by the Potomac River cutting through the ridge in a water gap, a typical formation in the Appalachian Mountains. The formation is not visible from the town and can only be seen from boats on the river, or in Loudoun County, Virginia, from the southern bank of the river.

== History ==
=== Pre-settlement ===
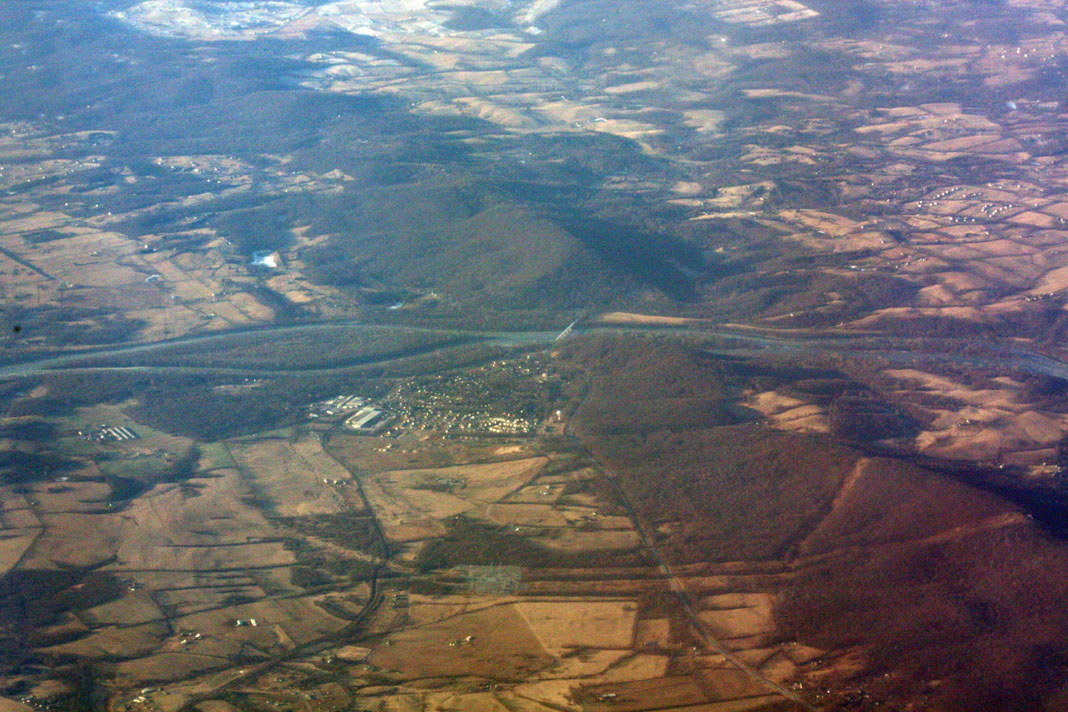
An aerial view of Point of Rocks

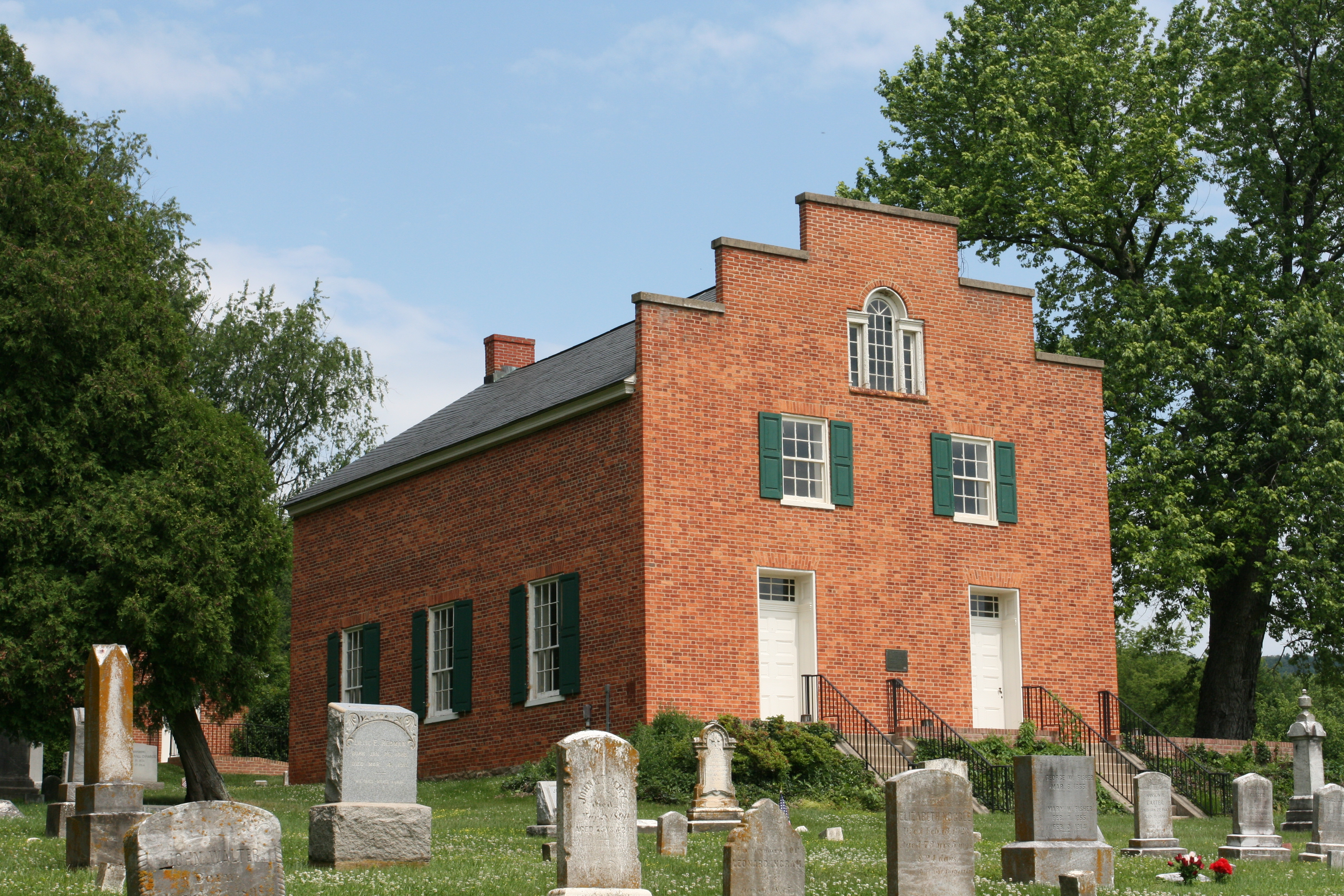
Historic St. Paul's Episcopal Church, built in 1841 by enslaved men and women of the Duval Plantation and consecrated in 1843, is now listed on the National Register of Historic Places.

Indigenous peoples inhabited the Point of Rocks regions for centuries prior to European colonization. The Piscataway were one of the indigenous cultures to live in Point of Rocks, inhabiting an island in the Potomac River known today as Heater's Island. Eventually, conflicts with neighboring tribes and European settlers forced the migration of the Piscataway from their ancestral homelands of Prince George's County to Heater's Island around 1699, though their population was severely decreased by an outbreak of smallpox in 1704.

The Piscataways remained on the island for a few more years before migrating north into Pennsylvania and New York.

About a decade after the Piscataway abandoned their settlement on Heater's Island, the first European settler in Point of Rocks, Arthur Nelson, received a patent for a tract of land called "Nelson's Island." The Nelson Family retained their status as prominent landholders in Point of Rocks in the early-18th century, developing several plantations on which tobacco was grown. Commercial interests in the region led the Nelsons to petition for a road to be built connecting Frederick and "Nelson's Ferry," the first English-language name assigned to the village that became Point of Rocks. This road was eventually constructed and became known as Ballenger Creek Pike.

=== 19th and 20th centuries ===
In the early-19th century, the arrival of the Chesapeake and Ohio (C&O) Canal and the Baltimore and Ohio (B&O) Railroad led to an increase in settlement and industry in the Point of Rocks area. The village became a temporary terminus for both the C&O Canal and the B&O Railroad in 1828 when the companies went to court to determine which would control the right of way through the narrow passage between the Potomac River and Catoctin Mountain immediately west of Point of Rocks. After six years of court battles, the companies agreed to compromise and share the right of way, the B&O Railroad eventually constructing a tunnel through the mountain to broaden its lines through the narrow water gap.

With the construction of the C&O Canal and the B&O Railroad and its strategic location on the Potomac River, Point of Rocks was poised to become a regional transportation hub and center of industrial activity. In 1835, Charles Johnson, the owner of the land on which Point of Rocks was built, had lots surveyed and streets laid out for a new town.

From the earliest days of European settlement in Point of Rocks, forced labor through indentured servitude and enslavement of African Americans drove the local economy. Tobacco plantations in the fertile lands of the lower Monocacy Valley were operated based on the labor of enslaved men and women. The plantation owners also used their slaves to build houses, places of business, and public buildings, such as St. Paul's Episcopal Church, completed in 1841 using the labor of enslaved men and women from the Duval Plantation. Nearby Licksville, a small community located near Noland's Ferry crossing the Potomac River was the site of an active slave market.

==== American Civil War ====
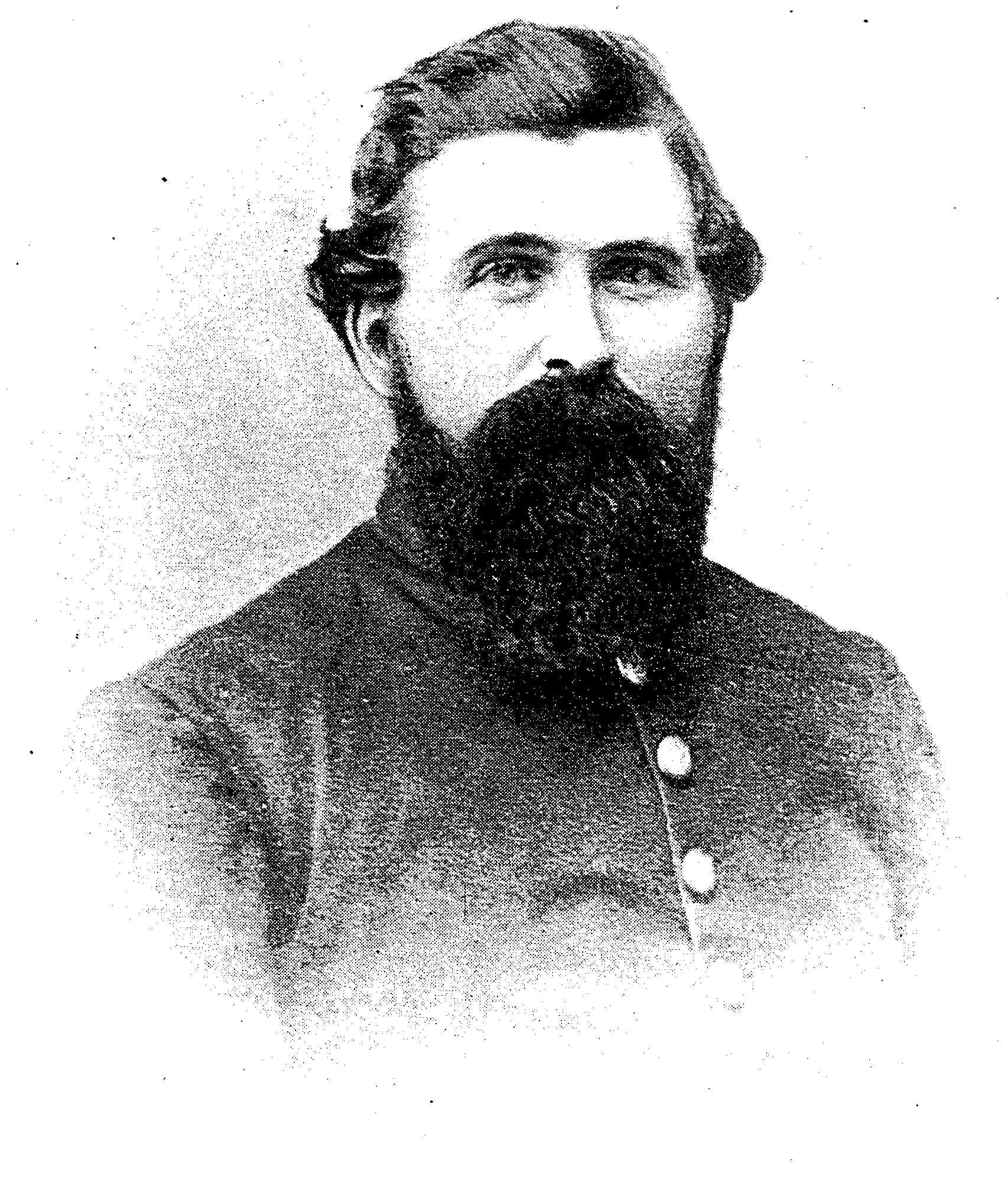
Captain Samuel C. Means, who organized the Union Army-aligned Loudoun Rangers

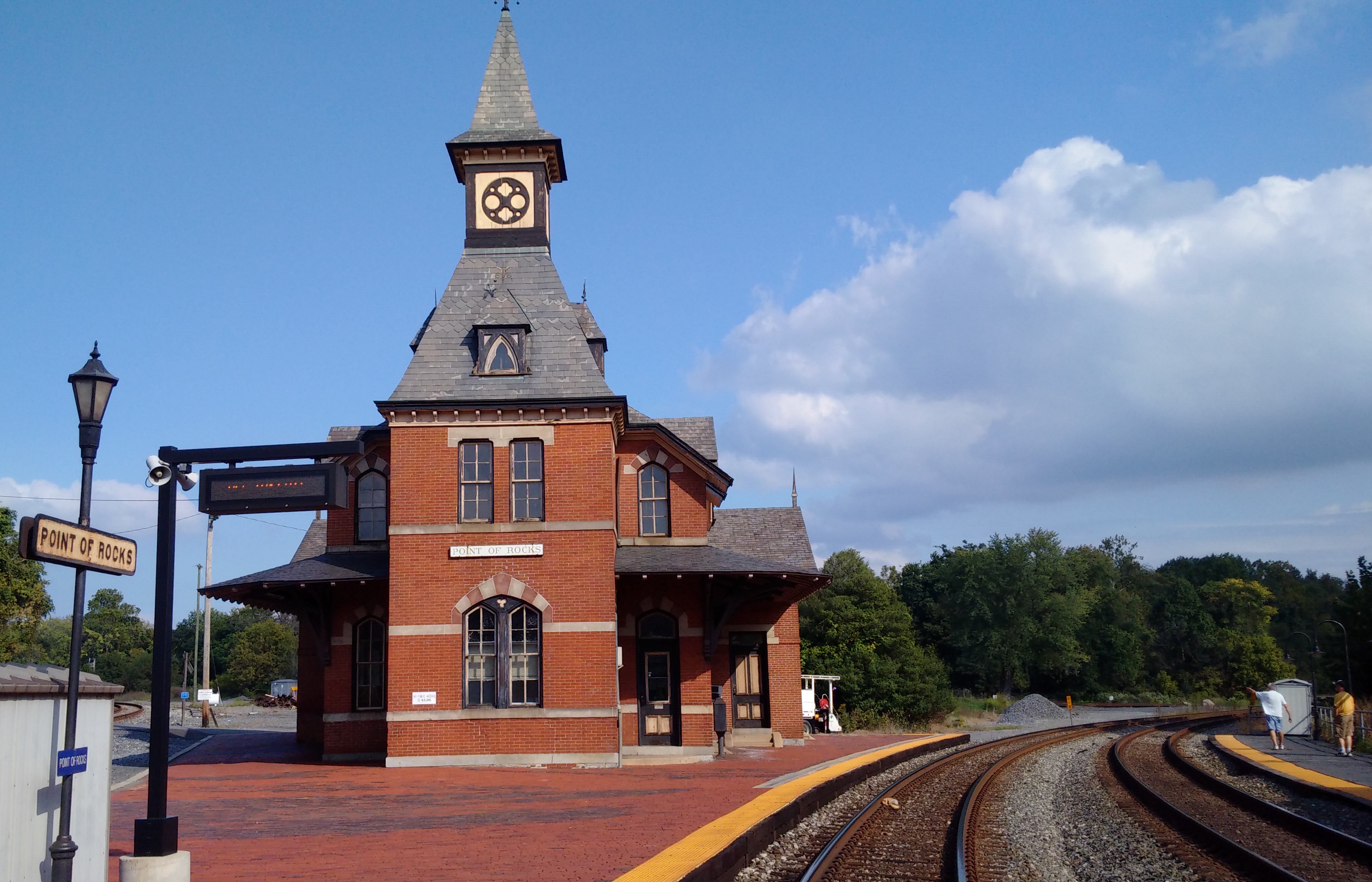
Point of Rocks railroad station, built by the Baltimore and Ohio Railroad in 1873

Situated on the state line between Maryland and the seceded state of Virginia, Point of Rocks was the site of several small skirmishes and military actions during the Civil War. The B&O Railroad and C&O Canal were important targets for Confederate raiders across the Potomac River. In 1861, then Colonel Thomas J. "Stonewall" Jackson led a raid at Point of Rocks, shutting off the rail lines east of the town and capturing 56 locomotives and 300 rail cars.

Neighboring Loudoun County, Virginia, was home to several small pockets of Union supporters, including Quakers who lived in villages like Waterford and Lincoln who did not support secession or the Confederate cause for defending the institution of slavery. Point of Rocks became a haven for those families who were forced to flee Virginia.

In 1862, Captain Samuel C. Means, a native of Waterford, Virginia, but then living in Point of Rocks where he was a merchant and B&O Railroad station manager, raised a cavalry unit called the Loudoun Rangers, the only organized unit from Virginia to fight for the Union. The Loudoun Rangers spent most of 1862 and 1863 fighting alongside Cole's Maryland Cavalry (the First Potomac Home Brigade) to protect the C&O Canal and the B&O Railroad from frequent Confederate raids. Cole's Maryland Cavalry encamped at Point of Rocks, occupying St. Paul's Episcopal Church where they burned the interior furnishings.

Lt. Col. John S. Mosby and his 43rd Battalion of Virginia Cavalry, known as "Mosby's Raiders", crossed the Potomac and attacked Union garrison forces at Point of Rocks in 1864 in a brief campaign called the "Calico Raid." The area was also the scene of military maneuvers and brief skirmishes during Valley Campaigns of 1864 and the Battle of Monocacy on July 9, 1864.

After the Civil War, Point of Rocks remained a place of conflict. In 1879, James Carroll was lynched in Point of Rocks after being accused of breaking into the home of Richard Thomas and raping his wife. Having fled down the C&O Canal towpath to Georgetown, Carroll was apprehended on April 16, 1879. While being transported to Frederick for trial, a mob swarmed the train as it approached the station in Point of Rocks, removed Carroll from police custody, and hanged him in an adjacent field. The death of Carroll, whose alleged crimes have never been proven or disproven, was one of three recorded lynchings to take place in Frederick County.

In 1873, the B&O Railroad opened its Metropolitan Branch, connecting Washington D.C. to its Old Main Line in a junction at Point of Rocks. A new station, which has become a noted town landmark, was erected the same year. The Gothic Revival styled brick building was designed by E. Francis Baldwin and is situated in the center of the junction of the two lines.

Several other prominent structures were built in the town during the Victorian era, including the town's Methodist Church (1894), Holy Trinity Episcopal Church (1887, replaced in 1912), St. Luke's Lutheran Church (1889), and Masonic Temple (1898).

=== 21st century ===
In 2001, Duke Energy filed an application with the Maryland Public Service Commission to construct a power plant on the north edge of town. In November 2002, however, Duke officially canceled its proposal, though it retains property in the area.

The Point of Rocks railroad station was listed on the National Register of Historic Places in 1973, and St. Paul's Episcopal Church was listed in 1978.

==== Flooding ====
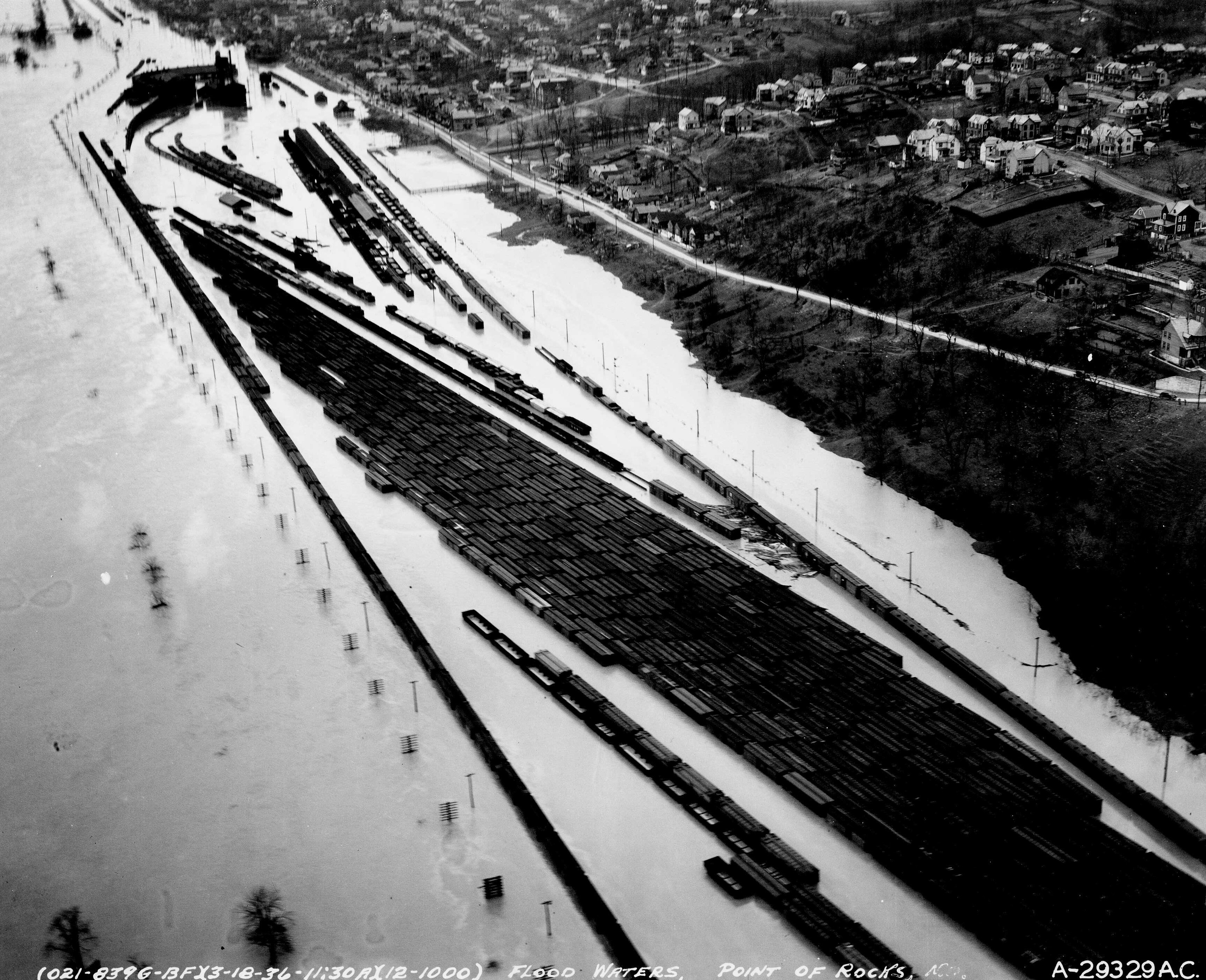
Flooded rail yard, 1945

Older portions of the town are on the Potomac River floodplain and have been repeatedly inundated. An ongoing Federal Emergency Management Agency program to reduce flood insurance payouts has resulted in the purchase and demolition of a large portion of structures on the lowest-lying properties.

== Geography ==
Point of Rocks is located in southern Frederick County, on the north bank of the Potomac River, and is bordered to the west by U.S. Route 15, which here runs along the eastern base of Catoctin Mountain. Via US 15 it is 13 miles (21 km) north to Frederick, the county seat, and 12 miles (19 km) south across the Potomac River to Leesburg, Virginia, and onwards to Washington Dulles Airport (IAD) which is the nearest major airport to Point of Rocks.

Other close settlements to Point of Rocks include nearby Adamstown, and Lucketts, VA which are both 5 miles (8.0 km) away to the east and south, respectively.

Maryland Route 28 leads east from Point of Rocks through rural Frederick County and Montgomery County 29 miles (47 km) to Rockville. According to the U.S. Census Bureau, Point of Rocks has a total area of 1.10 square miles (2.85 km^{2}), all land.

== Demographics ==
Historical population
Census	Pop.	Note	%±
2010	1,466		—
2020	1,886		28.6%
U.S. Decennial Census

=== 2020 census ===
As of the 2020 census, Point of Rocks had a population of 1,886. The median age was 39.2 years. 27.7% of residents were under the age of 18 and 10.6% of residents were 65 years of age or older. For every 100 females there were 96.9 males, and for every 100 females age 18 and over there were 94.3 males age 18 and over.

0.0% of residents lived in urban areas, while 100.0% lived in rural areas.

There were 626 households in Point of Rocks, of which 39.6% had children under the age of 18 living in them. Of all households, 69.6% were married-couple households, 11.8% were households with a male householder and no spouse or partner present, and 13.7% were households with a female householder and no spouse or partner present. About 13.5% of all households were made up of individuals and 5.3% had someone living alone who was 65 years of age or older.

There were 649 housing units, of which 3.5% were vacant. The homeowner vacancy rate was 2.0% and the rental vacancy rate was 7.1%.

Racial composition as of the 2020 census
Race	Number	Percent
White	1,512	80.2%
Black or African American	100	5.3%
American Indian and Alaska Native	1	0.1%
Asian	43	2.3%
Native Hawaiian and Other Pacific Islander	3	0.2%
Some other race	56	3.0%
Two or more races	171	9.1%
Hispanic or Latino (of any race)	155	8.2%

== Infrastructure ==
=== Transportation ===
The community contains the Point of Rocks Bridge of U.S. Route 15 over the Potomac River into Virginia. The bridge is the first such crossing of the river upstream of the American Legion Memorial Bridge on I-495 in Montgomery County.

Rail service through Point of Rocks began with the 1834 opening of the Baltimore and Ohio Railroad's main line, which ended at the next stop in Sandy Hook, Maryland, before the Harpers Ferry Crossing across the Potomac and into Virginia opened in 1839.

Point of Rocks is a passenger station stop on the MARC Brunswick Line. The station, designed by Ephraim Francis Baldwin, was built by the Baltimore and Ohio (B&O) Railroad and completed in 1876. Marking the junction between CSX's Metropolitan Subdivision (the current main line) and the Old Main Line Subdivision, it remains one of the former B&O's signature landmarks, and is a popular subject of railroad photography.

== Education ==
It is in Frederick County Public Schools.

School zoning is as follows: Valley Elementary School, Brunswick Middle School, Brunswick High School.

== Notable person ==
- Craig Davis, author and international development expert

== See also ==
- Loudoun County in the American Civil War
