= Virts =

Virts is a surname. Notable people with the surname include:

- C. Clifton Virts (1910–1985), American politician and lawyer from Maryland
- Terry W. Virts (born 1967), American astronaut

== See also ==
- William Virts House
- Virt (disambiguation)
