= Battle of White Oak Swamp =

Battle in the American Civil War

- Part of the American Civil War
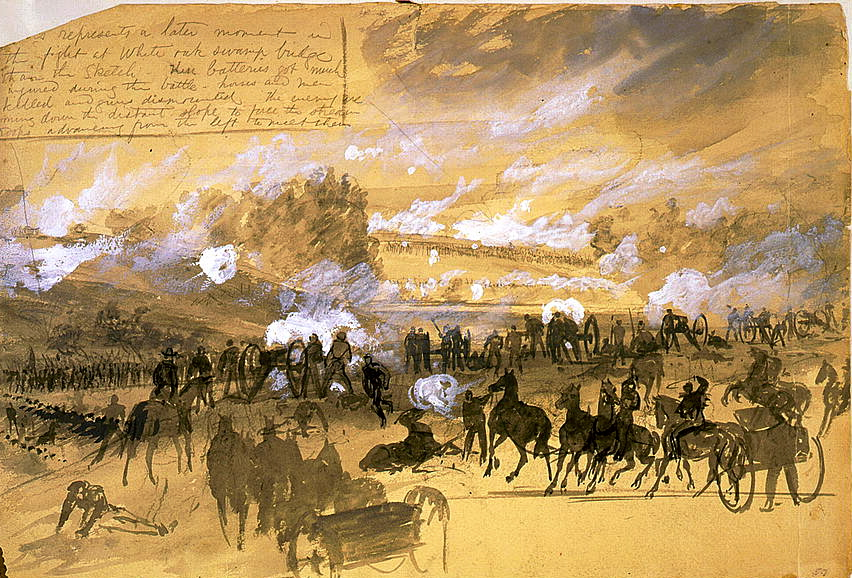
- Battle at White Oak Swamp Bridge; Alfred R. Waud, artist, June 1862
Date	June 30, 1862
Location	Henrico County, Virginia 37.4708°N 77.21025°W
Result	Inconclusive

Belligerents
United States (Union)	(Confederate States of America) CSA (Confederacy)

Commanders and leaders
William B. Franklin	Thomas J. "Stonewall" Jackson

Units involved
Units from Army of the Potomac	Units from Army of Northern Virginia

Casualties and losses
~100	15 total 3 killed 12 wounded

The Battle of White Oak Swamp took place on June 30, 1862, in Henrico County, Virginia, as part of the Seven Days Battles (Peninsula campaign) of the American Civil War. As the Union Army of the Potomac retreated southeast toward the James River, its rearguard under Maj. Gen. William B. Franklin stopped Maj. Gen. Thomas J. "Stonewall" Jackson's divisions at the White Oak Bridge crossing, resulting in an artillery duel, while the main Battle of Glendale raged two miles (3 km) farther south around Frayser's Farm. White Oak Swamp is generally considered to be part of the larger Glendale engagement. Because of this resistance from Brig. Gen. William B. Franklin's VI Corps, Jackson was prevented from joining the consolidated assault on the Union Army at Glendale that had been ordered by General Robert E. Lee, producing an inconclusive result, but one in which the Union Army avoided destruction and was able to assume a strong defensive position at Malvern Hill.

== Background ==
=== Military situation ===
The Seven Days Battles began with a Union attack in the minor Battle of Oak Grove on June 25, 1862, but McClellan quickly lost the initiative as Lee began a series of attacks at Beaver Dam Creek on June 26, Gaines's Mill on June 27, the minor actions at Garnett's and Golding's Farm on June 27 and June 28, and the attack on the Union rear guard at Savage's Station on June 29. McClellan's Army of the Potomac continued its retreat toward the safety of Harrison's Landing on the James River.

Most elements of McClellan's army had been able to cross White Oak Swamp Creek by noon on June 30. About one third of the army had reached the James River, but the remainder was still marching between White Oak Swamp and Glendale.

Lee ordered his Army of Northern Virginia to converge on the retreating Union forces, bottlenecked on the inadequate road network. Stonewall Jackson was ordered to press the Union rear guard at the White Oak Swamp crossing while the largest part of Lee's army, some 45,000 men, would attack the Army of the Potomac in mid-retreat at Glendale, about 2 miles (3.2 km) southwest, splitting it in two.

Stonewall Jackson had acquired fame for his brilliant campaign in the Shenandoah Valley, but had performed poorly so far under Lee's command in the Seven Days. Perhaps too fatigued from his campaign and travel from the Valley, he arrived late at Mechanicsville (Beaver Dam Creek) and inexplicably ordered his men to bivouac for the night within clear earshot of the battle. He was late and disoriented at Gaines's Mill. He was late again at Savage's Station. The upcoming action in support of Lee's assault at Glendale would offer him another opportunity. Jackson and Lee met privately on the morning of June 30 at Savage's Station and Lee's exact orders were not recorded, but they apparently were for Jackson to march to White Oak Swamp and engage the Union forces there to prevent them from reinforcing the remainder of the rear guard at Glendale.

The last Union unit to travel south through White Oak Swamp, and thus Jackson's target, was the VI Corps under Brig. Gen. William B. Franklin, consisting of the divisions of Brig. Gens. William F. "Baldy" Smith and Israel B. Richardson.

== Battle ==
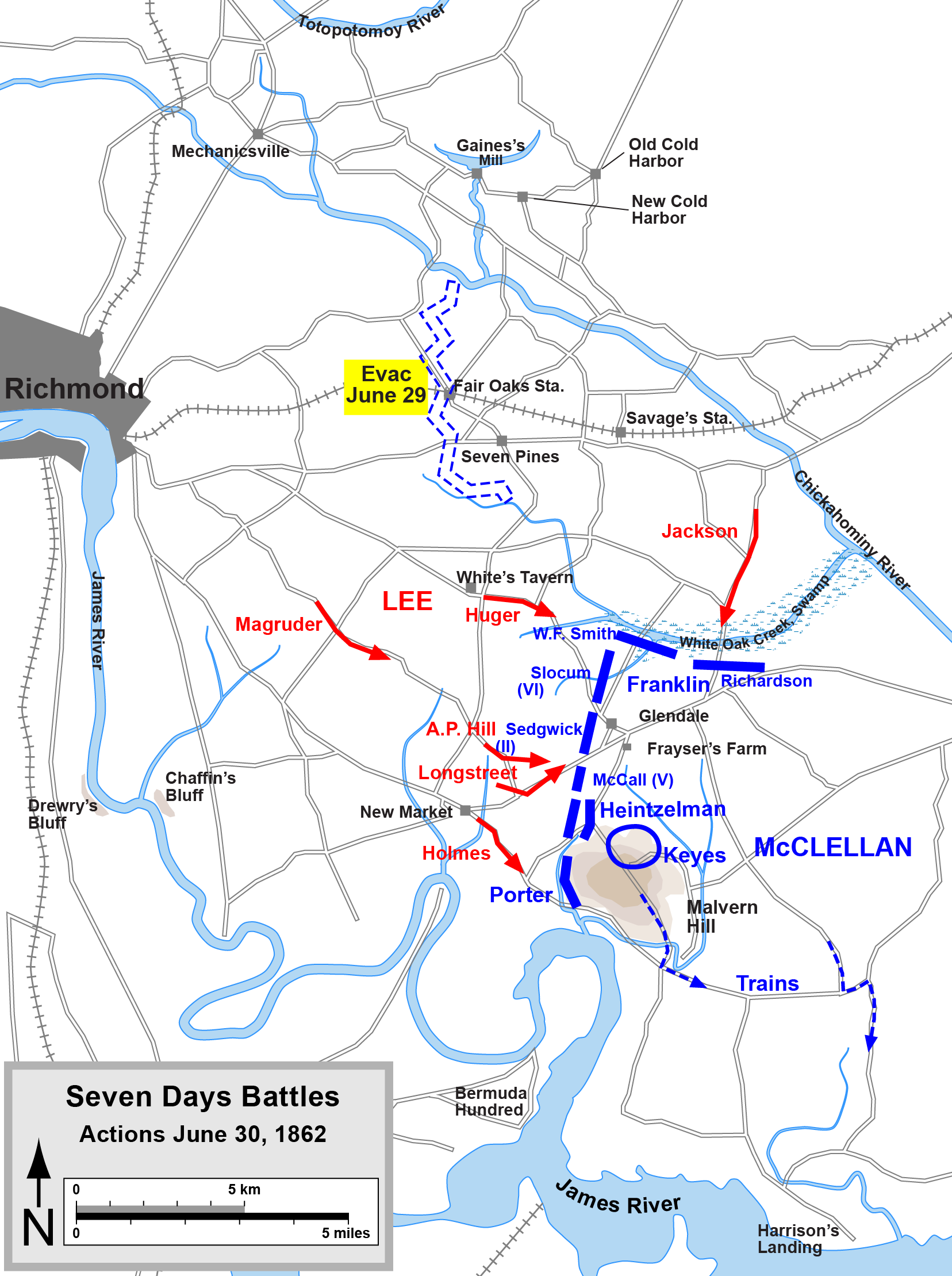
Seven Days Battles, June 30, 1862

Jackson's men marched south on the White Oak Road with their artillery chief, Colonel Stapleton Crutchfield, at the head of the column. They marched slowly because they were accompanied by thousands of wounded Union prisoners and many of the stores that they obtained at Savage's Station. They found that the single bridge over the swamp had been burned two hours earlier. Jackson arrived at noon and approved Crutchfield's gun emplacement that was designed to fire diagonally from a ridge across the swamp against the Union batteries and infantry positions that they saw about 300 yards (270 m) away. At 2 p.m. on June 30, seven Confederate batteries of 31 guns opened fire, catching the Union troops by surprise and disabling several of their cannons.

After ordering his engineers to begin rebuilding the bridge, Jackson directed Col. Thomas T. Munford's 2nd Virginia Cavalry to cross the swamp and capture some of the Union guns abandoned during the bombardment. As the men and horses waded through water that was belly deep and fouled with debris, Jackson and Maj. Gen. D.H. Hill crossed the river to perform a personal reconnaissance. A Union artillery shell exploded only a few feet away from the generals mounted on horseback, although neither was injured. Jackson saw that Union artillery and infantry was reinforcing the position, and that Federal sharpshooters would play havoc with his engineers on the bridge. He realized that this was not a place that he could make an opposed crossing.

Munford reported that he found a ford (Fisher's Ford) a quarter of a mile downstream that would be suitable for the infantry to cross. Brig. Gen. Wade Hampton found a closer point at which a simple bridge could be built for infantry. Jackson ordered him to build the bridge, but took no specific action to cross the swamp, having decided that it was infeasible to attack if he could not cross his artillery. While the artillery duel across the swamp escalated to over 40 guns, and while the battle at Glendale raged less than 3 miles (4.8 km) away, Jackson sat beneath a large oak tree and fell asleep for over an hour.

== Aftermath ==
Jackson's inaction allowed some units to be detached from Franklin's corps in late afternoon to reinforce the Union troops at Glendale. Jackson did not inform Lee of his situation and Lee did not send anyone to find Jackson until it was too late to make a difference. Although Jackson's wing of the Army and Franklin's corps comprised tens of thousands of men, the action at White Oak Swamp included no infantry activity and was limited to primarily an artillery duel. The Confederates lost 3 artillerymen killed and 12 wounded, but there is no exact record of the number of Union casualties; historian Brian K. Burton estimates as many as 100 Union casualties, with the highest losses in the 5th New Hampshire, which had 5 men killed and 9 wounded.

After dinner with his staff that night, Jackson fell asleep again, with a biscuit clenched between his teeth. Upon awakening he announced, "Now, gentlemen, let us at once to bed, and rise with the dawn, and see if tomorrow we can do something." Two weeks later he offered an explanation for his unusually lethargic conduct at the battle: "If General Lee had wanted me, he could have sent for me." Lee never criticized Jackson's performance in the battle.

Edward Porter Alexander, the prominent Confederate artillery commander and postwar historian, lamented about the great lost opportunity at Glendale and White Oak Swamp: "When one thinks of the great chances in General Lee's grasp that one summer afternoon, it is enough to make one cry ... to think that our Stonewall Jackson lost them."

== See also ==
- Troop engagements of the American Civil War, 1862
- List of costliest American Civil War land battles
- Richmond in the Civil War
- Virginia in the American Civil War
- List of American Civil War battles
- List of Virginia Civil War units
