= Fight at Waterford =

Battle of the American Civil War

- Part of the American Civil War
Date	August 27, 1862
Location	Waterford; Loudoun County, Virginia 39.18°N 77.61°W
Result	Confederate Victory

Belligerents
United States of America	Confederate States of America

Commanders and leaders
Samuel C. Means; Luther Slater	Elijah V. White

Units involved
Loudoun Rangers	35th Battalion of Virginia Cavalry

Strength
53	51

Casualties and losses
15 (2 killed, 11 wounded, 2 captured)	2 (2 killed)
- Location of the fight in Virginia

The Fight at Waterford was a small skirmish during the American Civil War that took place in Waterford, Virginia on August 27, 1862 between the local partisan cavalry units of White's Rebels, fighting for the Confederates, and the Loudoun Rangers fighting for the Union. The Rebels surprised and routed the newly formed Loudoun Rangers in their camp at Waterford, capturing nearly the whole unit before subsequently paroling them, thus resulting in a Confederate victory. The action was the first significant partisan fighting in Loudoun County.

== Background ==
On August 26, Captain Samuel C. Means moved his newly formed command, the independent Loudoun Rangers, to the unionist village of Waterford in Loudoun County, Virginia in preparation to conduct operations against the county's Confederate controlled territory. Means stationed 24 men on picket duty: 4 men on each of the 6 roads leading into the town. He then placed the rest of his command in the local Baptist church before retiring to his residence in the village, placing Lieutenant Luther Slater in nominal command of the unit.

Meanwhile, on the 25th, Captain Elijah V. White and his company of cavalry, some 100 strong, was granted permission by Gen. Richard S. Ewell to return to their native county to find forage and harass Federals operating in the county. The following day they reached the southern portion of the county whereupon they learned of the formation of the Loudoun Rangers a month prior and their presence at Waterford. That evening, with about half of his command, White tramped off the main roads through fields and forests to Waterford, evading the Ranger's pickets.

== The Skirmish ==
In the pre-dawn hours of the 27th, guided by local Confederate sympathizers, White's Rebels approached the Baptists church under cover of darkness to find the 28 Rangers there camped on the porch. Cpt. White decided to split his command in two and sent 30 men, mounted, onto the road as a decoy to draw the Rangers into the open, while the other 20, on foot, waited in the field across the street with orders to fire only after the Rangers took the bait. The anxious Rebels, however, failed to wait and opened fire on the Rangers early causing them to scramble into the refuge of the church, though not before suffering one killed one and two injured, including Lt. Slater who relinquished command to Charles A. Webster. White then sent his decoy force into town to capture Means and the Rangers pickets, while he, with the rest of the command laid siege to the church. In town, the Rebels found that Means and the pickets had fled, but were able to capture two sentries at Means house and a cache of weapons and supplies.

30 minutes into the fight, White sent local resident Mrs. Virts, whose home was adjacent to the Rebels position, across from the church, under a flag of truce to demand the Rangers surrender to which Webster flatly refused. Fighting continued for another hour before White again sent Mrs. Virts into the church to demand surrender, and again Webster refused, this time threatening to kill Mrs. Virts if she entered the church again. Fighting again resumed for another hour and half until 7 a.m. before surrender was demanded for again. With the Rangers out of ammunition, Webster agreed, so long as the prisoners would be immediately paroled. The Rebels too were short on ammunition and White agreed, taking the Rangers horses and weapons and paroling the 19 Rangers captured, the four unaccounted for Rangers had previously escaped by fleeing into the basement and exiting through a window in the back. The two sentries captured outside the church were not paroled and were sent to Richmond as P.O.W.s. During the surrender a member of the Rebels, William Snoots, rushed into the church and attempted to kill his brother, Charles Snoots, who was serving with the Rangers, but was disarmed before accomplishing his task.

== Results ==
The short fight cost the Rangers 2 killed, and 11 wounded in addition to the 56 horses, and 100 revolvers and carbines taken by the Rebels. It also marked the Ranger's first test of combat and immediately shed light on the lack of drilling and proper command. Means for his part had fled the village with his pickets leaving his command bereft of leadership in their first fight. Means was wanted by the state of Virginia for treason and subject to summary execution if captured. The Rebels who suffered 2 killed, showed lack of discipline in the fight as well but displayed the cunning and initiative against their enemy that would come to characterize the unit throughout the war and earn them the nickname "Comanches". The fight marked the first of many partisan encounters of Loudouners of divided sentiment on the war.
