= Virt (disambiguation) =

Virt is a municipality in Slovakia. It may also refer to:

- Jake Kaufman, 21st century American video game composer also known as virt
- Yuriy Virt (born 1974), Ukrainian retired football goalkeeper
- Virt Records, an independent record label

== See also ==
- Virts, a similar surname
