= Thomas T. Munford =

Confederate Army general (1831–1918)

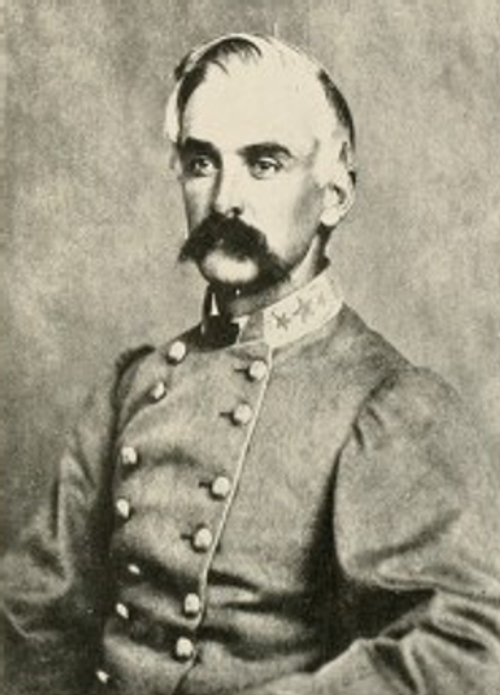
- Confederate Cavalry General Thomas T. Munford
- Born: March 29, 1831; Richmond, Virginia
- Died: February 27, 1918 (aged 86); Uniontown, Alabama
- Burial place: Lynchburg, Virginia
- Military career
- Allegiance: Confederate States of America
- Branch: Confederate States Army
- Service years: 1861–1865
- Rank: Colonel (Acting) Brigadier General (not confirmed by congress)
- Commands: 2nd Virginia Cavalry; Munford's Cavalry Brigade; Fitzhugh Lee's Cavalry Division
- Conflicts: American Civil War: First Battle of Manassas; Battle of Cross Keys; Battle of White Oak Swamp; Second Battle of Manassas; Battle of Mile Hill; Battle of South Mountain; Gettysburg campaign; Bristoe Campaign; Battle of Wapping Heights; Battle of Five Forks; Battle of High Bridge; Battle of Sayler's Creek
- Other work: planter, manufacturer, writer

Thomas Taylor Munford (March 29, 1831 – February 27, 1918) was an American farmer, iron, steel and mining company executive and Confederate colonel and acting brigadier general during the American Civil War.

== Early life and education ==
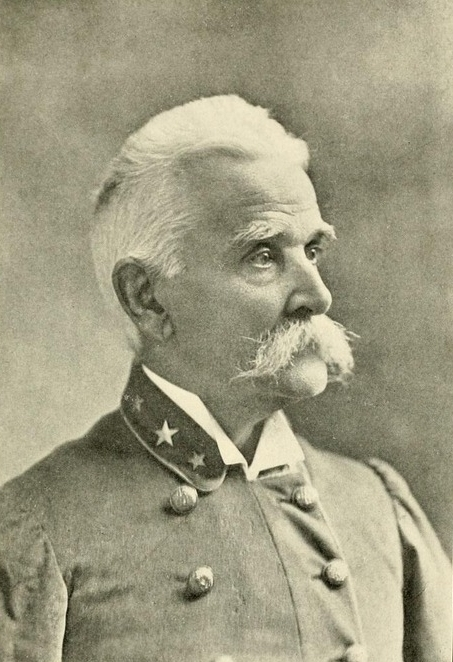
Thomas T. Munford

Munford was born in Richmond, Virginia, to Colonel George Wythe Munford and Lucy Singleton Taylor. He was descended from Lewis Dyve who fought in the English Civil War. On July 30, 1849, Munford enrolled at Virginia Military Institute and graduated in July 1852, standing 14th in a class of 24. He married Elizabeth Henrietta Tayloe, daughter of Mary Langhorne and George Plater Tayloe, in 1853. Prior to the Civil War, Munford was a cotton planter in Mississippi and farmer in Bedford County, Virginia.

== Civil War ==
With the outbreak of the Civil War, Munford was mustered into the Confederate States Army on May 8, 1861 by Colonel Jubal A. Early and served as a lieutenant colonel with the 30th Virginia Volunteer Regiment, a mounted infantry regiment, which fought at the First Battle of Manassas. When the cavalry was reorganized under J.E.B. Stuart, he was promoted to colonel of the 2nd Virginia Cavalry as the 30th Virginia Volunteer Regiment had been redesignated. In the 1862 Shenandoah Valley Campaign, Munford served under Thomas J. "Stonewall" Jackson as commander of a cavalry brigade of two regiments, succeeded Colonel and acting Brigadier General Turner Ashby as commander of all of Jackson's cavalry, upon that officer's death, and fought well at the Battle of Cross Keys and captured many prisoners at Harrisonburg, Virginia. During the Peninsula Campaign, he led his men at the Battle of White Oak Swamp. He served with efficiency in the Second Manassas Campaign in which he was slightly wounded at Turkey Run Bridge and the Second Battle of Bull Run. Munford was temporarily given an independent command of Robertson's brigade in the Maryland Campaign. During that campaign he successfully cleared Leesburg, Virginia of Union forces at the Battle of Mile Hill so that the army could cross the Potomac River from there. He led his troops in a key defensive position protecting Crampton's Gap at the Battle of South Mountain. His men saw limited action at the Battle of Antietam. They participated in several of Stuart's cavalry battles during the 1863 Gettysburg campaign and the Bristoe Campaign, as well as in cavalry actions in the Overland Campaign in Spring 1864 under Major General Fitzhugh Lee.

Munford was appointed to duty as a brigadier commander by Fitzhugh Lee on November 9, 1864, but, despite being described as a general in several sources, he was never officially commissioned and confirmed as a brigadier general. He took command of Fitzhugh Lee's cavalry division late in the war with that general's promotion to cavalry corps commander. and fought at Five Forks, High Bridge, and Sailor's Creek. He led men away from the Army of Northern Virginia prior to General Robert E. Lee's surrender at Appomattox Court House and escaped with a goal of reaching North Carolina to link up with the army of General Joseph E. Johnston during the Carolinas campaign. However, hearing that Johnston had since surrendered, Munford dispersed his force after reaching Lynchburg, Virginia.

== Personal life ==
His first wife died in 1863, and Munford was remarried to her cousin, Emma Tayloe, daughter of Henrietta Ogle and William Henry Tayloe, in 1866.

== Postwar career ==
After the war, Munford inherited his father-in-law's plantation, Oakland, in Perry County, Alabama and became a cotton planter in Alabama. He returned to Virginia and worked as a cotton planter and as an iron manufacturer and writer. He was Vice President of Lynchburg Iron, Steel & Mining Company. He served as President of the Virginia Military Institute Board of Visitors from 1884 to 1888.

== Death and legacy ==
On February 27, 1918 at the age of 86, Munford died at the home of his son in Uniontown, Alabama. He was buried at Spring Hill Cemetery in Lynchburg, Virginia.

== See also ==
- List of American Civil War generals (Acting Confederate)
