= James Sewall Reed =

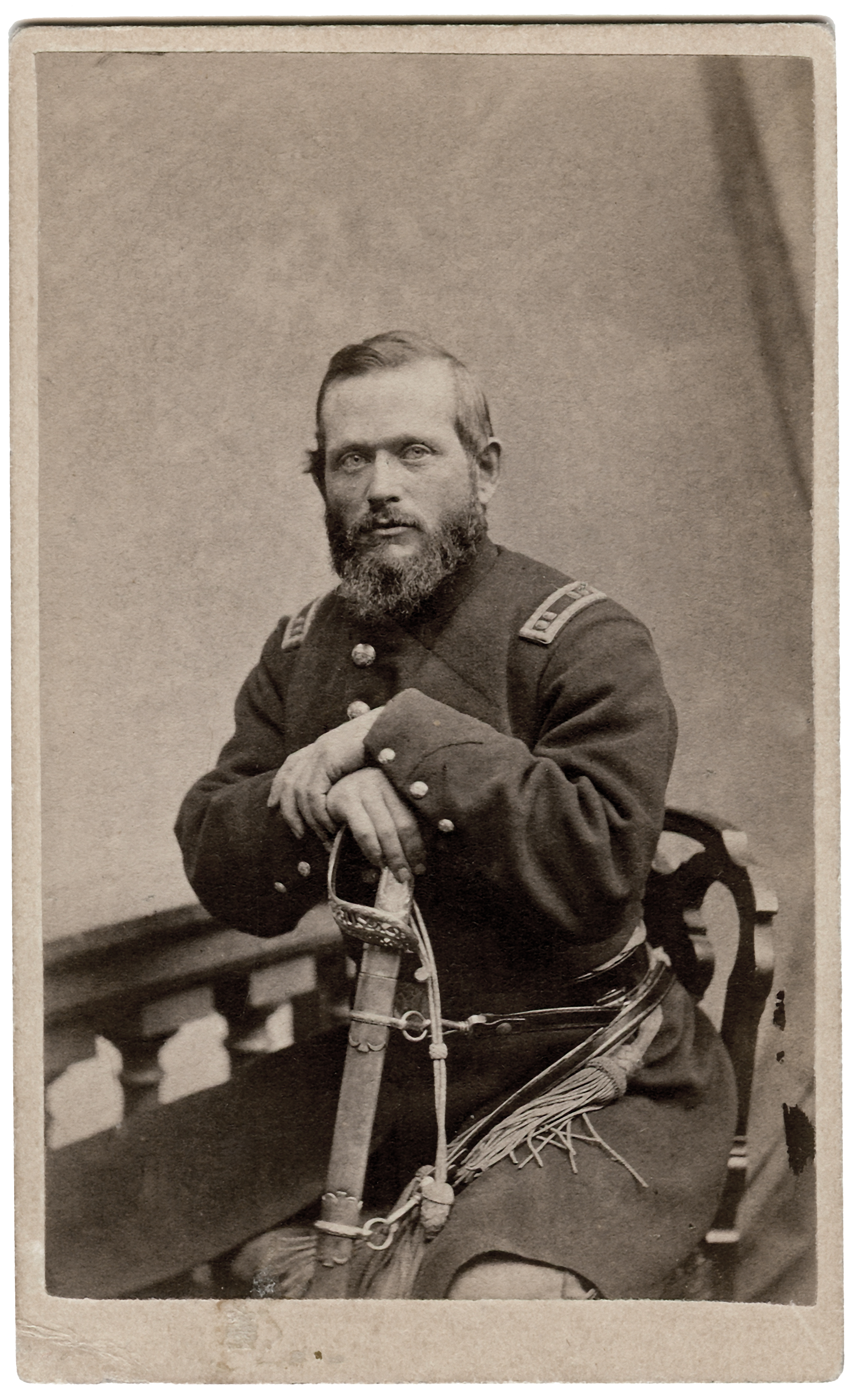
- Born: April 3, 1832; Milton, Massachusetts, U.S.
- Died: February 22, 1864 (age 31); Dranesville, Virginia, U.S.
- Burial place: Mattapan, Massachusetts, U.S.
- Military career
- Allegiance: United States of America
- Branch: (United States) Union Army
- Service years: 1861–1864
- Rank: Captain
- Unit: 2nd Regiment of Cavalry, Massachusetts Volunteers
- Commands: Company A "The California Hundred" 2nd Massachusetts Cavalry

James Sewall Reed (April 3, 1832 – February 22, 1864) was an American soldier who is best remembered as an organizer of a few hundred Californians who fought in the eastern battlefields of the American Civil War as part of the 2nd Massachusetts Cavalry while most soldiers from California were assigned to Union Army outposts west of the Mississippi River. Reed was killed at the Second Dranesville battle on February 22, 1864.

== Early years ==
Reed was the eldest of three sons of John Reed and Miranda Barker. He was born in Milton, Massachusetts. At the age of 17, Reed and his younger brother George left Boston for the California Gold Rush. The teenagers arrived in San Francisco Bay in March, 1850, and mined gold in Nevada City, California, until 1852. Reed became a member of the 1856 San Francisco Committee of Vigilance, and traveled Central America and South America before joining the Fraser Canyon Gold Rush of 1858. He returned to Boston in 1859 where he met and married Hattie L. Wales. Reed returned to San Francisco with his bride in September, 1859, and their son Walter Sewall Reed was born there on January 25, 1861.

== Civil War ==
Reed joined the California State Militia First Light Dragoons of San Francisco in November, 1861. The Dragoons' patrols of the Central Overland Route seemed unexciting in comparison to the newspaper accounts of civil war battles in the east. In the fall of 1862, a group of Californians from the northeastern United States approached Massachusetts governor John Albion Andrew proposing to supply a company of 100 cavalry volunteers. The governor accepted the volunteers with the stipulation the men would pay for their uniforms, equipment, and ship passage east. A Massachusetts enlistment bounty defrayed part of those costs, and citizens of San Francisco donated some equipment. Reed resigned his commission with the 1st Dragoons to become captain of the California Hundred.

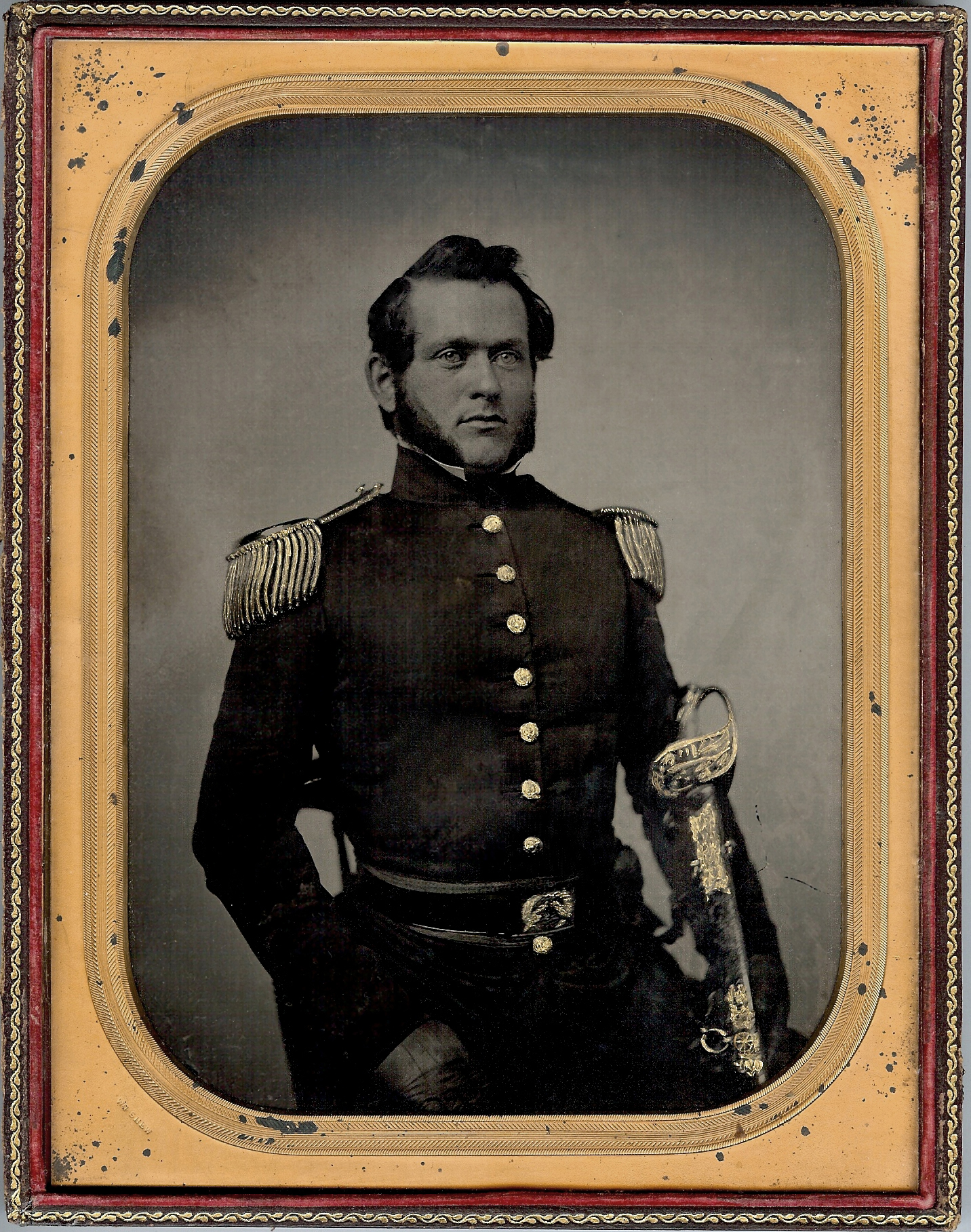
Pre-Civil War image of J. Sewall Reed as a member of the California First Light Dragoons.

The California Hundred sailed from San Francisco aboard the steamship Golden Age on December 10, 1862. After traveling across the isthmus of Panama and arriving in New York aboard the Ocean Queen, the California Hundred were designated company A of the 2nd Massachusetts Cavalry commanded by Colonel Charles Russell Lowell. Reed and his men went into combat in Virginia in April, 1863. Subsequent California volunteers were designated companies E, F, L, and M of the 2nd Massachusetts Cavalry. Men from Massachusetts formed seven more companies. Reed's company participated in a series of engagements with the 43rd Battalion Virginia Cavalry commanded by John S. Mosby. Reed was one of five Californians killed at the Second Dranesville battle on February 22, 1864.
