= St. Paul's Episcopal Church (Point of Rocks, Maryland) =

Historic church in Maryland, US

- U.S. National Register of Historic Places
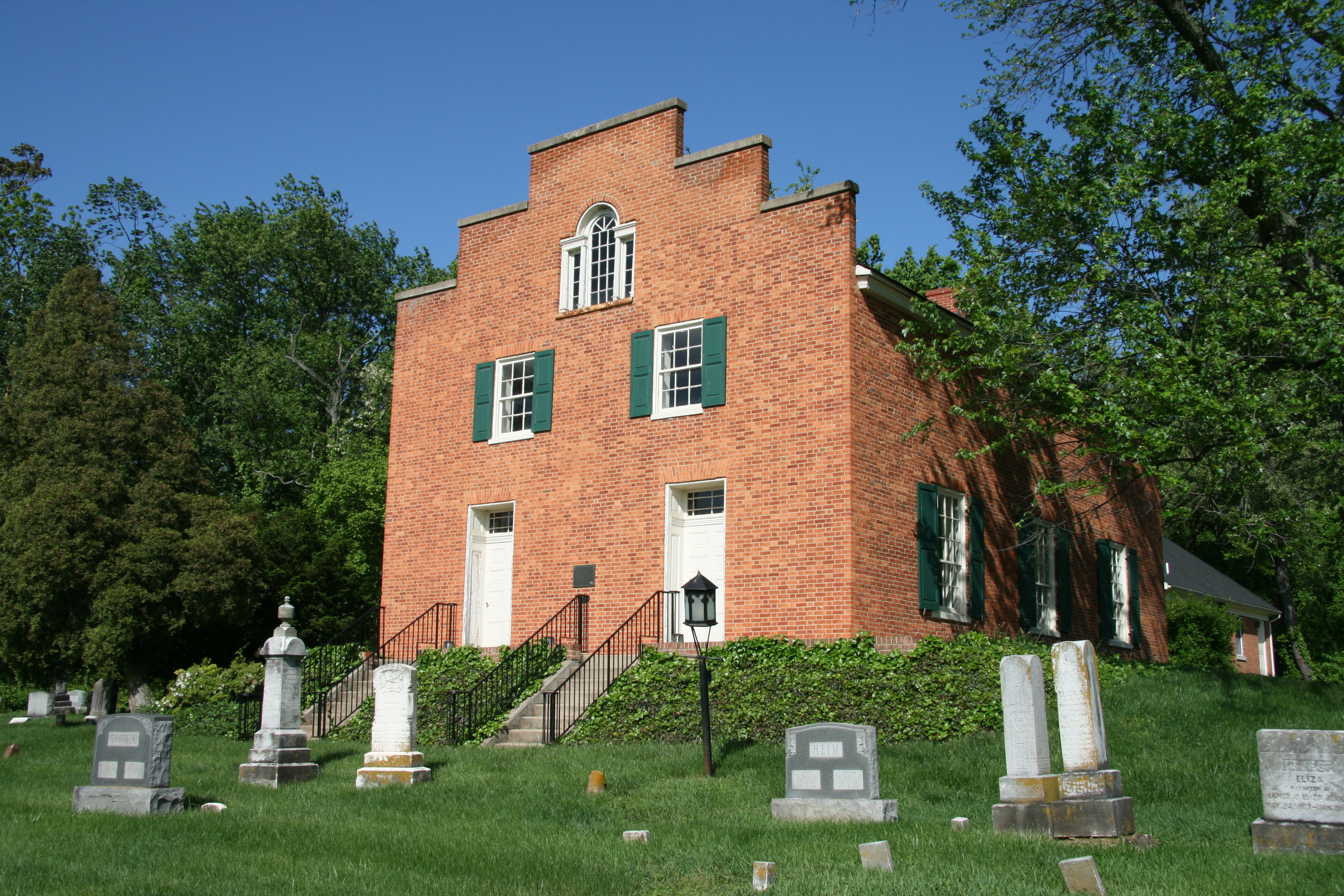

- Location within Maryland Location within the United States
- Location: North of Point of Rocks off U.S. Route 15 (Ballenger Creek Pike), Point of Rocks, Maryland
- Coordinates: 39°17′13″N 77°31′46″W
- Area: 3.9 acres (1.6 ha)
- Built: 1842
- Architectural style: Federal, Late Federal
- NRHP reference No.: 78001460
- Added to NRHP: January 31, 1978

St. Paul's Episcopal Church is a parish of the Episcopal Church near Point of Rocks, Frederick County, Maryland, in the Episcopal Diocese of Maryland. It is noted for its historic parish church, a small late Federal style brick structure built in 1842.

== History ==
Members of St. Mark's Parish in nearby Petersville successfully petitioned for the creation of a new parish by the name of St. Paul's in 1841. The congregation met in an old tobacco house until the completion of the church, which was built in 1842 and consecrated in 1843. Land for the church was donated by John Weitz and Col. David Duvall, who each gave half an acre.

During the Civil War the church's furnishings were stripped by Union troops who were using the church as a hospital. After the passage of the Tucker Act, the church vestry successfully sued the U.S. government in the U.S. Court of Claims for $1000 damages, which was used for restoration.

In 1882 inquiries began into the construction of a new chapel, also named St. Paul's. After floods of the Potomac River, the vestry moved the chapel to high ground, and it was consecrated in 1912 as the Church of the Holy Trinity. Liturgical activity migrated there, and by the 1920s St. Paul's was only used twice a year. As the years progressed, however, Holy Trinity proved more difficult to maintain, and on May 22, 1966, it was closed permanently, with the congregation returning to St. Paul's after extensive renovations. It was rededicated October 5, 1969, by Bishop Harry Lee Dall, and in 1974, the Diocese of Maryland sold Holy Trinity to a Baptist congregation.

== Architecture ==
Built of local brick by slaves from the nearby Duvall plantation, the church is uniquely austere in an area where the typical country church is a frame or brick Gothic vernacular style. Its features include a Dutch gable with a Palladian window.

It was listed on the National Register of Historic Places in 1978.
