= Battle of Loudoun Heights =

Battle of the American Civil War

Coordinates: 39°18.988′N 77°43.009′W

- Part of the American Civil War
Date	January 10, 1864
Location	Loudoun County, Virginia
Result	Union victory

Belligerents
United States of America	Confederate States of America

Commanders and leaders
Henry A. Cole	John S. Mosby

Units involved
1st Maryland Cavalry Battalion, Potomac Home Brigade	43rd Battalion Virginia Cavalry

Strength
300	100

Casualties and losses
26	14

The Battle of Loudoun Heights was a small cavalry skirmish during the American Civil War between John Mosby's Rangers and Major Henry A. Cole's 1st Potomac Home Brigade Maryland Cavalry on January 10, 1864, in Loudoun County, Virginia. Cole's Cavalry successfully defended a night raid against their camp on Loudoun Heights. The fight was one of the first engagements in which Union forces held their own against Mosby's vaunted partisans.

== Background ==
On January 1, 1864, eighty members of Cole's Maryland Cavalry, led by Captain A. M. Hunter, entered the region colloquially known as "Mosby's Confederacy" around Upperville and Rectortown, Virginia. With Mosby off on a scout in Fairfax, Capt. William "Billy" Smith rounded up 32 Rangers and set off in pursuit of the Federals. The Rangers caught up with Hunter's force near Middleburg. Captain Hunter quickly deployed his men into battle line just as Smith ordered a charge. The Federal line soon crumbled when Hunter's horse was killed, tumbling the captain to the ground. The Union cavalry hastily retreated towards Middleburg, but not before losing 57 killed, wounded or captured, as well as 60 horses seized by the Rangers.

Within a week, Cole's camp atop Loudoun Heights had been discovered, thanks to the work of Benjamin Franklin Stringfellow, a staff officer under J.E.B. Stuart temporarily attached to Mosby's command. Angered by the audacity of Cole's Cavalry to raid so deep into Mosby's territory and encouraged by the enemy's woeful performance at Middleburg, Mosby decided to attack Cole's main force, hoping to catch them unaware in their camp.

== The battle ==
On January 9, Mosby ordered a rendezvous at Upperville, to which 100 Rangers responded. The partisan company set out for Loudoun Heights through deep snow and bitter cold, reaching Woodgrove around 8 p.m. and stopping for 2 hours at the home of Ranger Henry Heaton. Just north of Hillsboro, they met up with Stringfellow and his scouting party, who informed Mosby of the exact location and strength of Cole's camp. Spotting Federal pickets posted along the Hillsboro-Harpers Ferry Road, the Confederates turned and headed east toward the wooded western slope of Short Hill Mountain, which they followed until they came to the bank of the Potomac River. From there, they turned westward and made their way along the riverbank to the base of Loudoun Heights. As the Rangers made their way up mountain, they were forced to dismount, given the steep grade. They stopped once they were within 200 yards (180 m) of the Union camp. Mosby sent a detachment of men under Stringfellow to capture Cole's headquarters in the rear of the camp, while he took the rest of the men further up the hillside, until they were directly west of the camp.

At around 3 a.m., as Mosby prepared to order the attack, gunfire erupted from the direction of Stringfellow's position, followed by the distant appearance of horsemen riding towards Mosby from the direction of the enemy camp. Thinking the unknown party was Federals who had discovered Stringfellow and his men, Mosby ordered a charge. His Rangers descended upon the camp and attacked the horsemen, who turned out to be Stringfellow's squadron. It was several minutes before the two parties recognized each other in the darkness, but not before several Confederates had been hit by friendly fire.

In the meantime, Cole's men were awakened by the gunfire. Led by Captain George W.F. Vernon, of Company A, the men grabbed their weapons and hastily formed a dismounted battle line, though many were barely dressed. Despite the darkness, the Federals easily identified the Rangers, who stood out as they were the only ones on horses. Their initial volley dropped several Confederates, many of whom were caught out in the open along the road.

In the confusion of the 45 minute fight that followed, several Rangers retreated and, soon afterward, with the sound of Federal infantry approaching from Harpers Ferry, Mosby ordered a general withdrawal. The Rangers escaped with 6 prisoners (pickets from Co. B of Cole's Cavalry, all taken from their post along the Hillsboro road at the crossing of Piney Run) and nearly 60 horses, but were forced to leave their dead and seriously wounded behind. A few miles beyond the Union camp, Mosby halted and sent two Rangers back under a flag of truce to exchange the prisoners for their dead and wounded, which included Billy Smith and First Lieutenant Thomas Turner. Major Cole, however, declined the offer, and the Rangers left and made their way back towards Mosby's Confederacy.

== Aftermath ==
Mosby's Rangers suffered 14 casualties—4 dead, 4 mortally wounded, 5 wounded and 1 captured. Among the wounded was William "Willie" Mosby, John's brother. Of the dead, it was believed that 3 were victims of friendly fire. Cole suffered 6 dead, 14 wounded, and 6 captured. For their performance in the fight, the first in which Federals had bested Mosby's Rangers, Cole was promoted from major to colonel and Vernon from captain to lieutenant colonel.
