= Henry A. Cole =

American Civil War officer (1838–1909)

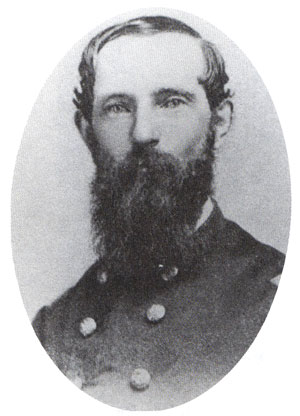
- Born: July 25, 1838; Frederick, Maryland, U.S.
- Died: May 26, 1909 (aged 70); Baltimore, Maryland, U.S.
- Burial place: Mount Olivet Cemetery; Frederick, Maryland, U.S.
- Military career
- Allegiance: United States (Union)
- Branch: United States Army (Union Army)
- Service years: 1861 – 1865
- Rank: Colonel
- Commands: 1st Maryland Cavalry Battalion, Potomac Home Brigade
- Conflicts: American Civil War: Jackson's Valley campaign; First Battle of Kernstown; Maryland campaign; Battle of Mile Hill; Battle of Harpers Ferry; Mosby's Operations in Northern Virginia; Battle of Loudoun Heights

Henry Alexander Cole (July 25, 1838 – May 26, 1909) was an American colonel who commanded the 1st Maryland Cavalry Battalion, Potomac Home Brigade across the operations at his home state of Maryland and Virginia during the American Civil War.

== Biography ==
Henry was born on July 25, 1838, at Frederick, Maryland. He enlisted in the Union Army on August 10, 1861, and was appointed captain of Company A of the 1st Maryland Cavalry Battalion, Potomac Home Brigade on November 27, 1861, which would later go on to be known as "Cole's Cavalry". He was promoted to major on August 1, 1862, after Companies A, B, C, and D merged within the 1st Maryland. He would begin active combat by participating in the First Battle of Kernstown and the Battle of Mile Hill. Cole would go on to participate at the Battle of Harpers Ferry of the Maryland campaign during a cavalry breakout at the final stages of the battle. He also delivered the dispatch from a beleaguered garrison to George B. McClellan, receiving a personal thanks for the retrieval. After the Battle of Harpers Ferry, Cole would remain at Northern Virginia as they were facing John S. Mosby's Operations in Northern Virginia and would go on to participate at the Battle of Loudoun Heights and was promoted to Lieutenant Colonel for his victory at the battle on March 15, 1864. He was then fully promoted to colonel April 20, 1864. Cole was then mustered out along with his men on June 28, 1865, at Harpers Ferry, West Virginia. He died on May 26, 1909, in Baltimore. He is buried at Mount Olivet Cemetery.
