= Second Battle of Dranesville =

Battle of the American Civil War

- Part of the American Civil War
| Date | February 22, 1864 |
| Location | Loudoun County, Virginia 39.01°N 77.37°W |
| Result | Confederate Victory |

Belligerents
| United States of America | Confederate States of America |

Commanders and leaders
| James Sewall Reed † | John S. Mosby |

Units involved
| 2nd Massachusetts Cavalry; 16th New York Cavalry | 43rd Battalion Virginia Cavalry |

Strength
| 167 | 160 |

Casualties and losses
| 107 (12 killed, 25 wounded, 70 captured) | 6 (1 killed, 5 wounded) |
- Location of the battle in Virginia

The Second Battle of Dranesville, also known as the Ambush at Anker's Shop, was a small cavalry skirmish that took place between Confederate forces under Colonel John Mosby and Union forces under Captain James Sewall Reed east of Dranesville, Virginia in Loudoun County near present-day Sterling on February 22, 1864, as part of Mosby's operations in Northern Virginia in the American Civil War. After successfully defending a raid into "Mosby's Confederacy" by Cole's Maryland Cavalry, the following day Mosby led his Rangers against a second raid by Reed. The action resulted in a Confederate victory.

== Background ==
=== Blackleys Grove ===
On February 20 a detachment of Cole's Maryland Cavalry, 200 strong, left Harpers Ferry for Upperville, where they surprised and captured 11 of Mosby's Rangers. They then set out south for Piedmont Station (present day Deleplane), shortly thereafter they came upon another partisan, Bill McCobb, who rushed to his horse, but was thrown from it and killed when it jumped a fence.

Mosby, who was at the Heartland farm on the road to Piedmont Station with four of his officers, was alerted off the oncoming Federals by a scout as they ate breakfast. The five Rangers rushed from the house to find the Federals on the road and immediately fired on the force. The gunfire surprised Cole who withdrew his force back towards Upperville. The gunfire also roused 60 or so Rangers staying in the area. At Piedmont Station, the Rangers rendezvoused and set out in pursuit of the Federals, catching up with them at Upperville. A running fight ensued for 3 miles (4.8 km) until Cole reached the ground of Blackleys Grove School and halted. There, he deployed his men behind a stone wall to contest the Rangers advance. The Rangers halted at the other side of the field and a firefight broke out between the two lines. Capt. W.L. Morgan of the 1st New York Cavalry was killed by Ranger Richard Mountjoy when he rode beyond the Federal line. Shortly thereafter, Cole ordered a charge. The Rangers repulsed the charge and counterattacked. Twice more the Federals charged as the fight swirled around the school and twice more they were repulsed. Mosby then split his force in two and flanked Cole forcing him to retire. As he withdrew he placed skirmishers behind the numerous stone walls he crossed, impeding the Ranger's pursuit. In the fight the Rangers killed 6 and wounded 7, while suffering only 3 wounded in addition to the 11 captured who were not liberated in the fight.

== The battle ==
The following morning, 160 Rangers gathered to bury McCobb. At the same time Maj. Charles Russell Lowell dispatched 167 troopers of the 2nd Massachusetts Cavalry and 16th New York Cavalry under Capt. James Sewall Reed, on a raid into Loudoun. At the funeral near Middleburg, Mosby learned of the Federal raid and mounted the Rangers in pursuit, sending the bulk of the force under William Henry Chapman to Ball's Mill, south of Leesburg, while he and a small party shadowed the Federals. At Leesburg, Reed, not finding any sign of Confederates, set out east on the Leesburg-Alexandria Turnpike, camping 6 miles (9.7 km) east of the town that night. As the Federals bivouacked, Mosby rejoined his main body, who he had since directed to Guilford Station (present day Sterling) on the Alexandria, Loudoun and Hampshire Railroad. Upon rejoining the Rangers Mosby led them to the pike, 2 miles (3.2 km) west of Dranesville and deployed them in three wings; a dismounted squad on the Pike and two companies on each flank concealed in the woods to the sides of the road. A skirmish party was sent west on the Pike as bait for the ambush.

At 10 a.m. the Federals broke camp and came upon Mosby's skirmishers an hour later. As the Federal vanguard, in pursuit of the fleeing skirmishers, came into sight the flank wings sprung the trap, missing the main Federal force. Reed took advantage of the mistake and ordered a counterattack. The two force collided in heavy hand-to-hand combat. At one point in the fighting Ranger John Munson captured a Federal trooper but failed to take his sidearm and when he turned to rejoin the fight the Yankee shot him in the back. Moments later, Ranger Baron Robert von Massow captured Reed, but he too failed to take his side arm and was also shot in the back. William Chapman wasted no time in killing Reed in retaliation. With Reed dead, the Federal resistance gave way and the Rangers chased them north towards the Potomac River. Several of the Federal troopers jumped into the river in their haste to flee and drowned.

== Results ==
In the action, known to the Rangers as 2nd Dranesville, the Rangers killed 12, wounded 25 and captured 70 along with 100 horse while losing only 5 wounded and 1 killed.
