= 35th Virginia Cavalry Battalion =

- Flag of Virginia
- Active: December 1862 to April 1865
- Country: Confederate States of America
- Branch: Confederate States Army
- Type: Cavalry
- Role: Partisan
- Size: 6 companies
- Stars and Bars
- Engagements: American Civil War: Jackson's Valley Campaign; The Fight at Waterford; Battle of Brandy Station; Battle of Gettysburg; Beefsteak Raid; Battle of High Bridge; Battle of Cedar Creek

Commanders
- 1st: Elijah V. White

The 35th Virginia Cavalry Battalion, also known as White's Battalion, White's Rebels and the Comanches, was a Confederate cavalry unit during the American Civil War raised by Elijah V. White in Loudoun County, Virginia in the winter of 1861–62. The battalion was initially raised as border guards along the Potomac River below Harpers Ferry but were ultimately mustered into regular service as part of the Laurel Brigade. Despite this, they continued to play a conspicuous role in the ongoing partisan warfare in Loudoun throughout the war. The battalion was particularly notable during the 1863 Gettysburg campaign, when it played a prominent role in the Battle of Brandy Station and subsequently conducted a series of raids on Union-held railroads and defensive positions in Maryland and Pennsylvania. The 35th was the first Confederate unit to enter Gettysburg, Pennsylvania.

== Organization and service history ==
Formed in December 1861 by Elijah V. White in Loudoun County, Virginia, the 35th consisted of six companies of cavalry, five of which were from Virginia and one from neighboring Maryland.

- A - White's Rebels
- B - Chiswell's Maryland Exiles (Montgomery County, Maryland)
- C - Grubb's Company
- D - Trayhern's Company
- E - Grabill's Company (Page and Shenandoah counties)
- F - Ferneyhough's Co.

The battalion never reached enough strength to become of full regiment. It was initially assigned to border service in Loudoun County, aiding the commands of Maj. Gen. D.H. Hill in Leesburg and Lt. Gen. Stonewall Jackson in Winchester. When Hill's command was evacuated from Leesburg to Richmond during the Peninsula Campaign, the 35th briefly joined the 2nd Virginia Cavalry based in Fauquier County, frequently raiding the Union garrisons in Loudoun, before being assigned to Jackson, where it took part in his famous Valley Campaign. In late 1862 the 35th was briefly put under the control of Maj. Gen. Jeb Stuart.

When not serving with the main army, the 35th was highly involved in the bitter partisan warfare that divided the loyalty of the residents of the Loudoun County. When mustered into the regular army, the 35th were frequently granted extended leave to return to Loudoun to seek forage and new mounts, and while at home often engaged the Federals in the area, including their western county nemesis, the Loudoun Rangers such as at the Fight at Waterford. In addition, one of White's men, John Mobberly, broke off from the unit and formed an independent guerrilla command that terrorized northwest Loudoun County during the later years of the war.

=== Gettysburg campaign ===
As J.E.B. Stuart began concentrating widely scattered Confederate cavalry and mounted infantry units in late May 1863 in preparation for the upcoming summer campaign, the 35th Battalion was assigned to the brigade of William E. "Grumble" Jones in the Army of Northern Virginia. The 35th took part in the Battle of Brandy Station on June 9. It formed a key part of the defensive position near St. James Church early in the battle, helping to fend off a series of charges by Union cavalry. Later, the battalion made a key counterattack on Federal troops on Fleetwood Hill, helping stabilize the Confederate line.

Within a few days after Brandy Station, the 35th was attached to the Second Corps of Lt. Gen. Richard Ewell to screen the advance into Maryland and Pennsylvania, and to conduct a series of raids against Federal supply lines. White led a daring attack on the Baltimore & Ohio Railroad depot at Point-of-Rocks, Maryland, in which he routed his old nemesis, the Loudoun Rangers, seized and burned supply wagons, and captured a trainload of supplies intended for the Union garrison at nearby Harpers Ferry. After entering Pennsylvania on June 23, Ewell assigned the 35th to the division of Maj. Gen. Jubal A. Early, which reached Gettysburg on June 26. White's men routed Union militia and home guard cavalry near Marsh Creek and became the first Confederate troops to enter the borough.

The 35th was assigned by Early to accompany a separate expeditionary force of infantry, artillery, and cavalry under the command of Brig. Gen. John B. Gordon that departed Gettysburg for York County, Pennsylvania, with a goal of capturing the town of York and seizing important Susquehanna River crossings. White's battalion destroyed scores of railroad bridges and conducted a successful raid that seized the important railroad and telegraphic center at Hanover Junction, Pennsylvania. Elements of the battalion were among the first Confederate troops to reach the Susquehanna at Wrightsville, Pennsylvania, on June 28, skirmishing with the First Troop, Philadelphia City Cavalry before turning westward, where the 35th performed scouting and flank protection duty during the Battle of Gettysburg.

=== Later campaigns and actions ===
Later in 1863, the 35th was re-attached to the famed "Laurel Brigade", serving again directly under General Jones in the Mine Run and Bristoe campaigns. In 1864, the 35th was again active in the Loudoun Valley, as well as supporting the Army of Northern Virginia during the Overland Campaign and subsequent actions. In September 1864, the 35th accompanied Lt. Gen. Wade Hampton on his famous Cattle raid, where they played a key role in driving off the Federal cattle guards and securing the cattle.

In April 1865, the battalion was the rearguard as the Army of Northern Virginia retreated up the Appomattox River. Just prior to Gen. Robert E. Lee's surrender at Appomattox Court House, members of the 35th served as couriers delivering General Ulysses S. Grant's surrender terms. Lt. Colonel White and the 35th did not surrender with the rest of the army, but instead rode around enemy lines and returned to Loudoun County, where they disbanded.

=== In popular media ===
In his 1987 novel, Spangle, author Gary Jennings gives a semi-fictionalized account of the battalion's break-up, via the fictional Col. Zachary Edge, CSA.

== See also ==
- List of Virginia Civil War units

== Notes ==
The Comanches, by Frank M Myers, late Capt 35th Virginia Cavalry
