= William Virts House =

Historic house in Virginia, United States

- U.S. National Register of Historic Places
- Virginia Landmarks Register
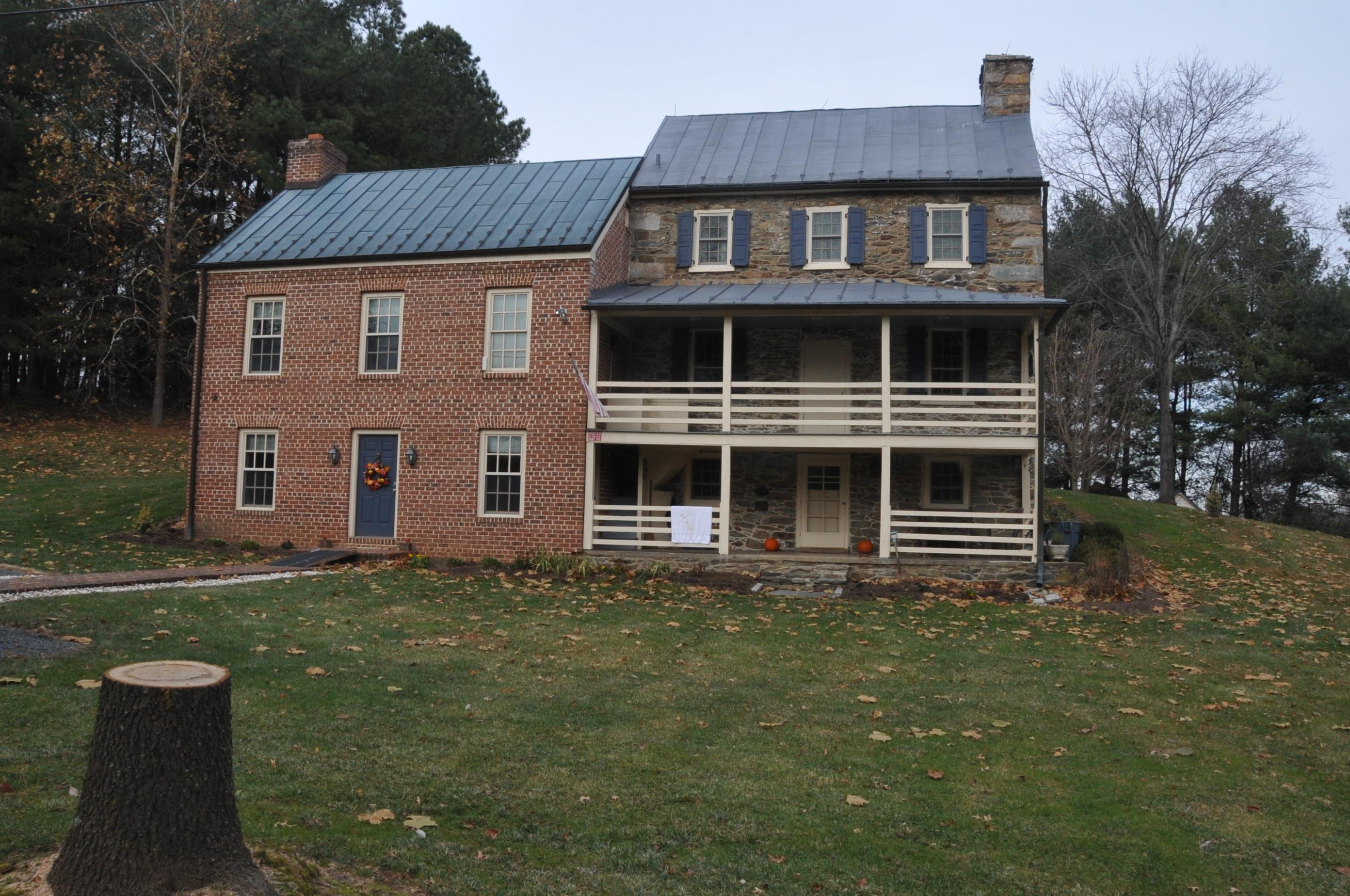

- Location within Northern Virginia Location within Virginia Location within the United States
- Location: 38670 Old Wheatland Rd., near Waterford, Virginia
- Coordinates: 39°11′16″N 77°39′57″W
- Area: 3 acres (1.2 ha)
- Built: c. 1798, c. 1813, c. 1930
- Architectural style: Federal
- NRHP reference No.: 11000027
- VLR No.: 053-0598

Significant dates
- Added to NRHP: February 22, 2011
- Designated VLR: December 16, 2010

William Virts House, also known as the Uriah Beans House, is a historic home located near Waterford, Loudoun County, Virginia. It is a 2 1/2-story, three-bay, Federal-style stone dwelling that took this form about 1813. It has a side gable roof and sits on a banked basement built about 1798. Also on the property are the contributing 1 1/2-story vernacular stone spring house built about 1813 and frame shed built about 1840.

It was listed on the National Register of Historic Places in 2011.
