= Loudoun Heights (mountain) =

Mountain in the United States

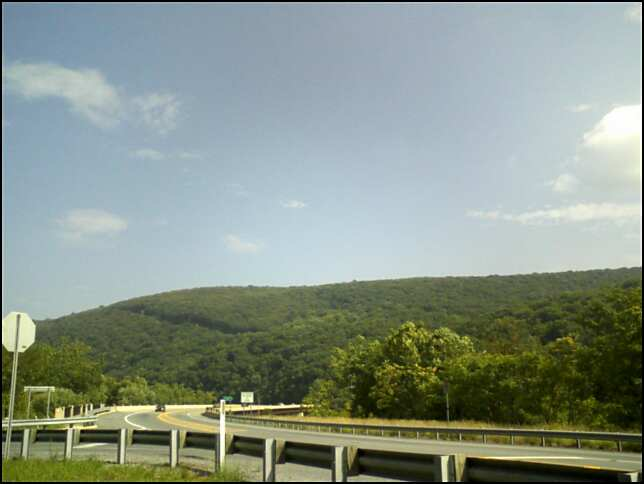
- Loudoun Heights from U.S. Rt. 340 in West Virginia

Highest point
- Elevation: 1,175 ft (358 m)
- Prominence: 340 ft (100 m)
- Coordinates: 39°18′28″N 77°44′19″W

Geography
- Location within Virginia
- Location: Loudoun County, Virginia / Jefferson County, West Virginia, U.S.
- Parent range: Blue Ridge Mountains; Appalachian Mountains
- Topo map: USGS Harpers Ferry

Loudoun Heights, sometimes referred to as Loudoun Mountain, is the first peak of the Blue Ridge Mountain south of the Potomac River in Loudoun County, Virginia and Jefferson County, West Virginia. The northwestern slope is part of Harpers Ferry National Historical Park.

== History ==
The peak, which overlooks Harpers Ferry, was used by Stonewall Jackson to bombard the town during the Battle of Harpers Ferry. It was also the scene of the first and perhaps worst defeat for Confederate Partisan John Mosby at the hands of the Cole's Maryland Cavalry during the Battle of Loudoun Heights.

== Hiking ==
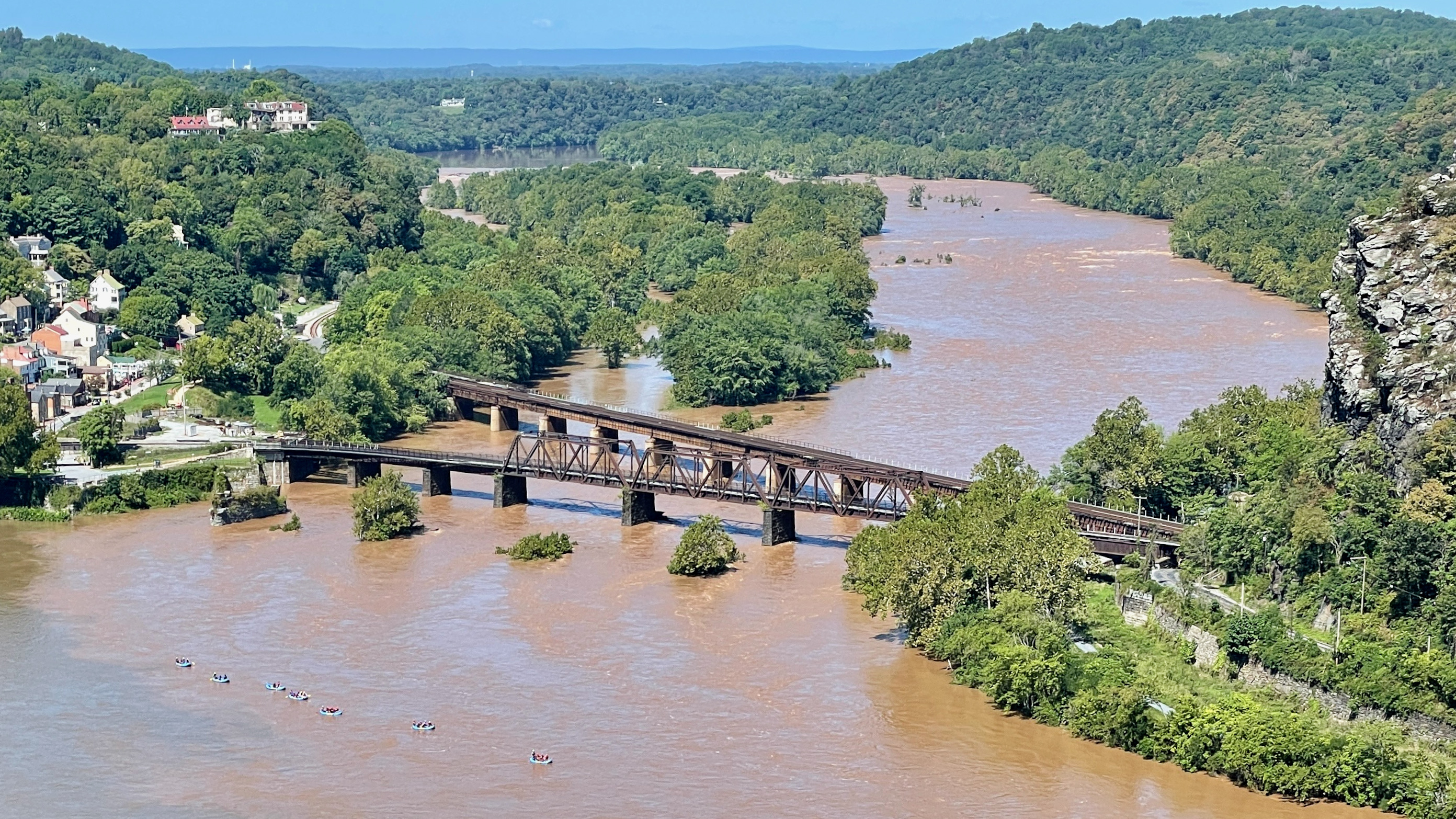
View from the Split Rock overlook

The Appalachian Trail (AT) traverses the peak before descending its northwestern slope to the Shenandoah River and Harpers Ferry. A spur trail called the Loudoun Heights Trail (the original route of the AT) leads off the AT down the northern slope, passing by Civil War earthworks and providing good views of the confluence of the Potomac and Shenandoah as well as Harpers Ferry at the Split Rock overlook. The trail until recently descended from the overlook before crossing the Potomac on the U.S. Route 340 bridge and rejoining the AT at Sandy Hook, Maryland. However, this section was closed due to erosion and damage following storms.
