= Elijah V. White =

Confederate Army officer (1832 - 1907)

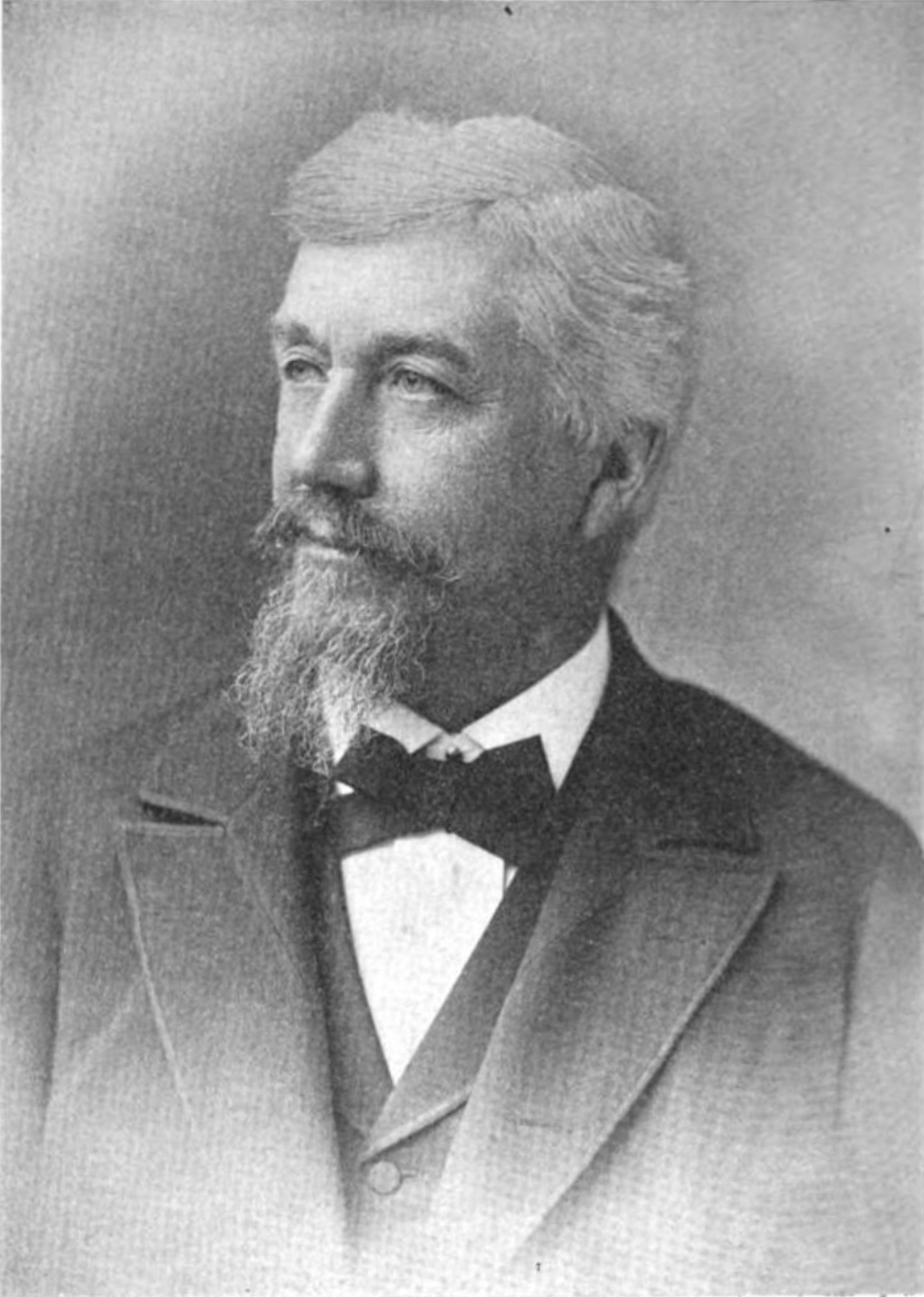
- Photo of White in a 1924 publication
- Born: Elijah Viers White; August 29, 1832; Poolesville, Maryland, U.S.
- Died: January 11, 1907 (aged 74); Leesburg, Virginia, U.S.
- Burial place: Union Cemetery; Leesburg, Virginia
- Education: Granville College
- Spouse(s): Sara Elizabeth Gott (m. 1857, died) Margaret Gittings Baines (m. 1894)
- Children: 5
- Military career
- Allegiance: Confederate States of America
- Branch: Confederate States Army
- Service years: 1861–1865
- Rank: Lieutenant colonel
- Nickname: "Lige"
- Units: Loudoun Cavalry; 7th Virginia Cavalry
- Commands: 35th Virginia Cavalry Battalion; Laurel Brigade
- Conflicts: American Civil War; Valley Campaign; Battle of Brandy Station; Battle of Gettysburg; Battle of High Bridge

Signature
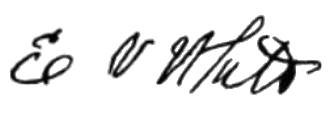

Elijah Viers "Lige" White (August 29, 1832 – January 11, 1907) was commander of the partisan 35th Battalion of Virginia Cavalry during the American Civil War. His men became commonly known as "White's Comanches" for their war cries and sudden raids on enemy targets.

== Early life ==
Elijah Viers White was born on August 29, 1832, in Poolesville, Maryland. He attended Lima Seminary in Livingston County, New York, and Granville College (later Denison University).

In 1855, White moved to Missouri to fight in the border wars with Kansas. The following year, he returned to Maryland. In 1857, he bought the 355-acre (1.44 km^{2}) Ball farm across the Potomac River in Loudoun County, Virginia, in the vicinity of the Big Spring north of Leesburg.

== Civil War ==
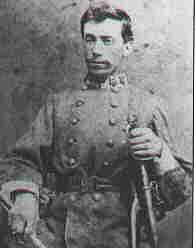
Military Portrait of E.V. White

At the outbreak of the Civil War, White enlisted in Captain Daniel T. Shreve's Loudoun Cavalry, where he quickly rose to the rank of corporal. His service with the unit was short, and in June 1861 he joined Company C in Lieutenant Colonel Turner Ashby's 7th Virginia Cavalry. While home on furlough, White served as an aide and scout for Colonel Eppa Hunton's 8th Virginia Infantry during the Battle of Ball's Bluff. For his service in the fight, White was given a captain's commission and ordered to raise a company of men for border service in the Provisional Army of the Confederacy.

=== The 35th ===
In December 1861, White established recruiting offices for his command in Leesburg, and by January 11 he had raised enough men to have an active unit in the army. He was ordered to scout around Waterford. On October 28, 1862, the 35th Battalion of Virginia Cavalry was organized with White commanding as major. Although raised for border service and highly involved in the partisan fighting in Loudoun County, White and the 35th were quickly mustered into regular service and fought in several major campaigns and battles, including Jackson's Valley Campaign and the Battle of Brandy Station. The 35th Battalion was one of the first Confederate units to arrive in Gettysburg, chasing off Pennsylvania militia on June 26, 1863, during an expedition to the Susquehanna River. His battalion was nicknamed "White's Comanches".

For the final months of the war, White and the 35th were a part of the celebrated "Laurel Brigade." Following the Battle of High Bridge on April 6, 1865, in which General James Dearing was fatally wounded, White was placed in command of that brigade. Four days later, White disbanded the Laurel Brigade and the 35th. Nearly a month later on May 8, White was paroled in Winchester.

== Postbellum life ==
After the war, White returned to Loudoun County a hero and resumed his farming operations and a mercantile business. In 1866 he successfully ran for county sheriff. The four-year term was the only time in public office that White would spend. He was also elected as treasurer of Loudoun County. In 1872, he took over operation of Conrad's Ferry, changing the name to White's Ferry. He served as president of People's National Bank of Leesburg from 1892 to his death.

On April 15, 1866, he was baptised by elder Joseph Furr and was ordained minister on August 18, 1877, of the Primitive Baptist Church. After the death of Furr, he became pastor of the New Valley, Mill Creek and Frying Pan churches in Virginia.

== Personal life ==
White married Sara Elizabeth Gott of Montgomery County, Maryland, in 1857. They had five children, E. B., B. V., John G., Mrs. John Gold and Mrs. Isaac Long. His wife died in the 1880s. In 1894, he married Margaret Gittings Baines of Philadelphia.

White died on January 11, 1907, at his home in Leesburg. Senator John W. Daniel attended his funeral. He is buried in Union Cemetery in Leesburg.
