= Samuel C. Means =

Union Army officer (1827–1891)

Samuel Carrington Means
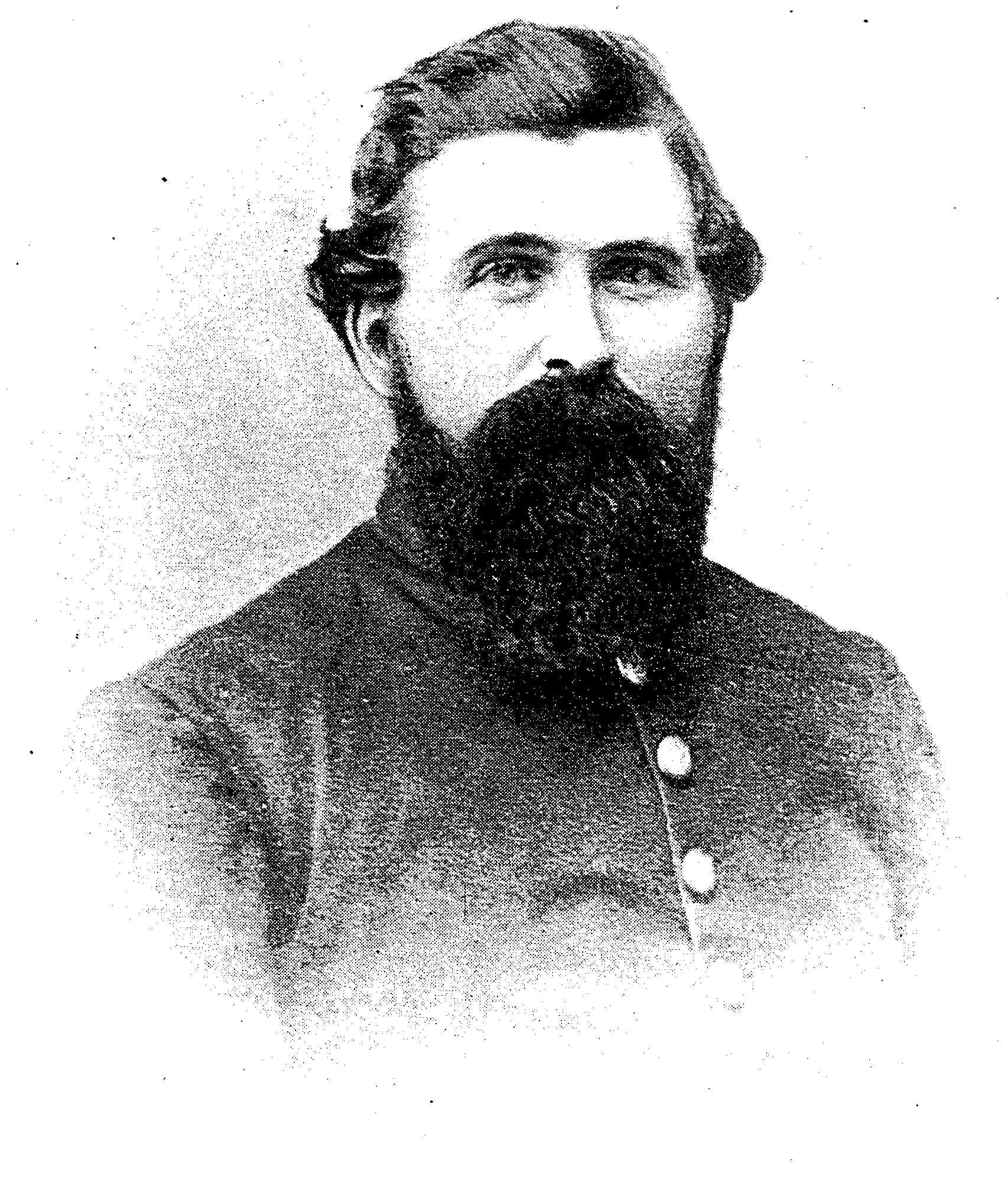
- Sketch of Samuel Means
- Born: August 5, 1827; Fauquier County, Virginia, U.S.
- Died: March 2, 1884 (aged 56); Washington, D.C., U.S.
- Spouse: Rachel Ann
- Military career
- Allegiance: United States of America: Union
- Branch: Union Army
- Service years: 1862–64
- Rank: Captain
- Commands: Loudoun Rangers
- Conflicts: American Civil War: Battle of Charlestown; Battle of Monocacy

Samuel Carrington Means (August 5, 1827 – March 2, 1891) was the founder and first captain of the Loudoun Rangers, a Union Army unit from Virginia that served during the American Civil War.

Means was a successful gristmiller and businessman from Waterford, Virginia, with several ties through his business to Point of Rocks, Maryland, where he was station master for the B&O Railroad. After the secession of Virginia in May 1861, Confederate authorities began to court him over the use of his mill (the largest in Loudoun County). An erstwhile Quaker with considerable interests in loyal Maryland, Means was a unionist and would have none of it. Consequently, the Confederates issued warrants for his arrest forcing Means to flee to Maryland on July 1, 1861, leaving his family behind. Subsequent to his fleeing, the Confederate government seized all his property and assets in Virginia, including 28 horses, 42 hogs, 2 wagons all the flour and meal at his mill.

When Union forces under John Geary invaded Loudoun in March 1862, Means served as a scout for the force. For his service, Secretary of War Edwin M. Stanton issued him a captaincy with permission to raise a company of cavalry for border service in Loudoun and Maryland. The resulting Loudoun Rangers served as partisans in Loudoun for much of the war but were eventually mustered into regular service leading to Means' departure from the unit over the issue in 1864.

He died on March 2, 1884, at the age of 56.
