= Waterford, Virginia =

Unincorporated community in Virginia, United States

- Census-designated place
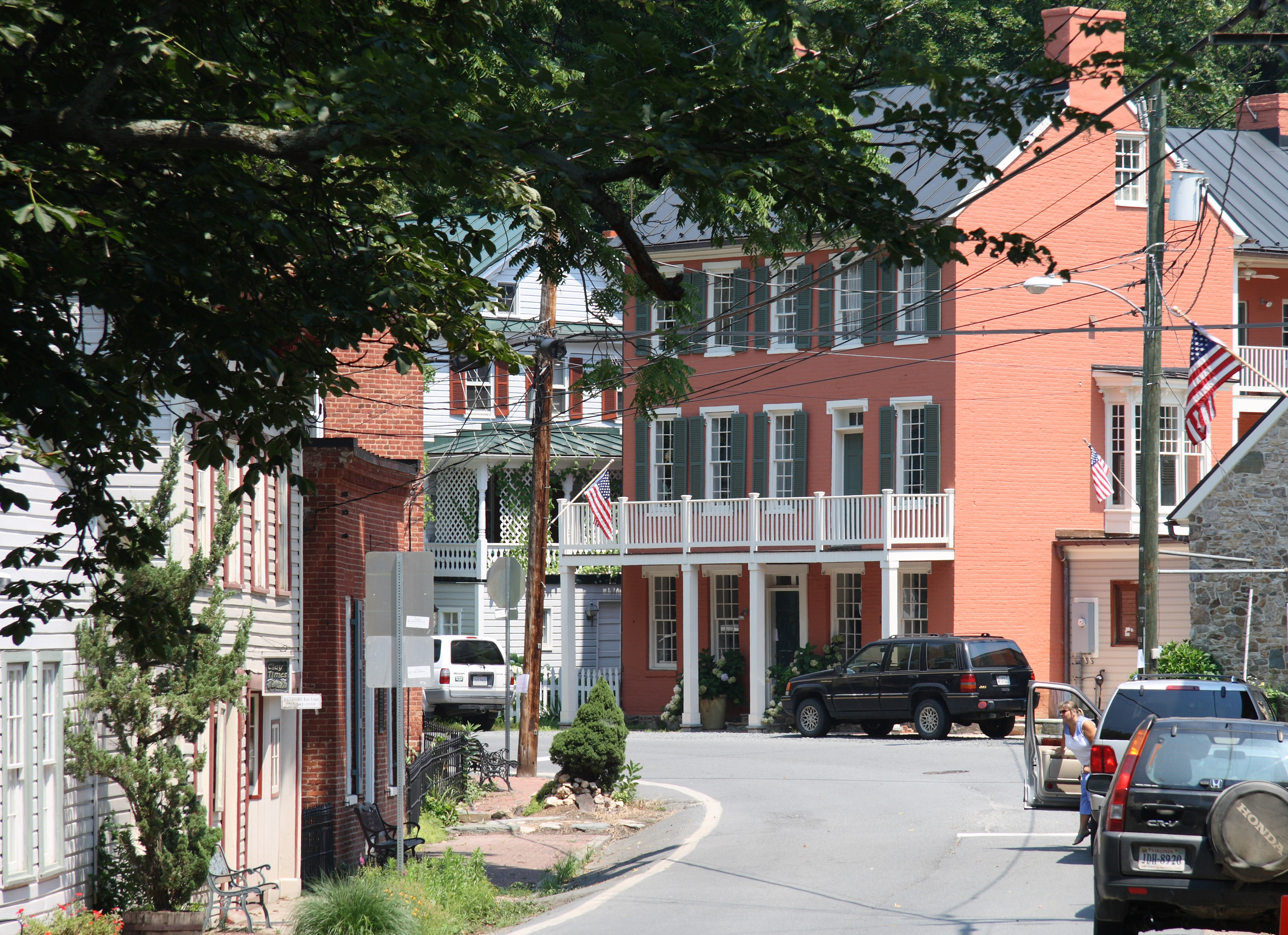
- The Waterford town center in July 2008

- Location within Northern Virginia Location within Virginia Location within the United States
- Coordinates: 39°11′12″N 77°36′36″W
- Country: United States
- State: Virginia
- County: Loudoun

Area
  - Total: 0.36 sq mi (0.94 km^{2})
  - Land: 0.36 sq mi (0.94 km^{2})
  - Water: 0 sq mi (0.0 km^{2})
- Time zone: UTC−5 (Eastern (EST))
  - Summer (DST): UTC−4 (EDT)
- ZIP code: 20197
- FIPS code: 51-83440
- GNIS feature ID: 2807429

- Waterford Historic District
- U.S. National Register of Historic Places
- U.S. National Historic Landmark District
- Virginia Landmarks Register
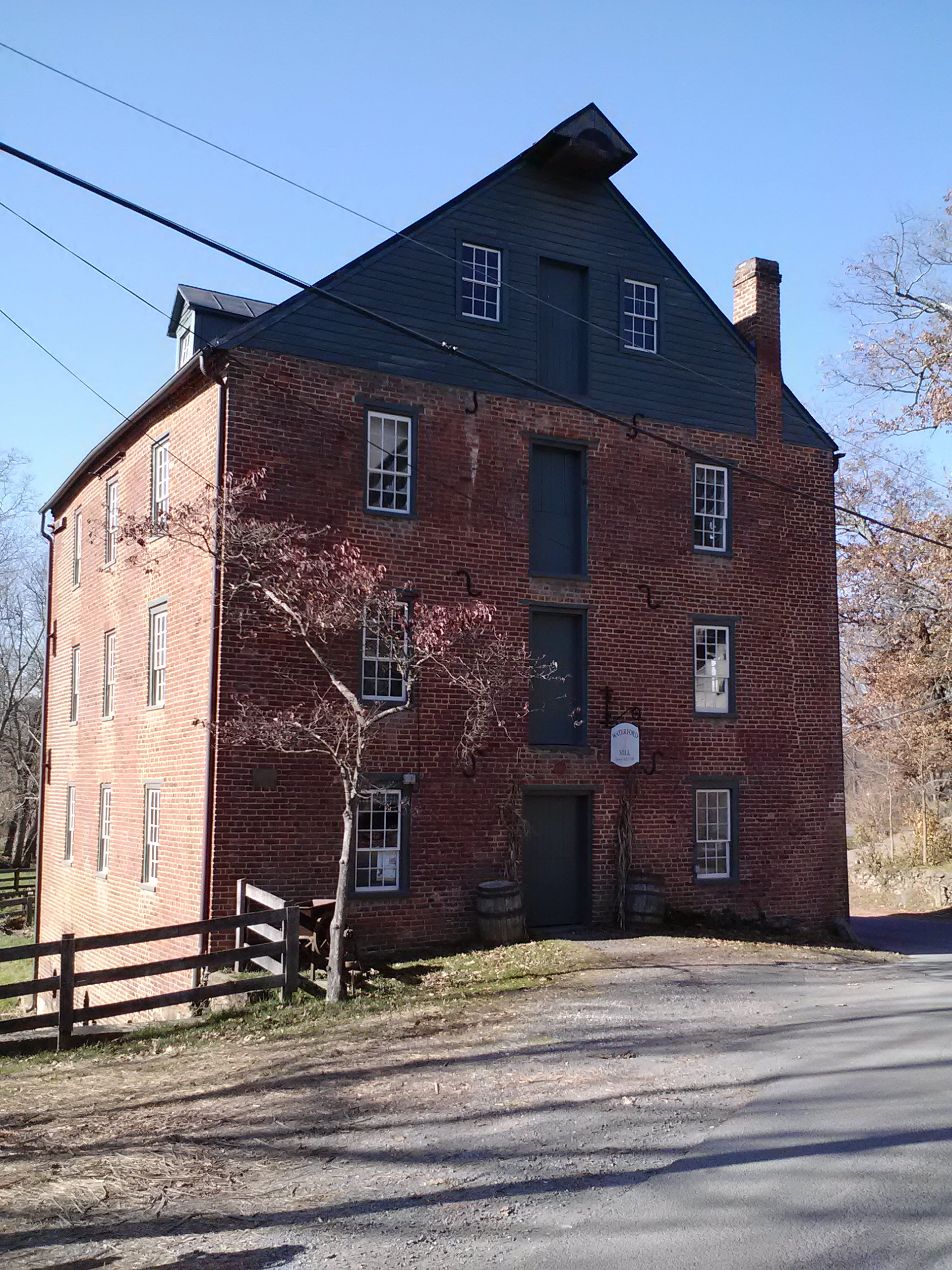
- The Waterford Mill
- NRHP reference No.: 69000256
- VLR No.: 401-0123

Significant dates
- Added to NRHP: June 3, 1969
- Designated NHLD: April 15, 1970
- Designated VLR: May 13, 1969

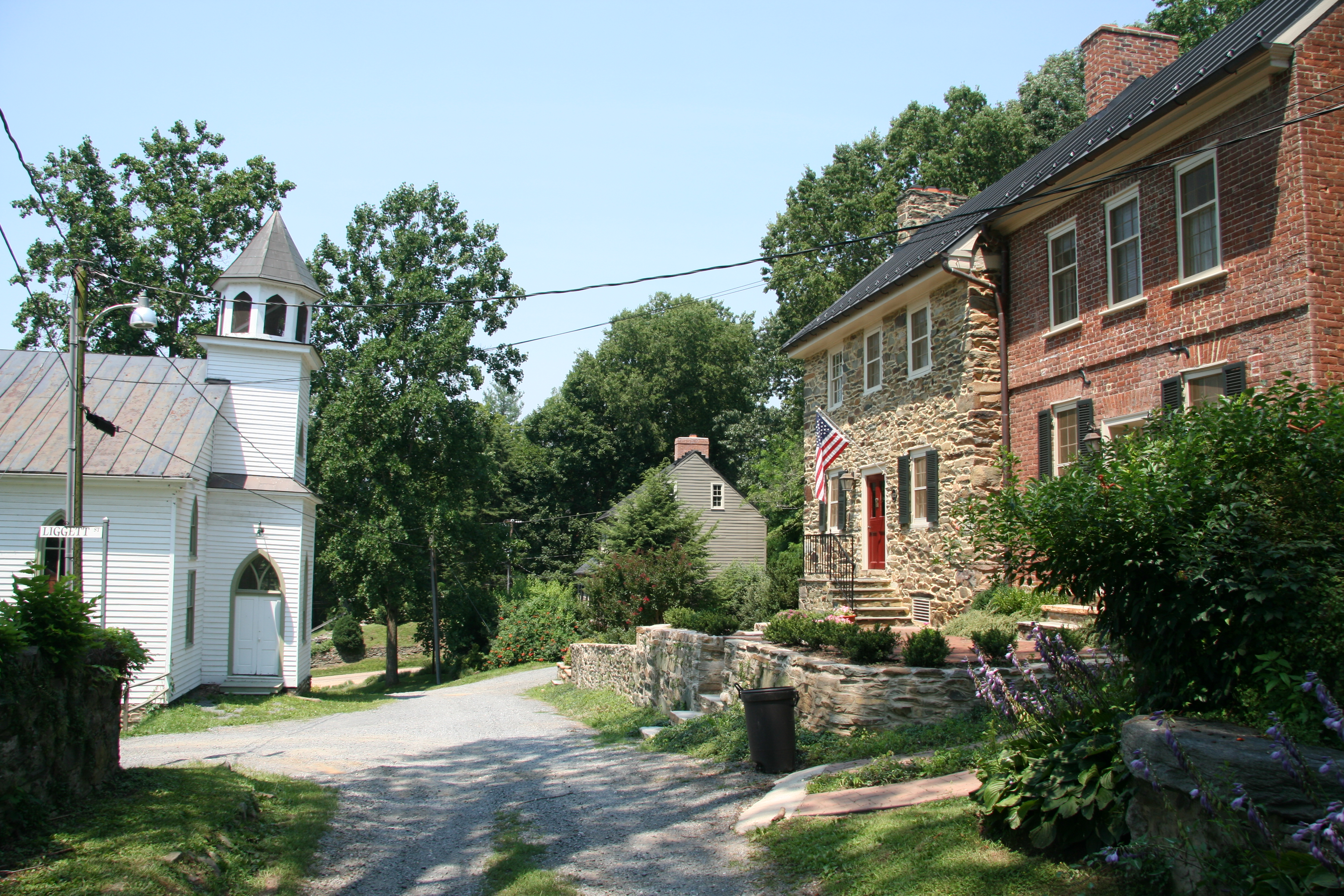
The intersection of Bond Street and Liggett Street in Waterford

Waterford is a historic village located in western Loudoun County, Virginia, United States. Waterford lies forty-seven miles northwest of Washington, D.C. and seven miles northwest of Leesburg. In 1970, the village was designated a National Historic Landmark District in recognition of its well-preserved eighteenth- and nineteenth-century character. As of the 2020 census, Waterford had a population of 181.

In the 1810 United States census, the population center of the United States was recorded as being just northwest of the village.

== History ==
=== 18th century ===
Waterford was established around 1733 by Amos Janney, a Quaker from Bucks County, Pennsylvania. Janney purchased 400 acres (1.6 km^{2}) on the south fork of Catoctin Creek and established a grist mill and saw mill in the area in the 1740s. Due to the success of the mills, the settlement became known as "Janney's Mill." The town grew quickly as a center of commerce for growers of grain.

Amos Janney died in 1747, leaving his estate to his sixteen-year-old son, Mahlon, who replaced the original log mill with a two-story structure. The village continued to grow, and in 1780, twelve acres on the south side of Main Street were subdivided into fifteen lots, upon which shops and homes were built. By the 1790s, the village was known as "Waterford," named after the city of Waterford in Ireland, where some of its founders had once lived before immigrating to the United States. New residents continued to come from Pennsylvania, as Quakers were followed by Presbyterians, Lutherans, Baptists, and Methodists. Waterford was also populated by African Americans, both free and enslaved.

=== 19th century ===
==== Civil War ====
By the start of the Civil War, the population of Waterford remained largely Quaker. As pacifists and abolitionists, the Quakers remained loyal to the Union throughout the war. Waterford was the scene of a fierce fight between the county's Union and Confederate forces, the Loudoun Rangers and White's Rebels, respectively. Waterford was then populated predominantly by Quakers, who helped slaves escape to the North.

=== 20th century ===
With the town falling into disrepair in the early part of the twentieth century, the Waterford Foundation was formed in 1944 to help save and preserve Waterford and its history. In 1974, the Waterford Foundation helped create an innovative land preservation program in which the historic properties of Waterford are protected through open space and façade easements. More than sixty easements have been granted.

The Waterford Foundation hosts the Waterford Fair annually, and the fair marked its 80th anniversary in 2024. The fair mainly revolves around celebrating the history, art, and culture of the town, which is encapsulated in the fair's motto, "An Autumn Celebration of Americana." Elements of the Waterford Fair include a historic homes and gardens tour, demonstrating artisans in traditional mediums, live music, and living history exhibits.

The town is largely residential, although a number of businesses are based in the village. The Loudoun Mutual Insurance Company has been located in Waterford since 1849.

== National Historic Landmarks ==
The village was listed as a Virginia Historic Landmark in 1969.

In 1970, Waterford and a significant portion of its surrounding countryside were declared a National Historic Landmark, the highest designation of historic significance possible in the United States, placing Waterford on the same level of significance as Independence Hall, Mount Vernon, Colonial Williamsburg, and other locations with this designation. The designation was made in recognition of the town's well-preserved 18th- and 19th-century architecture and landscape. Significant buildings include the mill (circa 1750), Arch House Row (circa 1750), Camelot School (circa 1800), the Hague-Hough house, which is Waterford's oldest house (circa 1740), and the 1882 Presbyterian church.

Catoctin Creek Bridge was listed on the National Register of Historic Places in 1974, and the William Virts House was listed in 2011.

== Demographics ==
Waterford first appeared as a census designated place in the 2020 U.S. census.

== See also ==
- List of National Historic Landmarks in Virginia
- National Register of Historic Places listings in Loudoun County, Virginia
