= 2nd Virginia Cavalry Regiment =

Confederate States Army unit

- Flag of Virginia, 1861
- Active: May 1861 – April 1865
- Disbanded: April 1865
- Allegiance: Confederate States of America
- Branch: Confederate States Army
- Type: Regiment
- Role: Cavalry
- Engagements: First Battle of Manassas; Jackson's Valley Campaign; Seven Days' Battles; Second Battle of Manassas; Battle of Sharpsburg; Battle of Fredericksburg; Battle of Chancellorsville; Battle of Brandy Station; Battle of Gettysburg; Bristoe Campaign; Overland Campaign; Siege of Petersburg; Valley Campaigns of 1864; Appomattox Campaign; Battle of Five Forks

Commanders
- Notable commanders: Col. Richard C.W. Radford; Col. Thomas T. Munford

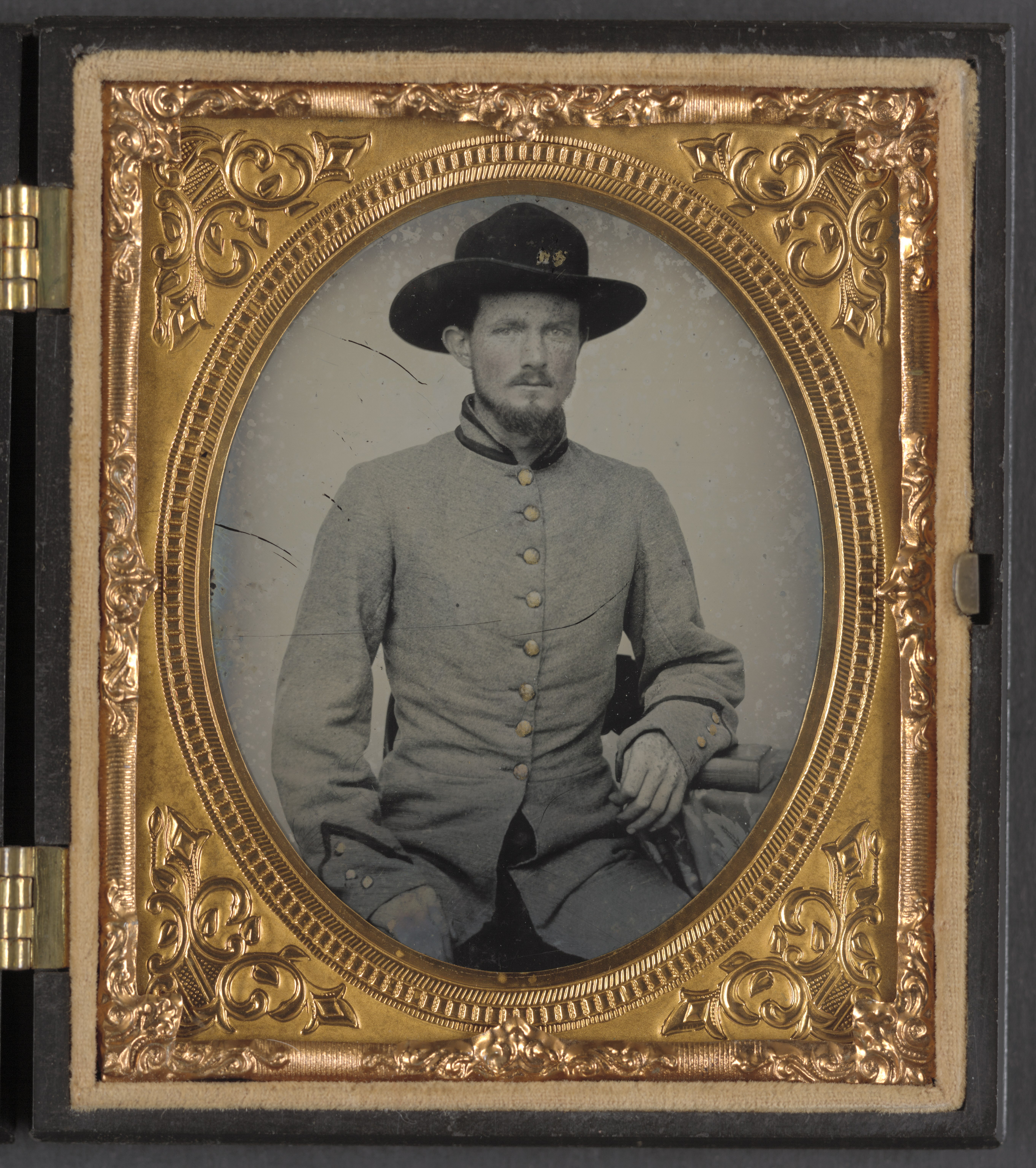
Private Peter H. Bird of Co. D, 2nd Virginia Cavalry Regiment

The 2nd Virginia Cavalry Regiment was a cavalry regiment raised in Virginia for service in the Confederate States Army during the American Civil War. It fought mostly with the Army of Northern Virginia.

The unit was organized by Colonel Jubal Early in Lynchburg, Virginia, in May, 1861 as the 30th Virginia Volunteer Regiment under Col. Richard C.W. Radford (whence "Radford's Rangers"—not to be confused with Troop G's similar nickname). Its troops (the cavalry equivalent of infantry companies) were recruited across several counties of Central Virginia:

Troop: Nickname	Captain	Mustered
A: Bedford's "Clay Dragoons"	William R. Terry	11 May 1861
B: Lynchburg's "Wise Troop"	John S. Langhorne	13 May 1861
C: "The Botetourt Dragoons"	Andrew L. Pitzer	20 May 1861
D: "The Franklin Rangers"	Giles W.B. Hale	22 May 1861
E: "The Amherst Mounted Rangers"	Thomas Whitehead	29 May 1861
F: "The Bedford Southside Dragoons"	James Wilson	31 May 1861
G: Bedford's "Radford Rangers"	Edmund W. Radford	29 May 1861
H: "The Appomattox Rangers"	Joel L. Flood	3 June 1861
I: "The Campbell Rangers"	John D. Alexander	8 June 1861
K: "The Albemarle Light Horse"	Eugene Davis	11 May 1861

At the end of October, 1861 the unit was re-designated the 2nd Virginia Cavalry Regiment.

During the war it was brigaded under Generals B.H. Robertson, Fitzhugh Lee, W.C. Wickham, and Thomas Munford. The 2nd Cavalry saw action at First Bull Run, in Jackson's Valley Campaign, and at Second Bull Run, Mile Hill, Antietam, Fredericksburg, Kelly's Ford, Chancellorsville, Brandy Station, Aldie, Upperville, Gettysburg, and Shepherdstown. After the Bristoe and Mine Run campaigns, it was involved at The Wilderness, Todd's Tavern, Spotsylvania, Haw's Shop, and Cold Harbor. It fought in the Shenandoah Valley with Jubal Early and later in numerous conflicts around Petersburg and Appomattox.

The regiment contained 676 men in July, 1861, lost twenty-eight percent of the 163 engaged at Groveton Heights, and of the 385 at Gettysburg about four percent were disabled. At Appomattox it cut through the Federal lines and disbanded at Lynchburg on April 10, 1865. However, 19 men were included in the surrender.

The field officers were Colonels Richard C.W. Radford and Thomas T. Munford, Lieutenant Colonels Cary Breckinridge and James W. Watts, and Major William F. Graves.

Future Commonwealth's Attorney and Virginia Bar Association President Micajah Woods enlisted in the 2nd Virginia Cavalry. Woods was the prosecuting attorney in the trial of Charlottesville mayor J. Samuel McCue, the last man to be hanged in Virginia.

Thomas Whitehead, the future one-term Representative of Virginia's 6th Congressional District to the House of Representatives, was the captain of Company E.

The flag of the Botetourt Dragoons was conserved by the United Daughters of the Confederacy Chapter 797 when it was listed as one of the top 12 flags needing conservation at the Museum of the Confederacy. The flag was constructed in 1861 when the Fincastle, Virginia unit rode off to war. The silk flag was used by the unit for two years, and the flag bearer, Rufus H. Peck, presented the flag to the Museum of the Confederacy in 1907.

== See also ==
- List of Virginia Civil War units
