= 1st Maryland Cavalry Battalion, Potomac Home Brigade =

1st Potomac Home Brigade Cavalry
- Flag of Maryland
- Active: August 1861 to June 1865
- Country: United States of America
- Allegiance: Union
- Branch: Cavalry
- Type: Partisan
- Size: 12 companies
- Engagements: American Civil War

Commanders
- 1st: Henry A. Cole

1st Maryland Cavalry Battalion, Potomac Home Brigade, originally organized as the 1st Potomac Home Brigade Cavalry, "Cole's Cavalry" was formed under the guidance of Henry A. Cole (from Frederick, Maryland). There are also references to it being designated as Cole's 1st Volunteer Maryland Cavalry. The unit, a battalion, originally consisted of four companies, A, B, C & D and was initially enlisted between August 10 and November 27, 1861.

== Organization and History ==
Company A was made-up of men mostly from Frederick, Maryland and the surrounding area and was initially commanded by Cole; B was recruited from the western part of Maryland (Hagerstown, Clear Spring, Cumberland, etc.) and was commanded by Capt. William Firey; C was recruited primarily from Emmitsburg, Maryland and Gettysburg, Pennsylvania and was commanded by Capt. John Horner; and D was made-up of men mostly from Baltimore City and Howard County, Maryland, and was commanded by Capt. Pearce K. Curll.

Company B served, through March 1863, independent of the battalion, mostly in West Virginia, western Maryland, and the northern part of the Shenandoah Valley. The company was present in action as South Branch Bridge, West Virginia (October 26, 1861) and at the Battle of Kernstown (March 22, 1862), and spent much of 1862 in the area of Romney, West Virginia, on duty as a scouting force. They were in action again at Grass Lick, West Virginia, on April 23, 1862, and at Wardensville, West Virginia, on May 7, 1862. The company regularly served along with Colonel Andrew Thomas McReynolds’ Cavalry [the 1st New York "Lincoln" Cavalry]. It joined General Jacob Dolson Cox’s Brigade in pursuit of J.E.B. Stuart, during his October 1862 raid into Pennsylvania. For the balance of the year, through early 1863, the company operated along the Chesapeake and Ohio Canal and around Martinsburg, West Virginia.

Companies A, C, and D of the battalion served initially as an unattached unit of the Dept. of West Virginia, to January, 1862, and were later in the service of Frederick W. Lander's Division. The list of engagements for these three companies is extensive and includes, Hancock, Md. (January 5–6, 1862), Bloomery Gap (February 14, 1862), the advance on Winchester (March 2–12), Martinsburg, West Virginia (March 3, 1862), Bunker Hill (this was just Co. A), West Virginia (March 5, 1862), action between Bunker Hill and Winchester (March 7, 1862), Stephenson's Depot (March 7–8), Winchester (March 12, 1862), Kernstown (March 22, 1862), Winchester (March 23, 1862), Edinburg, Va. (April 1), and Charles Town, West Virginia (May 28).

On paper, the companies were consolidated into a Battalion on August 1, 1862, and designated as Cole's Battalion, Potomac Home Brigade Cavalry, Capt. Henry Cole receiving the rank of major. At that time, with Cole's promotion, Lt. George W.F. Vernon was raised to command of Company A, with the rank of captain. Despite the consolidation, Company B continued to operate independently of the battalion through March 1863. Meanwhile, Cole's Battalion continued to see regular and active service, participating in action at the Battle of Mile Hill, Leesburg, Va., September 2, 1862; Edwards' Ferry, Md., September 4; Monocacy Creek September 4; Reconnaissance to Lovettsville September 4; Maryland Heights and siege of Harper's Ferry, West Virginia September 12–14 (when the battalion led the way in cutting through enemy lines and evading capture). During the escape from Harpers Ferry, Cole's Battalion encountered and captured Confederate Gen. James Longstreet's ammunition train at Sharpsburg, Maryland, on September 15.

The battalion participated in harassing Gen. J.E.B. Stuart in his raid into Pennsylvania and engaged portions of the Confederate cavalry force at Hyattstown, Md. on October 12. After that, the battalion saw action at Charles Town, November 14; Berryville, December 1; Charles Town, December 2; Winchester, December 5; Halltown, December 20.

After Company B rejoined the battalion on March 21, 1863, at Kearneysville, West Virginia, the battalion, for the first time a complete force, participated later that spring at Charles Town, May 16; Berryville, June 13; Martinsburg, June 14; Winchester, June 15 (Co. B); Williamsport, June 15; Catoctin Creek, June 17; Frederick, Md., June 21; Sharpsburg, July; Fountain Dale, Pa., July; Gettysburg, Pennsylvania, July 1–3; near Emmittsburg, July 4; Falling Waters, July 6; Harper's Ferry, July 6; Smithfield, August 23.

In August (26th) and September (12th-16th), the battalion sent scouts into Loudoun County, Virginia. The list of actions continues with Catoctin Mountain, September 14; Loudoun Valley, Va., September 25; Loudoun Valley and Summit Point, October 7; Charles Town, October 7 (Co. B); Snickersville, Leesburg, Rector's Cross Roads and Bloomfield, September 14; Upperville, September 25; Berryville, October 18; near Annandale, October 22; expedition from Charles Town to New Market, November 15–18; Mt. Jackson, November 16; Ashby's Gap, November; Upperville, December 10; Edinburg, December 17; New Market, December 18; Harrisonburg and Staunton, December 21.

In 1864, action against John S. Mosby's Rangers continued, the battalion engaging them at Rectortown, January 1, 1864. In the dark morning hours and freezing cold temperatures of January 10, 1864, Mosby attempted to make an attack upon the camp of Cole's Battalion at the Battle of Loudoun Heights and was soundly defeated in the effort. Following this action, the battalion was engaged at Romney, Moorefield, and Mechanicsville Gap, February 4.

On February 13, 1864, many members of the battalion reenlisted prior to going into action again at Upperville/Blackley's Grove on February 20.

The battalion was increased to a full regiment with the action of eight new companies, E, F, G, H, I, K, L, and M. Organized at Baltimore and Frederick from February 9 to April 23, 1864, elements of the new regiment participated in Gen. Franz Sigel's expedition from Martinsburg, W. Va., to New Market, Va., on April 30-May 16, and saw action at the Battle of New Market, May 13–15.

After recovering from the defeat at New Market, the regiment participated next in Gen. David Hunter's expedition to Lynchburg May 26-July 1, participating in action at Harrisonburg, June 3 and the Battle of Piedmont, June 5. After the occupation of Staunton on June 6, the regiment participated in action at Tye River, June 12; Lexington, June 13; Buckhannon, June 14; the Battle of Lynchburg, June 17–18; and the Catawba Mountains and near Salem, Va., June 21. Once back in the normal operating area around Martinsburg, the command saw action at Leetown and Shepardstown, July 3 (Detachment); Keedysville, July 5; Frederick, Md., July 11–12; Maryland Heights, Brownsville, Crampton's Gap and Herndon July ---; Purcelleville, July 16; Snicker's Ferry, July 17–18; Ashby's Gap and Winchester, July 19; Kernstown, July 23–24; Winchester, Bunker Hill, and Martinsburg, July 25; Snicker's Gap, July 25; Falling Waters, July 26; Hagerstown, July 29–30; Keedysville, August 5; Winchester, August 17; Opequan Creek, August 18, 19 and 20; near Berryville, August 21; near Charles Town, August 21–22; Antietam, August 22; Williamsport, August 26; Summit Point, August 30; White Post, September 3; Winchester, September 19; Fisher's Hill, September 22; and the Battle of Cedar Creek, October 19.

Following the defeat of Jubal Early in the Shenandoah Valley, Cole's Regiment served on duty in West Virginia, operating against Mosby and guarding Baltimore & Ohio Railroad until June, 1865. Cole's Regiment was mustered out on June 28, 1865. In the course of its service, the regiment lost 2 officers and 45 enlisted men killed and mortally wounded, 2 officers and 120 enlisted men by disease.
