= Battle of Brandy Station order of battle: Confederate =

The following units and commanders fought in the Battle of Brandy Station of the American Civil War on the Confederate side. The Union order of battle is shown separately. Order of battle compiled from the army organization during the battle.

== Abbreviations used ==
=== Military rank ===
- MG = Major General
- BG = Brigadier General
- Col = Colonel
- Ltc = Lieutenant Colonel
- Maj = Major
- Cpt = Captain

=== Other ===
- (w) = wounded
- (k) = killed in action

== Army of Northern Virginia ==
=== Cavalry Division ===
| Division | Brigade | Regiments and Others |
|---|---|---|
| Stuart's Cavalry Division; MG James E. B. Stuart | Jones' Brigade BG William E. Jones | 6th Virginia: Col Julien Harrison (w); Maj Cabel E. Flournoy; 7th Virginia: Ltc Thomas Marshall; 11th Virginia: Col Lunsford L. Lomax; 12th Virginia: Col Asher W. Harman (w); 35th Virginia Battalion: Ltc Elijah V. White (w) |
| Stuart's Cavalry Division; MG James E. B. Stuart | William H. F. Lee's Brigade BG William H. F. Lee (w); Col James L. Davis; Col John R. Chambliss, Jr. | 2nd North Carolina: Col Solomon Williams (k), Ltc William H. F. Payne; 9th Virginia: Col Richard L. T. Beale; 10th Virginia: Col James L. Davis, Maj Joseph Rosser; 13th Virginia: Col John R. Chambliss, Jr. |
| Stuart's Cavalry Division; MG James E. B. Stuart | Hampton's Brigade BG Wade Hampton | 1st North Carolina: Col Laurence S. Baker; 1st South Carolina: Col John L. Black; 2nd South Carolina: Col Matthew C. Butler (w), Ltc Frank Hampton (k), Maj Thomas J. Lipscomb; Cobb's (Georgia) Legion: Col Pierce M. B. Young (w); Jeff. Davis (Mississippi) Legion: Ltc Joseph F. Waring |
| Stuart's Cavalry Division; MG James E. B. Stuart | Fitzhugh Lee's Brigade Col Thomas T. Munford | 1st Virginia: Col James H. Drake; 2nd Virginia: Ltc James W. Watts; 3rd Virginia: Col Thomas H. Owen; 4th Virginia: Col Williams C. Wickham |
| Stuart's Cavalry Division; MG James E. B. Stuart | Robertson's Brigade BG Beverly H. Robertson | 4th North Carolina: Col Dennis D. Ferebee; 5th North Carolina: Col Peter G. Evans |
| Stuart's Cavalry Division; MG James E. B. Stuart | Stuart's Horse Artillery Maj Robert F. Beckham | Hart's (South Carolina) Battery: Cpt James F. Hart; Breathed's (Virginia) Battery: Cpt James Breathed; Chew's (Virginia) Battery: Cpt Roger P. Chew; Moorman's (Virginia) Battery: Cpt Marcellus N. Moorman; McGregor's (Virginia) Battery: Cpt William M. McGregor |
