= Battle of Brandy Station order of battle: Union =

The following units and commanders fought in the Battle of Brandy Station of the American Civil War on the Union side. The Confederate order of battle is shown separately. Order of battle compiled from the army organization during the battle.

== Abbreviations used ==
=== Military rank ===
- BG = Brigadier General
- Col = Colonel
- Ltc = Lieutenant Colonel
- Maj = Major
- Cpt = Captain
- Lt = Lieutenant

=== Other ===
- w = wounded
- mw = mortally wounded
- k = killed in action
- c = captured

== Cavalry Corps, Army of the Potomac ==
BG Alfred Pleasonton

=== Right Wing ===
BG John Buford

Division	Brigade	Regiments and Others
First Division; BG John Buford; Col Thomas C. Devin	1st Brigade Col Benjamin F. Davis (k); Maj William S. McClure	8th New York: Maj Edmund M. Pope; 8th Illinois: Cpt Alpheus Clark (mw), Cpt George A. Forsyth (w); 3rd Indiana (battalion): Maj William S. McClure, Maj Charles Lemmon; 9th New York (Five companies): Maj William B. Martin (w), Cpt Conway W. Ayres; 3rd West Virginia (Two companies): Cpt Seymour B. Conger
First Division; BG John Buford; Col Thomas C. Devin	2nd Brigade Col Thomas C. Devin; Col. Josiah H. Kellogg	6th New York: Maj William E. Beardsley; 17th Pennsylvania: Col Josiah H. Kellogg
	Reserve Brigade Maj Charles J. Whiting	1st United States: Cpt Richard S. C. Lord; 2nd United States: Cpt Wesley Merritt; 5th United States: Cpt James E. Harrison; 6th United States: Cpt George C. Cram; 6th Pennsylvania: Maj Robert Morris, Jr. (c), Maj Henry C. Wheelan
	Attached Infantry Brigade BG Adelbert Ames	86th New York: Maj Jacob H. Lansing; 124th New York: Ltc Francis M. Cummins; 2nd Massachusetts: Ltc Charles R. Mudge; 33rd Massachusetts: Col Adin B. Underwood; 3rd Wisconsin: Ltc Martin Flood
	Horse Artillery Cpt James M. Robertson	1st United States, Battery K: Cpt William M. Graham; 2nd United States, Batteries B and L: Lt Edward Heaton; 4th United States, Battery E: Lt Samuel S. Elder

=== Left Wing ===
BG David McM. Gregg

Division	Brigade	Regiments and Others
Second Division; Col Alfred N. Duffié	1st Brigade Col Luigi P. Di Cesnola	1st Massachusetts: Ltc Greely S. Curtis; 6th Ohio: Maj William Stedman; 1st Rhode Island: Ltc John L. Thompson
Second Division; Col Alfred N. Duffié	2nd Brigade Col John I. Gregg	3rd Pennsylvania: Ltc Edward S. Jones; 4th Pennsylvania: Ltc William E. Doster; 16th Pennsylvania: Cpt John K. Robison; 2nd United States Artillery, Battery M: Lt Alexander C. M. Pennington, Jr.
Third Division; BG David McM. Gregg	1st Brigade Col Judson Kilpatrick	2nd New York: Ltc Henry E. Davies, Jr.; 10th New York: Ltc William Irvine (c), Maj Matthew H. Avery; 1st Maine: Col Calvin S. Douty; Orton's Company District of Columbia: Cpt William H. Orton
Third Division; BG David McM. Gregg	2nd Brigade Col Percy Wyndham (w); Col John P. Taylor	1st New Jersey: Ltc Virgil Brodrick (k), Maj John H. Shelmire (k), Maj Myron H. Beaumont; 1st Pennsylvania: Col John P. Taylor, Ltc David Gardner; 1st Maryland: Ltc James M. Deems; New York Light Artillery, 6th Battery: Cpt Joseph W. Martin
	Attached Infantry Brigade BG David A. Russell	2nd Wisconsin (2 companies); 7th Wisconsin: Col William Robinson; 56th Pennsylvania: Col John William Hofmann; 81st Pennsylvania; 119th Pennsylvania: Maj Henry P. Truefitt, Jr.; 5th New Hampshire: Col Edward E. Cross; 6th Maine: Col Hiram Burnham; 3rd United States Artillery, Battery C: Lt William D. Fuller
