= Battle of Brandy Station order of battle =

The order of battle for the Battle of Brandy Station includes:

- Battle of Brandy Station order of battle: Confederate
- Battle of Brandy Station order of battle: Union
