= Battle of Hanover =

Battle of the American Civil War

Coordinates: 39.80099°N 76.98247°W

- Part of the American Civil War
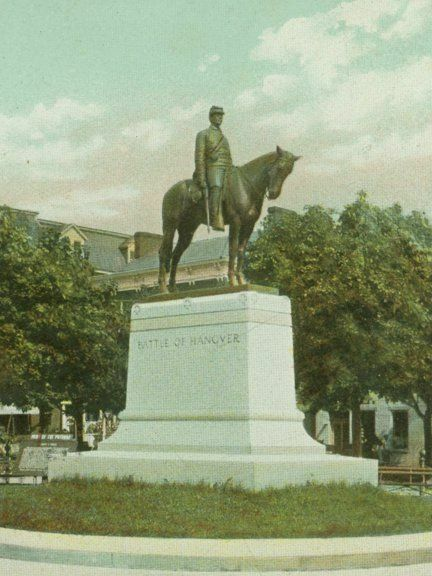
- The Picket, a commemorative statue in Hanover's Center Square; sculpted by Cyrus E. Dallin.
Date	June 30, 1863
Location	Hanover, Pennsylvania
Result	Inconclusive

Belligerents
United States (Union)	(Confederate States of America) CSA (Confederacy)

Commanders and leaders
Judson Kilpatrick	J.E.B. Stuart

Strength
~5,000	~6,000

Casualties and losses
215	117

The Battle of Hanover took place on June 30, 1863, in Hanover in southwestern York County, Pennsylvania, as part of the Gettysburg campaign of the American Civil War.

Maj. Gen. J.E.B. Stuart's Confederate cavalry, which was riding north to get around the Union Army of the Potomac, attacked a Federal cavalry regiment, driving it through the streets of Hanover. Brig. Gen. Elon Farnsworth's brigade arrived and counterattacked, routing the Confederate vanguard and nearly capturing Stuart himself. Stuart soon counterattacked. Reinforced by Brig. Gen. George A. Custer's Michigan Brigade, Farnsworth held his ground, and a stalemate ensued. Stuart was forced to continue north and east to get around the Union cavalry, further delaying his attempt to rejoin Robert E. Lee's army, which was then concentrating at Cashtown Gap west of Gettysburg.

== Background ==
As Robert E. Lee moved his Army of Northern Virginia northward in June 1863 through the Shenandoah Valley toward Pennsylvania, portions of his cavalry under J.E.B. Stuart slipped eastward across the path of the Union Army of the Potomac. A series of raids in eastern Maryland netted prisoners and supplies, disrupting Federal communications and telegraph lines. However, Stuart was not able to effectively screen Lee's advance or provide intelligence on the movements of the Federal army. As Stuart headed north intending to link with Lee, Union cavalry commander Maj. Gen. Alfred Pleasonton, riding toward Pennsylvania to the west of Stuart, ordered his divisions to fan out across a wide swath, keeping an eye out for Confederates.

Brig. Gen. Judson Kilpatrick's division was on the Union right flank. Most of his men passed through Hanover early in the morning of June 30, pausing briefly for refreshments and to receive the greetings of the jubilant townspeople. Their town had been raided three days before by Confederate Lt. Col. Elijah V. White's cavalry, attached to Maj. Gen. Jubal Early's division that had occupied York County. White's Virginians and Marylanders had followed the railroad to Hanover from nearby Gettysburg, and taken horses, food, supplies, clothing, shoes, and other desired items from the townspeople, often paying with valueless Confederate money or drafts on the Confederate government. White's raiders had destroyed the area's telegraph wires, cutting off communications with the outside world, before sacking the nearby Hanover Junction train station. The unexpected arrival of Kilpatrick's column was a pleasant surprise to the residents of Hanover, who warmly greeted the Union troopers with food and drink.

Most of Kilpatrick's men remounted and passed through town, heading northward through the nearby Pigeon Hills toward Abbottstown. He left behind a small rear guard force to picket the roads south and west of Hanover. In the meantime, Stuart had left his billet at Shriver's Corner, Maryland, and was proceeding northward across the Mason–Dixon line into Pennsylvania. Hearing that Federal cavalry had been spotted near his intended destination, Littlestown, Pennsylvania, he instead turned toward Hanover in adjacent York County. His progress was slowed considerably by a cumbersome train of over 125 heavily laden supply wagons he had captured near Rockville, Maryland. In addition, he had skirmished with Delaware cavalry on June 29 at Westminster, Maryland, further delaying him.

== Battle ==
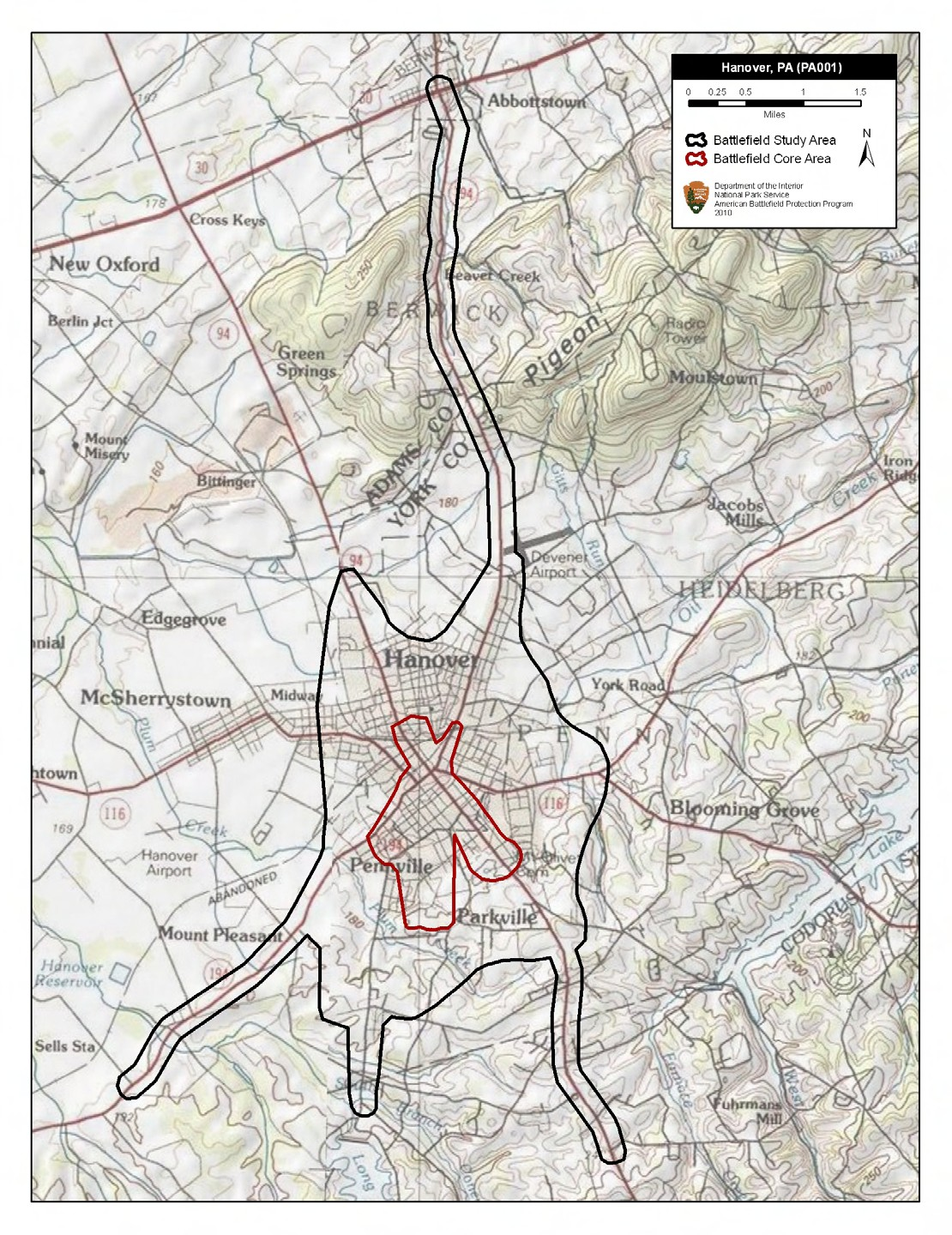
Map of Hanover Battlefield core and study areas by the American Battlefield Protection Program.

Shortly before 10:00 a.m. on June 30, the rear guard of the 18th Pennsylvania Cavalry encountered Confederate videttes about three miles (5 km) southwest of Hanover at Gitt's Mill. In the ensuing exchange of small arms fire, a Confederate cavalryman died, and several were wounded. Shortly afterward, 25 men from Company G of the 18th Pennsylvania were captured by the 13th Virginia from John R. Chambliss's brigade, the vanguard of Stuart's oncoming cavalry. Also that morning, a series of minor engagements occurred near Littlestown and elsewhere along Stuart's path.

Southwest of Hanover at a tiny hamlet now known as Pennville, the 2nd North Carolina Cavalry struck the 18th Pennsylvania's central column and split it in two. Union survivors retired in disorder through the streets of Hanover just as Stuart's horse artillery arrived, unlimbered, and opened fire. As the Confederates occupied the town in the wake of the fleeing Pennsylvanians, General Farnsworth wheeled the 5th New York Cavalry into position near the town commons and attacked the Rebel flank in the streets, forcing the Tar Heels to abandon their brief hold on the town. The commander of the 2nd North Carolina, William Henry Fitzhugh Payne, was captured after his dying horse pitched him into a nearby tanning vat. A Union soldier pulled Payne out and took him prisoner.

As more of Chambliss's men (and General Stuart) arrived on the scene, they were met by additional Federals near the sprawling Karle Forney farm, just south of Hanover. Nearly surrounded in the confused fighting, Stuart and a staff officer escaped cross-country through the hedges bordering the country lane, at one point leaping their horses over a 15-foot (4.6 m) wide ditch. Hearing the unmistakable sound of distant gunfire, Judson Kilpatrick raced southward toward Hanover, with his horse dying in the town square from the severe ride. The young general began to deploy his men in and around Hanover, barricading some streets with barrels, farm wagons, dry goods boxes, and anything else that might provide cover. Shortly before noon, fighting at the Forney farm ceased as the Rebels broke off contact. Kilpatrick positioned Custer's newly arrived brigade on the farm and awaited developments.

When Fitzhugh Lee's Virginia brigade arrived, Stuart moved his and Chambliss's men into a new position on a ridge extending from the Keller Farm southwest of Hanover to Mount Olivet Cemetery southeast of town. In the meantime, Kilpatrick repositioned the brigades of the newly promoted duo of Custer and Farnsworth to form a better defensive perimeter and then brought up his guns.

Leaving the captured wagons two miles (3 km) south of town under heavy guard, Wade Hampton at 2 p.m. brought his brigade and Breathed's Battery into position near the Mount Olivet Cemetery on the extreme right of Stuart's line. An artillery duel ensued for two hours as opposing cannons hurtled shells over the town. Fragments blasted holes in several houses and narrowly missed killing Mrs. Henry Winebrenner and her daughter, who had just left their balcony when a projectile came hurtling through the upstairs.

During the prolonged artillery exchange, Custer's dismounted 6th Michigan moved forward to within 300 yards (270 m) of Chambliss and the two guns supporting his line. Flanked and losing fifteen men as prisoners, the Wolverines tried again. They succeeded in securing the Littlestown-Frederick Road, opening a line of communication with the Union XII Corps. Stuart and Kilpatrick made no further aggressive moves, and both sides initiated a series of skirmishes and minor probing actions.

== Aftermath ==
Disengaging slowly and protecting his captured wagons, Stuart withdrew to the northeast through Jefferson toward York, known from recent newspapers to be the location of Early's division. En route, Stuart heard at New Salem that Early's Division had recently left York and marched northwest through Dover. Stuart changed course and headed northward through the night on winding, hilly country roads, still trying to locate Early or Lt. Gen. Richard S. Ewell, thinking the latter still to be toward the Susquehanna River.

The head of Stuart's seventeen-mile (27 km) long column arrived in Dover at 2:00 a.m. on the morning of July 1, with the rear guard there by 8:00 a.m. Stuart learned that Early had passed through town and was heading westward toward Shippensburg as the army concentrated. Stuart paroled over 200 Union prisoners and gave his troopers a much-needed six-hour rest (while unknown to Stuart, Maj. Gen. Henry Heth's Confederate infantry division collided with Brig. Gen. John Buford's Union cavalry at Gettysburg). Stuart resumed his exhausting march through the afternoon and early evening, seizing over 1,000 fresh horses from York County farmers.

Leaving Hampton's Brigade and the wagons at Dillsburg, Stuart headed for Carlisle, hoping to find Ewell. Instead, Stuart found nearly 3,000 Pennsylvania and New York militia occupying the borough. After lobbing a few shells into town during the early evening and burning the Carlisle Barracks, Stuart withdrew after midnight to the south toward Gettysburg (see Skirmish at Carlisle). The fighting at Hanover, the long march through York County with the captured wagons, and the brief encounter at Carlisle slowed Stuart considerably in his attempt to rejoin the main army and locate Lee. The "eyes and ears" of the Army of Northern Virginia had failed Lee.

Losses at Hanover were relatively light in terms of casualties, but the time required to delay Stuart from linking with Lee proved even more costly. Estimates vary as to the number of men lost at Hanover; Union losses in one source are listed as 19 killed, 73 wounded, and 123 missing (for a total of 215). The 18th Pennsylvania had suffered the most, with three men killed, 24 wounded, and 57 missing. On the Confederate side, Stuart's losses are generally estimated as 9 dead, 50 wounded, and 58 missing, for a total of 117.

== The battlefield today ==
The fighting in Hanover is commemorated by The Picket, an impressive bronze statue of a mounted cavalryman sculpted by famed Boston artist Cyrus E. Dallin. Paid for by the state of Pennsylvania, it was erected in 1905 in the center square. Two bronze plaques installed by the Federal government in 1901 bear inscriptions relating to the movements of the Army of the Potomac on June 30 and July 1, 1863. In addition, a small number of artillery pieces are located on the town's square, including serial number 1 of the Parrott Rifle—the original barrel, mounted on a reproduction carriage. A wall plaque on a modern building and a star surrounded by four horseshoes installed on the sidewalk marks the location of Custer's headquarters and the "Custer Maple," a prominent tree used by the boy general to tether his horse.

In 2005, the borough erected over a dozen wayside markers at key spots along the city streets to help interpret the battle for visitors, and three years later, the state added markers as part of the Pennsylvania Civil War Trails initiative. However, much of the open area south of town, including the Forney farm where Custer advanced, has been lost to modern development, as has the once open hills a half-mile north of Hanover Center Square where Kilpatrick's artillery deployed. Elder's four cannons were deployed along what is now Stock Street east of Carlisle Street, and Pennington's Battery was deployed along what is now 4th Street west of Carlisle Street.

The York County History Center and some local Hanover organizations sponsor guided tours of the battle sites.
