= 10th Virginia Cavalry Regiment =

- Flag of Virginia, 1861
- Active: May 1862 – April 1865
- Disbanded: April 1865
- Country: CSA
- Branch: Confederate States Army
- Type: Cavalry
- Size: Regiment
- Engagements: American Civil War: Seven Days' Battles; Second Battle of Bull Run; Battle of Antietam; Battle of Fredericksburg; Battle of Chancellorsville; Battle of Brandy Station; Battle of Gettysburg; Bristoe Campaign; Overland Campaign; Siege of Petersburg; Valley Campaigns of 1864; Appomattox Campaign

Commanders
- Notable commanders: Col. Robert A. Caskie; Col. William B. Clement; Col. J. Lucius Davis

The 10th Virginia Cavalry Regiment was a cavalry regiment raised in Virginia for service in the Confederate States Army during the American Civil War. It fought mostly with the Army of Northern Virginia.

== Organization ==
Virginia's 10th Cavalry Regiment, formerly called 1st Cavalry Regiment, Wise Legion and 8th Battalion, Virginia Cavalry, was organized in May 1862. Many of the men were from Richmond, Albemarle, Rockingham, Kanawha, Jackson and Henrico counties of Virginia.

== Service ==
The 10th Virginia Cavalry served in Hampton's, W.H.F. Lee's, Chambliss' and Beale's brigades in the Army of Northern Virginia. After fighting in the Seven Days Battles, it saw action at Antietam, Fredericksburg, Brandy Station, Upperville, Gettysburg, Bristoe, and Mine Run. It was involved in the Wilderness Campaign, the defense of Richmond and Petersburg, and the Appomattox Courthouse operations.

The regiment fought at Gettysburg at 236 soldiers strength.

== Officers ==
Its commanders were Colonels Robert A. Caskie, William B. Clement, and J. Lucius Davis; and Lieutenant Colonel Zachariah S. McGruder.

Captain William Hartman Kable of the 10th Virginia was also the founder of the Kable School, later Staunton Military Academy, many of the facilities of which are now in use by Mary Baldwin College in Staunton, Virginia.

== Surrender ==
The 10th Virginia Cavalry surrendered at Appomattox with 3 officers and 19 men; all others escaped hiding the regimental colors with the help of a local woman.

== Gallery ==
Soldiers of the 10th Virginia Cavalry

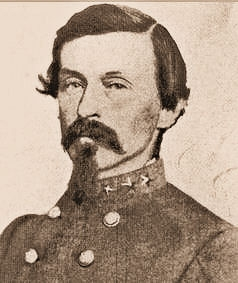
Col. Robert Alexander Caskie

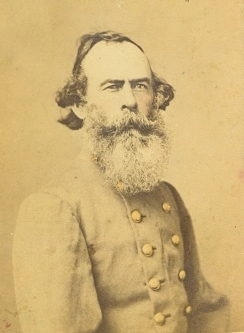
Col. James Lucius Davis Sr.

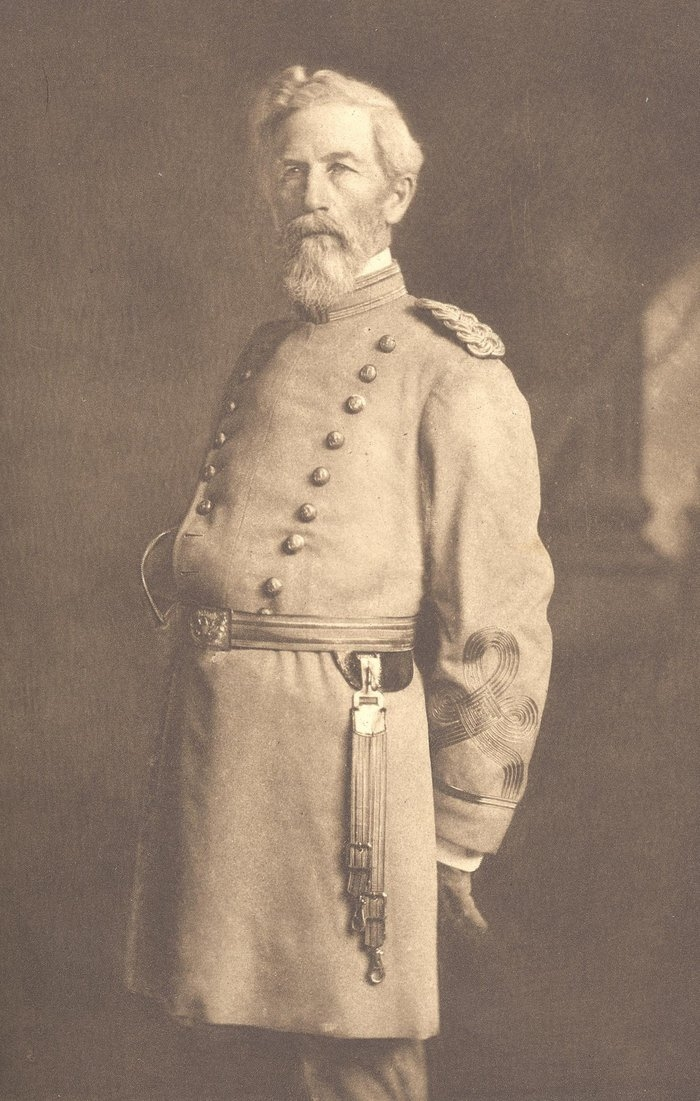
Capt. William Hartman Kable

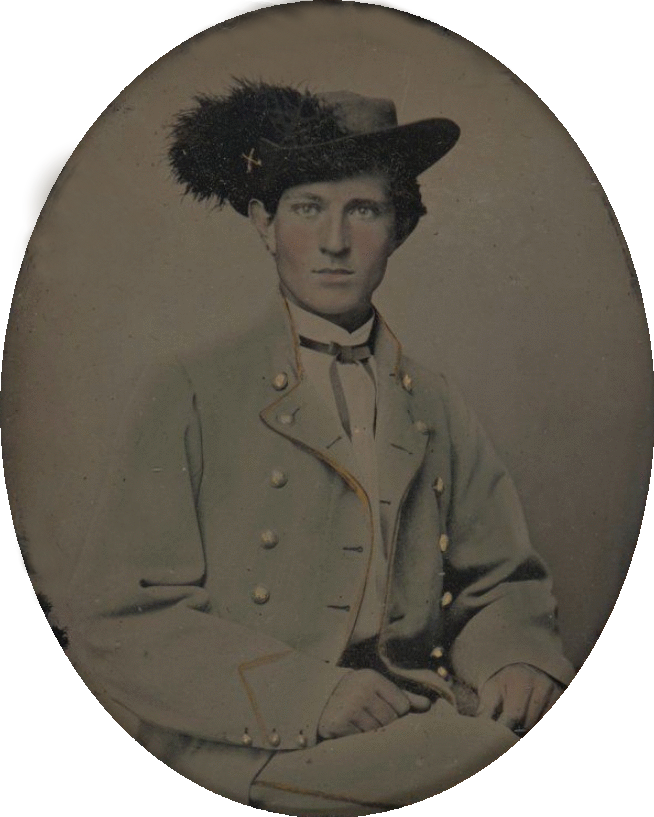
Sergeant Al. Speirs George

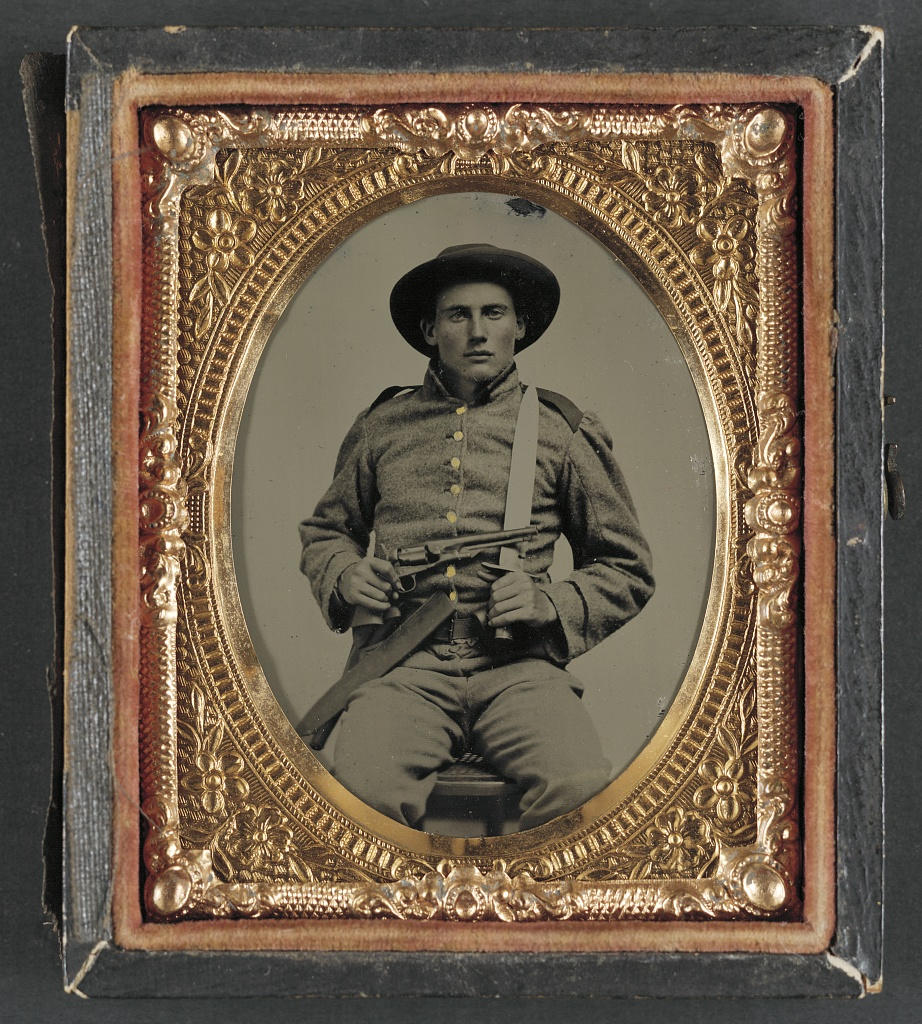
Private William Anthony Holland of Co. K, with Bowie knife and Colt Army Model 1860 revolver

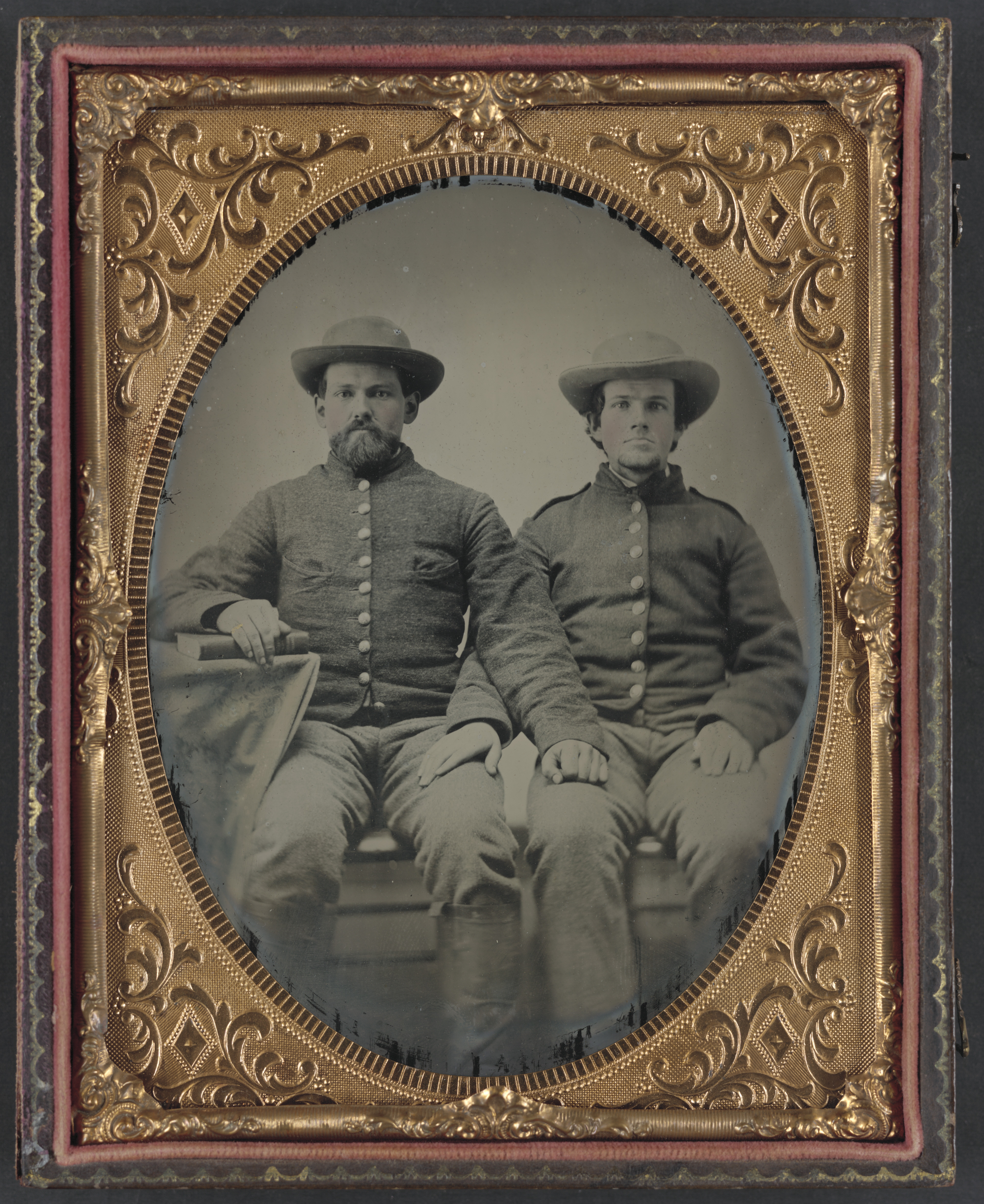
Charles Chapman of Company A, left, and unidentified soldier

== See also ==
- List of Virginia Civil War units
- List of West Virginia Civil War Confederate units
