= Newman Congregational Church =

Historic church in Rhode Island, United States

- U.S. National Register of Historic Places
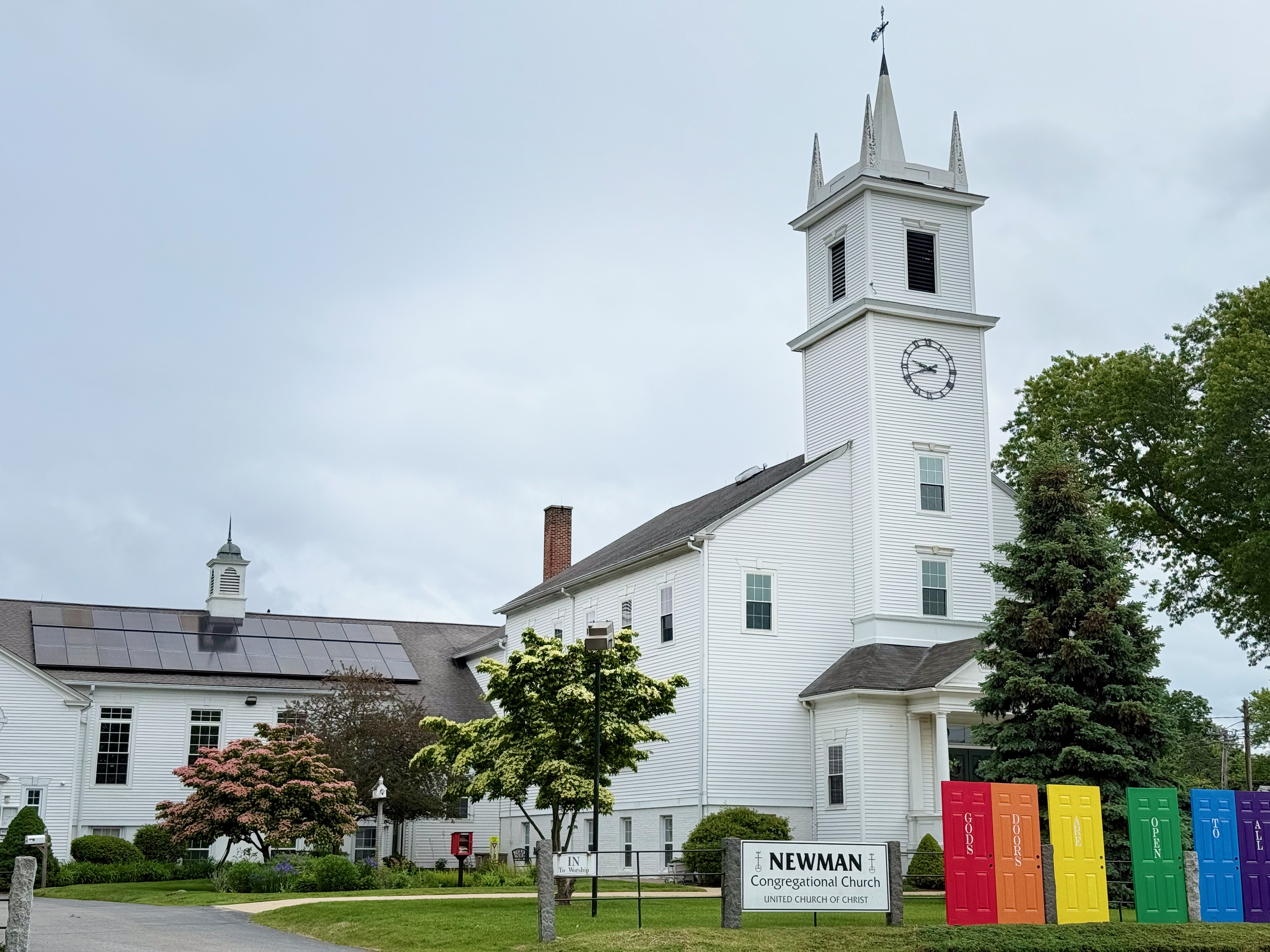

- Location within Rhode Island
- Location: 100 Newman Avenue, East Providence, Rhode Island
- Coordinates: 41°50′28″N 71°21′03″W
- Built: 1810
- NRHP reference No.: 80000003

Newman Congregational Church is a United Church of Christ congregation in East Providence, Rhode Island. The church is a two-story wood-frame structure on a high brick basement. It was built in 1810 for a congregation that was gathered in 1643. Newman Church is the oldest Congregational organization in Rhode Island. Historically located at the center of the Old Rehoboth "Ring of The Green," the church today is located between the historic Newman Cemetery and Carpenter, Lakeside, and Springvale Cemeteries.

Newman Church features in the 2022 Disney film Hocus Pocus 2.

== History ==
The Newman Congregational Church was established by the Rev. Samuel Newman (1602–1663) of Weymouth, Massachusetts. In 1641, he and members of his congregation purchased a tract of land from Pokanoket leader Massasoit Ousamequin located east of Providence, Rhode Island and the Seekonk River. Newman named the new town Rehoboth, and soon afterwards he formed his congregation there.

In 1812, the town of Rehoboth, Massachusetts, was divided in two, and the church location was assigned to the new town of Seekonk. In 1862, the western part of the town of Seekonk became part of the state of Rhode Island and received the name East Providence. Therefore, Newman Church has existed in three towns, two states, and multiple countries, without ever having moved.

== Senior Ministers ==
There have been twenty-two senior ministers of Newman Church since its founding:

- Samuel Newman 1643–1663
- Noah Newman 1668–1678
- Samuel Angier 1679–1693
- Thomas Greenwood 1694–1720
- John Greenwood 1721–1758
- John Carnes 1759–1764
- Ephraim Hyde 1766–1783
- John Ellis 1785–1796
- John Hill 1802–1816
- James O. Barney 1824–1867
- Samuel E. Evans 1868–1871
- Hiram E. Johnson 1872–1879
- Leverett S. Woodward 1880–1887
- Leonard Z. Ferris 1888–1909
- Burton A. Lucas 1909–1916
- Loring B. Chase 1917–1936
- Frank Crook 1936–1959
- Robert H. Simonton 1959–1971
- David F. Shire 1971–1994
- S. C. Campbell Lovett 1996–2012
- Timoth Sylvia 2013–2022
- Samuel Lovett 2025–present

== Gallery ==
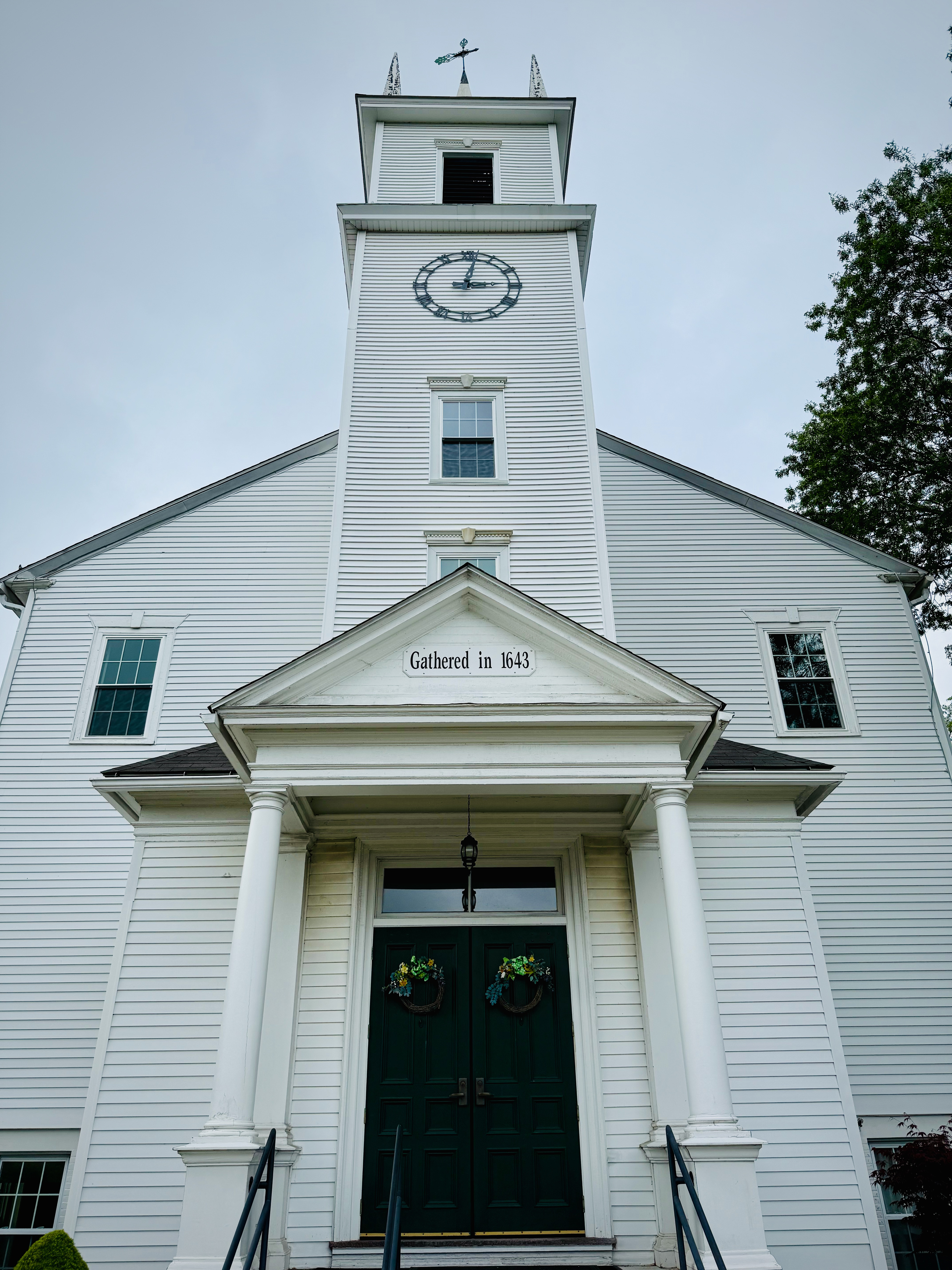
Church facade and bell tower

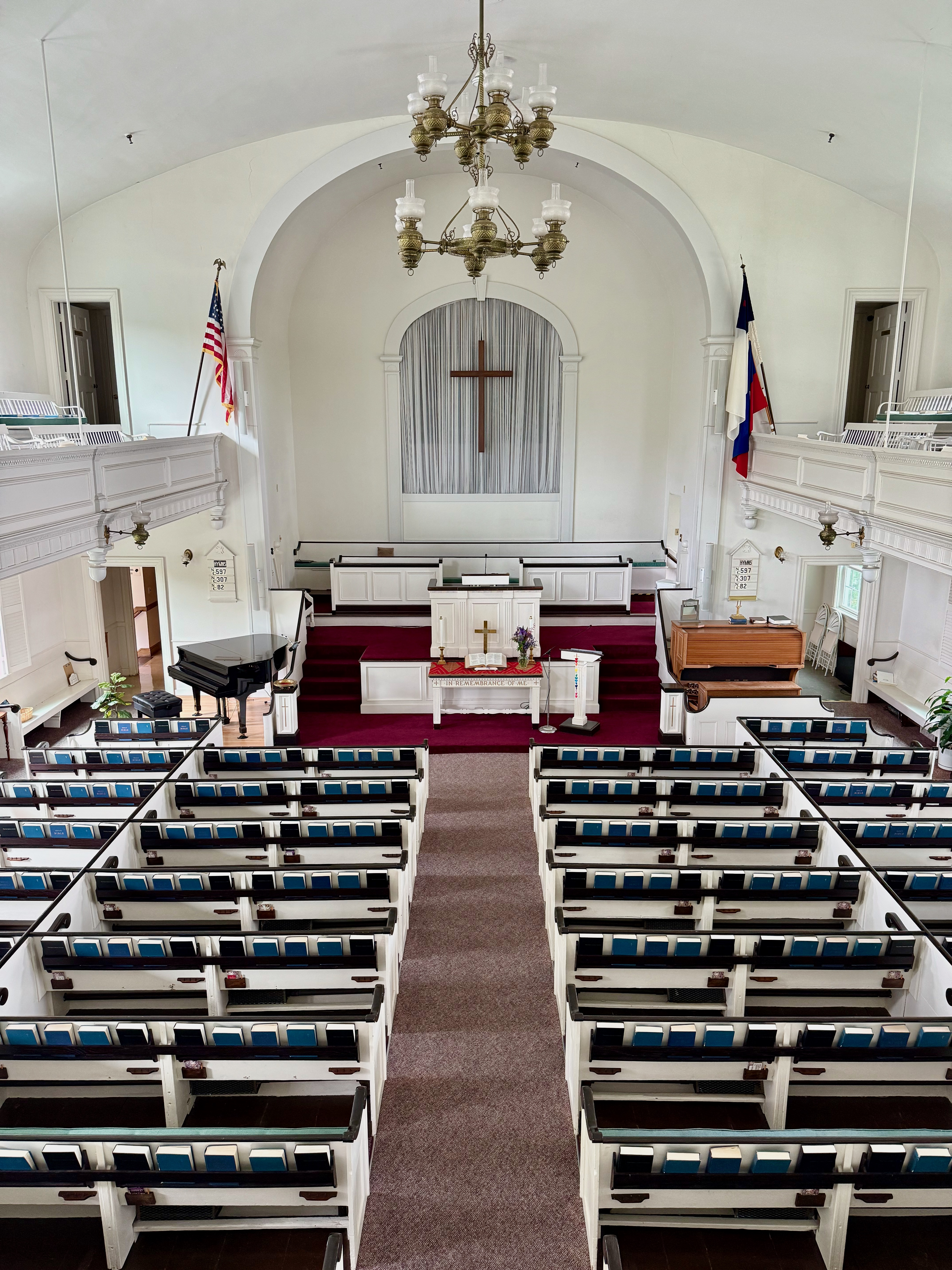
Sanctuary view from balcony

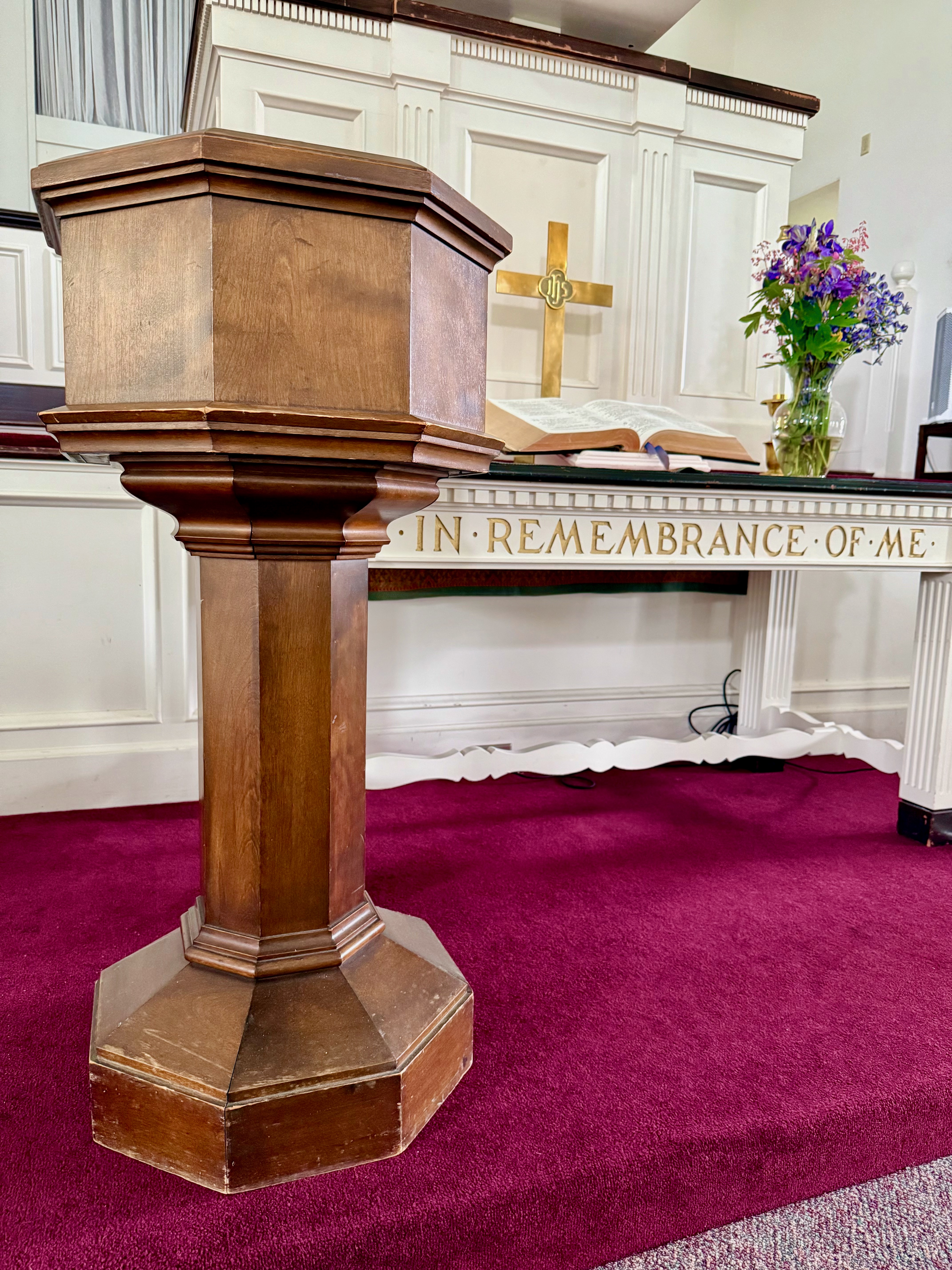
Baptismal font, altar, and pulpit

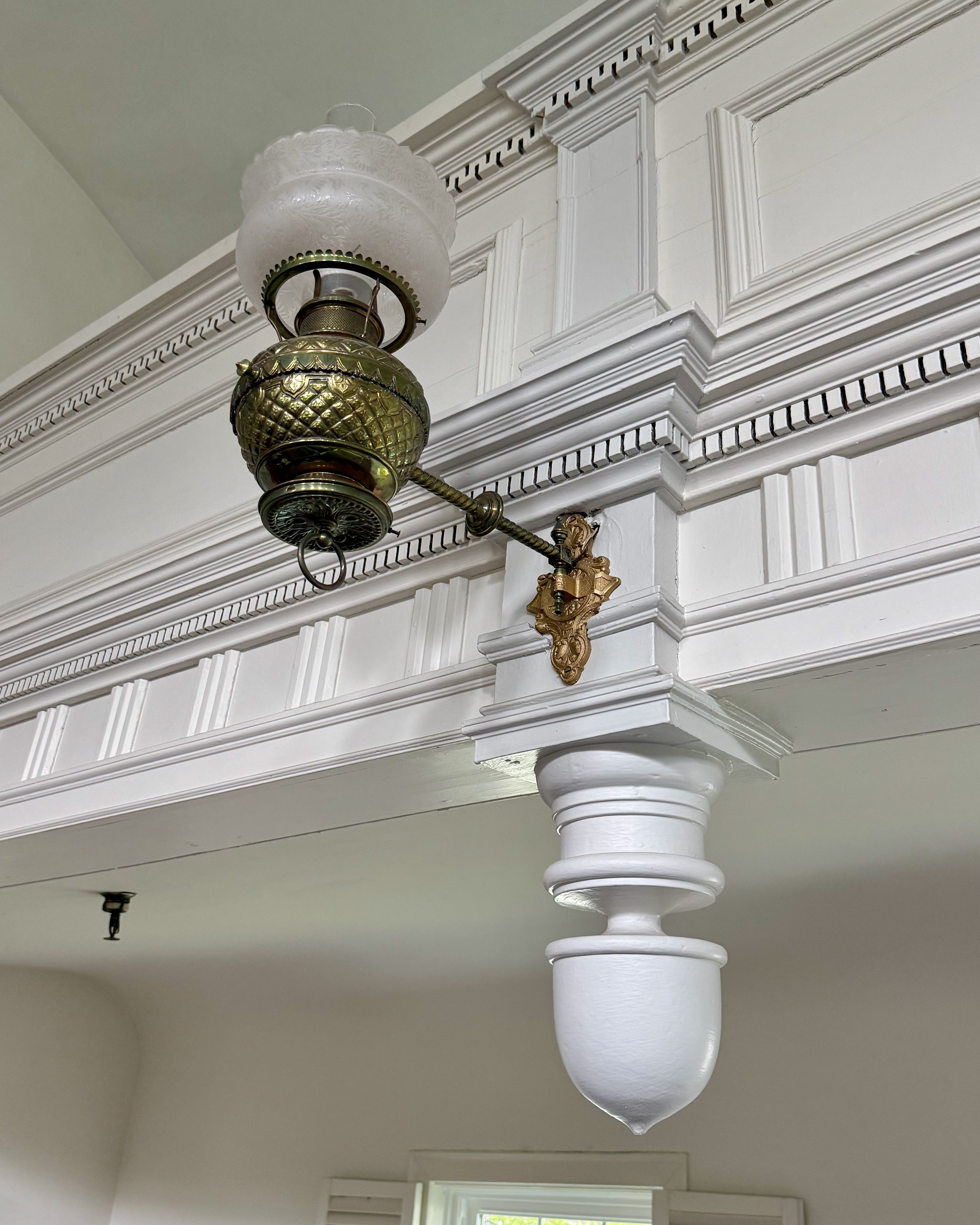
Acorn pendants on balcony panel

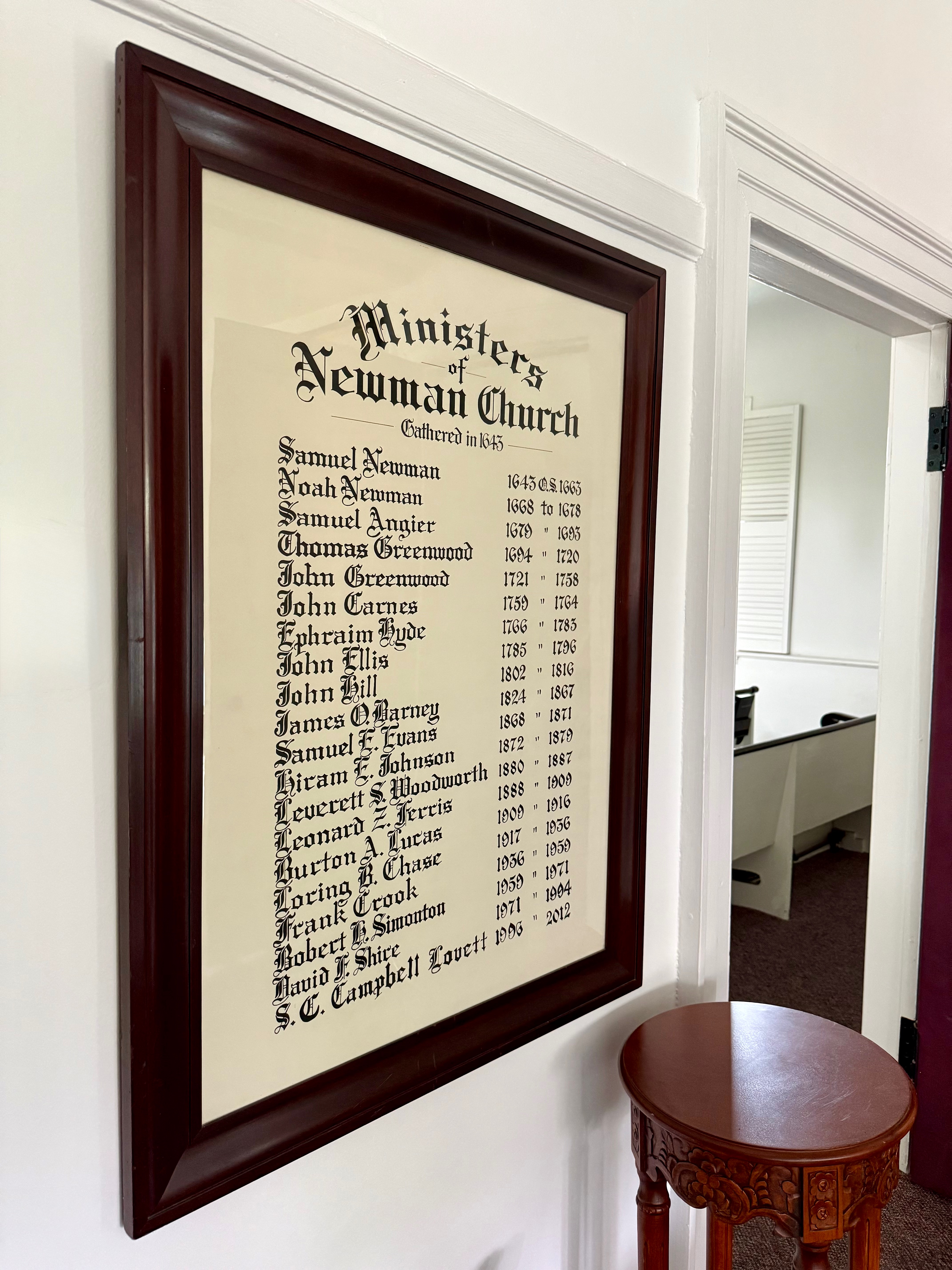
Record of ministers located in church narthex

== See also ==
- Oldest churches in the United States
- National Register of Historic Places listings in Providence County, Rhode Island
