= George N. Bliss =

US Army officer and Medal of Honor recipient

- Born: July 22, 1837; Tiverton, Rhode Island, US
- Died: August 29, 1928 (aged 91); East Providence, Rhode Island, US
- Burial place: Lakeside-Carpenter Cemetery
- Military career
- Allegiance: United States of America
- Branch: United States Army
- Service years: 1861–1865
- Rank: Captain
- Unit: 1st Regiment Rhode Island Volunteer Cavalry
- Conflicts: American Civil War: Battle of Second Bull Run; Battle of Middleburg; First Battle of Deep Bottom
- Awards: Medal of Honor

Captain George Newman Bliss (July 22, 1837 – August 29, 1928) was an American soldier who fought in the American Civil War. Bliss received the country's highest award for bravery during combat, the Medal of Honor, for his actions to counter a Confederate advance in Waynesboro, Virginia on 28 September 1864. He was honored with the award on 3 August 1897.

== Biography ==
Bliss was born in Tiverton, Rhode Island on 22 July 1837 to James Leonard and Sarah A. Bliss née Stafford. Before the war Bliss completed his law degree at Albany Law School in May 1861 and was called to the bar in New York. That same year he enlisted into the Company B of the 1st Rhode Island Cavalry. The following year he was promoted to captain of Company C. He participated in several Civil War battles including the Battle of Second Bull Run, the Battle of Middleburg within the Gettysburg campaign and the First Battle of Deep Bottom as part of the Siege of Petersburg. In September 1864, while in command of a provost guard in the Shenandoah Valley he performed an act of gallantry that resulted in his capture by Confederate soldiers and earned him his Medal of Honor award after his release from Libby Prison on 5 February 1865.

Bliss mustered out of the army in 1865, following the conclusion of the war. He subsequently married Fanny Amelia Carpenter with whom he had five children. He died on 29 August 1928 in East Providence, Rhode Island and is buried at Lakeside-Carpenter Cemetery.

== Medal of Honor citation ==
While in command of the provost guard in the village, he saw the Union lines returning before the attack of a greatly superior force of the enemy, mustered his guard, and, without orders, joined in the defense and charged the enemy without support. He received three saber wounds, his horse was shot, and he was taken prisoner.

== See also ==
- List of American Civil War Medal of Honor recipients: A–F
