= The Picket =

Sculpture in Hanover, Pennsylvania

Coordinates: 39°48′03″N 76°58′59″W

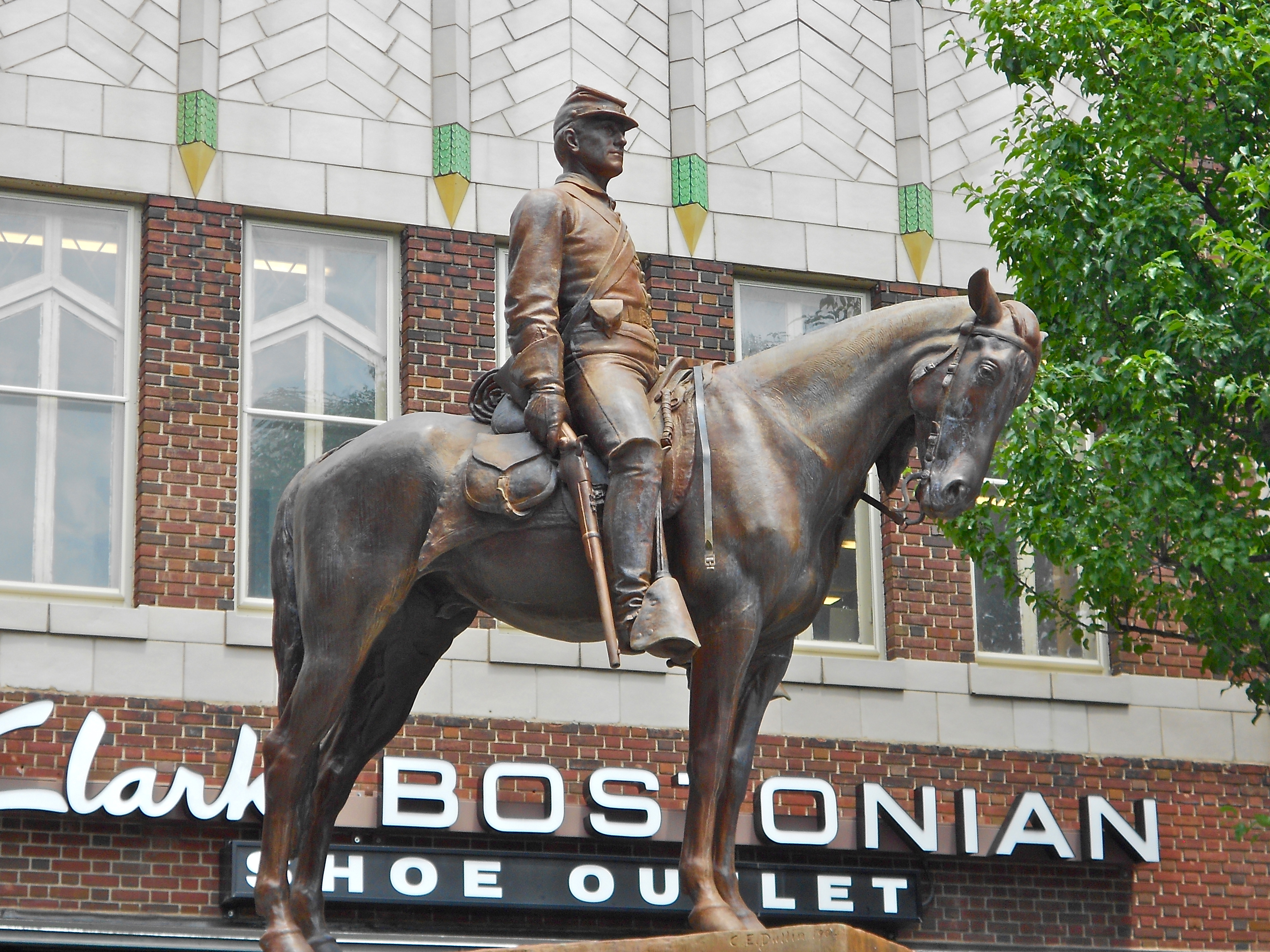
- The sculpture in 2013.
- Artist: Cyrus Edwin Dallin
- Year: 1905
- Type: Bronze
- Location: Hanover, Pennsylvania, United States

The Picket (1905) is an equestrian sculpture by Cyrus E. Dallin in Hanover, Pennsylvania. The work is also referred to by the titles Cavalryman and The Sentry. The sculpture is made of cast bronze and sits on a granite pedestal measuring twelve feet by eight feet. The total height of both the sculpture and the pedestal is twenty feet or about six meters.

The sculpture was erected on September 28, 1905, having been paid for by the state of Pennsylvania. It stood in a roundabout in the middle of Hanover’s Center Square until it was moved in 1968; since then, it has stood north of the square outside 30 Center Square, Hanover.

The sculpture commemorates the Battle of Hanover, which took place on June 30, 1863. The Picket does not represent a particular participant in the Battle of Hanover; instead, it commemorates all of the unnamed cavalrymen whose names have been lost to history.
