= 6th Ohio Cavalry Regiment =

- Active: October 7, 1861–August 7, 1865
- Disbanded: August 7, 1865
- Country: United States
- Allegiance: Union
- Branch: Cavalry
- Size: Regiment; 1,758 men (Total)
- Part of: 2nd Division, Cavalry Corps, Army of the Potomac
- Engagements: American Civil War: West Virginia Campaign; Valley Campaign; Northern Virginia Campaign; Battle of Fredericksburg; Battle of Kelly's Ford; Battle of Brandy Station; Gettysburg campaign; Mine Run Campaign; Bristoe Campaign; Overland Campaign; Siege of Petersburg; Battle of Trevilian Station; Battle of Five Forks; Battle of Sailor's Creek; Appomattox Campaign

Commanders
- Notable commanders: Col. William Stedman

The 6th Ohio Cavalry Regiment was a cavalry regiment of the Union Army, which was raised in ten counties in northeastern and north-central Ohio for service during the American Civil War. It served primarily in the Eastern Theater in several major campaigns of the Army of the Potomac and was particularly active during the Gettysburg campaign of 1863.

== Organization and early service ==
The 6th Ohio Cavalry Regiment was commissioned for a three-year term. It was organized at Camp Hutchins in Warren, Ohio, on October 7, 1861, and first served under Colonel William R. Lloyd.

The regiment was on duty in Warren until January 1862, and was then garrisoned at Camp Chase and Camp Dennison until May 1862. The troopers were given their horses while stationed at Camp Dennison, after which the officers led the men in mounted cavalry drills. Following completion of training, the regiment moved to Wheeling, West Virginia on May 13 and then to Strasburg, Virginia to join Major General John C. Fremont's army in the Shenandoah Valley. The regiment was attached to the Mountain Department until June 1862 and participated in several engagements with the Confederates, first seeing combat at the Battle of Woodstock on June 2. Other battles during this period included Cross Keys and Cedar Mountain.

In late June, the regiment moved to the Virginia Peninsula and became part of the 2nd Brigade, 2nd Division, 1st Corps, Pope's Army of Virginia until July 1862. The regiment saw considerable action during the Northern Virginia Campaign in the late summer, and was engaged in skirmishing during the Second Bull Run operations. As part of the Army of the Potomac, the 6th Ohio Cavalry participated in the Fredericksburg operations in November–December 1862. It subsequently went into winter quarters, guarding the Rappahannock River.

== 1863 and 1864 ==
In 1863, the regiment participated in the Battle of Kelly's Ford. Later that year, it was heavily involved in the Gettysburg campaign, fighting at the Battle of Brandy Station and in several smaller engagements during the Union operations in the Loudoun Valley of Virginia, including the battles of Aldie, Middleburg, and Upperville. They traveled into Pennsylvania with the division as part of the brigade of Col. Pennock Huey, but before the Battle of Gettysburg withdrew to Westminster, Maryland, to guard the army's supply trains. The regiment was active during the retreat of the Confederate Army of Northern Virginia in July. Later in the year, the regiment participated in both the Mine Run and Bristoe campaigns.

After spending the winter fighting Mosby's guerillas, in the spring of 1864 the regiment joined Ulysses S. Grant's movement on Richmond, participating in several battles while serving in the Cavalry Corps, under Gen. Philip H. Sheridan. It was involved in the Union cavalry operations during the Overland Campaign and the Siege of Petersburg, as well as taking part in the Battle of Trevilian Station.

== 1865 and the end of the war ==
In 1865, the regiment was in the Battle of Five Forks, and during the Appomattox Campaign, in the Battle of Sayler's Creek.

The 6th Ohio Cavalry marched in the Grand Review of the Armies in May 1865, and then exited service at Petersburg, Virginia, on August 7, 1865.

During its term of service, the 6th Ohio Cavalry lost 5 officers and 52 enlisted men killed and mortally wounded, and 4 officers and 177 enlisted men by disease, for a total of 238 fatalities. More than 1700 men served in the ranks at various times, however, the field strength of the regiment rarely exceeded 500 men at any given time.

A stone monument to the regiment stands along Taneytown Road on the Gettysburg Battlefield, which features a relief of a saber-wielding cavalryman mounted on his horse at full gallop.
