= Camp Hutchins =

Union Army camp in Ohio

Camp Hutchins was a Union Army training camp located in Warren, Ohio, which trained local volunteers from October to December 1861.

== Civil War and Camp Hutchins development ==
In the spring of 1861, the U.S. War Department commissioned Ohio Senator Benjamin Wade of Jefferson and local Congressman John Hutchins, both of which would supervise the Union Army's recruitment services in Northeast Ohio. As part of the process, recruitment rolls had to be filled during the summer, in order for training to be conducted in the fall. During the location selection process, the Oak Grove Fairgrounds in Warren, Ohio was chosen as one of the sites where the prospective soldiers trained. In Hutchins' honor, the training site was named Camp Hutchins.

With the American Civil War's outbreak, both the North and South weren't prepared for conflict. Following the Confederate States of America's attack on Fort Sumter in April 1861, President Abraham Lincoln called for 75,000 trained volunteers to assist in Union military efforts. Ohio Governor William Dennison Jr. wanted to utilize his state's militia forces to aid Lincoln. Unfortunately for Dennison, many of Ohio's militia forces were no longer in existence by spring 1861.

Dennison initially encouraged communities across the state to send their militia companies to Columbus, Ohio for possible use by the North during the Civil War. Eventually, Camp Hutchins was established in Warren, where training began in October 1861.

== 6th Ohio Volunteer Cavalry ==
With their official designation as the 6th Ohio Volunteer Cavalry, the training for these soldiers commenced on October 7, 1861 at Camp Hutchins in Warren. More than 800 soldiers comprised the cavalry. Authorized by the War Department to serve in the Civil War, the cavalry became the second regiment in Wade & Hutchins' Cavalry Brigade.

Camp Hutchins only remained in use until the end of 1861. During training, the regiment received support from their Warren community in the form of a Thanksgiving feast, a Christmas Eve ball in Warren's Gaskill House, and a New Year's picnic. The 6th Ohio Volunteer Cavalry would eventually depart at the beginning of 1862.

In January 1862, the regiment relocated to Camp Dennison for drill instruction. In March, the regiment was assigned to guard Confederate prisoners at Camp Chase. During the Civil War, the regiment shifted command several times, eventually engaging in conflict with General Robert E. Lee and his Confederate forces at the Battle of Gettysburg in July 1863. Following Lee's surrender to General Ulysses S. Grant at Appomattox Courthouse, the regiment escorted Grant from Appomattox to Burkesville Station. In August 1865, the 6th Ohio was mustered out of service in Cleveland. In total, casualties for the 6th Ohio reached 238.

== Current dedication ==
The former site of Camp Hutchins stands as an official landmark in Warren's history. Camp Hutchins shared the same location as the Trumbull County Fairgrounds and the present-day Warren G. Harding High School campus. In 2012, the landmark was dedicated while students from Harding performed music that dated back a century and a half ago. In a 2012 WFMJ (Youngstown) article, Wendell Lauth, a member of the Civil War 150 Committee, dedicated to honoring the, at the time, 150th anniversary of the Civil War, said; It's a perfect teaching lesson in local history for high school classes."
