= Battle of Aldie =

1863 battle of the American Civil War

- Part of the American Civil War
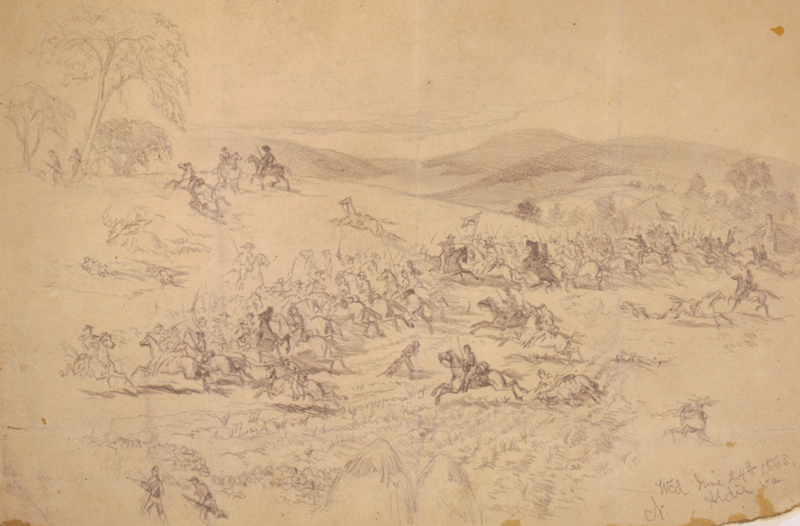
- Cavalry fight near Aldie, Va., by Edwin Forbes
Date	June 17, 1863
Location	Loudoun County, Virginia 38.9826°N 77.6588°W
Result	Inconclusive

Belligerents
United States (Union)	CSA (Confederacy)

Commanders and leaders
Judson Kilpatrick	Thomas T. Munford

Units involved
1st Maine Cavalry; 1st Massachusetts Cavalry; 2nd New York Cavalry; 4th New York Cavalry; 6th Ohio Cavalry; 1st Rhode Island Cavalry	1st Virginia Cavalry; 2nd Virginia Cavalry; 3rd Virginia Cavalry; 4th Virginia Cavalry; 5th Virginia Cavalry

Strength
2,000	1,500

Casualties and losses
305	110–119
- Location of the battle in Virginia

The Battle of Aldie took place on June 17, 1863, in Loudoun County, Virginia, as part of the Gettysburg campaign of the American Civil War.

Maj. Gen. J.E.B. Stuart's cavalry screened Gen. Robert E. Lee's Confederate infantry as it marched north in the Shenandoah Valley behind the sheltering Blue Ridge Mountains. The pursuing Union cavalry of Brig. Gen. Judson Kilpatrick's brigade, in the advance of Brig. Gen. David McMurtrie Gregg's division, encountered Col. Thomas T. Munford's troopers near the village of Aldie, resulting in four hours of stubborn fighting. Both sides made mounted assaults by regiments and squadrons. Kilpatrick was reinforced in the afternoon, and Munford finally withdrew toward Middleburg.

== Background ==
Late in the spring of 1863 tensions grew between Union commander Joseph Hooker and his cavalry commander Brig. Gen. Alfred Pleasonton because of the latter's inability to penetrate Maj. Gen. J.E.B. Stuart's cavalry screen and gain access to the Shenandoah Valley to locate the Army of Northern Virginia, which had been on the move since June 3rd. On June 17, Pleasonton decided to push through Stuart's screen. To accomplish his goal he ordered Brig. Gen. David McM. Gregg's division from Manassas Junction westward down the Little River Turnpike to Aldie. Aldie was tactically important in that near the village the Little River Turnpike intersected both the Ashby's Gap Turnpike and Snicker's Gap Turnpike, which respectively led through Ashby's Gap and Snickers Gap of the Blue Ridge Mountain into the valley.

== Battle ==
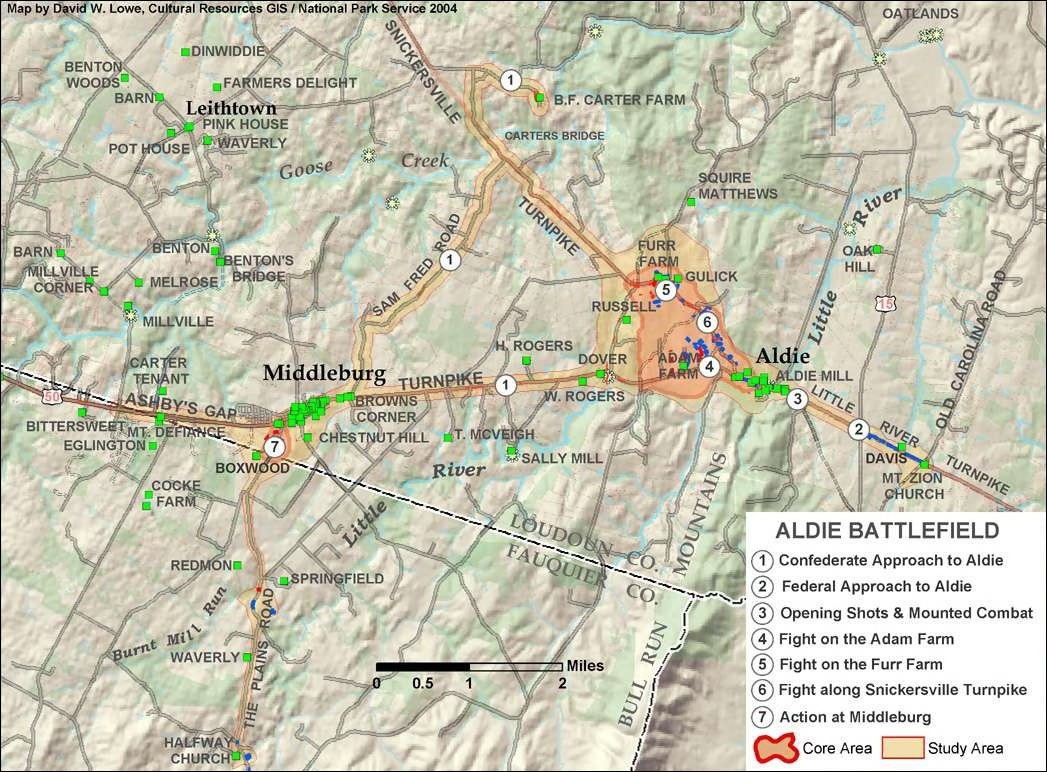
Map of battlefield core and study areas.

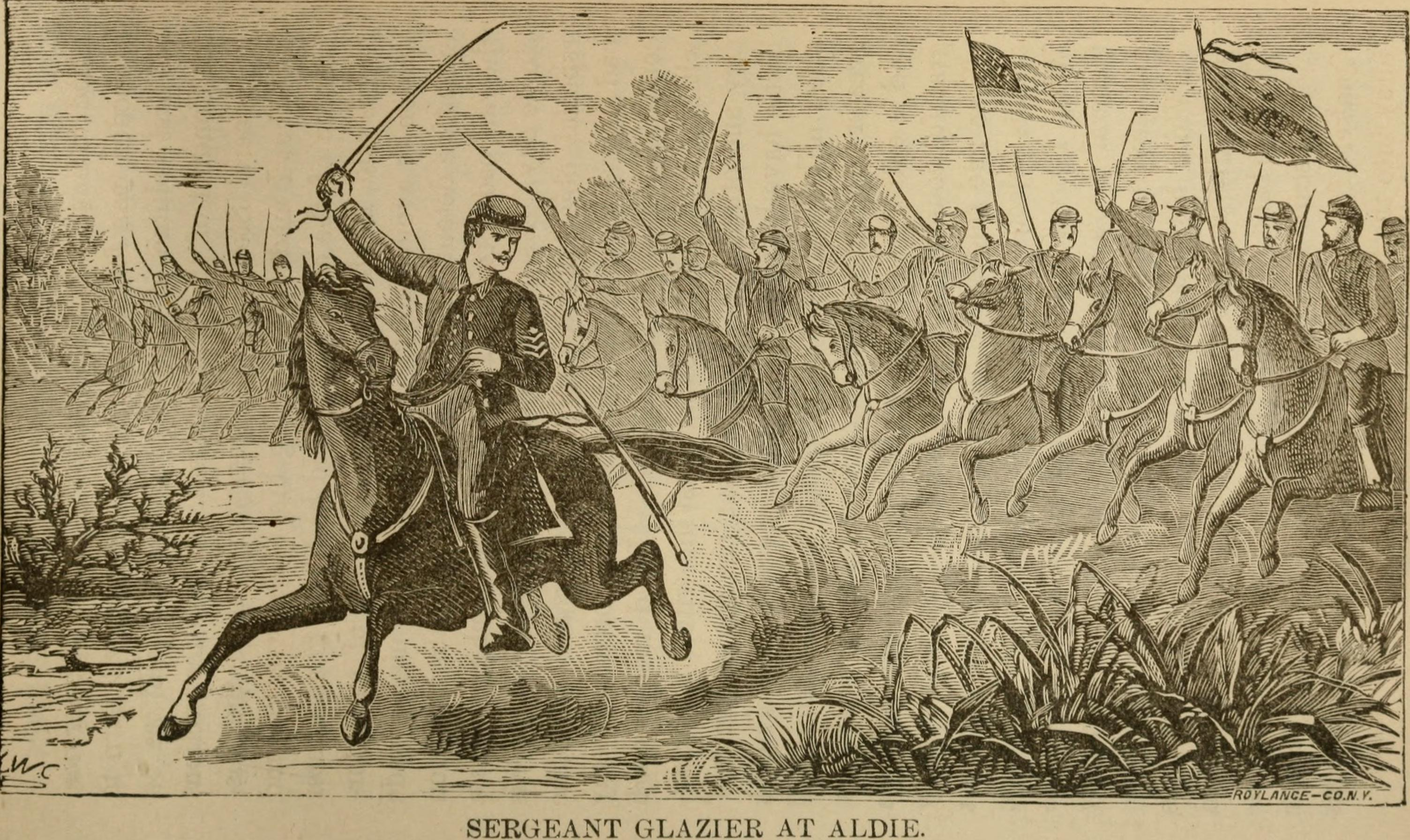
"Sergeant Glazier at the Aldie" as depicted in Sword and pen – or, Ventures and adventures of Willard Glazier in war and literature (1890) by John Algernon Owens

Early that very same morning, Colonel Munford led the 2nd and 3rd Virginia Cavalry eastward across the Loudoun Valley from Upperville through Middleburg to Aldie on the Bull Run Mountains on a reconnaissance and forage mission. He established a line of pickets in Aldie to watch for enemy activity and withdrew his two regiments northwest of town on the Snicker's Gap Turnpike to camp on the farm of Franklin Carter.

About 2 pm, Gregg's advance column of the 2nd and 4th New York, 6th Ohio, 1st Maine, 1st Rhode Island, and 1st Massachusetts, under the command of Brig. Gen. Judson Kilpatrick arrived in Aldie. Just west of the village the 1st Massachusetts encountered Munford's pickets and drove them back. Around the same time, the rest of Munford's brigade (the 1st, 4th, and 5th Virginia Cavalry, under the command of Col. Williams Carter Wickham) arrived at Dover Mills, a small hamlet on the Little River west of Aldie. Wickham ordered Col. Thomas L. Rosser to take the 5th Virginia to locate a campsite closer to Aldie. As they moved east they ran into the Massachusetts men and easily drove them back through Aldie to the main Union body. After positioning his sharpshooters (50 men of Company I under Capt. Reuben F. Boston) east of the William Adam farmhouse, Rosser deployed west along a ridge that covered the two roads leading out of Aldie and awaited the arrival of the Federals, as well as Munford and Wickham. As Rosser withdrew west, the 1st Massachusetts, with aid from the 4th New York, charged against what they believed to be a retreat. Rosser's line held and he mounted a countercharge in concert with a sharp volley from the sharpshooters he had placed on his left and easily drove the Federals back, securing his hold on the Ashby's Gap Turnpike.

Kilpatrick then turned his attention towards the Snicker's Gap Turnpike. An artillery duel ensued and more cavalry on both sides soon arrived. A furious fight erupted, which at first went in favor of Munford as Federal charges were met, stopped, and then forced back by the withering volley of sharpshooters entrenched along a stone wall. The 1st Massachusetts Cavalry was trapped in a blind curve on the Snicker's Gap Turnpike and was destroyed, losing 198 of 294 men in the eight companies that were engaged. One detachment under Henry Lee Higginson was virtually wiped out in hand-to-hand fighting. The tide finally turned as Union reinforcements charged into the fray in the fading light and the 6th Ohio overran Boston's detachment on the Ashby's Gap Turnpike, capturing or killing most of his men. The fighting died down around 8 pm as Munford withdrew his command west towards Middleburg.

== Aftermath ==
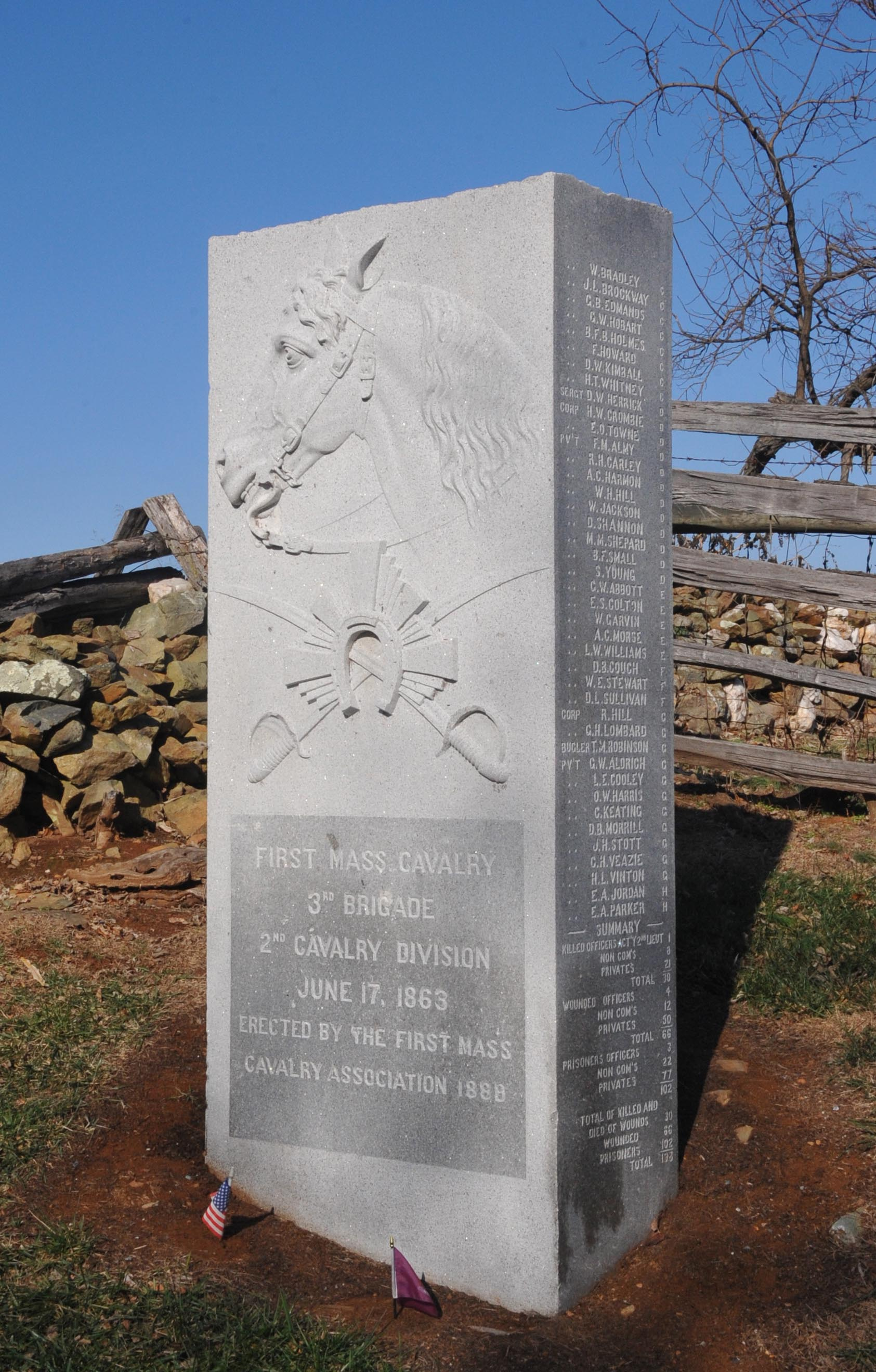
Monument to the 1st Massachusetts

Munford did not consider Aldie a defeat because his withdrawal coincided with an order from Stuart to retire, as more Federal cavalry had been sighted at Middleburg. Union casualties were 305 dead and wounded, with the Confederates losing between 110 and 119. Aldie was the first in a series of small battles along the Ashby's Gap Turnpike in which Stuart's forces successfully delayed Pleasonton's thrust across the Loudoun Valley, depriving him of the opportunity to locate Lee's army.

Luigi Palma Di Cesnola, Colonel of the 4th New York Cavalry was captured during the battle and sent to Libby Prison until May 1864. He would be awarded the Medal of Honor for his actions at the Battle of Aldie.

== Battlefield ==
Although not fully protected, the battlefield remains largely intact. Aldie and its mill look much as they did at the time of the battle. Widening of U.S. Route 50 has compromised the portion of the battlefield along the Ashby's Gap Turnpike. The stone wall and farmsteads remain intact along the Snicker's Gap Turnpike (present day Route 734). At the site of the stone wall along the blind curve where the 1st Massachusetts was decimated, a monument erected by the survivors stands to honor the service during the battle. On May 8, 2012, Gov. Bob McDonnell announced the preservation of a five-acre site to be purchased by the Civil War Trust and later to be operated as a passive historic interpretative site by the park authority. The land is along the Loudoun/Fauquier county border and was key to the June 17–21, 1863, battles of Aldie, Middleburg, and Upperville. The Civil War Trust (a division of the American Battlefield Trust and its partners have acquired and preserved 605 acres (2.45 km^{2}) of the battlefield in four different acquisitions since 2001.
