= John R. Chambliss =

Confederate officer in the American Civil War

John Randolph Chambliss Jr.
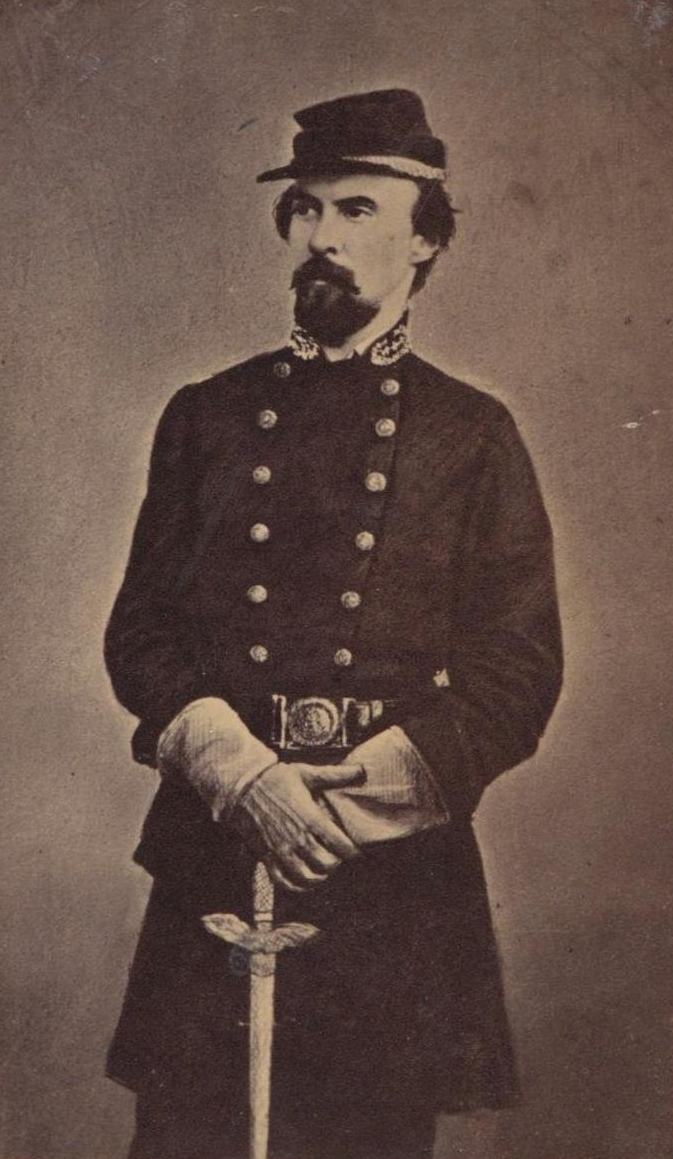
- Born: January 23, 1833; Greensville County, Virginia, US
- Died: August 16, 1864 (aged 31); Henrico County, Virginia, US
- Military career
- Allegiance: United States; Confederate States of America
- Branch: United States Army; Confederate States Army
- Service years: 1853–1854 (USA); 1861–1864 (CSA)
- Rank: Brevet Second Lieutenant (USA); Brigadier General (CSA)
- Commands: 13th Virginia Cavalry; Chambliss's Brigade, W.H.F. Lee's Division, Cavalry Corps, Army of Northern Virginia
- Conflicts: American Civil War: Battle of Brandy Station; Battle of Aldie; Battle of Middleburg; Battle of Hanover; Battle of Gettysburg; Bristoe Campaign; Overland Campaign; Second Battle of Deep Bottom †

John Randolph Chambliss Jr. (January 23, 1833 – August 16, 1864) was a career military officer from Virginia who served in the Confederate States Army. He reached the rank of brigadier general of cavalry before being killed in action in August 1864 during the Second Battle of Deep Bottom. Born to a lawyer, Colonel and Mrs John Chambliss of Hicksford, Va, John, jr. graduated from West Point (1853) with several future generals, particularly his friend David M. Gregg, a future Union General as their paths would have an ominous crossing in August 1864.

== Early life ==
Chambliss was born at Hicksford in Greensville County, Virginia. His father, John R. Chambliss Sr., was a lawyer, plantation owner, and politician who later served in the Confederate States Congress.

The younger Chambliss was appointed to the United States Military Academy at West Point. He graduated 31st of 52 in the Class of 1853. It was distinguished by having 15 future Civil War generals in it, including fellow Southerners John S. Bowen, Henry B. Davidson, and Hood, who all joined the CSA.

== Antebellum military career ==
Chambliss was commissioned as a brevet second lieutenant in the mounted infantry and taught at the cavalry school at Carlisle, Pennsylvania. In the spring of 1855, he resigned.

Believing that military opportunities were limited, he returned home to Hicksford (Emporia), where his father was a wealthy planter. Chambliss also engaged in agriculture until the spring of 1861.

But, based on the advantage of his military education, he was appointed as aide-de-camp to Governor Henry A. Wise, with the initial rank of major, serving from 1856–61. Chambliss was appointed as colonel of a regiment of Virginia militia, serving from 1858–61. He was the brigade inspector general for the Commonwealth for two years.

His father was chosen as a delegate to the secession convention in 1861, and the younger Chambliss also maintained a strong allegiance to Virginia.

== Civil War ==
With the outbreak of war, Chambliss was commissioned colonel of the 13th Virginia Cavalry in July 1861. Until the fall of 1862 he was under the orders of Maj. Gen. D. H. Hill, in the department south of the James River. During the Maryland Campaign, he was put in command of the forces on the Rappahannock River, between Warrenton and Fredericksburg, with the 13th Virginia, 2nd North Carolina Cavalry, and 61st Virginia Infantry. He received a commendation for his performance from General Robert E. Lee. In November he was assigned with his regiment to Fitzhugh Lee's cavalry brigade.

In April 1863, when the cavalry corps of the Union Army of the Potomac attempted to cross the Rappahannock and cut General Lee's communications with Richmond, Chambliss was particularly prominent in turning back this movement. At Beverly Ford with 50 men, he drove two Federal squadrons into the river, capturing a number of prisoners. He and his men were commended for bravery by generals Robert. E. Lee and J.E.B. Stuart.

== Gettysburg Campaign, 1864 ==
In the Battle of Brandy Station, after Fitzhugh Lee was wounded and Col. Solomon Williams killed, Chambliss took command of the brigade. He served in that capacity during the fighting in Aldie and Middleburg.

Riding with Stuart into Pennsylvania, Chambliss attacked the 18th Pennsylvania Cavalry of Judson Kilpatrick's division at Hanover, driving the Union force through the town, capturing its ambulances and a number of prisoners. His brigade and Fitzhugh Lee's reached Gettysburg late on July 2. On July 3, he engaged in the fierce fighting at East Cavalry Field. Upon the withdrawal of the army to safety in Virginia, his brigade covered the movement of the Confederate trains.

During the subsequent Bristoe Campaign, still in command of the brigade, Chambliss reinforced Lunsford L. Lomax at Morton's Ford and defeated the enemy. Engaged again near Brandy Station, the same two brigades fought with gallantry and Chambliss again received Stuart's written commendation.

== Death ==
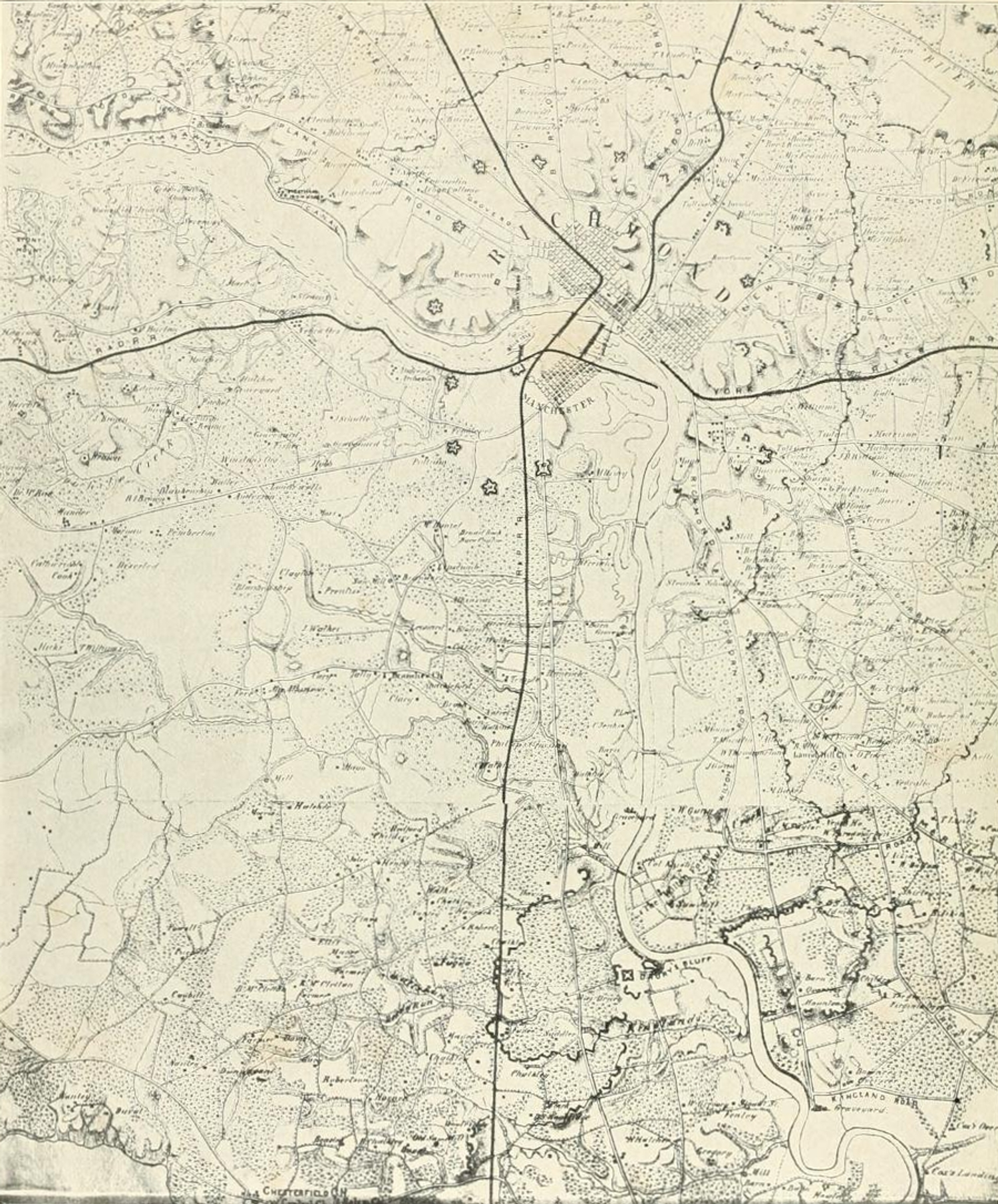
This map of Confederate defenses surrounding Richmond was recovered by Union forces from the body of Chambliss

Promoted to brigadier general, Chambliss continued in command of the brigade, through the cavalry fighting from the Rapidan River to the James. He defeated the Federals at Stony Creek, Virginia.

Finally, in a cavalry battle on the Charles City Road, on the north side of the James River, Chambliss was killed while leading his men. His body was buried with honor by the Federals. Soon afterward, on 17 August 1864, a detachment of Confederate soldiers came across the union lines under a flag of truce to retrieve Chambliss's body. His body was delivered to friends and returned for burial in the Chambliss Family Cemetery in Emporia, Virginia.

Robert E. Lee wrote that "the loss sustained by the cavalry in the fall of General Chambliss will be felt throughout the army, in which, by his courage, energy and skill, he had won for himself an honorable name."

== See also ==
- List of American Civil War generals (Confederate)
