= Alfred N. Duffié =

Union Army general

"Alfred" Napoléon Duffié
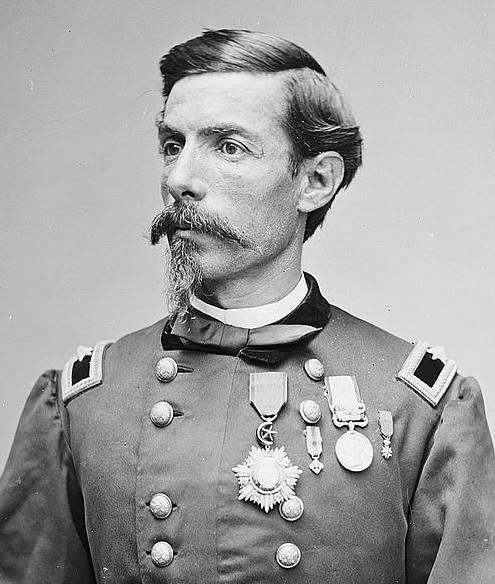
- Brig. Gen. Alfred N. Duffié
- Born: May 1, 1833; Paris, Kingdom of France
- Died: November 8, 1880 (aged 47); Cádiz, Kingdom of Spain
- Military career
- Allegiance: French Second Republic; United States of America; Union
- Branch: French Army; United States Army; Union Army
- Service years: 1852–1859 (French Army); 1861–1865 (US Army)
- Rank: Sub-Lieutenant (France); Brigadier General (USA)
- Nickname: Nattie
- Commands: 1st Rhode Island Cavalry Regiment
- Conflicts: Crimean War; Combat of Kanghil; American Civil War; Battle of Kelly's Ford; Battle of Brandy Station

"Alfred" Napoléon Duffié (May 1, 1833 – November 8, 1880) was a French-American soldier and diplomat who served in the Crimean War and the American Civil War.

== Early life and career ==
Duffié was born in Paris. Several claims about his early life seem to be untrue: that he graduated from the École Spéciale Militaire de Saint-Cyr, that he fought in the Austro-Italian War of 1859, that he was awarded the Legion d'Honneur though he wore it in several photographs, or that his father was a count. It is known that Duffié joined France's Imperial Cavalry in 1852, being assigned to the 6th Dragoon Regiment. As a member of this unit, he served during the Crimean War, seeing action at the Battle of Balaclava and the Battle of Chernaya River. He proved to be a skilled non-commissioned officer and rose through the ranks. In 1859, Duffié earned a commission as a sub-lieutenant with the 3rd Hussar cavalry regiment. However, for unclear reasons, he soon resigned his commission and left France for the United States. For leaving the army before his resignation was accepted, Duffié was charged with desertion and sentenced in absentia to ten years of imprisonment. After coming to the United States he married into a prominent New York family, making his new home on Staten Island.

== Civil War ==
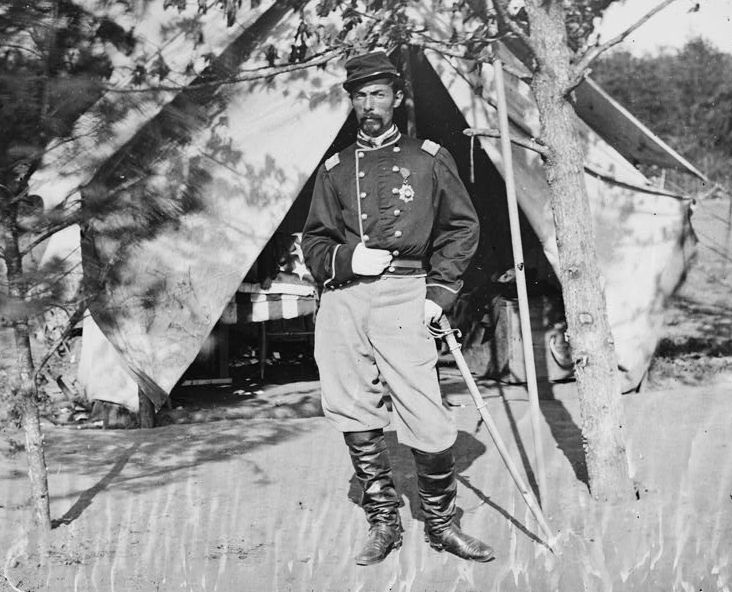
Col. Alfred N. Duffie, 1st Rhode Island Cavalry, Bull Run, Virginia, July 1862

When the American Civil War broke out, Duffié enlisted in the Union Army. He first joined the 2nd New York Cavalry Regiment (also known as the Harris Light Cavalry), on August 9, 1861, and was soon promoted to the rank of captain. The somewhat quarrelsome Duffié was placed under arrest several times for confrontations with other officers; in one incident, he challenged General Fitz John Porter to a duel. In July 1862 Duffié was appointed to command the 1st Rhode Island Cavalry Regiment, with the rank of colonel, by that state's governor, William Sprague IV. Though the 1st Rhode Island's officers initially refused to serve under a foreign-born leader, Duffié soon won them over and reorganized the regiment into a fine fighting unit. Assigned to the command of General William Averell, they saw action against Confederate troops under Thomas J. "Stonewall" Jackson in August 1862, in fighting near Cedar Mountain, Virginia.

At the Battle of Kelly's Ford in March 1863 Duffié ordered a charge, against Averell's orders to keep on the defensive, which forced the opposing cavalry into retreat. When the Union cavalry was reorganized under Alfred Pleasonton, Duffié was assigned to command the 2nd Cavalry Division. On June 9, 1863, Duffié's division was part of the left wing of an intended an assault on the Confederate cavalry but initially lost its way, putting them behind schedule. Meanwhile, the Union right wing had opened the Battle of Brandy Station. Arriving on the field, Duffié was ordered toward the town of Stevensburg; there his division was halted by a smaller Confederate force. As a result, he was demoted back to regimental command. On June 17, 1863, he led the 1st Rhode Island on a reconnaissance mission toward Middleburg, Virginia. There he came close to capturing Confederate cavalry commander J.E.B. Stuart; after his narrow escape, Stuart returned to Middleburg and inflicted a decisive defeat on Duffié's regiment; only 61 members of the 1st Rhode Island got back to the Union lines.

Relinquishing his command, Duffié returned to Washington, D.C. Though he received a promotion to the rank of brigadier general on June 23, 1863, he would not see active duty again until that fall when he was assigned to raise and train cavalry units in West Virginia. His division of West Virginia volunteers saw action around Lewisburg in December 1863 and as part of General David Hunter's 1864 campaign in the Shenandoah Valley. He also took part in operations against Confederate guerrilla leader John S. Mosby, promising to capture the so-called "Gray Ghost" and bring him back to Washington. Instead, it was Duffié who was captured by Mosby's men near Bunker Hill, West Virginia, on October 20, 1864. Due to this incident General Phillip Sheridan requested that he be dismissed from the army calling him "a trifling man and a poor soldier. He was captured by his own stupidity." He was sent to prison camp, then paroled on February 22, 1865. Duffié was then ordered to Texas for a campaign against Confederate General Edmund Kirby Smith, but that campaign ended before he could arrive.

== Postwar career ==
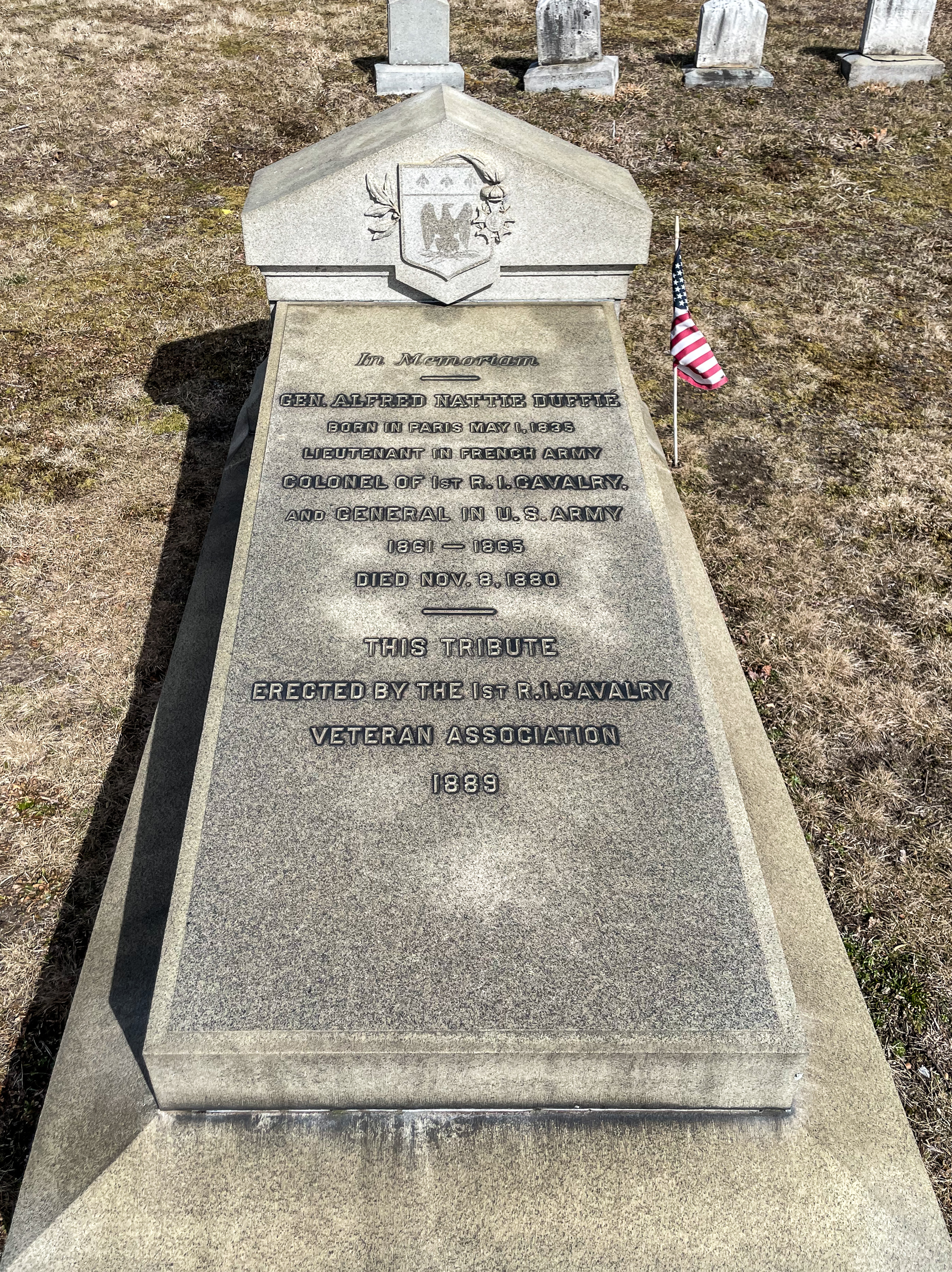
Duffié's cenotaph at North Burial Ground, Providence Rhode Island

On August 24, 1865 Duffié was mustered out of service and returned to his Staten Island home. He was naturalized as a U.S. citizen in 1867. In 1869 he was appointed U.S. consul to Cadiz, Spain. It was there, on November 8, 1880, that he died from tuberculosis.

Duffie was buried at Fountain Cemetery, in West New Brighton, Staten Island. After his death, some of Duffié' officers from the 1st Rhode Island Cavalry established a subscription toward a cenotaph to their former leader, which was erected in Providence's North Burial Ground in 1889.

Contemporary researchers also gave him the name "Alexander", which is not his real name either. The only document attesting to this first name is his official letter written in Chartres on August 8, 1859 addressed to the Minister of War in Paris to ask for his resignation. The use of the first name Alexandre reveals more of a family and personal habit or rather of Duffié's intention to desert the French army in case of refusal of his request in order to mislead the military authorities. Once he arrived in America, he never revealed his true first name "Napoléon" and everyone believed his given initial "N." meant "Nattie". At the time of his official funeral in Providence, July 10, 1889, nine years after his death, Lieutenant Samuel C. Willis Junior announced his real name: "One correction I wished to make in regard to General Duffié's name. His name was Alfred Napoléon Duffié, and not Alfred Nattie Duffié, as we have always supposed". Furthermore, his first name "Alfred" was invented by himself at the time of his desertion from the French army in 1859 in order to hide his real identity, as he was wanted by the army authorities in Paris as soon as his disappearance was noticed.
