= John Logan Black =

American Confederate Army officer (1830–1902)

- Born: July 12, 1830; York, South Carolina, U.S.
- Died: March 25, 1902 (aged 71)
- Burial place: Aimwell Cemetery
- Education: United States Military Academy
- Military career
- Conflicts: American Civil War

John Logan Black (July 12, 1830 - March 25, 1902) was a Confederate States Army officer, a Lieutenant Colonel in the cavalry who served at the Battle of Gettysburg.

He was born in York, South Carolina. He is buried in Aimwell Cemetery in Ridgeway, South Carolina.
