= Carpenter, Lakeside, and Springvale Cemeteries =

Cemeteries in East Providence, Rhode Island, US

- U.S. National Register of Historic Places
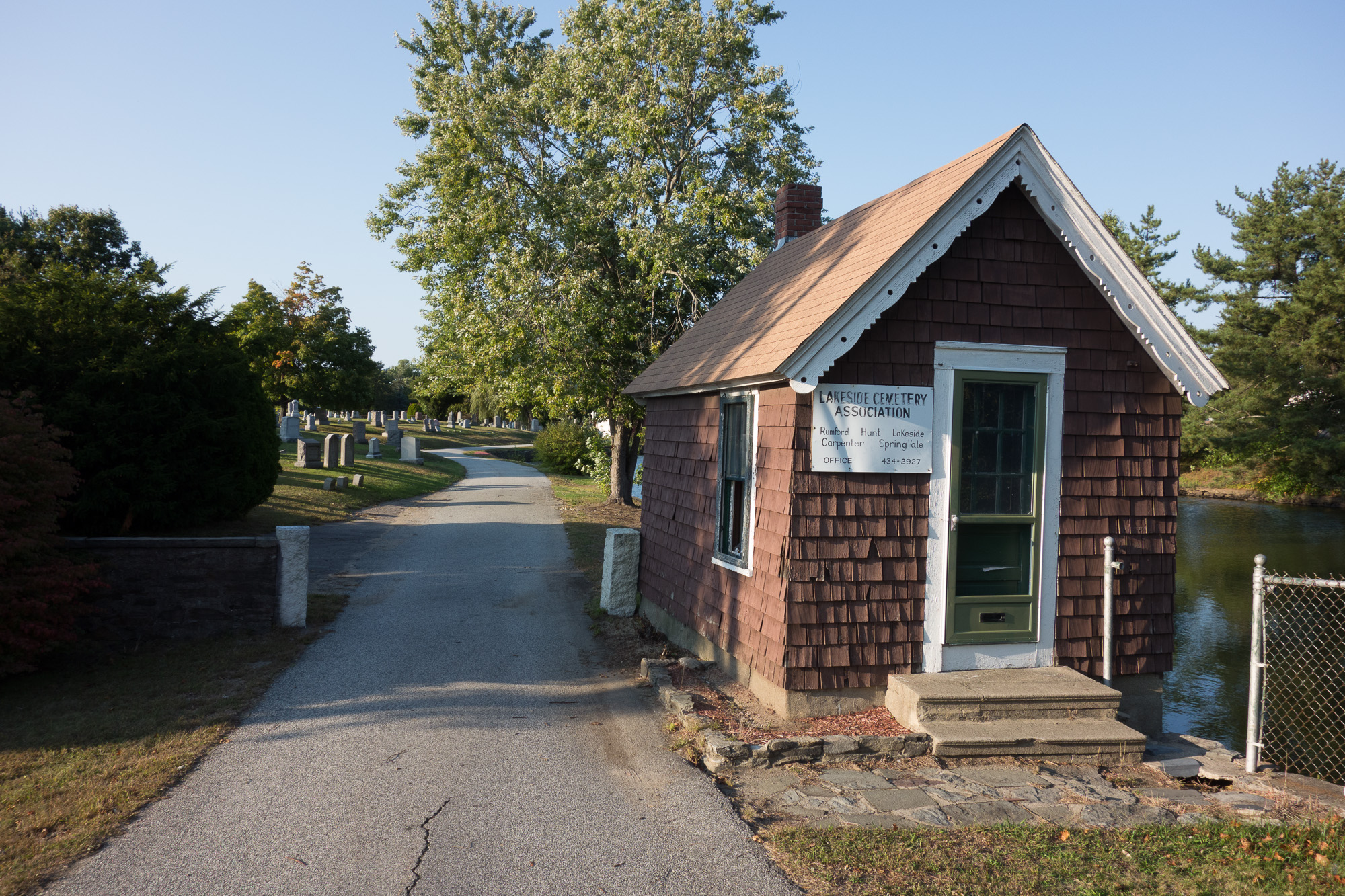

- Location within Rhode Island Location within the United States
- Location: Newman and Pawtucket Aves., East Providence, Rhode Island
- Coordinates: 41°50′33″N 71°21′9″W
- Area: 20 acres (8.1 ha)
- Built: 1844
- MPS: East Providence MRA
- NRHP reference No.: 80000091
- Added to NRHP: November 28, 1980

The Carpenter, Lakeside, and Springvale Cemeteries are historic cemeteries located on Newman and Pawtucket Avenues in East Providence, Rhode Island, United States. The three cemeteries occupy a triangular area bounded by Newman and Pawtucket Avenues to the east and south, and railroad tracks to the west. Carpenter Cemetery, the oldest, was established in 1844. Springvale was established in 1888 and Lakeside in 1895. The area is one of the few remaining undeveloped areas of what was once a "ring of green" around the historic center of Rehoboth, which was near this area.

The cemeteries were listed on the National Register of Historic Places in 1980.

== See also ==
- National Register of Historic Places listings in Providence County, Rhode Island
- George N. Bliss – Civil War Medal of Honor recipient who is buried at Lakeside–Carpenter
