= Robert Alexander Caskie =

Robert A. Caskie
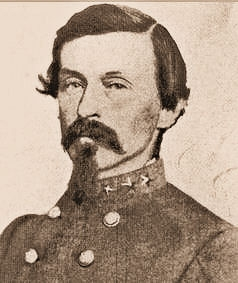
- Died: August 31, 1928 (aged 98); Philadelphia, Pennsylvania, US
- Military career
- Allegiance: Confederate States
- Branch: Confederate States Army
- Rank: Colonel
- Battles: American Civil War (WIA)

Robert Alexander Caskie (1829/30 – August 31, 1928) was a Virginian officer in the Confederate States Army during the American Civil War.

== Life ==
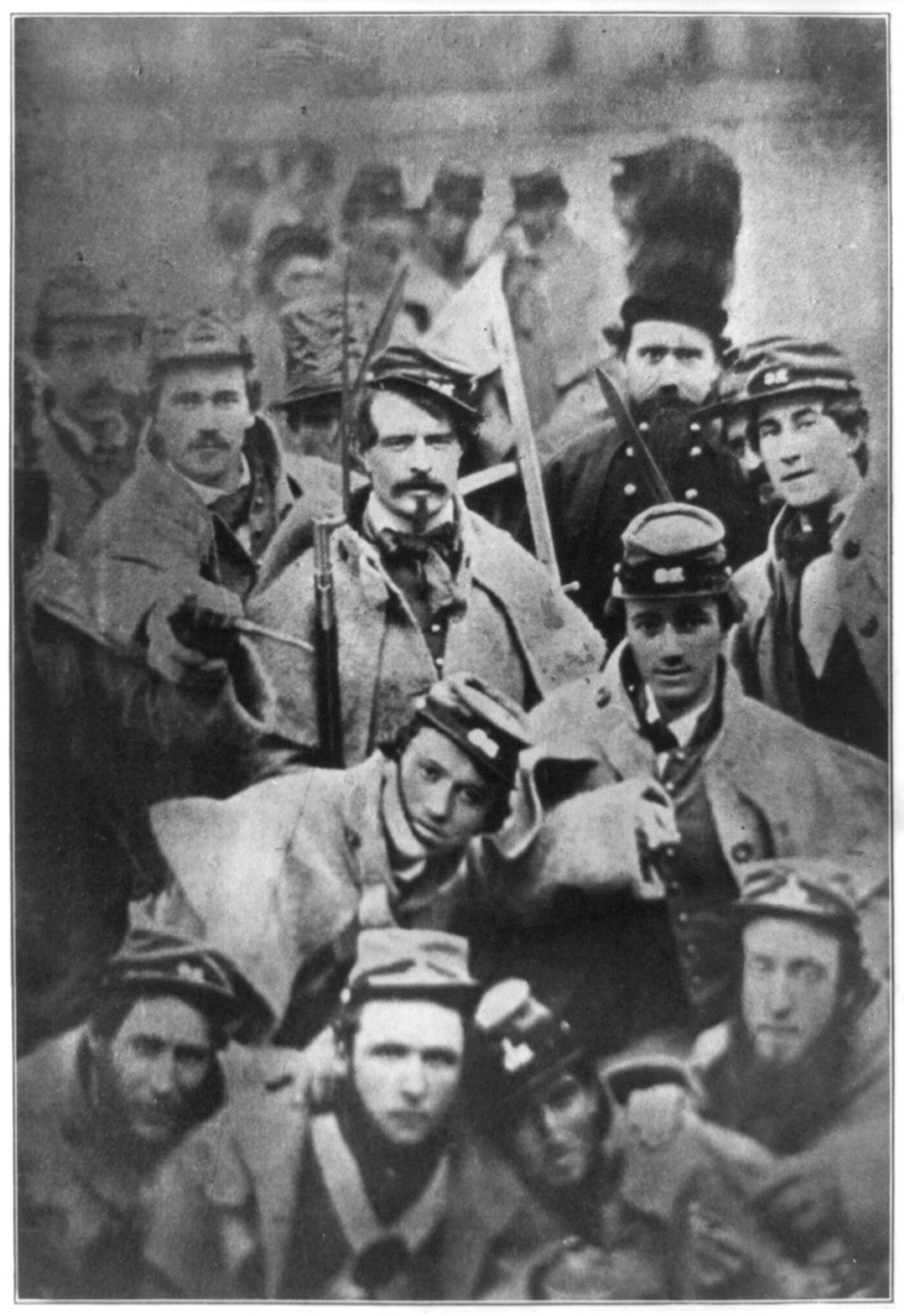
Richmond Grays at execution of John Brown in Charles Town, West Virginia, 1859

Robert Alexander Caskie, son of John Caskie, Esq., of Richmond, Virginia, and latterly of Missouri, was a descendant of one of the oldest families of Virginia. During the Civil War he was the quartermaster of the Richmond Grays and the organizer and leader of Caskie’s Mounted Rangers, a band of cavalry. Later he became liaison officer, serving Generals Lee, Jackson and Stuart. He fought in many battles and once was seriously wounded.

Caskie died on August 31, 1928, at the home of his son, John J. Kerr Caskie, in Merion, a suburb of Philadelphia. He was ninety-eight years old.

== Personal life ==
In 1859 Colonel Caskie was married to Amanda Wallace Gregory, daughter of Judge Munford Gregory, sometime Governor of Virginia. His wife died several years before him. Two daughters, Mrs. M. C. Plass, of Washington, and Mrs. A. C. Thomas, of Paris, France, and two sons survived him. One son, John J. K. Caskie, became general counsel of the Philadelphia Rapid Transit Company. Edmund W. Caskie, the other son, was a resident of New York.

== Sources ==
- Lewis, Virgil A.; Brock, R. A. (1888). Virginia and Virginians: Eminent Virginians. Vol. 1. Richmond and Toledo: H. H. Hardesty. p. 203.
- "Aged Confederate Veteran Is Dead". Daily Press (Newport News, Virginia). September 1, 1928. p. 1.
- "Col. Robert A. Caskie Dies". St. Louis Post-Dispatch. August 31, 1928. p. 3.
