= 1st Rhode Island Cavalry Regiment =

- Active: Between December 1861 and March 1862 to August 3, 1865
- Country: United States
- Allegiance: Union
- Branch: Union Army
- Type: Cavalry
- Part of: In 1862, Hatch's Cavalry Brigade, Nathaniel Banks' V Corps, Department of the Shenandoah
- Engagements: Second Battle of Bull Run; Battle of Chancellorsville; Gettysburg campaign Bristoe Campaign; Battle of Mine Run

The 1st Rhode Island Cavalry Regiment was a cavalry regiment that participated in the American Civil War. They were badly routed at the Battle of Middleburg, a blemish on an otherwise competent combat record.

== History ==
The 1st Rhode Island Cavalry Regiment was organized between December 1861 and March 1862 at Pawtucket as the 1st New England Cavalry. Late in that month, the regiment was sent to Washington, D.C., and initially assigned to Hatch's cavalry brigade in Nathaniel Banks' V Corps in the Department of the Shenandoah. Throughout the war, the regiment would be a part of many reorganizations of the cavalry, although the majority of its service was with the Army of the Potomac.

Most of the regiment's service in 1862 was in northern Virginia, where it served as scouts to determine enemy movements, as well as foraging for supplies and screening infantry movements. The troopers saw action contesting Stonewall Jackson's cavalry in the Valley Campaign. They fought in the Second Bull Run Campaign, as well as many other battles of note, including service in the cavalry actions surrounding the Battle of Fredericksburg.

In 1863, they participated in the Chancellorsville Campaign, and played an important role in the opening battle of the Gettysburg campaign at Brandy Station. Shortly thereafter, isolated and alone deep in Confederate territory on a scouting mission, they lost nearly 240 of their 280 remaining men at the June 17 skirmish at Middleburg. The regiment was refitted with new recruits and performed scouting and outpost duty along the upper Potomac River until September, when they rejoined the Army of the Potomac, participating in the Bristoe Campaign and Mine Run Campaign.

The following year, the 1st Rhode Island served in the defenses of Washington, D.C., before eventually returning to the Shenandoah Valley under the command of Philip H. Sheridan. Due to heavy battle losses, the regiment was consolidated to a battalion of four companies on January 1, 1865. They continued serving in the valley for much of the rest of the war before being mustered out at Baltimore, Maryland on August 3, 1865.

During the war, the regiment lost 1 officer and 16 enlisted men killed and mortally wounded, and 2 officers and 77 enlisted men to disease. Hundreds more were wounded or captured. A total of 2,124 different men served in the regiment at various times, although its field strength normally was less than 500 effectives.

== Notable members ==
- Captain George N. Bliss – Medal of Honor recipient for action at the Battle of Waynesboro, September 28, 1864

== See also ==
- List of Rhode Island Civil War units
- Rhode Island in the American Civil War
