= 13th Virginia Cavalry Regiment =

- Flag of Virginia, 1861
- Active: July 1862 – April 9, 1865
- Country: Confederacy
- Allegiance: Confederate States of America
- Branch: Confederate States Army
- Type: Cavalry
- Size: Regiment
- Engagements: American Civil War: Battle of Fredericksburg; Battle of Brandy Station; Battle of Gettysburg; Bristoe Campaign; Mine Run Campaign; Overland Campaign; Siege of Petersburg; Appomattox Campaign

Commanders
- Notable commanders: John R. Chambliss Jr., Jefferson C. Phillips

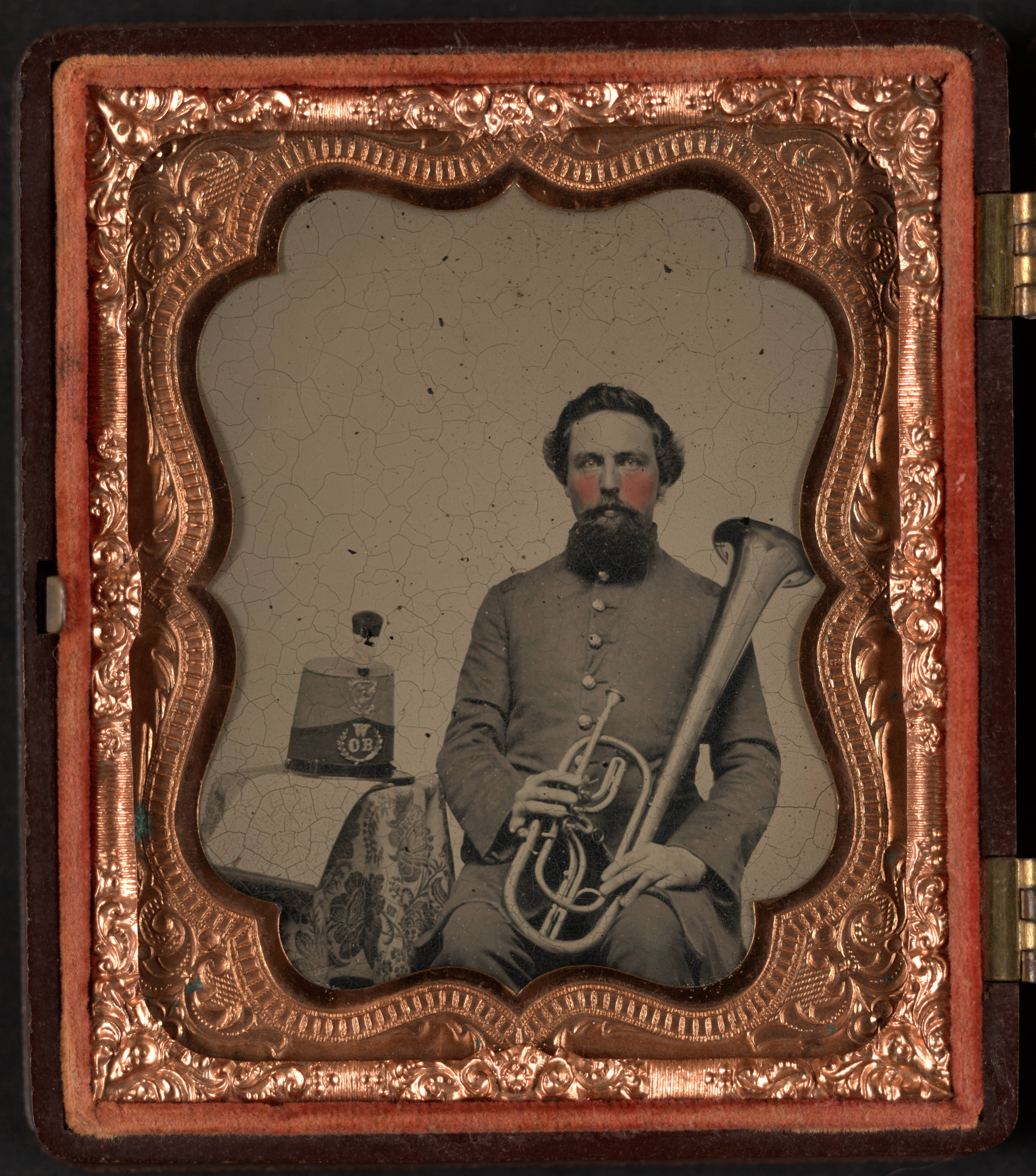
Unidentified soldier of Co. H, 13th Virginia Infantry Regiment with over-the-shoulder saxhorn

The 13th Virginia Cavalry Regiment was a Confederate cavalry unit organized in July 1862 in Virginia. It was formed from the existing 16th Virginia Cavalry Battalion and comprised companies raised primarily in Petersburg and the counties of Southampton, Sussex, Prince George, Surry, and Nansemond. The regiment served in the Army of Northern Virginia, initially under Maj. Gen. W.H.F. Lee and later under Brig. Gen. John R. Chambliss Jr.. It saw action in numerous engagements including Fredericksburg, Brandy Station, Gettysburg, and the Overland and Petersburg campaigns. The regiment mustered 298 men at Gettysburg and surrendered with just 88 at Appomattox.

== Organization ==
The 13th Virginia Cavalry originally consisted of ten companies (A through K), each drawn from specific counties:

- Company A – "Southampton Cavalry" (Southampton County)
- Company B – "Petersburg Light Dragoons" (Petersburg)
- Company C – "Randolph’s Dragoons" (Nansemond County)

Other companies were drawn from Sussex, Prince George, and Surry counties.

In December 1863, Col. John R. Chambliss Jr. was promoted to brigadier general and succeeded by Lt. Col. Jefferson C. Phillips as regimental commander. The unit remained part of Chambliss’s, then Beale’s Brigade in W.H.F. Lee’s Division until war’s end.

== Service history ==
=== 1862–1863 ===
At the Battle of Fredericksburg (December 1862), the regiment screened Confederate flanks and patrolled river crossings. In spring 1863, it participated in cavalry clashes along the Rappahannock, including actions at Beverly Ford during the Stoneman Raid.

During the Gettysburg campaign, the regiment was engaged at Brandy Station, Aldie, and Middleburg. At Gettysburg, the 13th fought dismounted on East Cavalry Field on July 3, 1863, and supported Confederate cavalry charges. Some troopers skirmished around the Rummel Farm. Chambliss’s Brigade, including the 13th Virginia, reported 8 killed, 41 wounded, and 25 missing during this engagement.

Lt. Col. Phillips was wounded during the retreat, and Major Benjamin F. Winfield temporarily assumed command.

=== 1864–1865 ===
In the Overland Campaign, the 13th Virginia fought in the Battle of the Wilderness, Spotsylvania Court House, North Anna, and Cold Harbor. It screened infantry movements and engaged in frequent skirmishes.

It participated in the Siege of Petersburg from June 1864 until April 1865, including fighting at Jones’s Farm and Vaughan Road. During the Appomattox Campaign, it was engaged in rear guard actions and surrendered at Appomattox Court House on April 9, 1865, with 10 officers and 78 enlisted men remaining.

== Casualties and strength ==
13th Virginia Cavalry strength and losses
Date	Officers Present	Enlisted Men	Total
July 1863 (Gettysburg)	—	298	298
April 9, 1865 (Surrender at Appomattox)	10	78	88

Chambliss’s Brigade suffered 8 killed, 41 wounded, and 25 missing at Gettysburg.

== Commanders ==
- Col. John R. Chambliss Jr. – Original commander, promoted to brigadier general in 1863. Killed at Deep Bottom in August 1864.
- Col. Jefferson C. Phillips – Succeeded Chambliss, led the regiment through Appomattox.
- Lt. Col. Alexander H. Savage
- Lt. Col. Thomas H. Upshaw
- Maj. Benjamin W. Belsches
- Maj. Joseph E. Gillette
- Maj. Benjamin F. Winfield – Took command during Gettysburg retreat.

== Legacy ==
A monument to Chambliss’s Brigade stands on East Cavalry Field at Gettysburg. It includes the 13th Virginia Cavalry and commemorates their charge on July 3, 1863. Veterans of the regiment participated in postwar Confederate reunions in Virginia, and unit histories such as Daniel T. Balfour’s Thirteenth Virginia Cavalry (1986) help preserve the regiment’s memory.

== See also ==
- List of Virginia Civil War units
- Confederate States Army
- Army of Northern Virginia
