= Maryland Scroll =

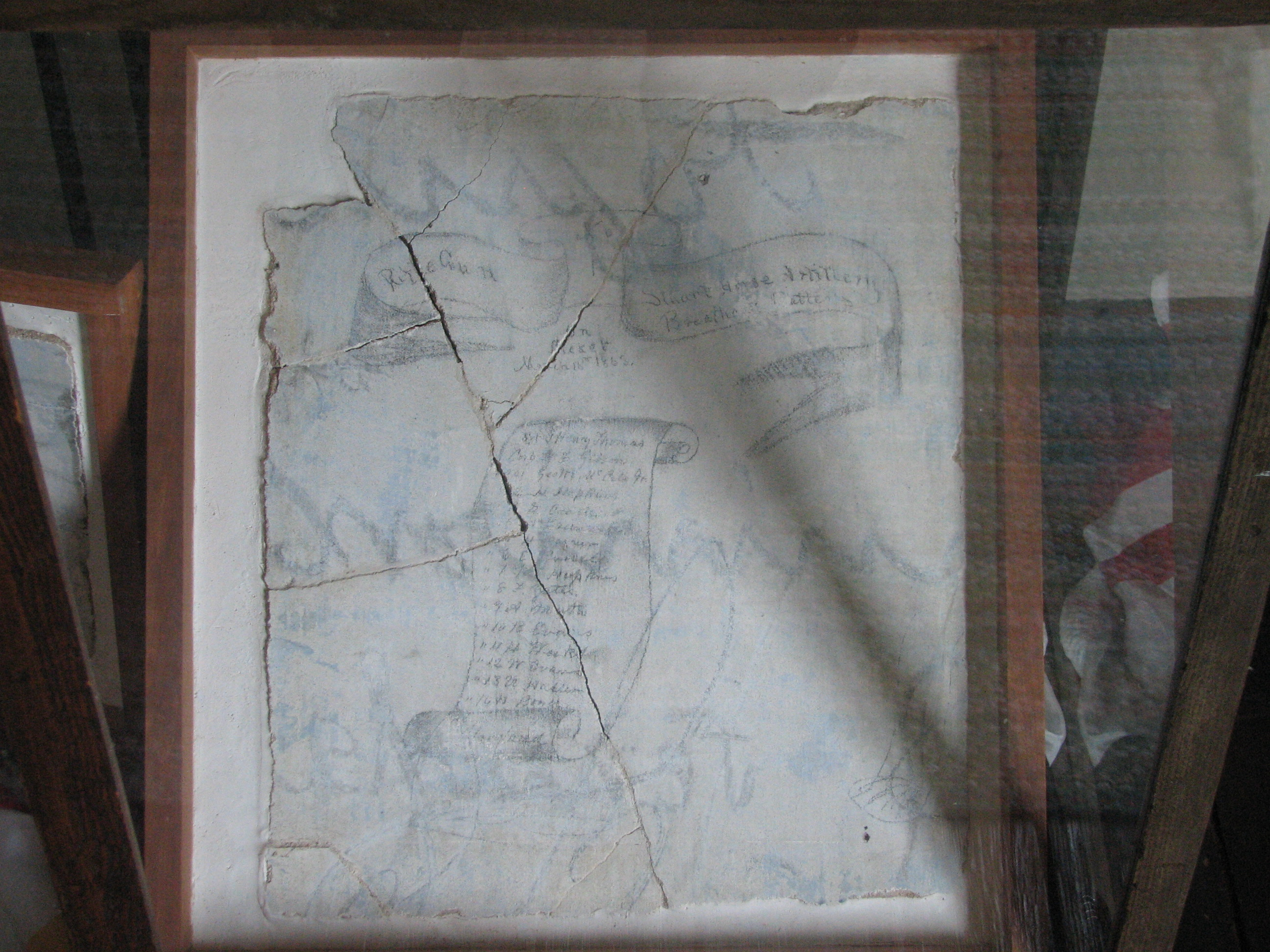
Maryland Scroll

The Maryland Scroll is an American Civil War artifact. It consists of a pencil drawing of a scroll with an unfurling banner above it. It was drawn on March 16, 1863, by one or more unknown members of James Breathed's Battery on the wall of the Graffiti House, in Brandy Station, Virginia.

== Scroll contents ==
The unfurling banner (also known as the horizontal scroll) reads: "Rifle Gun" and "No. 1, Stuart Horse Artillery / Breathed's Battery / On Picket - March 16, 1863"

The main scroll, or vertical scroll lists the names of fourteen soldiers in the artillery unit, as well as two officers: Sgt. Henry Thomas and Cpl. F. Gibson.

The other names on the scroll (which are numbered 1 to 14) in order: George W. McCabe, H. Hopkins, S. Owens, H Greenwell, H. Wagner, E. Russell, W. Hopkins, F. Yates, A Muth, B. Evans, H. Wickes, W. Evans, U. Haller, and H. Boyd.

On March 17, 1863, the day after the scroll was created, the men named on it fought at the Battle of Kelly's Ford.

== History ==
Used as a hospital and meeting place by both Union and Confederate armies during the Civil War, the house now known as the Graffiti House was near demolition in 1993. When salvage efforts uncovered the extensive historical graffiti in the upper floor of the house, the Maryland Scroll was removed from the wall and placed in a private collection of Civil War memorabilia. The people of nearby Culpeper, Virginia sought to have the scroll returned to the Graffiti House, and this was accomplished in January 2004 after the acquisition of the scroll by the Brandy Station Foundation. The scroll currently sits in a glass case in the house's "South Room", with a photograph on the wall showing its original position. '
