= Battle of Kelly's Ford =

Battle of the American Civil War

Coordinates: 38.476921°N 77.779880°W

- Part of the American Civil War
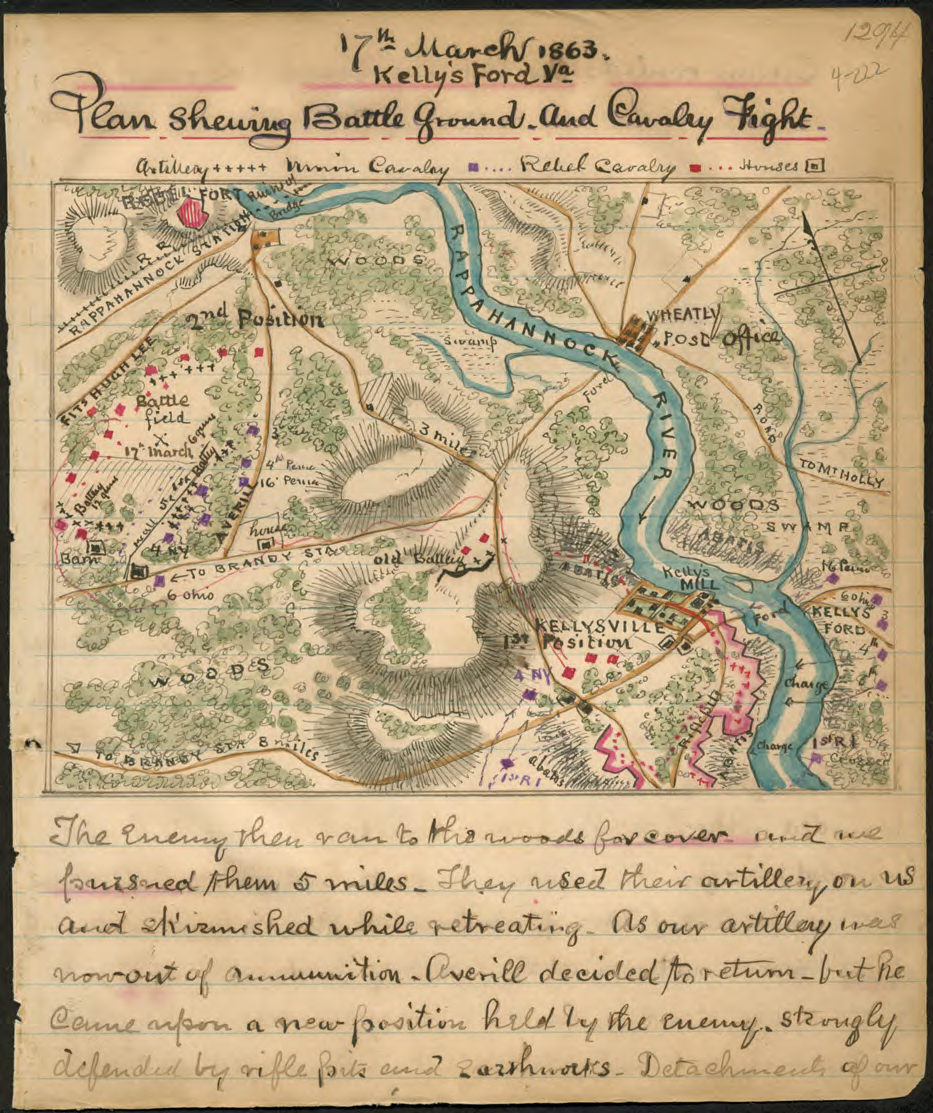
- Plan showing battleground and cavalry fight, March 17, 1863, Kelly's Ford, Virginia.
Date	March 17, 1863
Location	Culpeper County, Virginia; Fauquier County, Virginia
Result	Inconclusive

Belligerents
United States (Union)	(Confederate States of America) CSA (Confederacy)

Commanders and leaders
William W. Averell	Fitzhugh Lee

Strength
2,100	800

Casualties and losses
78 total 6 killed 50 wounded 22 missing	133 total 11 dead 88 wounded 34 captured

The Battle of Kelly's Ford, also known as the Battle of Kellysville or Kelleysville, took place on March 17, 1863, in Culpeper County, Virginia, as part of the cavalry operations along the Rappahannock River during the American Civil War. It set the stage for Brandy Station and other cavalry actions of the Gettysburg campaign that summer. Twenty-one hundred troopers of Brig. Gen. William W. Averell's Union cavalry division crossed the Rappahannock to attack the Confederate cavalry that had been harassing them that winter. Brig. Gen. Fitzhugh Lee counterattacked with a brigade of about 800 men. After achieving a localized success, Union forces withdrew under pressure in late afternoon, without destroying Lee's cavalry.

== Background ==
When Maj. Gen. Ambrose Burnside was relieved of command of the Union's Army of the Potomac (following the disastrous Battle of Fredericksburg in December 1862 and the fiasco of his Mud March in January 1863), his replacement, Maj. Gen. Joseph Hooker, immediately began reorganizing and training his army, in winter quarters outside of Fredericksburg. One of his most significant actions was to combine smaller cavalry units, spread out across the army, into a single Cavalry Corps, led by Maj. Gen. George Stoneman. Up until this time, the Union cavalry had been consistently outperformed by their Confederate counterparts, commanded by Maj. Gen. J.E.B. Stuart. Although they possessed superior equipment and had the advantage of a plentiful supply of men and federal horses, the Union cavalrymen had lacked the confidence, experience, and leadership to challenge Stuart. On February 25, 1863, Confederate cavalry under Brig. Gen. Fitzhugh Lee, one of Stuart's key subordinates and a nephew of Gen. Robert E. Lee, led a force of 400 troopers in a raid near Hartwood Church in Stafford County, 9 miles northwest of Fredericksburg. The federal cavalry was ineffective in pursuing Lee and managed to lose 150 prisoners from the division of Brig. Gen. William W. Averell, one of Fitz Lee's closest friends at West Point. Hooker was furious and threatened to relieve Stoneman of his command if he did not stop Confederate raids of this type.

At the same time, Fitzhugh Lee was sending his old friend and classmate taunting messages across the river. One of the more challenging messages said "I wish you would put up your sword, leave my state, and go home. You ride a good horse, I ride a better. If you won't go home, return my visit, and bring me a sack of coffee.".

Scouts from Averell's 2nd Division, Cavalry Corps, detected Confederate cavalry near Culpeper Court House about three weeks later. Averell assembled a force of 3,000 cavalrymen and six artillery pieces (the 6th Battery, New York Light Artillery, under Captain Joseph W. Martin) and set off for Kelly's Ford on the Rappahannock River between Fauquier and Culpeper Counties. After various troops were detached to cover his movements and to engage the enemy's pickets at Rappahannock Station, he had 2,100 men ready for battle in three brigades, commanded by Col. Alfred N. Duffié, Col. John B. McIntosh, and Capt. Marcus Reno. Facing him was a detached Confederate brigade commanded by Fitzhugh Lee, 800 men in five regiments, with a two-gun artillery section.

The "Maryland Scroll," a graffiti on the wall of the "Graffiti House," in Brandy Station, Virginia, contains the names of 16 Maryland Confederates who served rifled gun #1 of James Breathed's Battery and were on picket duty in Brandy Station on March 16, 1863. The unfurling banner (also known as the horizontal scroll) reads: "Rifle Gun" and "No. 1, Stuart Horse Artillery / Breathed's Battery / On Picket - March 16, 1863." Breathed's Battery was heavily engaged at the battle on the next day.

== Battle ==
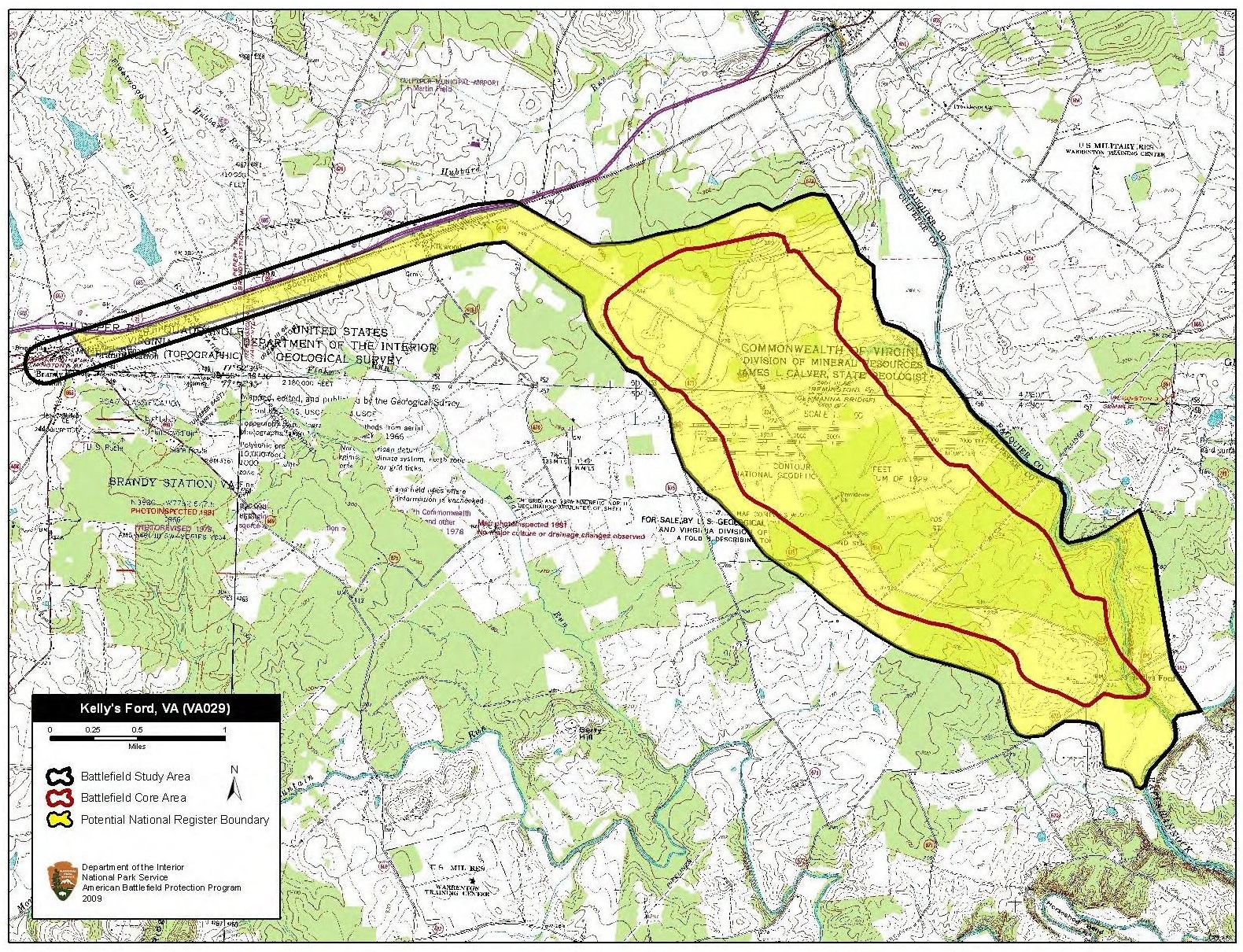
Map of Kelly's Ford Battlefield core and study areas by the American Battlefield Protection Program.

Early on the morning of March 17, 1863, Averell's advance guard reached Kelly's Ford on the Rappahannock and found that felled trees and 60 Confederate sharpshooters opposed their crossing. Three attempts to cross were repulsed under heavy fire, delaying the Union advance by over 90 minutes. Averell's chief of staff, Major Samuel Chamberlain, eventually forced a crossing led by 20 men of the 1st Rhode Island Cavalry. Chamberlain was wounded in the head. Despite the minor casualties in this action, Averell proceeded cautiously, taking over two hours to cross his men over the swiftly running river.

Lee, 10 miles west at Culpeper Court House, was notified of the crossing attempts by 7:30 a.m. Assuming that Averell's target was Brandy Station on the Orange and Alexandria Railroad, Lee sent his 800 men forward to block the Union advance. They encountered the Union cavalrymen deployed near the C.T. Wheatley house, about 2 miles northwest of Kelly's Ford. Duffié's brigade was positioned on the left in a woodlot, McIntosh's in the center, and Reno's two regiments of regulars on the right, behind a stone fence.

Jeb Stuart also happened to be at Culpeper Court House that day, attending a court-martial. He decided to ride out to witness the battle, taking with him his artillery chief, Maj. John Pelham. They arrived to find that Lee's men were not doing well, outnumbered two to one and facing a well-positioned artillery battery. It was the first time in the war that a Confederate cavalry regiment (the 2nd Virginia) had fled in the face of a Union charge.

Lee's men advanced with the five regiments in line abreast. The 3rd and 5th Virginia Cavalry regiments, led by sharpshooters, ran along the stone fence with the expectation they would find a gap in it somewhere. Pelham moved forward with Lee's men, and as he waved them through a gate in the fence, a shell exploded over his head, sending a tiny fragment of shrapnel into his brain, mortally wounding him. He died a few hours later. The Confederate advance was repulsed by carbine fire from the 16th Pennsylvania Cavalry and shelling from Martin's battery.

On the Union left, Duffié disobeyed Averell's orders to hold his position and ordered a charge. The surprise attack forced Lee to withdraw his men back through the woods to a clearing just behind. Lee counterattacked the advancing Union troopers, but once again had to fall back in the face of superior numbers and artillery. A rout of the Confederate position might have been possible, but Reno did not advance in support of Duffié, maintaining his position as ordered earlier by Averell.

== Aftermath ==
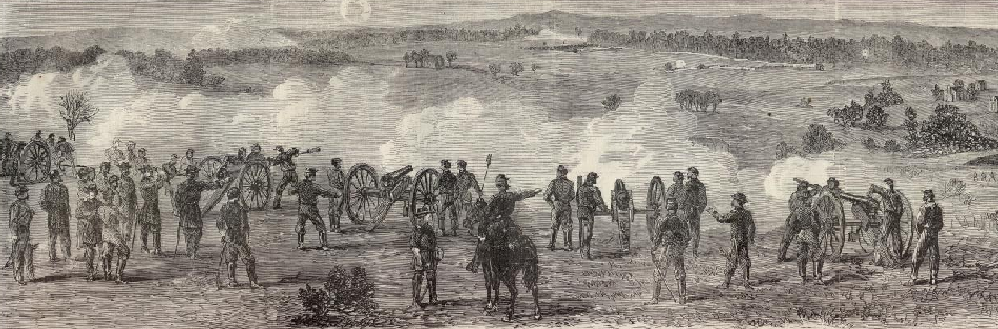
An illustration of the battle from the 1863 Harpers

By 5:30 p.m., Averell, citing his exhausted men and horses, "deemed it proper to withdraw." He left two Confederate officers who had been wounded and captured by Averell's troops, a sack of coffee, and the following message: "Dear Fitz, Here's your coffee. Here's your visit. How do you like it?" Some of his fellow officers believed that he lost his nerve, concerned about the presence of Jeb Stuart on the battlefield and, hearing the sound of railroad cars approaching, imagining the possibility of a Confederate infantry force pinning him against the river. The Union advance had covered 2 miles over more than 12 hours and resulted in 78 casualties (6 killed, 50 wounded, 22 missing). The Confederates lost 133 (11 dead, 88 wounded, 34 captured); 71 Confederate horses were killed and 12 were captured. The loss of the youthful Pelham, age 24, well respected by Robert E. Lee, Stuart, and many veterans of the Battle of Fredericksburg, was a shock. Stuart wrote after the battle, "The gallant Pelham—so noble, so true—will be mourned by the nation."

There were men in our lines who were engaged at Malvern Hill, at Gaines Mill, in many of Jackson's Battles, and with one accord they say that they never passed through such a fearful fire as thinned our ranks in that charge.

— The Richmond Whig, March 1863.

The Battle of Kelly's Ford proved to be a significant moral victory for Union forces. Prior to the battle, Stuart's horsemen had been successfully raiding the Union position for months, causing Union morale, especially that of its cavalry units, to plummet. The Federal cavalry's ability to hold its own against its Confederate counterpart for the first time in the war completely reversed such sentiments. Union forces, encouraged by this victory, would proceed into the 1863 summer campaigns with increased confidence. However, Confederate forces were able to achieve a tactical victory due to Averell's failure to convert his defensive success and untimely withdrawal, which left Lee's brigade in possession of the battlefield. One of the participants, Lt. Joseph A. Chedell of the 1st Rhode Island, wrote that Kelly's Ford was the "first real, and perhaps the most brilliant, cavalry fight of the whole war."

Both Union and Confederate armies used Kelly's Ford extensively during the Civil War. In addition to the role it played in this battle, it was also host to two notable engagements that occurred later that same year: the Battle of Brandy Station on June 9, 1863, and one during the Bristoe Campaign's Second Battle of Rappahannock Station on November 7, 1863.

== Battlefield preservation ==
The Civil War Trust (a division of the American Battlefield Trust) and its partners have acquired and preserved 1,370 acres (5.5 km^{2}) of the battlefield in five separate acquisitions since 2006. The well-preserved cavalry battlefield is on the south bank of the Rappahannock River within the C.F. Phelps Wildlife Management Area and includes hiking trails, interpretive markers and the "Gallant Pelham" memorial to Maj. John Pelham, the distinguished Confederate artillery officer who was mortally wounded at age 24 during the March 17 battle at Kelly's Ford and died the next day.
