= Culpeper Regional Airport =

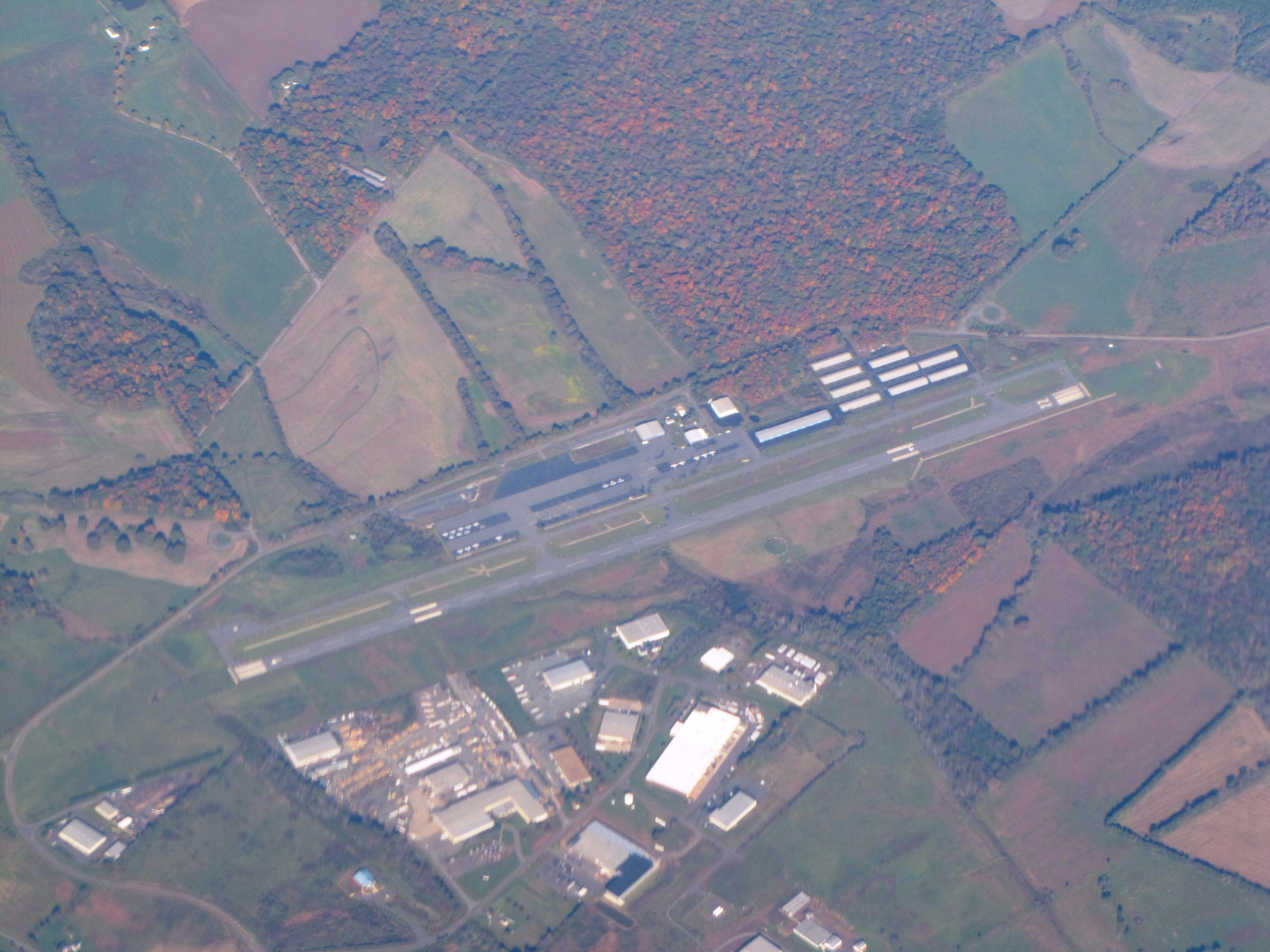
- IATA: none; ICAO: KCJR; FAA LID: CJR

Summary
- Airport type: Public
- Owner: County of Culpeper
- Serves: Culpeper, Virginia
- Location: Brandy Station, Virginia
- Elevation AMSL: 316 ft (96 m)
- Coordinates: 38°31′32″N 077°51′35″W

Map
- Location within Northern Virginia Location within Virginia

Runways
Direction	Length		Surface
Direction	ft	m	Surface
4/22	5,000	1,524	Asphalt

Statistics (2007)
- Aircraft operations: 55,767
- Based aircraft: 117
- Source: Federal Aviation Administration

Culpeper Regional Airport (ICAO: KCJR, FAA LID: CJR) is a county-owned public-use airport located seven nautical miles (13 km) northeast of Culpeper, a town in Culpeper County, Virginia, United States. Located in Brandy Station, Virginia, the airport opened in 1968. The runway originally measured 3200 ft. by 75 ft. In 1983, the runway was lengthened to 4000 ft. In 2004, the runway was expanded to 5000 ft. by 100 ft. It can handle corporate-size jets and large twin-engine aircraft. The airport has an airfest every October since 1998, with performances such as aerobatics.

== Brandy Station Battlefield ==
The airport is located within the core battlefield of Brandy Station, as defined by the American Battlefield Protection Program. It was the site of the largest cavalry battle in the western hemisphere. In the first phase of the Battle of Brandy Station, Confederate artillery was set up in a line, the east end of which was on the current site of the airport. Union cavalry charged on their position, but was repulsed, and the fighting went on further to the north.

== Facilities and aircraft ==
Culpeper Regional Airport covers an area of 301 acres (122 ha) at an elevation of 316 feet (96 m) above mean sea level. It has one asphalt-paved runway designated 4/22 which measures 5,000 by 100 feet (1,524 × 30 m).

For the 12-month period ending August 31, 2012, the airport had 66,067 aircraft operations, an average of 181 per day: 94% general aviation, 5% military and 1% air taxi. At that time there were 114 aircraft based at this airport: 90% single-engine, 4% multi-engine, 3% helicopter and 3% ultralight.
