= John Egbert Farnum =

American brevet general (1824–1870), convicted of slave trade

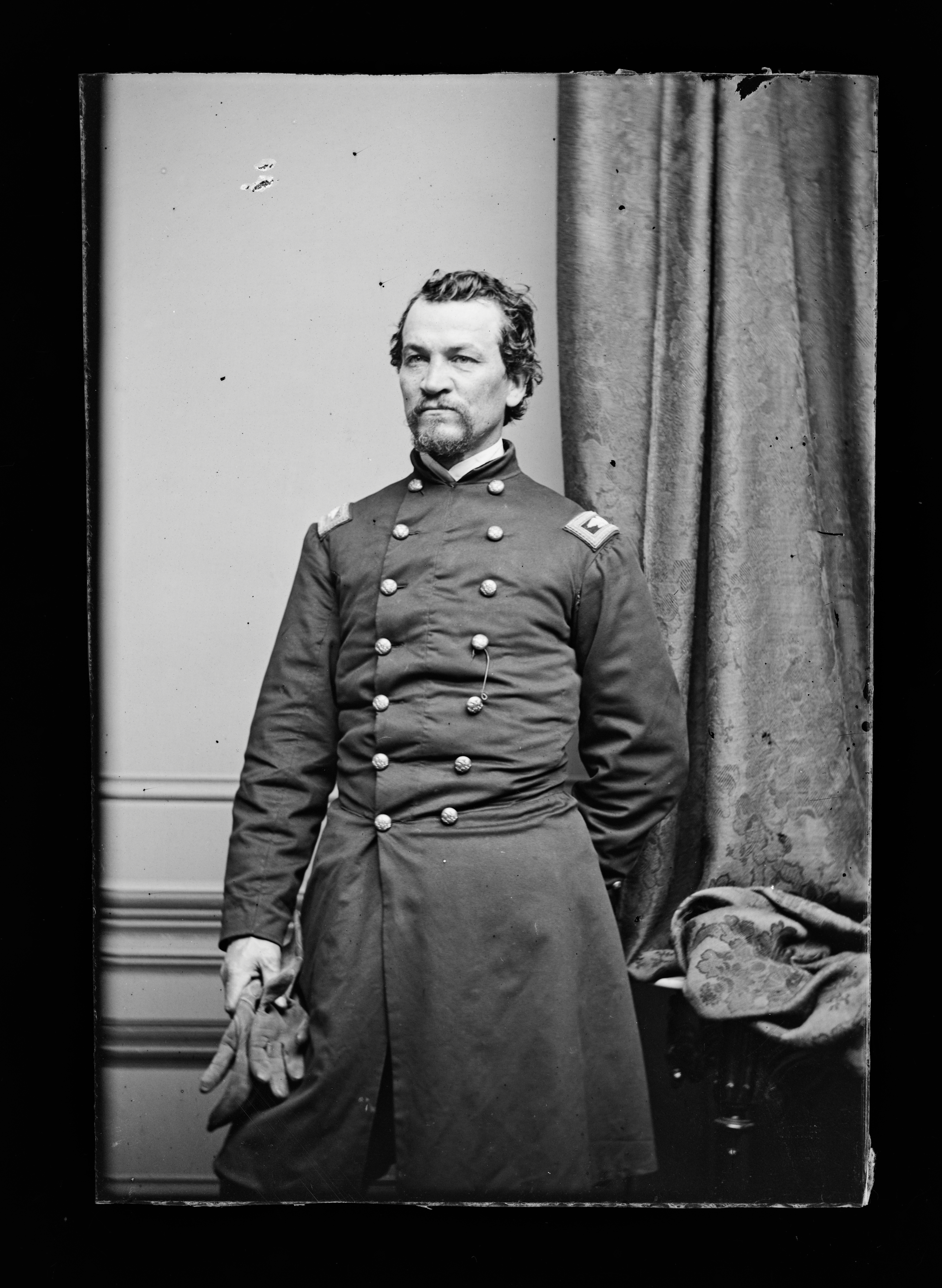
John Egbert Farnum (1824–1870), photo by Brady Studio

John Egbert Farnum (born in New Jersey, 1 April 1824; died in New York City, 16 May 1870) was a brevet general in the United States Army during the Mexican–American War and the American Civil War, and captain of the illegal slave ship Wanderer.

== Biography ==
Farnum was educated in Pottsville, Pennsylvania. In his youth, Farnum was an Overland express rider.

Farnum entered the army as sergeant-major of the 1st Pennsylvania Infantry in 1846, and served through the Mexican War. Subsequently he joined the Lopez expedition to Cuba which left New Orleans in 1850, and also took an active part in Walker's Nicaraguan expeditions. Still later he was captain of the slave yacht Wanderer, and was indicted at Savannah, Georgia, for carrying on illegal slave trade. He is said to have regretted this episode in his life.

At the beginning of the Civil War, he became major in the 70th New York Volunteer Infantry Regiment, which was raised and commanded by General Sickles. He distinguished himself for gallantry in all the engagements in which Sickles's brigade took part, and was promoted colonel of his regiment. At the Battle of Williamsburg, 5 May 1862, he was severely wounded, but recovered in time to take part in the battles of Fredericksburg, New Chancellorsville, and Gettysburg. (Colonel Farnum's name appears in the Graffiti House in Brandy Station, Virginia from this period.) He was then compelled by his wounds to abandon active service, and accepted the colonelcy of the 11th regiment of the veteran reserve corps, which he retained until the close of the war.

For his gallant and meritorious services, on February 21, 1866, President Andrew Johnson nominated Farnum for appointment to the grade of brevet brigadier general of volunteers to rank from January 3, 1866 and the U.S. Senate confirmed the appointment on April 10, 1866. Farnum was mustered out of the U.S. Volunteers on June 30, 1866.

Later he was appointed collector for the Port of New York and then inspector of customs in New York City, which office he held at the time of his death. After Farnum died in New York City on May 16, 1870, his "wreath-topped coffin" was carried from his house on Stuyvesant Street by a "regiment of national guard Zouaves, resplendent in red hats, red trousers, and ceremonial jackets." Farnum was buried in Green-Wood Cemetery, Brooklyn, New York.
