= 70th New York Infantry Regiment =

- Active: June 1861 – July 1, 1864
- Country: United States of America
- Branch: Union Army (Excelsior Brigade)
- Type: Infantry
- Size: 1,100
- Nickname(s): "First Excelsior Regiment"
- Engagements: American Civil War: Siege of Yorktown; Battle of Williamsburg; Battle of Seven Pines/Fair Oaks; Seven Days Battles; Manassas Station Operations; Second Battle of Bull Run; Battle of Fredericksburg; Battle of Chancellorsville; Battle of Gettysburg; Battle of Wapping Heights; Mine Run Campaign; Overland Campaign; Battle of the Wilderness; Battle of Spotsylvania Court House; Battle of North Anna; Battle of Totopotomoy Creek; Battle of Cold Harbor; Siege of Petersburg

Commanders
- Colonel: J. Egbert Farnum
- Lieutenant Colonel: William Dwight Jr.

Insignia
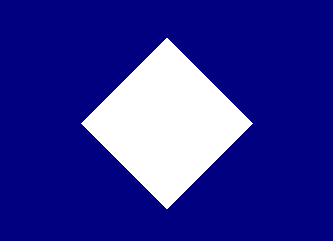
- 2nd Division, III Corps

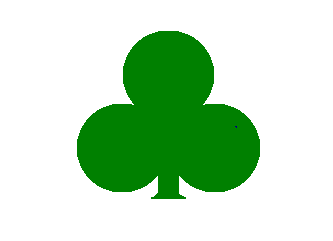
- 4th Division, II Corps

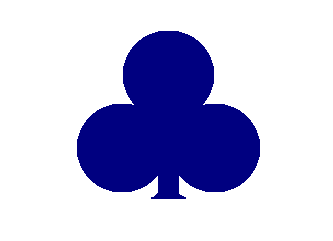
- 3rd Division, II Corps

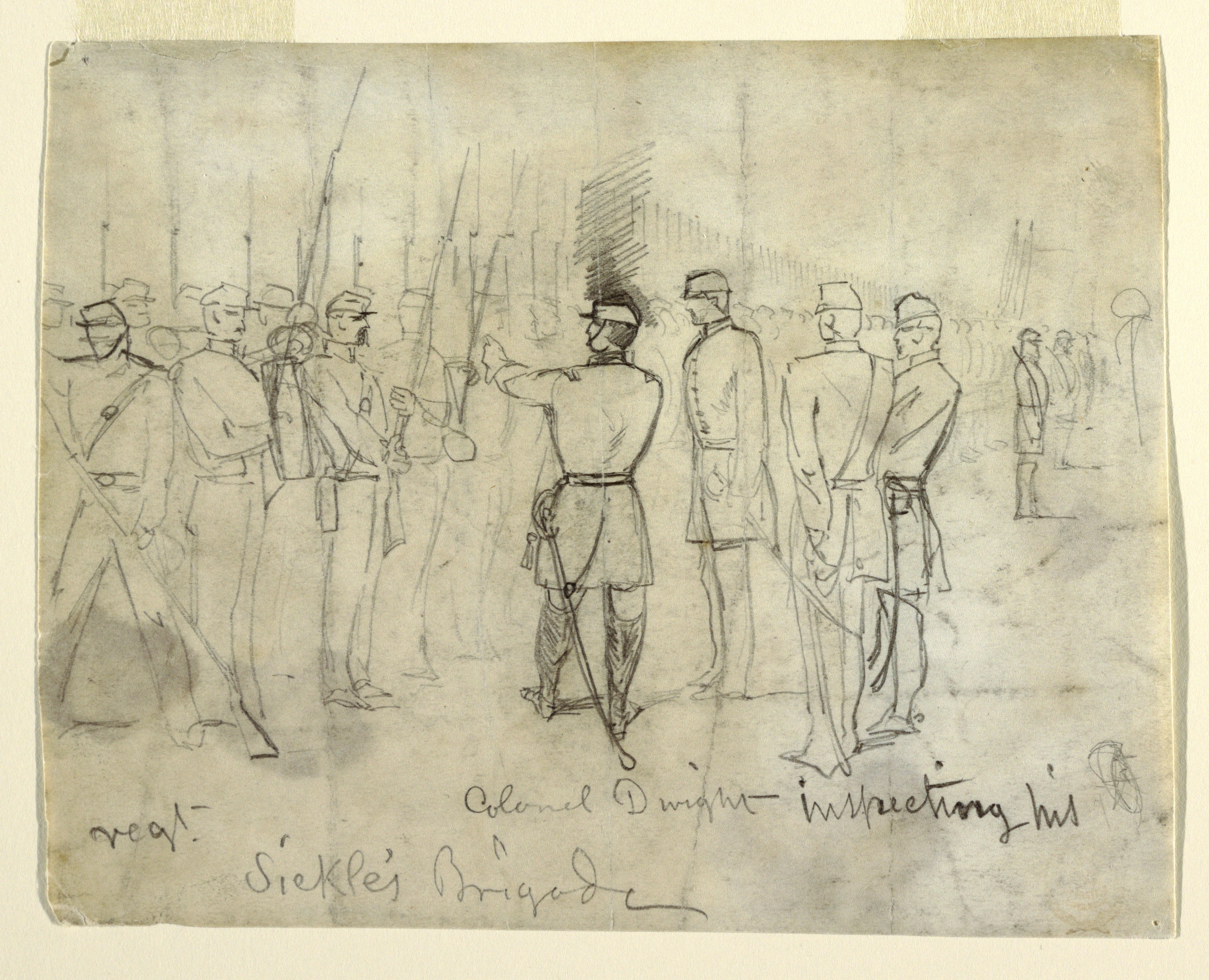
Col. William Dwight Jr. inspecting the 70th New York Infantry, 1862

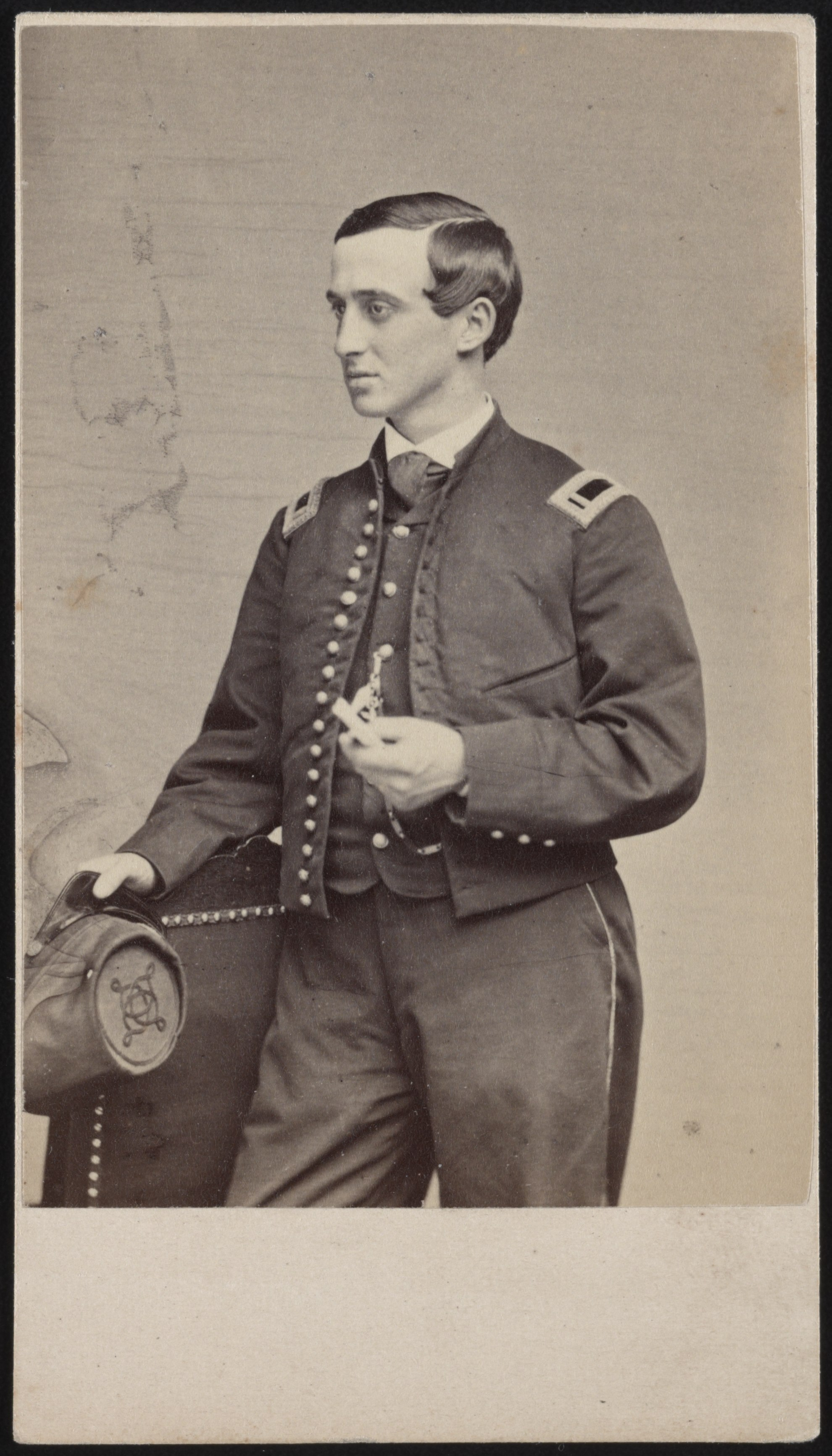
Second Lieutenant Charles T. Dwight of Co. B, 70th New York Infantry Regiment. From the Liljenquist Family Collection of Civil War Photographs, Prints and Photographs Division, Library of Congress

The 70th New York Infantry Regiment was one of five infantry regiments formed by former U.S. Congressman Daniel Sickles (Note: Born to a wealthy family in New York City, Sickles was involved in a number of scandals, most notably the 1859 homicide of his wife's lover, U.S. Attorney Philip Barton Key II, whom Sickles gunned down in broad daylight in Lafayette Square, across the street from the White House. He was acquitted after using temporary insanity as a legal defense for the first time in United States history. Upon the outbreak of the American Civil War in 1861, Sickles became one of the war's most prominent political generals, recruiting the New York regiments that became known as the Excelsior Brigade in the Army of the Potomac. Despite his lack of military experience, he served as a brigade, division, and corps commander in some of the early Eastern campaigns.) and established as part of the Excelsior Brigade which fought with the Union Army during multiple key engagements of the American Civil War, including the Chancellorsville, Gettysburg and Overland campaigns. Leaders from the 70th New York recruited men from New Jersey, as well as from cities and small towns across the State of New York.

== Service ==
The regiment was organized in New York City in May 1861 under the authority of the War Department as the 1st Regiment, Sickles' Brigade, at Camp Scott on Staten Island. It mustered into service on June 20, 1861. The 70th left the state for Washington, D.C., on July 23, 1861. It was subsequently attached to Sickles' Brigade, Division of the Potomac, until October, 1861. Then, it was reassigned to Sickles' Brigade, Hooker's Division, Army of the Potomac, until March 1862. (It was formally designated as the 70th Regiment New York Infantry on December 11, 1861.) The 70th was part of the 2nd Brigade, 2nd Division, Third Army Corps, Army of the Potomac, until March 1864. Then it was in the 2nd Brigade, 4th Division, Second Army Corps until May 1864. It finished the war in the 4th Brigade, 3rd Division, Second Army Corps, until July 1864.

Ordered to New York for muster out June 22, 1864. Veterans and Recruits were transferred to the 86th New York Infantry. The 70th mustered out on July 7, 1864, to date from July 1, 1864, after the expiration of its three-year term of enlistment.

The regiment lost during service 9 officers and 181 enlisted men killed and mortally wounded, and 2 officers and 62 enlisted men by disease for a total of 254 fatalities.

== Commanding officers and other notable members ==
- Colonel John Egbert Farnum: His name was marked in the Graffiti House in Brandy Station, Virginia, which served as the headquarters for a division of Third Corps, Army of the Potomac during the post-Battle of Gettysburg pursuit of Confederate General Robert E. Lee's army
- John N. Coyne: U.S. Medal of Honor recipient for capturing an enemy flag in the Battle of Williamsburg, Virginia on May 5, 1862

== See also ==
- List of New York Civil War regiments
