= William Dwight =

US Army general (1831-1888)

William Dwight Jr.
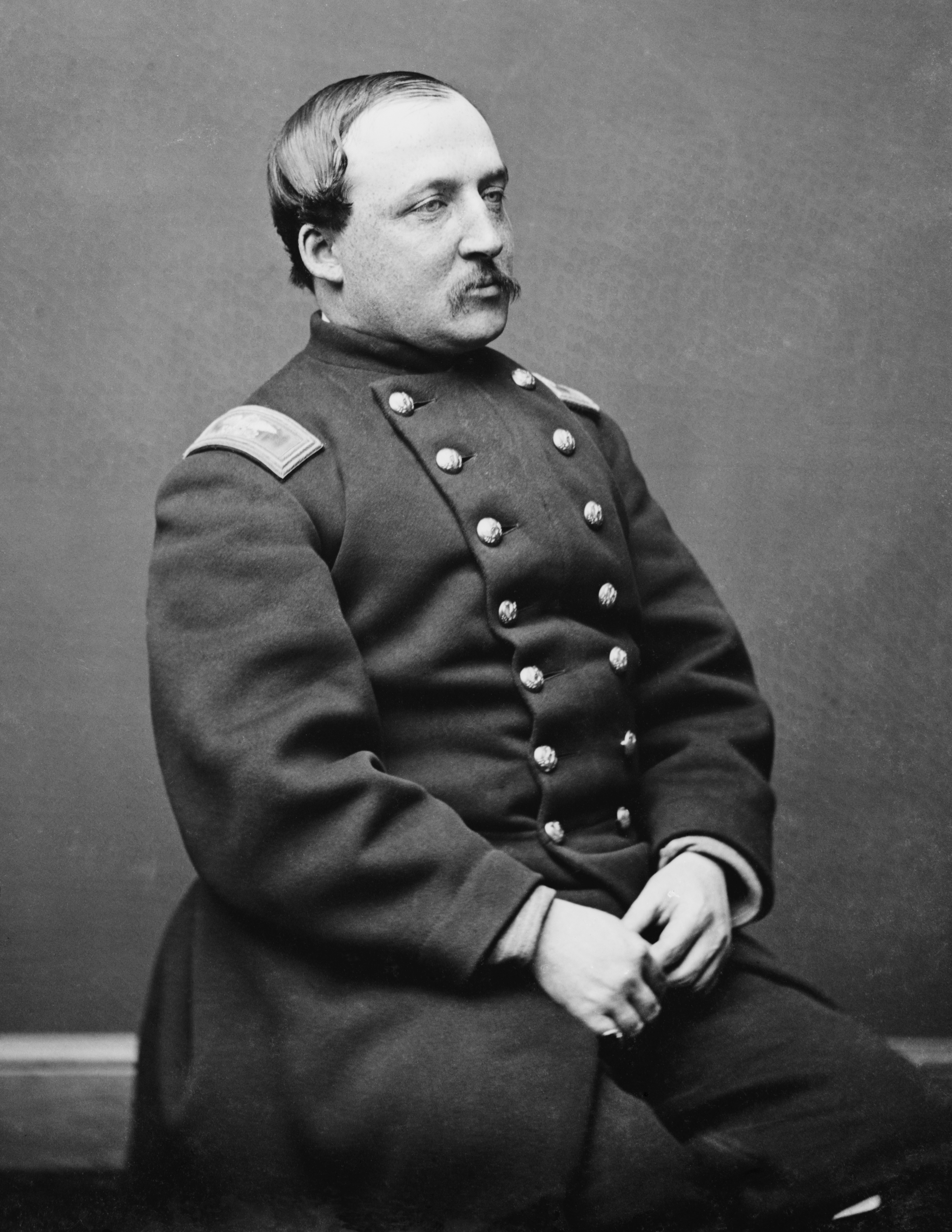
- As a colonel about 1862
- Born: July 14, 1831; Springfield, Massachusetts
- Died: April 21, 1888 (aged 56); Boston, Massachusetts
- Burial place: Forest Hills Cemetery, Jamaica Plain, Massachusetts
- Military career
- Allegiance: United States
- Branch: United States Army
- Service years: 1861–1865
- Rank: Brigadier General
- Commands: 70th New York Volunteer Infantry
- Conflicts: American Civil War

William Dwight Jr. (July 14, 1831 – April 21, 1888), was a general in the Union Army during the American Civil War. Raised in Massachusetts, he came from a notable family of military leaders.

== Early life ==
William Dwight, a member of the New England Dwight family, was born July 14, 1831, in Springfield, Massachusetts. His father, William Dwight, was born April 5, 1805. His mother was Elizabeth Amelia White, daughter of Judge Daniel Appleton White (1776–1861) and Mary Wilder (1780–1811).

Dwight was the second born son in a family of seven sons, three of whom, besides himself, served in the American Civil War. He was considered to be an out-spoken, boisterous, high-spirited boy, somewhat rude in his manner, sometimes troublesome, yet was said to possess a charm that made him well liked. The young Dwight also had a great love for the outdoor life and sport.

Starting in 1846 he attended a military preparatory school and was admitted to the United States Military Academy at West Point, New York, in 1849. However, he resigned January 31, 1853, and moved to Boston to work in manufacturing. On January 1, 1856, he married Anna Robeson.

== Civil War ==
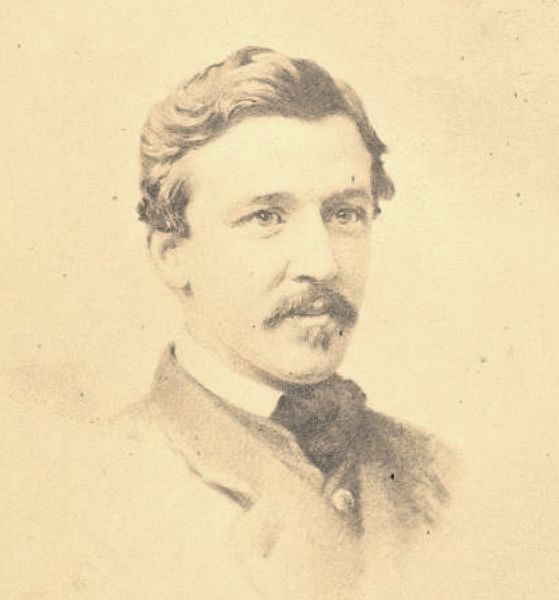
Wilder Dwight in younger years

Dwight was moving to Philadelphia for his business when the American Civil War broke out. He took a commission of captain on May 14, 1861. He was promoted to lieutenant colonel on June 29, 1861, under Daniel Sickles, and full colonel on July 1, 1861. As commanding officer of 70th New York Volunteer Infantry Regiment, Dwight led his regiment during the Battle of Williamsburg, where he was seriously wounded on May 5, 1862, along with losing half of his command. Left for dead on the battlefield, Dwight was found by Confederate forces and held as a prisoner of war until his eventual release in a prisoner exchange November 15, 1862.

In recognition of his gallantry on the field, Dwight was promoted to brigadier general of volunteers to rank from November 29, 1862, by Presidential nomination on March 4, 1863, and U.S. Senate confirmation on March 9, 1863. He was transferred to the Western Theater where, later in 1863, he led his brigade in the attack of Port Hudson, Louisiana.

He served as chief-of-staff to Maj. Gen. Nathaniel P. Banks during the Red River Campaign in early 1864, with service at the Battle of Mansfield and Battle of Pleasant Hill in De Soto Parish, Louisiana, Dwight was reassigned to the Eastern Theater and was attached to the 1st Division of the 19th Army Corps. Serving under General Philip H. Sheridan, Dwight later participated in the Valley Campaigns of 1864 and saw action at the battles of Winchester and Fisher's Hill before the end of the war.

Younger brother Wilder Dwight was born April 23, 1833, became lieutenant colonel the 2nd Regiment Massachusetts Volunteer Infantry, and died September 19, 1862, from wounds at the Battle of Antietam. Younger brother Howard Dwight was born October 29, 1837, became captain, and died May 4, 1863, during the Battle of Port Hudson. Another younger brother Charles Dwight was born May 5, 1842, attended Harvard University but left to join the army. Charles was lieutenant in the 70th regiment, taken prisoner in Libby Prison, but lived until March 9, 1884. Distant cousin Colonel Augustus Wade Dwight (1827–1865) died during the Battle of Fort Stedman.

Following the war, Dwight went into the railroad business in Cincinnati, Ohio, with another brother Chapman Dwight who was born April 30, 1844. He had one son, William Arthur Dwight, born June 3, 1867. William Dwight died on April 21, 1888, in Boston and was buried in Forest Hills Cemetery in Jamaica Plain, Massachusetts.

== See also ==
- List of American Civil War generals (Union)
- List of Massachusetts generals in the American Civil War
- Massachusetts in the American Civil War

== Sources ==
- Dwight, Wilder (1868). Life and letters of Wilder Dwight, Lieut.-Col. Second Mass. Inf. Vols. Boston: Ticknor and Fields.
- Benjamin Woodbridge Dwight (1874). The history of the descendants of John Dwight, of Dedham, Mass. Vol. 2. J. F. Trow & son, printers and bookbinders.
- Daniel Appleton White; Annie Frances White Richards (1889). The descendants of William White, of Haverhill, Mass: genealogical notices. American Printing & Engraving Company.
