= Charles J. Whiting =

Charles Jarvis Whiting
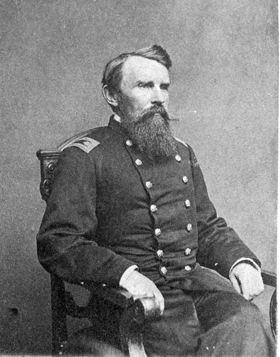
- Born: November 28, 1814; Lancaster, Massachusetts, United States
- Died: January 2, 1890 (aged 75); Castine, Maine, United States
- Burial place: Castine Cemetery in Castine, Maine, United States
- Education: United States Military Academy
- Spouse: Phebe Whitney (m. 1861–1890)
- Military career
- Allegiance: United States (Union)
- Branch: United States Army (Union Army)
- Service years: 1835 – 1836; 1855 – 1863; 1866 – 1871
- Rank: Lieutenant Colonel
- Units: 3rd U.S. Cavalry Regiment; 6th U.S. Cavalry Regiment
- Commands: 5th U.S. Cavalry Regiment; Reserve Bde., 1st Div., Cavalry Corps, AoP
- Conflicts: Second Seminole War; American Civil War; Manassas campaign; Battle of Hoke's Run; Peninsula campaign; Battle of Hanover Court House; Battle of Gaines' Mill (POW); Maryland campaign; Battle of Antietam; Fredericksburg campaign; Chancellorsville campaign; Stoneman's 1863 raid; Gettysburg campaign; Battle of Brandy Station

Charles Jarvis Whiting (1814-1890) was a United States Army officer who commanded a cavalry regiment, and briefly a brigade, during the American Civil War.

== Biography ==
=== Earlier years ===
Whiting was born on November 28, 1814, at Lancaster, Massachusetts but shortly moved to Castine, Maine where he spent the rest of his childhood. Whiting applied for the United States Military Academy but was initially rejected due to being too short but was later admitted the following year before graduating 4th in the Class of 1835. His first post was as Brevet Second Lieutenant in the 2nd United States Artillery on July 1, 1835. Whiting then served as an engineer in the Second Seminole War before resigning on May 31, 1836 to be a railroad surveyor at Florida and in 1838, served as an engineer in the Mississippi River delta before returning to Maine and founding the Military and Classical Academy at Ellsworth, Maine. Whiting then got married in 1841 but his wife died in 1847 leaving him as a widowed father with his only daughter, Anna Waterman Whiting and left his wife's family to raise the infant.

After teaching for six years, Whiting went to survey the new border between the United States and Mexico that was established by the Treaty of Guadalupe Hidalgo before settling at San Jose, California where he was a farmer and surveyor there and from 1850 to 1851, he served as Surveyor-General of California. When the reserves increased in 1855, Whiting re-enlisted in the United States Army and was appointed a captain of the 2nd Cavalry Regiment on March 3, 1855. He would go on to lead campaigns against the Comanche, giving him praise and being described as an ambitious martinet who was eager to advance his career.

=== American Civil War ===
In March 1861, Whiting was stationed at Fort Inge, Texas before Texas seceded from the Union, Whiting and some other officers were stranded in the fort before escaping via a steamboat. He was then sent to Carlisle Barracks to train recruits on basic cavalry tactics before briefly returning to Maine to marry Phebe Whitney. But soon returned to the frontlines where he was stationed at the defenses of Washington, D.C. and in the Manassas campaign where he fought in the Battle of Hoke's Run with a squadron in search of a militia regiment. However, during his movements, he never ceased to share his opinions of the militia as well as the politicians who started the war, reportedly being openly critical about them.

Later on, Whiting participated in George B. McClellan's Peninsula campaign but was captured during the Battle of Gaines' Mill when his horse was shot from under him. After spending some time at the infamous Libby Prison, he was paroled as he was exchanged for another officer and sent back to Washington where he was shortly promoted to major and was then made Major of the 5th Cavalry Regiment on July 17, 1862 which he then took to participate at the battles of Antietam and Fredericksburg as well as Stoneman's 1863 raid. Despite being one of the few senior majors remaining in the Union Army, Whiting assumed command of the Reserve Brigade when John Buford assumed command of the 1st Division of the Army of the Potomac's Cavalry Corps. The Reserve Brigade consisted of the corp's Regular Army elements; portions of the 1st, 2nd, 5th and 6th U.S. Cavalry regiments, as well as the 6th Pennsylvania Cavalry Regiment. He would serve as brigade commander for just a few weeks.

Whiting led the Reserve Brigade at the Battle of Brandy Station but due to his orders conflicting with Buford's orders, the Regular Army failed to save the 6th Pennsylvania in time and Whiting was relieved from his post and sent to Fort Preble. Where, after an incident that occurred on the fort with Benjamin Butler, Whiting was dismissed on November 5, 1863, for "disloyalty and for using contemptuous and disrespectful words against the President of the United States".

=== Incident with the Navajo ===
After his dismissal, Whiting returned to Castine to ponder his future until when in 1866, the United States Army was again looking for experienced officers for the Western Frontier and Andrew Johnson reinstated his rank of Major of the 3rd Cavalry Regiment. He was first stationed at Fort Marcy, New Mexico before transferring to Fort Union. In July 1867, a group of Navajo natives were suspected of having stolen livestock and when six soldiers died trying to recover the livestock, Whiting commanded the 3rd Cavalry to quell the peasant unrest and ensure peace between the settlers and the Navajo. Whiting later met up with the board of officials at Fort Sumner and came to the conclusion that the former post commander had provoked the Navajo.

=== Later years ===
On May 6, 1869, Whiting was promoted to Lieutenant Colonel and was transferred to the 6th Cavalry Regiment and was then stationed at Greenville, Texas to ensure peace during the Reconstruction Era. On 1870, Whiting was stationed at Fort Griffin but was honorably discharged on January 1, 1871, and went home to Castine. Whiting and his wife remained there but his back pain from Gaines' Mill grew worse and this eventually caused him to die on January 2, 1890.
