= Culpeper Battlefields State Park =

State park in Virginia, United States

- Location within Virginia Location within the United States
- Location: Culpeper County, Virginia
- Nearest city: Culpeper, Virginia
- Coordinates: 38°28′04″N 78°02′48″W
- Area: 263 acres (106 ha)
- Established: 2024
- Governing body: Virginia Department of Conservation and Recreation

Culpeper Battlefields State Park is a state park in Culpeper County, Virginia. The park was authorized for creation by Governor Glenn Youngkin on June 21, 2022 and officially dedicated on June 8, 2024. Many of the sites are already protected by other land preservation organizations. It is the first state park in Culpeper County and the northern Virginia Piedmont region.

The park features several disconnected battlefields where major engagements took place during the American Civil War, with primary focus on the Cedar Mountain battlefield, just south of Culpeper, and Brandy Station Battlefield, located northeast of the town. In addition, parts of the battlefields at Kelly's Ford and Rappahannock Station, and the Union winter quarters on Hansbrough's Ridge near Stevensburg are included in the park.

== History ==
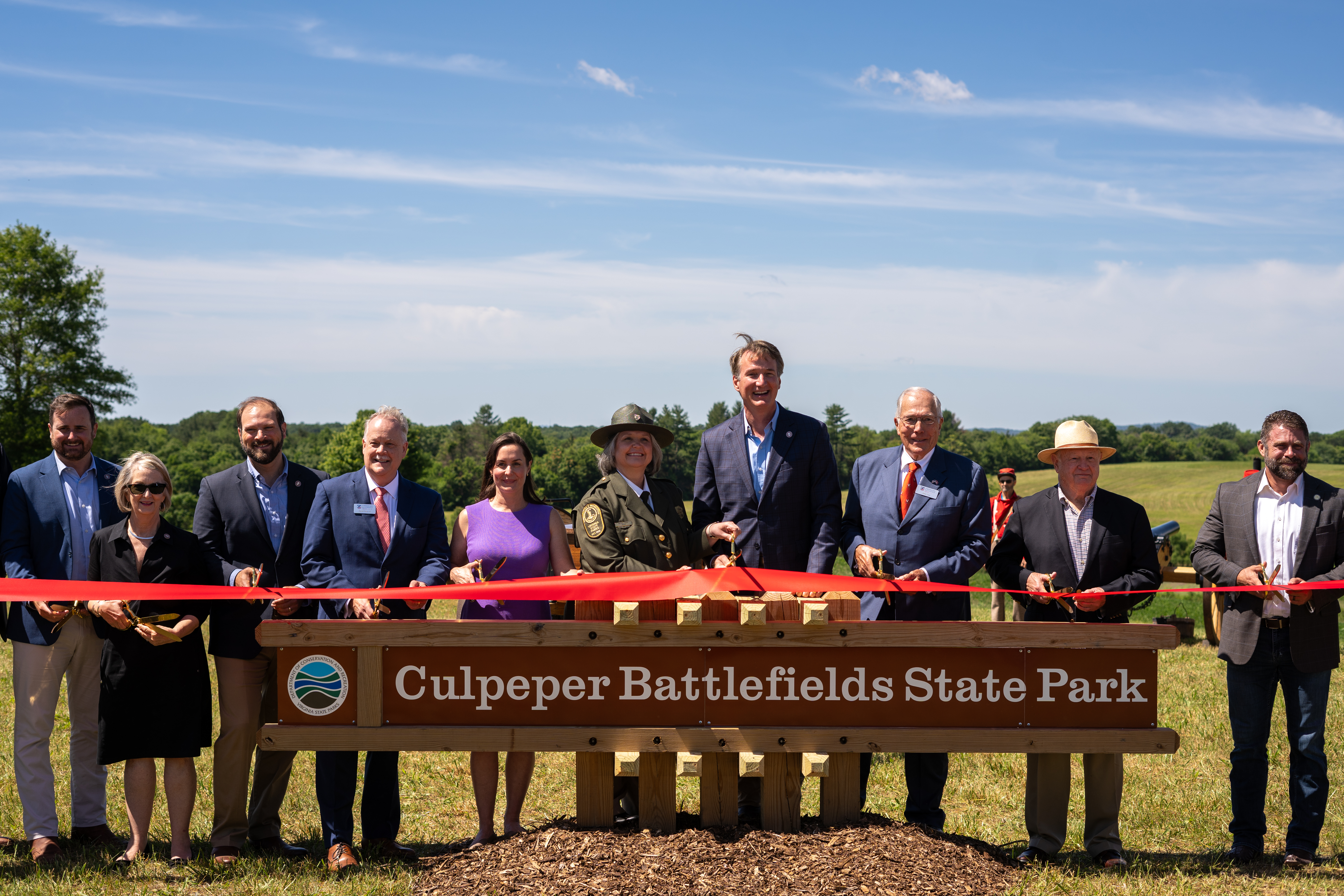
Governor Glenn Youngkin at the dedication for the park in June 2024

Culpeper County's geographic location between the Rapidan and the Rappahannock rivers made it high priority for both the Union and Confederate armies. At the Battle of Cedar Mountain, fought on August 9, 1862, a Confederate army under Maj. Gen. Thomas "Stonewall" Jackson pushed back Union forces under Maj. Gen. Nathaniel P. Banks attempting to capture the railway junction at Gordonsville. The Battle of Brandy Station, fought on June 9, 1863, came at the beginning of the Gettysburg campaign and featured the largest cavalry battle ever in North America. In addition to the many battles that took place in Culpeper County, the land is steeped in African American and Native American history. Thousands of escaped slaves fled Culpeper County across the Rappahannock River in an attempt to gain their freedom, with some returning to fight as free men.

== Details ==
The park currently comprises 263 acres (106 ha), but will grow to over 2,200 acres (890 ha) over the next few years through a series of planned acquisitions from American Battlefield Trust, Brandy Station Foundation and the Cedar Mountain Battlefield to the Virginia Department of Conservation and Recreation.

As required by the Code of Virginia, a state park master plan is currently in development. State park master plans cover all details of the park, including significance, size, locations of facilities, infrastructure, and development costs.

== See also ==
- List of Virginia state parks
