= Graffiti House =

Historic house in Virginia, United States

- U.S. National Register of Historic Places
- Virginia Landmarks Register
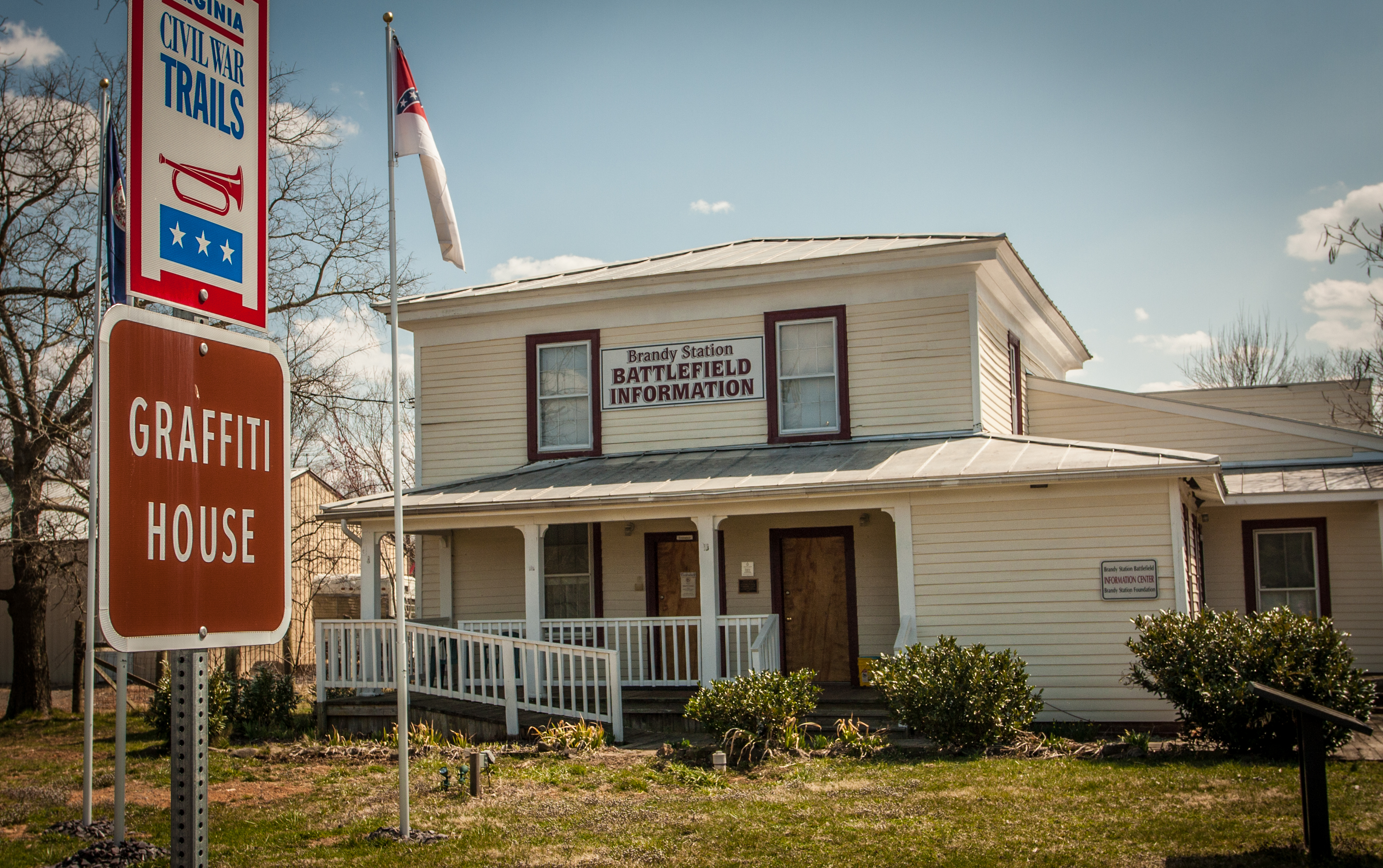

- Location within Virginia Location within the United States
- Location: 19484 Brandy Rd., Brandy Station, Virginia
- Coordinates: 38°30′15″N 77°53′27″W
- Area: less than one acre
- Built: 1862
- Architectural style: Greek Revival
- MPS: Civil War in Virginia MPS
- NRHP reference No.: 05001274
- VLR No.: 023-5092

Significant dates
- Added to NRHP: November 17, 2005
- Designated VLR: September 14, 2005

The Graffiti House, located at 19484 Brandy Road in the eastern end of the town of Brandy Station, Virginia, is believed by the Brandy Station Foundation to have been built in 1858. It is one of few dwellings in the village built before the American Civil War to survive intact to this day. The house is notable because of the Civil War era graffiti on many of the walls. The graffiti found includes names, drawings, names of units, and inscriptions left by soldiers.

== History ==
Because of its location on the Orange & Alexandria Railroad and the Carolina Road, the house, which was less than 0.25 miles (0.40 km) from the train depot, is thought by the Foundation to have been a commercial building as well as a dwelling. The Foundation reports that some graffiti has been removed or destroyed but considerable graffiti still remain. New graffiti were discovered as recently as December 2010.

The house was owned by James Barbour (brother of the railroad's president John S. Barbour Jr.) during the Civil War but the Barbour family's main residence was on a ridge about 1.5 miles (2.4 km) to the south (and during the war was used by Confederate General J.E.B. Stuart). Barbour served on the staff of Lieutenant General Richard S. Ewell until January 1863.

Because of its strategic location near the railroad, this house was used extensively by both the Union Army and Confederate States Army throughout the Civil War. Confederates used it as a field hospital during the Battle of Brandy Station and at other times when battles occurred in the area. It was probably used as a field hospital for wounded soldiers evacuated by train after the Battle of First Bull Run or First Manassas. The earliest known graffiti in the house date to the Second Manassas Campaign in August 1862, as the armies transited Culpeper County.

At the outset of the Gettysburg campaign, the Battle of Brandy Station, the largest cavalry battle ever to take place in North America occurred on June 9, 1863, in the fields adjacent to the Graffiti House and extended to the heights on which the main house stood. After the fighting ended, the lower house was used as a Confederate field hospital. Later that year, Federal troops occupied the building when the Army of the Potomac camped in Culpeper County during the winter of 1863–64. The house was headquarters to Brigadier General Henry Prince, a division commander in the Third Corps of the Army of the Potomac during the Union Army pursuit of the Army of Northern Virginia after its retreat from the Battle of Gettysburg, sometimes called the Rapidan campaign but this name could be confused with the beginning of the Overland Campaign, and during the Mine Run Campaign later in 1863.

The plaster walls on the house's second floor are covered with an outstanding and unique collection of charcoal and pencil graffiti left by soldiers from both armies. In addition to their autographs, the soldiers drew elaborate pictures of men and women, and wrote inscriptions commemorating their units and their battles. After the war, new paint and wallpaper led to their being forgotten. The graffiti were rediscovered during a renovation in 1993. The Brandy Station Foundation purchased the house in 2002, and its website lists the days it is open for viewing. The house includes a small museum and serves as a headquarters for the Brandy Station Foundation and the Foundation's visitor center for the Brandy Station battlefield.

== Graffiti that have been identified ==
Below is listed the names and units of those who have been identified in the Graffiti House:

- Sergeant Allen Bowman, Co. E, 12th Virginia Cavalry
- Private Michael Bowman, Co. H 7th Virginia Cavalry
- Private Hamilton Boyd, Breathed's Battery, Stuart Horse Artillery
- Private George Washington Butt, Norfolk Light Artillery (Huger's Battery)
- Private James A. J. Cooper, Co. A, 35th Battalion Virginia Cavalry (White's Comanche's)
- Captain Edwin Dillingham, 10th Vermont Infantry
- Private C. Benton Evans, Breathed's Battery, Stuart Horse Artillery
- Private William Evans, Breathed's Battery, Stuart Horse Artillery
- Colonel John Egbert Farnum, Commander, 70th New York Infantry
- Lieutenant Lyman C. Gale, Co. K, 10th Vermont Infantry
- Corporal Fayette Gibson, Breathed's Battery, Stuart Horse Artillery
- Private Thomas 'Herb' Greenwell, Breathed's Battery, Stuart Horse Artillery
- Private Uriah Haller, Breathed's Battery, Stuart Horse Artillery
- Private William J. Haney, 24th Battalion Virginia Partisan Rangers
- Private Henry 'Hal' Hopkins, Breathed's Battery, Stuart Horse Artillery
- Private William Hopkins, Breathed's Battery, Stuart Horse Artillery
- Private Bob Lewis, Norfolk Light Artillery (Huger's Battery)
- Private George McCabe Jr., Breathed's Battery, Stuart Horse Artillery
- Lieutenant William J. Marshall, Co. E, 12th Virginia Cavalry
- Lieutenant Joseph Moore, Norfolk Light Artillery (Huger's Battery)
- Private Edward Moreland, Norfolk Light Artillery (Huger's Battery)
- Private A Muth, Breathed's Battery, Stuart Horse Artillery
- Private George W. Orrison, Co. C, 35th Battalion Virginia Cavalry (White's Comanche's)
- Private David Owens, Breathed's Battery, Stuart Horse Artillery
- Private Robert Peed, Norfolk Light Artillery (Huger's Battery)
- Private David Owens, Breathed's Battery, Stuart Horse Artillery
- Private Dan Quinlan, Massachusetts Light Battery 'C'
- Private Elijah Russell, Breathed's Battery, Stuart Horse Artillery
- Maj. Gen. J.E.B. Stuart, Commander, Army of Northern Virginia Cavalry
- Sergeant Henry Thomas, Breathed's Battery, Stuart Horse Artillery
- Private Harry Wagner, Breathed's Battery, Stuart Horse Artillery
- Private Harry Wickes, Breathed's Battery, Stuart Horse Artillery
- Private Thomas 'Frank' Yates, Breathed's Battery, Stuart Horse Artillery

Below is listed the names of those who have not been identified in the Graffiti House:

- Lewis Metta
- Frank E. Kelly
- M Rown
- T.E. Kelly
- Emanuel
- A.L. Brynn

=== Notes on the names ===
- All the names of Breathed's Battery are found on the Maryland Scroll, created on March 16, 1863, the day before the Battle of Kelly's Ford, in which these artillery units participated.
- William Haney is believed to have served in four separate units
  - 30th Virginia Infantry
  - 13th Virginia Infantry
  - 24th Battalion Partisan Rangers
  - 35th Battalion Virginia Cavalry.

It is likely that he signed the walls of the Graffiti House while serving in the 24th Battalion Partisan Rangers.

- Robert Peed also identifies himself with Gannett's Artillery Battalion. Peed signed the walls in five locations.
- Allen Bowman signed the walls in two locations

==== Units separately identified ====
- 2nd New York Militia
- Louisiana Tigers
- 2nd Division 3rd Corps
- 10th New Jersey Infantry
- Stuart Horse Artillery
- Army of the United States of America
- Hill's Corps
- Gannett's Battalion
- Remember the Baltimore Artillery, September the 2nd, 1863

==== Events and locations identified ====
- Battle of Beverly Ford, April 16, 1863 (likely done by a member of either the 9th or 13th Virginia Cavalry)
- June 8, 1863 (possibly done by a member of the 1st SC Cavalry)
- "How are you Fort Sumter" (done by the 2nd NY Militia)
- Petersburg
- Rappahannock
- March 16, 1863
- August 7, 1863
- Portsmouth, Virginia
- Loudoun County
- Washington, D.C.
- Richmond
- Baltimore

==== Drawings ====
Of the drawings found, only two have been identified:

- Captain James Breathed
- The Maryland Scroll.

===== Other drawings =====
- 5 horses (one may be a mule)
- a male civilian in coat and tails
- an eagle/bird
- a fort
- a soldier in a slouch hat and mustache
- a soldier in a slouch hat and beard
- a young woman in a fancy dress, hat with ribbons, walking on a board or plank, saying "I am turned over to Lt. Gale"
- an older woman smoking a long pipe
- a young woman in a straw hat riding side-saddle
- a young woman wearing a scarf carrying a basket
- a bald man
- a pair of women in coats and hats, with their arms in a muffler, saying "I am turned over to Capt. Dillingham"
- a male civilian wearing a hat with a sword in his left hand. In the body of the man "President J. Davis good on the boots"
- a man in a bowler (or derby), with mutton chops, saying he "smells a rebel." He is facing the rear of a horse.
- a Federal soldier in a kepi

== Gallery ==
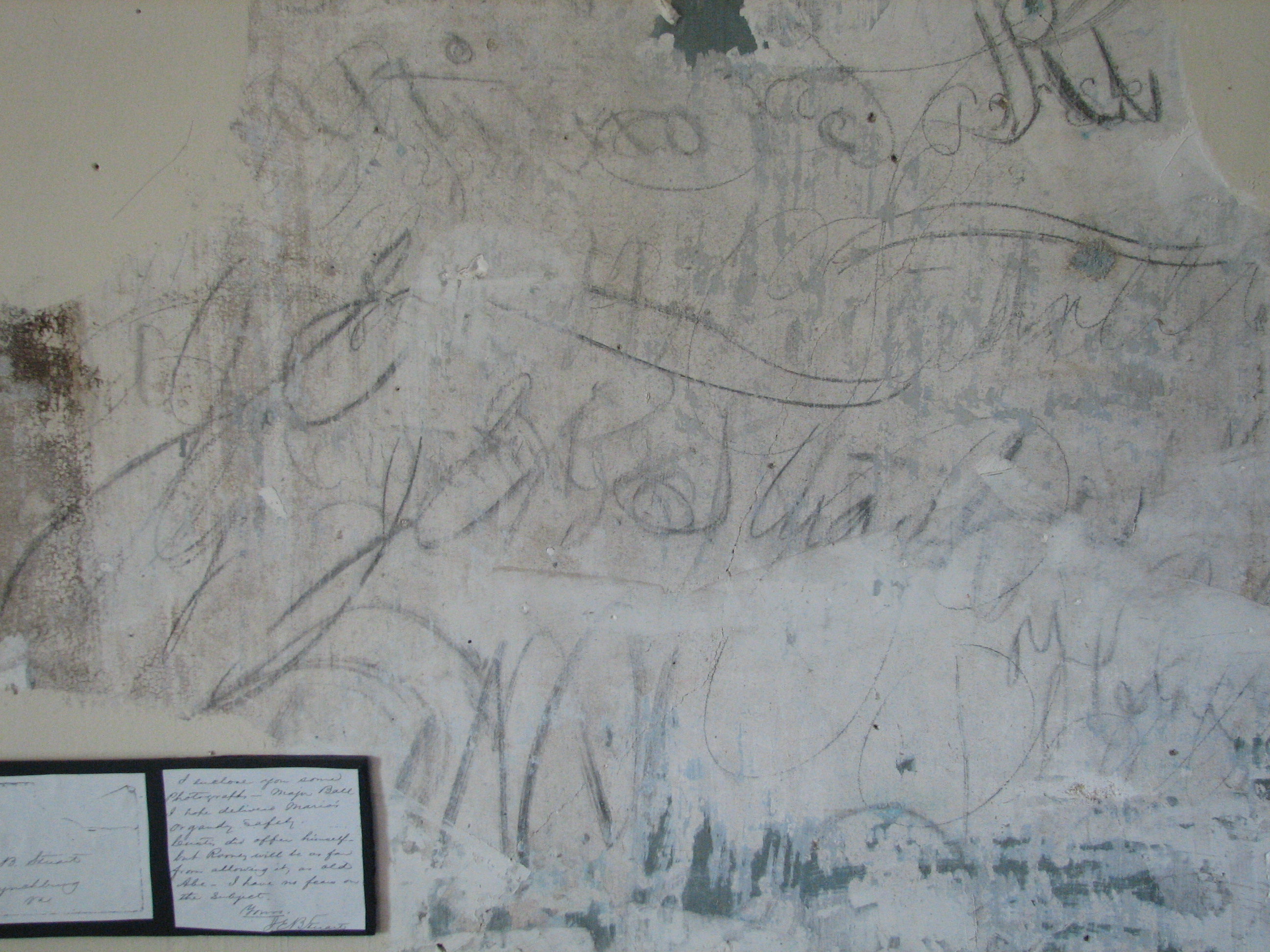
Jeb Stuart's signature

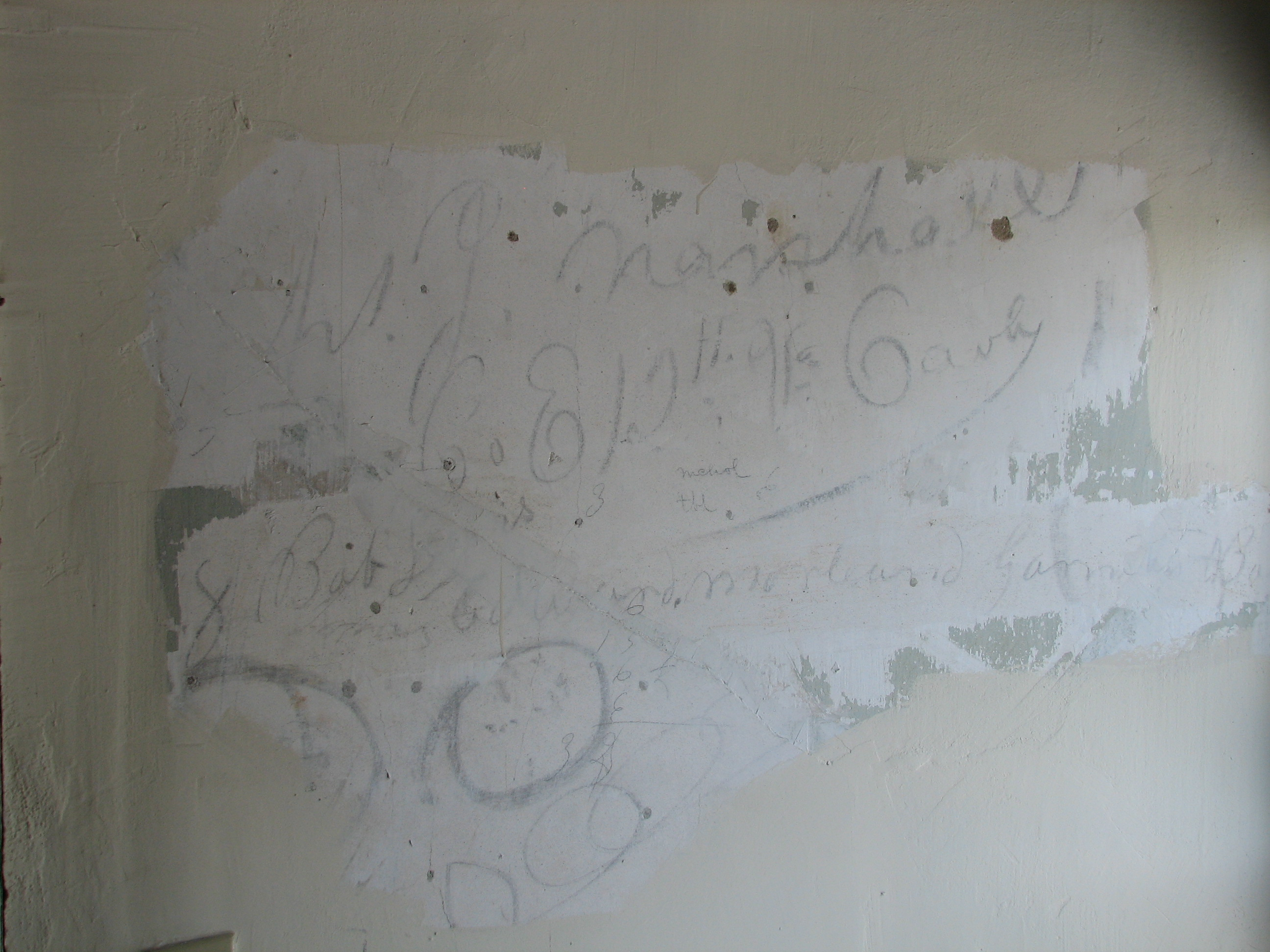
Lt. William J. Marshall's signature

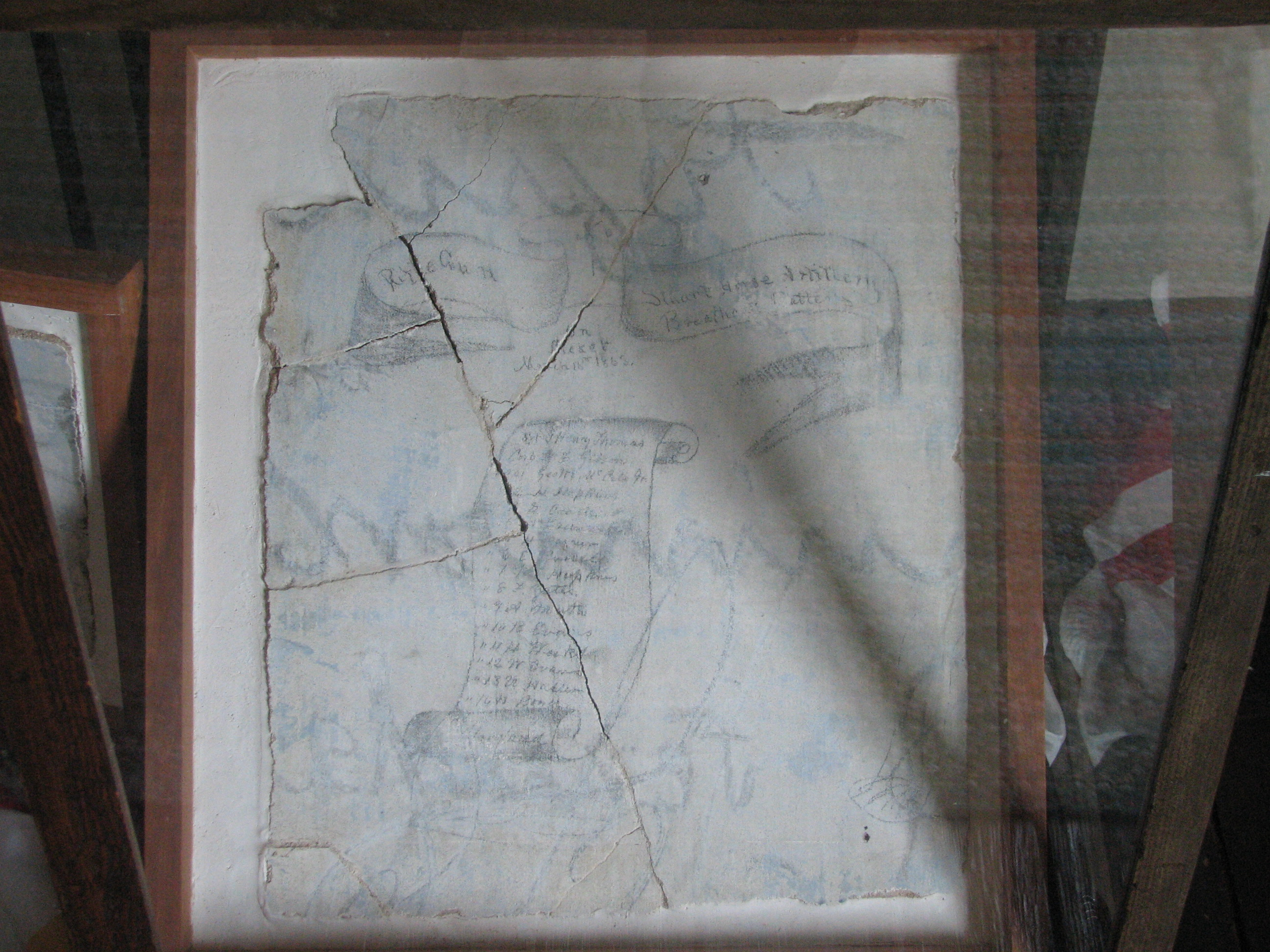
Maryland Scroll

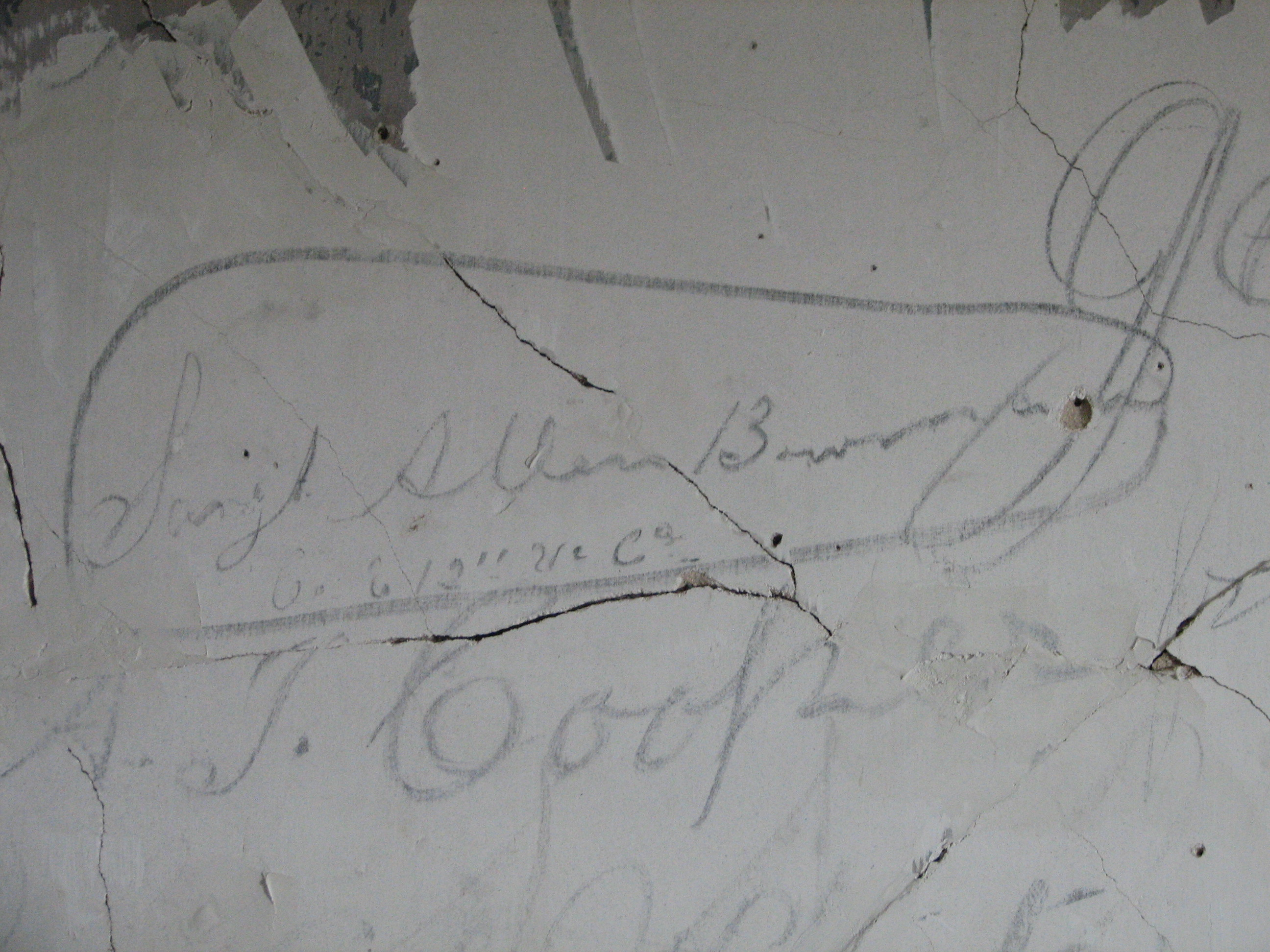
Sgt. Allen Bowman's signature

== See also ==
- List of Registered Historic Places in Virginia
