= Brandy Station, Virginia =

Unincorporated community in Virginia, United States

- Census-designated place
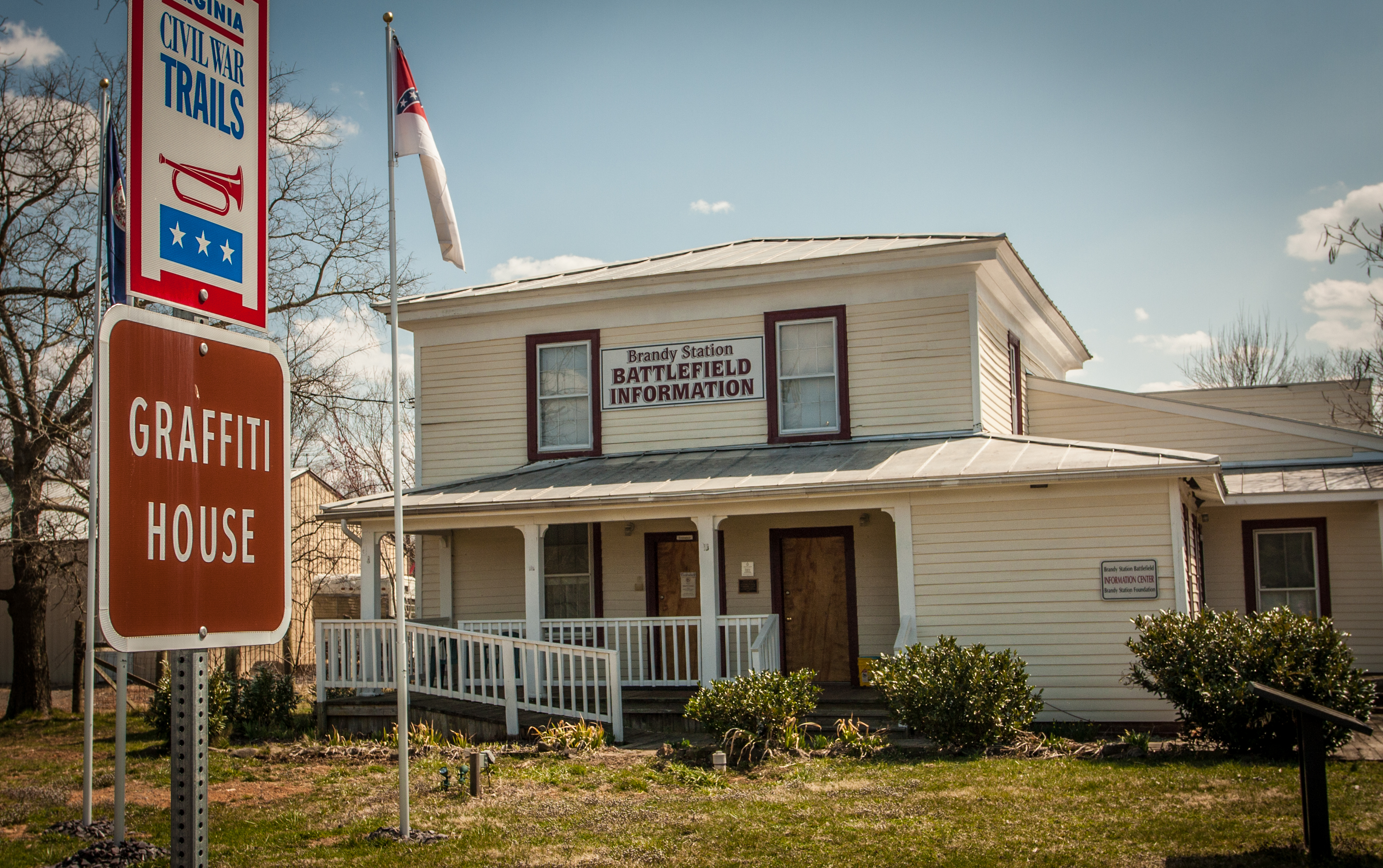
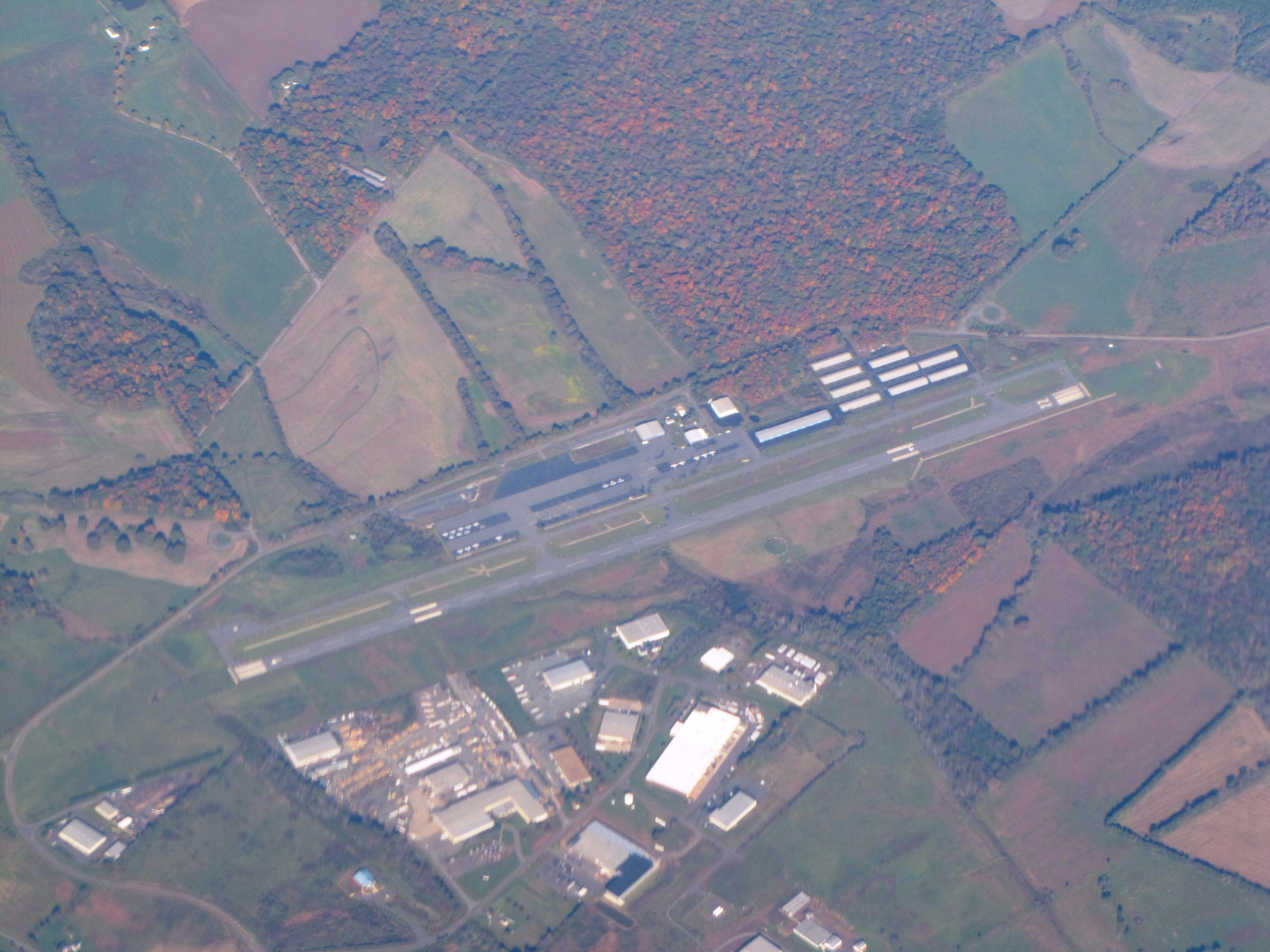
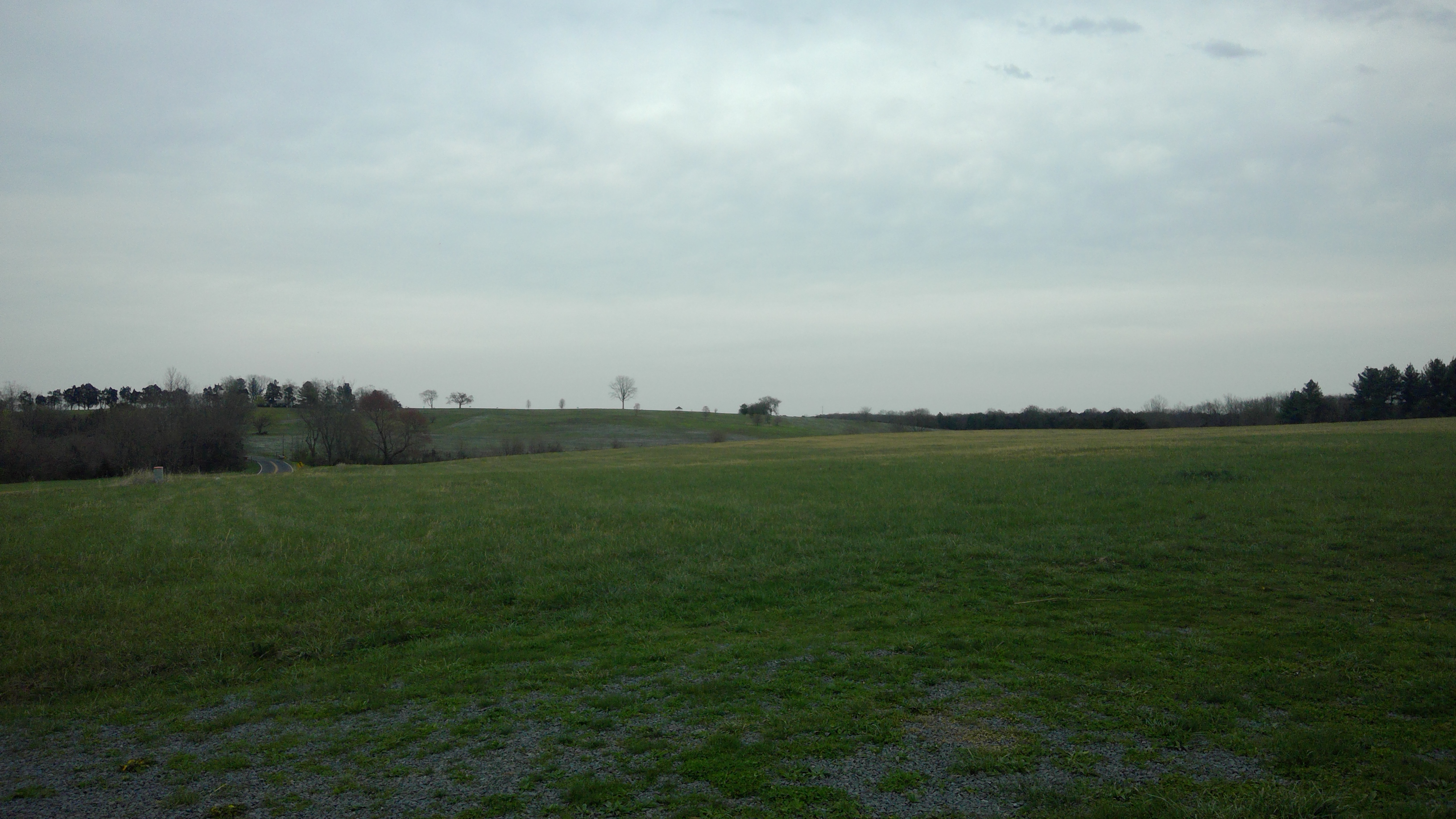
- Graffiti House Culpeper Regional Airport The site of the battle field, seen in 2017

- Location of the Brandy Station CDP within Culpeper County

- Location within the state of Virginia Brandy Station (the United States)
- Coordinates: 38°30′6″N 77°53′37″W
- Country: United States
- State: Virginia
- County: Culpeper

Population (2020)
  - Total: 191
- Time zone: UTC–5 (Eastern (EST))
  - Summer (DST): UTC–4 (EDT)

Brandy Station is an unincorporated community and census-designated place (CDP) in Culpeper County, Virginia, United States. It was first listed as a CDP in the 2020 United States census with a population of 191. The community’s name is traditionally traced to a tavern sign advertising brandy.

== History ==
=== Early development ===
The settlement began as a small crossroads in Culpeper County. Its position along transportation routes, especially after the completion of the Orange and Alexandria Railroad in the mid-19th century, gave it growing significance.

=== Civil War ===
On June 9, 1863, Brandy Station was the site of the Battle of Brandy Station, the largest predominantly cavalry engagement of the Civil War and the largest ever fought on American soil. More than 20,000 soldiers were involved, primarily cavalry supported by artillery and a small number of infantry. Union cavalry under Maj. Gen. Alfred Pleasonton attempted to dislodge Confederate forces under Maj. Gen. J. E. B. Stuart near Fleetwood Hill and St. James Church. The Confederates retained control of the ground, but the battle marked a turning point in the reputation and effectiveness of Union cavalry.

The area continued to play a role for the remainder of the war. During the winter of 1863–64, large portions of the Union Army of the Potomac encamped near Brandy Station. Several houses in the community, including what is now known as the Graffiti House, were used as hospitals and headquarters.

=== Postwar period and preservation ===
Following the Civil War, Brandy Station returned to being a rural farming community. In the late 20th century, proposals to redevelop parts of the battlefield prompted organized preservation efforts. The American Battlefield Trust, working with state and local partners, has preserved over 2,000 acres of battlefield land.

In 2024, the Commonwealth of Virginia established Culpeper Battlefields State Park, which incorporates lands at Brandy Station and nearby Cedar Mountain.

== Landmarks ==
- Graffiti House — built about 1858, the building contains preserved inscriptions and drawings left by Union and Confederate soldiers during the Civil War. It is operated today as a museum and visitor center by the Brandy Station Foundation.
- Battlefield areas — much of the surrounding countryside is preserved for historical interpretation, with walking tours and interpretive markers maintained by nonprofit and state agencies.
- Culpeper Regional Airport is located nearby on Beverly Ford Road, within the Brandy Station community.

== Demographics ==
As of the 2020 United States census, there were 191 people living in Brandy Station. The racial makeup of the CDP was 62.8% White, 18.3% Black or African American, 14.1% from other races, and 3.7% from two or more races. Hispanic or Latino of any race were 15.7% of the population.

Of the population, 29.8% were under the age of 18, 56.0% were between 18 and 64, and 14.1% were 65 years of age or older. The median age was 35.8 years.

According to the American Community Survey, the estimated per capita income was $33,881, and about 16.7% of residents were below the poverty line.

== See also ==
- Battle of Brandy Station
- Culpeper Battlefields State Park
- Graffiti House
