= Pleasonton =

Pleasonton may refer to:

- Stephen Pleasonton (c. 1776–1855), United States Treasury Dept. employee
- Augustus Pleasonton (1808–1894), Pennsylvania militia officer and chromotherapy proponent
- Alfred Pleasonton (1824–1897), United States Army officer

== See also ==
- Pleasanton, California, named for Alfred Pleasonton
- Pleasanton, Kansas, named for Alfred Pleasonton
- Pleasanton (disambiguation)
