= William H. Medill =

American Civil War officer (1835–1863)

William Henry Medill
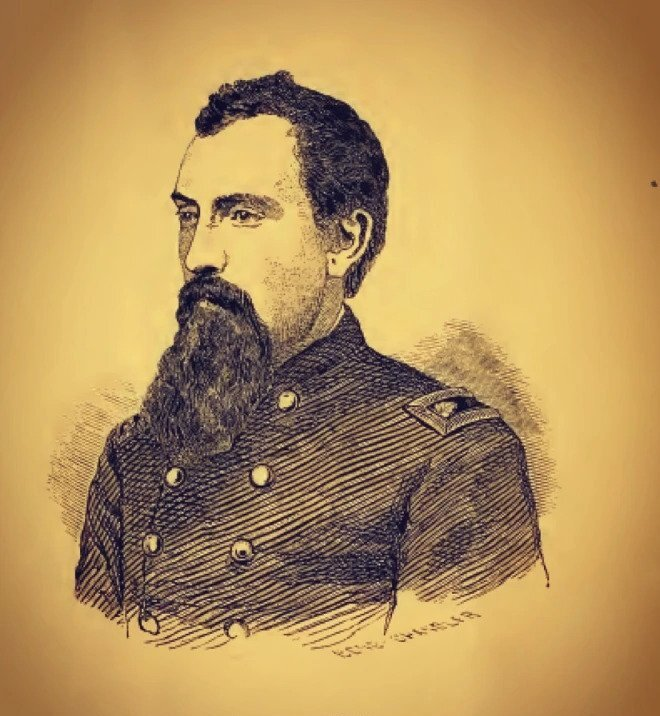
- Born: November 6, 1835; Massillon, Ohio, U.S.
- Died: July 16, 1863 (aged 27); Frederick, Maryland, U.S.
- Burial place: Graceland Cemetery, Chicago, Illinois
- Military career
- Allegiance: United States (Union)
- Branch: United States Army (Union Army)
- Service years: 1861–1863
- Rank: Major
- Commands: 8th Illinois Cavalry Regiment
- Conflicts: American Civil War: Western Virginia campaign; Battle of Philippi; Battle of Rich Mountain; Peninsula campaign; Battle of Malvern Hill; Maryland campaign; Battle of Crampton's Gap; Battle of Antietam; Chancellorsville campaign; Battle of Chancellorsville; Gettysburg campaign; Battle of Williamsport (DOW)
- Other work: Journalist

William Henry Medill was an American major and journalist who was a commander of the 8th Illinois Cavalry Regiment during the earlier battles of the American Civil War before dying from wounds after his wound Battle of Williamsport. He was also a compositor of the Chicago Tribune, which was edited by his brother, Joseph Medill.

== Biography ==
=== Journalism career ===
William was born on November 6, 1835. The family later moved to Cleveland where he managed to become an apprentice of his father and became a journalist when he was 15. William was successful in his career as he rose from compositor to foreman in 1852 of the Cleveland newspaper Leader. Around 1855, he moved to Chicago after his older brother Joseph Medill became the editor of the Chicago Tribune to become a compositor there until 1858.

=== American Civil War ===
Around the beginning of the American Civil War, Medill left his journalism career to pursue a military career as he recruited the Fremont Dragoons which would be later known as Barker's Dragoons. The Dragoons were sent to Camp Defiance where the regiment were given mounts as well as equipment. After some training there, Medill and the dragoons were sent to Clarksburg, Virginia to keep the border with Virginia and Ohio secure. He then participated in the First Battle of Bull Run as well as the Battle of Philippi but wouldn't see active combat. The first battle where Medill experienced actual combat was at the Battle of Rich Mountain as he fought in dismounted fighting and fired his first shots in anger using revolving carbines as he managed to capture his first prisoner from Georgia after a duel between them. After showing his achievements to his brother, an issue of the Chicago Tribune stated the Barker's Dragoons as "There, those are my Chicago boys."

Medill was a major critic of George B. McClellan's tactics and methods with the misuse of his men, stating:

Now is the time to strike vigorously at the secessionists. If I commanded this army, the pursuit would certainly be made. I like our General, but I think he is too cautious; he lacks boldness and enterprise.

With later events in the campaign no longer needing the escort of the dragoons, the Barker's Dragoons returned to Chicago on August 10, 1861, and were mustered out. Although Medill complained about his military service, he was also deeply patriotic and had an intense hatred for the Confederates. Due to his previous military experience, he was allowed to return to military service as commissioned captain of Company G of the 8th Illinois Cavalry Regiment. Medill and Company G were trained at Camp Kane near St. Charles, Illinois. However some citizens of St. Charles began to sell liquor at the camp to take advantage of the boredom of soldier life. This got so rampant and excessive that there was a potential illegal citizen-arrest conducted on the city by breaking in the houses of liquor distributors, confiscating the liquor and dumping it all in the streets.

When the time came for the 8th Illinois to head for D.C., they were greeted with the cheers of local citizens throughout their march. They also managed to pass by John F. Farnsworth's mansion and held "three rousing cheers" while they were at there with the morale of the 8th Illinois being very high. They then again saw active combat at the Battle of Malvern Hill throughout several skirmishes. He was then promoted to major on September 10, 1862. He would then go on to participate at the Battle of Crampton's Gap as well as the Battle of Antietam. After the battle, Medill would comment:

The retribution of justice is falling upon the south, and her people will soon be cast forth to the world to be despised and kicked from door to door.

Medill was also a known abolitionist, stating:

Even if the war terminates in favor of the Confederacy, and slavery is never abolished, I shall feel satisfied with myself and the part I put forward in the attempt made to put an end to the abominable institution.

The 8th Illinois would also go on to participate at the Battle of Chancellorsville however during the Battle of Williamsport, Medill was mortally wounded by gunshot during the battle with one his final words being:

I am going to die without knowing that my country is saved and the slaveholders’ accursed rebellion crushed. The capture of Lee's army would have ended the war in sixty days; now it may drag on for years.

Medill died at 10 A.M. on July 16, 1863, after being transferred to a hospital and was buried at Graceland Cemetery.
