= Pleasanton =

Pleasanton may refer to:

== Places ==
- Pleasanton, California, a city
- Pleasanton, Iowa, a city
- Pleasanton, Kansas, a city
- Pleasanton, Nebraska, a town
- Pleasanton, New Mexico, a census-designated place
- Pleasanton, Ohio, an unincorporated community
- Pleasanton, Texas, a city
- Pleasanton Township, Michigan, a township

== Other ==
- Pleasanton High School (disambiguation)

== See also ==
- Pleasonton (disambiguation)
