= Elon J. Farnsworth =

Union Army General (1837–1863)

Elon John Farnsworth
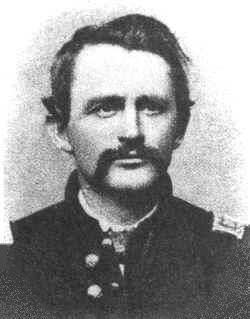
- Born: July 30, 1837; Green Oak, Michigan, U.S.
- Died: July 3, 1863 (aged 25); Gettysburg, Pennsylvania, U.S.
- Burial place: Rockton Cemetery, Rockton, Illinois
- Education: University of Michigan
- Military career
- Allegiance: United States of America; Union
- Branch: United States Army; Union Army
- Service years: 1861–1863
- Rank: Captain
- Commands: 8th Illinois Cavalry Regiment; 1st Brigade, 3rd Division, Cavalry Corps, Army of the Potomac
- Conflicts: Utah War; American Civil War; Battle of Chancellorsville; Battle of Gettysburg †

Elon John Farnsworth (July 30, 1837 – July 3, 1863) was a Union Army captain in the American Civil War. He commanded Brigade 1, Division 3 of the Cavalry Corps (Union Army) from June 28, 1863 to July 3, 1863, when he was mortally wounded and died at the Battle of Gettysburg. He was nominated by President Abraham Lincoln for appointment to the grade of brigadier general on June 29, 1863 but was not confirmed by the United States Senate before his death at Gettysburg.

== Early life and career ==
Farnsworth was born in Green Oak, Michigan on July 30, 1837.

Elon Farnsworth's uncle, John F. Farnsworth, served in the United States House of Representatives from Illinois between March 4, 1857 and March 3, 1861 and again between March 4, 1863 and March 3, 1873. John Farnsworth was a Union Army colonel who also commanded cavalry brigades (September 1862 to February 1863) and was nominated for appointed to the grade of brigadier general (November 1862). His appointment also was not confirmed by the United States Senate after the nomination was ordered returned to President Lincoln on February 12, 1863.

Elon Farnsworth's family moved to Illinois in 1854. A member of the Chi Psi Fraternity, Farnsworth was expelled from the University of Michigan following a drinking party in which a classmate died after being thrown from a window. He joined the Army as a civilian foragemaster in 1857 and served on the staff of Albert Sidney Johnston during the Utah War of 1857–58. He also worked as a buffalo hunter, scout and freighter in the Colorado Territory.

== Civil War ==
At the outbreak of the Civil War, Farnsworth was appointed a first lieutenant in the 8th Illinois Cavalry, the regiment commanded by his uncle, serving with distinction throughout the early stages of the war. Being promoted to captain on December 25, 1861, he was made Assistant Chief Quartermaster of the IV Corps, and in early 1863, he served as aide-de-camp to Brigadier General Alfred Pleasonton through the Battle of Chancellorsville and early stages of the Gettysburg campaign. Pleasonton, then in command of the Army of the Potomac's Cavalry Corps, gave Farnsworth command of 1st Brigade, 3rd Division, Cavalry Corps, Army of the Potomac on June 28, 1863, three days before the Battle of Gettysburg. On June 29, 1863, just two days before the battle, President Lincoln nominated Farnsworth to the grade brigadier general of volunteers but the appointment was never confirmed by the United States Senate.

=== Death at Gettysburg ===
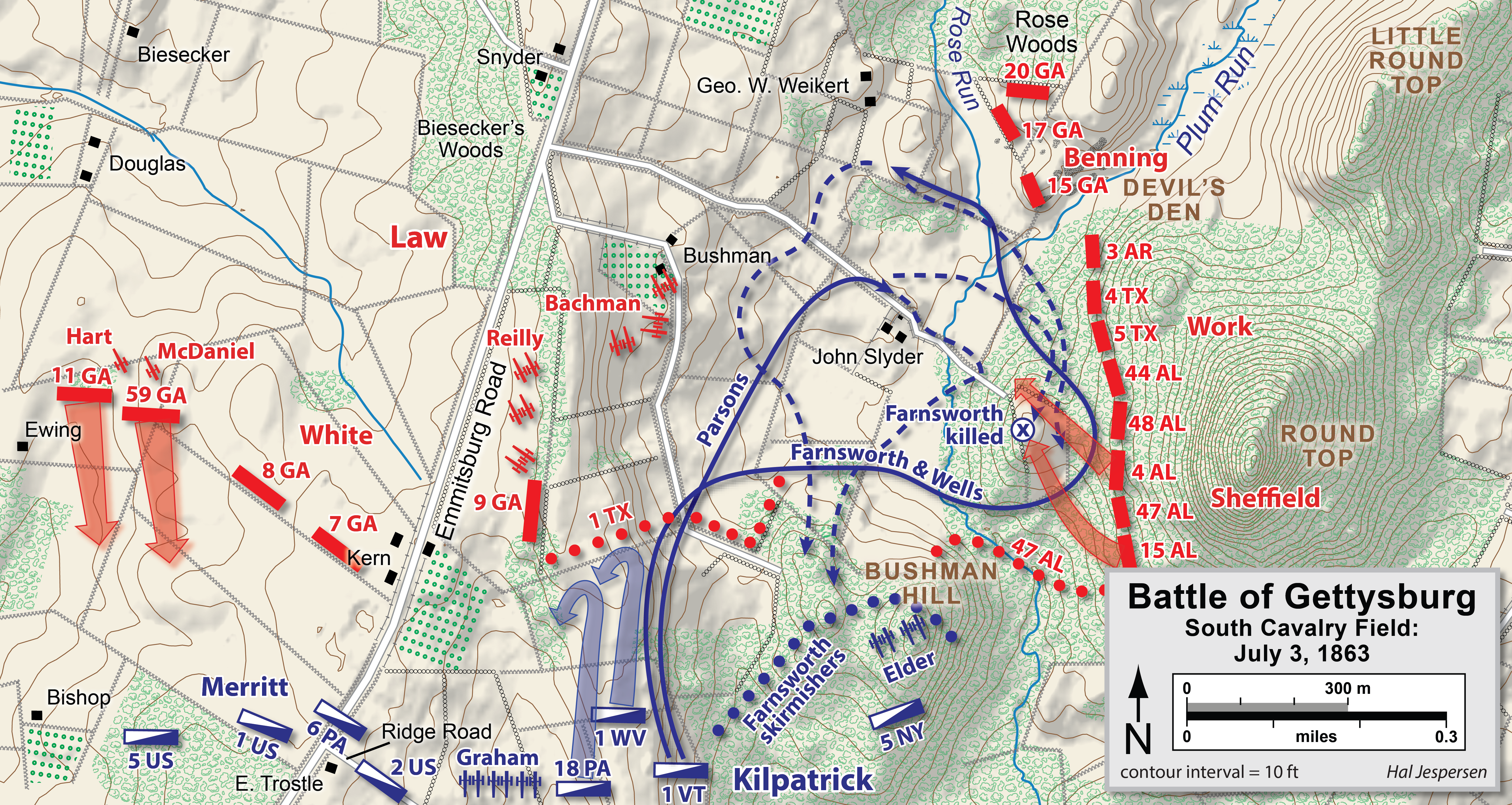
South Cavalry Field at Gettysburg Confederate Union

After the collapse of Pickett's Charge and the defeat of Major General J.E.B. Stuart's Confederate cavalry on July 3, the third day of the Battle of Gettysburg, Brigadier General Hugh Judson Kilpatrick, commanding the 3rd Division, ordered Farnsworth to make a charge with his brigade against Confederate positions south of the Devil's Den area of the battlefield, below Little Round Top. Farnsworth initially balked, arguing there was no hope of success, and only agreed to it when Kilpatrick allegedly accused him of cowardice. Farnsworth made the charge, against elements of John B. Hood's division, under Evander M. Law (Hood having been wounded the previous day). Farnsworth rode with the second battalion of the 1st Vermont Cavalry, alongside Major William Wells.

The charge was repulsed with heavy losses, and Farnsworth himself was shot five times in the chest. An account by Confederate Colonel William C. Oates claimed that Farnsworth was surrounded by Confederate soldiers and committed suicide to avoid capture, but this has been disputed by other witnesses and discounted by most historians. Kilpatrick received much criticism for ordering the charge, but no official action was taken against him.

Farnsworth is buried in Rockton Cemetery, Rockton, Illinois.

== Memorials ==
Battery Farnsworth, a coastal defense built between 1897 and 1899 near Fort Constitution at New Castle, New Hampshire, was named in his honor.
