= KPIO-FM =

- Pleasanton, Kansas; United States
- Frequency: 93.7 MHz

Programming
- Format: Religious broadcasting

Ownership
- Owner: Catholic Radio Network

History
- First air date: 1972

Technical information
- Licensing authority: FCC
- Facility ID: 165947
- Class: C3
- ERP: 25,000 watts
- HAAT: 100.0 meters (328.1 ft)
- Transmitter coordinates: 38°14′23.00″N 94°56′36.00″W

Links
- Public license information: Public file; LMS

KPIO-FM (93.7 FM) is a radio station broadcasting a religious broadcasting music format. Licensed to Pleasanton, Kansas, United States. The station is currently owned by Catholic Radio Network.
