= Pleasanton, Kansas =

- City
- Location within Linn County and Kansas

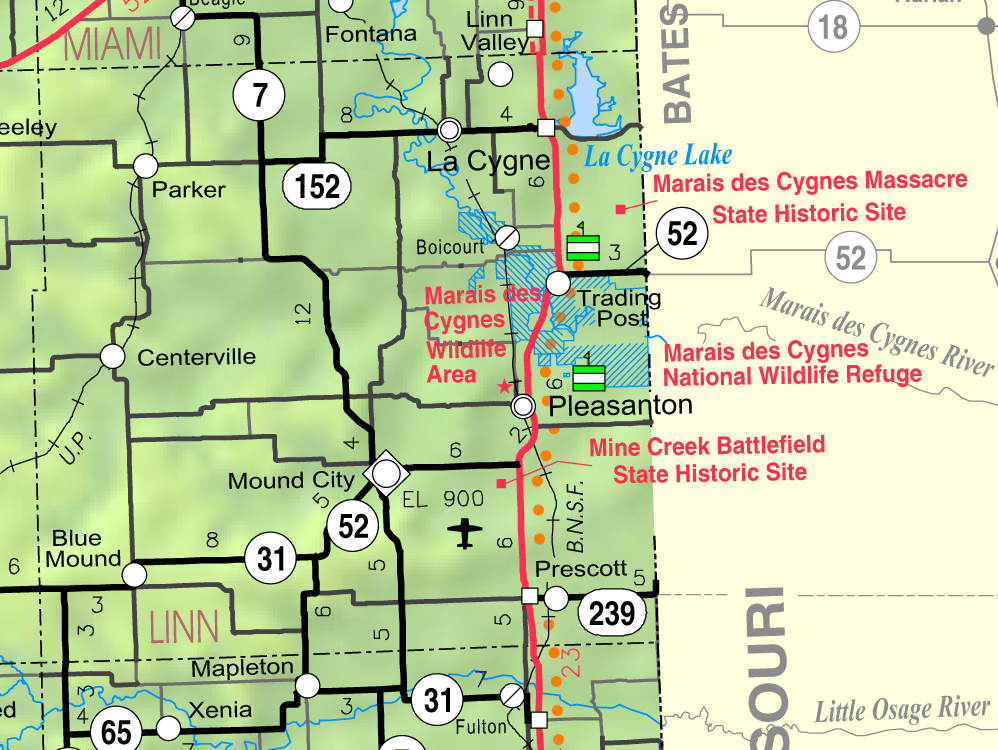
- KDOT map of Linn County (legend)
- Coordinates: 38°10′44″N 94°42′19″W
- Country: United States
- State: Kansas
- County: Linn
- Founded: 1869 (157 years ago)
- Incorporated: 1878 (148 years ago)
- Named for: General Alfred Pleasonton

Government
  - Type: Mayor–Council-Manager

Area
  - Total: 2.34 sq mi (6.05 km^{2})
  - Land: 2.08 sq mi (5.39 km^{2})
  - Water: 0.25 sq mi (0.66 km^{2})
- Elevation: 850 ft (260 m)

Population (2020)
  - Total: 1,208
  - Density: 580/sq mi (224/km^{2})
- Time zone: UTC-6 (CST)
  - Summer (DST): UTC-5 (CDT)
- ZIP Code: 66075
- Area code: 913
- FIPS code: 20-56450
- GNIS ID: 2396236
- Website: pleasantonks.com

Pleasanton is a city in Linn County, Kansas, United States. As of the 2020 census, the population of the city was 1,208.

== History ==
In 1864, General Alfred Pleasonton defeated the Confederates in the Battle of Mine Creek near present-day Pleasanton. This battle, involving 25,000 men, resulted in a Union victory which ended the threat of Confederate invasion in Kansas.

Pleasanton had its start in the year 1869 by the building of the Kansas City, Fort Scott & Memphis Railroad through that territory. It was named in honor of General Alfred Pleasonton, though the city name is spelled differently.

The first post office in Pleasanton was established in August 1869.

Pleasanton's first church, namely the Fairmount Church, was constructed in 1884. On April 27, 2014 the church was destroyed by an EF2 tornado which also severely damaged the town's cemetery.

From the 1950s to 1985, Pleasanton was home of Fundcraft, a publisher that specialized in printing fundraiser cookbooks for churches, synagogues, and civic associations across the country. While many of these community cookbooks have proven to be ephemeral, some have made their way into research libraries as evidence of American popular food culture.

== Geography ==
According to the United States Census Bureau, the city has a total area of 2.05 square miles (5.31 km^{2}), of which 1.80 square miles (4.66 km^{2}) is land and 0.25 square miles (0.65 km^{2}) is water.

Pleasanton is approximately 67 miles (108 km) south of Kansas City, Kansas.

=== Climate ===
The climate in this area is characterized by hot, humid summers and generally mild to cool winters. According to the Köppen Climate Classification system, Pleasanton has a humid subtropical climate, abbreviated "Cfa" on climate maps.

== Demographics ==
Historical population
Census	Pop.	Note	%±
1880	709		—
1890	1,139		60.6%
1900	1,097		−3.7%
1910	1,373		25.2%
1920	1,291		−6.0%
1930	1,214		−6.0%
1940	1,227		1.1%
1950	1,178		−4.0%
1960	1,098		−6.8%
1970	1,216		10.7%
1980	1,303		7.2%
1990	1,231		−5.5%
2000	1,387		12.7%
2010	1,216		−12.3%
2020	1,208		−0.7%
U.S. Decennial Census

=== 2020 census ===
The 2020 United States census counted 1,208 people, 489 households, and 287 families in Pleasanton. The population density was 579.9 per square mile (223.9/km^{2}). There were 567 housing units at an average density of 272.2 per square mile (105.1/km^{2}). The racial makeup was 92.47% (1,117) white or European American (90.98% non-Hispanic white), 0.33% (4) black or African-American, 0.33% (4) Native American or Alaska Native, 0.0% (0) Asian, 0.0% (0) Pacific Islander or Native Hawaiian, 0.25% (3) from other races, and 6.62% (80) from two or more races. Hispanic or Latino of any race was 2.4% (29) of the population.

Of the 489 households, 31.3% had children under the age of 18; 41.5% were married couples living together; 30.7% had a female householder with no spouse or partner present. 35.0% of households consisted of individuals and 18.0% had someone living alone who was 65 years of age or older. The average household size was 2.2 and the average family size was 2.8. The percent of those with a bachelor's degree or higher was estimated to be 13.8% of the population.

27.4% of the population was under the age of 18, 8.5% from 18 to 24, 21.7% from 25 to 44, 24.2% from 45 to 64, and 18.2% who were 65 years of age or older. The median age was 38.7 years. For every 100 females, there were 107.6 males. For every 100 females ages 18 and older, there were 113.4 males.

The 2016–2020 five-year American Community Survey estimates show that the median household income was $41,615 (with a margin of error of +/- $8,868) and the median family income was $62,768 (+/- $7,680). Males had a median income of $32,560 (+/- $5,008) versus $25,809 (+/- $6,030) for females. The median income for those above 16 years old was $30,038 (+/- $4,904). Approximately, 8.0% of families and 16.9% of the population were below the poverty line, including 10.0% of those under the age of 18 and 37.3% of those ages 65 or over.

=== 2010 census ===
As of the census of 2010, there were 1,216 people, 528 households, and 324 families residing in the city. The population density was 675.6 inhabitants per square mile (260.9/km^{2}). There were 607 housing units at an average density of 337.2 per square mile (130.2/km^{2}). The racial makeup of the city was 95.0% White, 0.7% African American, 0.4% Native American, 0.5% Asian, 0.2% Pacific Islander, 1.3% from other races, and 2.0% from two or more races. Hispanic or Latino of any race were 2.9% of the population.

There were 528 households, of which 30.9% had children under the age of 18 living with them, 43.0% were married couples living together, 13.6% had a female householder with no husband present, 4.7% had a male householder with no wife present, and 38.6% were non-families. 34.8% of all households were made up of individuals, and 20.3% had someone living alone who was 65 years of age or older. The average household size was 2.30 and the average family size was 2.97.

The median age in the city was 38 years. 26.6% of residents were under the age of 18; 8.1% were between the ages of 18 and 24; 23.7% were from 25 to 44; 24.1% were from 45 to 64; and 17.5% were 65 years of age or older. The gender makeup of the city was 45.1% male and 54.9% female.

== Education ==
The community is served by Pleasanton USD 344 public school district.

- Pleasanton High School, mascot the "Blu-Jays".
- Pleasanton Public Library

== Museums ==
- Pleasanton Antique Car Museum
- Linn County Museum
- Carpenter's Ol' Iron Motorcycle Museum

== Media ==
- KPIO-FM 93.7 – religious broadcasting
- Linn County News (linncountynews.net)
- Local television stations that serve the Linn County, Kansas, area include KCTV 5 (CBS), KSHB 41 (NBC), KMBC-TV (ABC), WDAF-TV (Fox), The Four States Network, and KTWU-Topeka (PBS).

== Notable people ==
- Carl Hall – executed for kidnapping and murder in the 1953 kidnapping of Bobby Greenlease
- Julius Holmes – Assistant Secretary of State; United States Ambassador to Iran
- Stephen R. Johnson – music video director; graduated from Pleasanton High School
- Burt McKinnie – golfer; competed in 1904 Summer Olympics

== See also ==
- Potosi's post
- Camp Defiance
