= Colorpuncture =

Pseudoscientific alternative medicine practice

Alternative medicine
- Color light acupuncture
- Claims: Applying colored light to meridian points on the body, derived from acupuncture, has beneficial health effects.
- Related fields: Acupressure, Acupuncture, Biophotonics, Iridology, Kirlian photography
- Year proposed: 1970s
- Original proponents: Peter Mandel
- See also: Chromotherapy

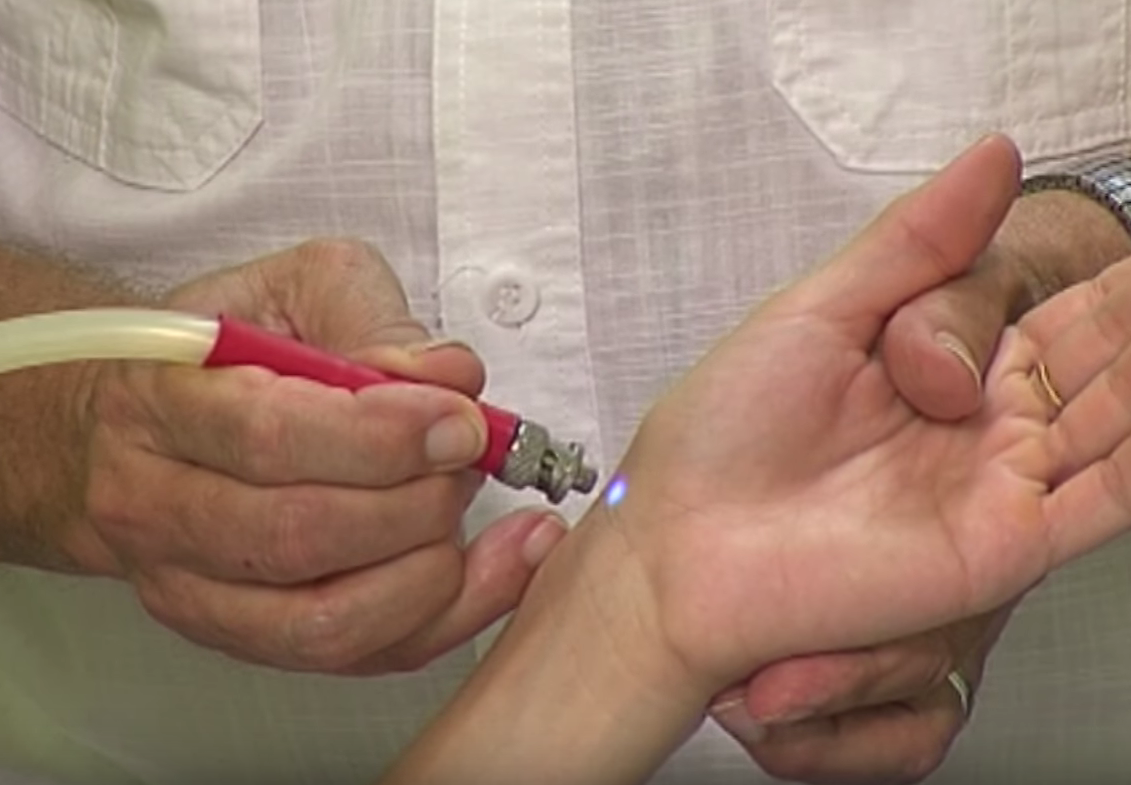
Application of blue light in the acupuncture's "60th point of the lung channel" during a colorpuncture session

Colorpuncture, cromopuncture, or color light acupuncture, is a pseudoscientific alternative medicine practice based on "mystical or supernatural" beliefs which asserts that colored lights can be used to stimulate acupuncture points to promote healing and better health. It is a form of chromotherapy or color therapy. There is no known anatomical or histological basis for the existence of acupuncture points or meridians, and there is no scientific support for the efficacy of colorpuncture.

== Background ==
Colorpuncture was developed in the 1980s by German naturopath and acupuncturist Peter Mandel, who named it esogetic colorpuncture. "Esogetic" is a term coined by Mandel to refer to the "merger of esoteric wisdom of life with the energetic principles of life's processes".

Mandel cited Fritz-Albert Popp, who claimed that the body's cells communicate with each other through a steady stream of photons. This is not a scientifically recognized method of cell communication. Using Kirlian photography, Mandel concluded that the acupuncture meridians absorb and disseminate colored light within the body.

Colorpuncture is based on the idea that illness and pain occur when an individual has strayed off his or her "life path". For example, a treatment might be intended to release an emotional blockage to heal a nervous system condition, allowing patients to devote themselves to their individual spiritual purpose. Three of the six factors (called molecules) represent the subtle energies: the chakras, the formative field, and the converter model. The other three factors describe the physical reality: the body systems, the coordination system, and the transmitter relays.

== Treatment ==
Colorpuncture employs seven basic colors. In general, the warm colors - red, orange, and yellow - are believed to add energy, while the cool colors - green, blue, and violet - decrease energy. Mandel also claims that warm and cool colors, when used together, balance yin and yang energy flows.

A small handheld instrument resembling a torch (flashlight) with a colored quartz rod is used. The tip is placed directly onto acupoints or held a short distance above. Unlike acupuncture, the skin is not broken. Colorpuncture sessions last 10 to 90 minutes. Colorpuncturists claim to diagnose through the use of Kirlian photography.

== Reception ==
Jack Raso writing in the Skeptical Inquirer included colorpuncture in a list of "mystical or supernaturalistic" therapies. Harriet Hall points out there is no supporting research for colorpuncture and explains how color can be used for diagnosis rather than treatment.

A review of research studies conducted in Europe to evaluate the efficacy of colorpuncture concluded that the approach lacked a research base to be considered anything but a pilot or preliminary research stage. Quackwatch lists it as a questionable treatment, and research on colorpuncture has failed to demonstrate a consistent effect.

The Spanish Government's health reference has ruled it a "pseudotherapy."

== See also ==
- Chromotherapy
- Pseudoscience
- List of topics characterized as pseudoscience
