= 8th Illinois Cavalry Regiment =

- Illinois flag
- Active: September 18, 1861, to July 17, 1865
- Country: United States
- Allegiance: Union
- Branch: Cavalry
- Engagements: Battle of Williamsburg; Battle of Fair Oaks; Battle of Antietam; Battle of Fredericksburg; Stoneman's Raid; Battle of Brandy Station; Battle of Gettysburg; Battle of Monocacy; Battle of Opequon; Battle of Fort Stevens

The 8th Illinois Cavalry Regiment was a cavalry regiment that served in the Union Army during the American Civil War. The regiment served the duration of the war, and was the only Illinois cavalry regiment to serve the entire war in the Army of the Potomac. They also aided in the hunt for John Wilkes Booth and served as President Lincoln's honor guard while he lay in state under the rotunda. Lincoln gave them the nickname of "Farnsworth's Abolitionist Regiment" when he watched them march past the White House.

== Service ==
The regiment was commissioned on August 11, 1861, and was assembled for service in St. Charles, Illinois, on September 18, 1861, at the site donated by Colonel Farnsworth called Camp Kane. They were sent out on July 17, 1865, in Chicago, Illinois.

=== Battle of Gettysburg ===
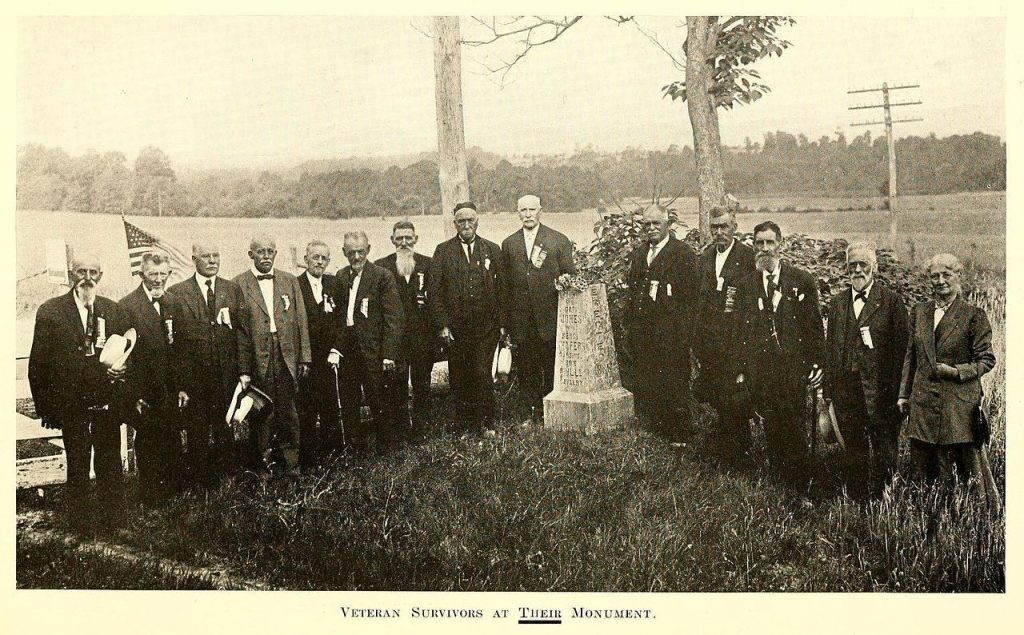
Veterans of the 8th Illinois Cavalry, Gettysburg 50th anniversary reunion, July 1913

During the Gettysburg campaign, the 8th Illinois Cavalry was in the division of Brig. Gen. John Buford. They deployed west of Gettysburg on June 30, 1863, under the command of Colonel William Gamble, and waited for oncoming Confederates that arrived early the following morning. The first shot of the subsequent battle was fired by Lieutenant Marcellus E. Jones of Company E, who borrowed a carbine from Sergeant Levi Shafer and fired at an unidentified officer on a gray horse over a half-mile away. The 8th, along with the rest of the brigade, performed a fighting withdrawal toward McPherson's Ridge, delaying the Confederate division of Henry Heth for several hours and allowing the Union I Corps to arrive.

Two decades after the war ended, veterans of the regiment dedicated a monument to the 8th Illinois along the crest of McPherson's Ridge. Jones also erected a monument in recognition of the first shot he fired on the location of the shot next to the Whistler's home just east of Marsh Creek on the Chambersburg Pike. The stone was quarried from Naperville limestone; Naperville was the hometown of Levi Shafer, whose carbine Jones borrowed.

=== Total strength and casualties ===
The regiment suffered a total of 250 fatalities; seven officers and 68 enlisted men killed in action or died of their wounds and one officer and 174 enlisted men died of disease.

== Commanders ==
- Colonel John F. Farnsworth - promoted brigadier general on December 5, 1862.
- Colonel William Gamble - mustered out with the regiment.
- Lieutenant Colonel David Ramsay Clendenin - commanded at various times during the war, eventually Bvt. Brig. Gen. USV and Col. USA
- Major John Lourie Beveridge - commanded at Gettysburg, then promoted to colonel and commander of the 17th Illinois Cavalry in November 1863 was Governor of Illinois, 1873-1877.
- Major William H. Medill - commanded at Antietam and Williamsport before dying from wounds in the latter.

== Other notables ==
- Sergeant Horace Capron, Jr. - Medal of Honor recipient; son of Horace Capron
- First Lieutenant Elon J. Farnsworth - promoted in June 1863 to brigadier general as assigned to a brigade command; killed in the Battle of Gettysburg. Nephew of Colonel Farnsworth.
- Captain George Alexander Forsyth, later a famed Indian fighter in the Old West.
- Lieutenant Marcellus Jones, would go on to remove the Dupage County records from Naperville, Illinois and take them to Wheaton, Illinois, where the present county seat is located.
- Private Henry Laycock - later a member of the Wisconsin State Assembly.

== See also ==
- List of Illinois Civil War Units
- Illinois in the American Civil War
