= Pleasanton High School =

Pleasanton High School may refer to:

- Pleasanton High School (Nebraska), a public high school located in Pleasanton, Nebraska
- Pleasanton High School (Pleasanton, Texas), a public high school located in Pleasanton, Texas, U.S.

== See also ==
- Pleasanton (disambiguation)
