= Marcellus Jones =

Union Army soldier in the American Civil War

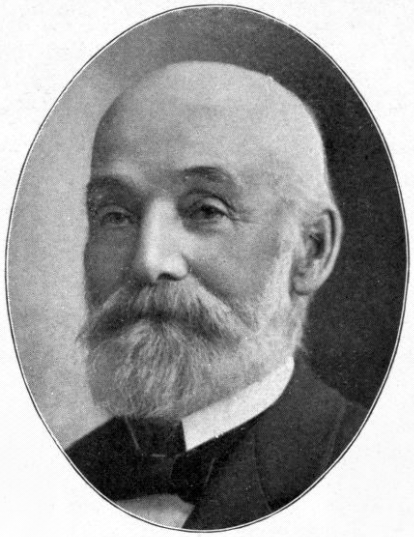
Marcellus Jones

Marcellus Ephraim Jones (June 5, 1830 – October 9, 1900) is reported as being the soldier who fired the first shot at the Battle of Gettysburg (1863).

== Early life ==
Jones was born in Poultney, Vermont, a son of Ephraim and Sophia (Page) Jones. In 1858, Jones moved to DuPage County, Illinois. He lived in Danby (now Glen Ellyn, Illinois), until the American Civil War when Abraham Lincoln called for volunteers.

== Civil War ==
Jones enlisted in Company E of the 8th Illinois Cavalry on August 5, 1861. He was commissioned a second lieutenant on December 5, 1862, first lieutenant July 4, 1864, and captain on October 10, 1864. All three commissions were signed by Illinois Governor Richard Yates.

On July 1, 1863, at Gettysburg, Jones commanded one of the regiment's sentry posts on the Chambersburg Pike, the road Robert E. Lee's Confederate army used to march from Cashtown to Gettysburg. About 7:30 a.m., Jones noticed a cloud of dust on the road to the west, indicating that the Confederates were approaching. At that point, Jones borrowed Corporal Levi S. Shafer's carbine, aimed it with the assistance of a fence rail, and fired a shot at "an officer on a white or light gray horse."

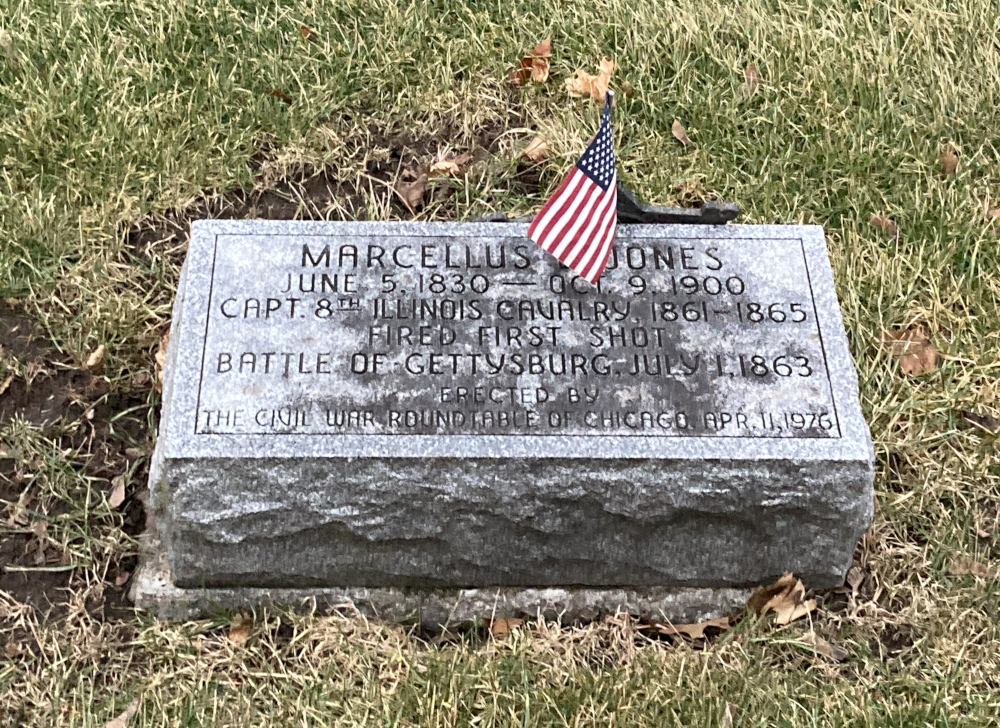
Jones' grave at Wheaton Cemetery

== Post-war life and death ==
Jones settled in Wheaton, Illinois, after the war and was active in local politics, including serving as DuPage County sheriff and Wheaton postmaster. His home, which originally stood at 504 Naperville Road, was moved a few blocks away in 1977 and still stands today at 221 East Illinois, where it serves as offices for a law firm.

Jones was also active in erecting a memorial at the location where he fired the first shot of the Battle of Gettysburg. He was present in Gettysburg in 1886 for the dedication of the memorial, which is composed of DuPage County limestone and still stands today on the north side of U.S. Route 30 (Chambersburg Pike) at its intersection with Knoxlyn Road.

Jones died in Wheaton on October 9, 1900, and was buried at Wheaton Cemetery. His gravesite was left unmarked after he died, as his wife did not have enough money for a headstone. On April 11, 1976, the Civil War Round Table of Chicago installed a headstone at his grave.
