= Chromotherapy =

Alternative medicine method also known as color therapy

Alternative medicine
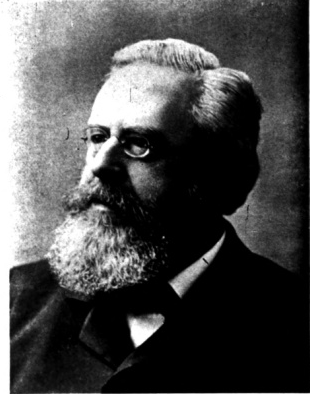
- Edwin Dwight Babbitt, an early proponent of Chromotherapy
- Claims: Colored light can balance "energy" in a human body.
- Year proposed: 1876
- Original proponents: Augustus Pleasonton
- Subsequent proponents: Seth Pancoast, Edwin Dwight Babbitt

Chromotherapy, sometimes called color therapy, colorology or cromatherapy, is a pseudoscientific form of alternative medicine which proposes certain diseases can be treated by exposure to certain colors. Its practice is considered to be quackery. Chromotherapists claim to be able to use light in the form of color to balance "energy" lacking from a person's body, whether it be on physical, emotional, spiritual, or mental levels. For example, they thought that shining a colored light on a person would cure constipation. Historically, chromotherapy has been associated with mysticism and occultism.

Color therapy is unrelated to photomedicine, such as phototherapy and blood irradiation therapy, which are scientifically accepted medical treatments for a number of conditions, as well as being unrelated to photobiology, which is the scientific study of the effects of light on living organisms.

== History ==
Avicenna (980–1037), seeing color as of vital importance both in diagnosis and in treatment, discussed chromotherapy in The Canon of Medicine. He wrote that "color is an observable symptom of disease" and also developed a chart that related color to the temperature and physical condition of the body. His view was that red moved the blood, blue or white cooled it, and yellow reduced muscular pain and inflammation.

Pioneer of photography Robert Hunt performed experiments on the effects of different wavelengths of light on the germination and growth of plants, detailed in his 1844 book Researches on Light. Apparently influenced by this work, from 1860 Augustus Pleasonton started to conduct original experiments, and in 1876 published the book The Influence of the Blue Ray of the Sunlight and of the Blue Color of the Sky, detailing how the color blue can improve the growth of crops and livestock and can help heal diseases in humans. This led to the birth of modern chromotherapy, influencing contemporary scientists Dr. Seth Pancoast and Edwin Dwight Babbitt to conduct experiments and publish Blue and Red Light; or, Light and Its Rays as Medicine (1877) and The Principles of Light and Color (1878), respectively.

Pancoast's book has been described by historians as a confusing mix of color therapy, mysticism, and occultism. He held a lifelong interest in the Kabbalah and was a founding member of the Theosophical Society. Pancoast believed that God is light and "the one universal pathological agent" that could cure disease. He would expose medications to colored light before administering them to a patient and also utilized sun-baths fitted with colored panes of glass. Throughout the 19th century, "color healers" claimed colored glass filters could treat many diseases, including constipation and meningitis. In Germany in the late 1890s, Georg von Langsdorff promoted Babbitt's ideas and mixed color therapy with psychometry and spiritualism.

The Buddhist monk Bhante Dharmawara was a notable advocate of color therapy who promoted the use of green, blue, and yellow for health. Other notable advocates include Anthroposophist Theo Gimbel, who authored many books on the subject and founded the Hygeia Institute for Colour Therapy in 1968.

=== Dinshah P. Ghadiali ===
In 1933, Indian scientist Dinshah P. Ghadiali published The Spectro Chromemetry Encyclopaedia, a work on color therapy. Ghadiali claimed to have discovered why and how the different colored rays have various therapeutic effects on organisms. He believed that colors represent chemical potencies in higher octaves of vibration, and for each organism and system of the body, there is a particular color that stimulates and another that inhibits the work of that organ or system. He also thought that, by knowing the action of the different colors upon the different organs and systems of the body, one can apply the correct color that will tend to balance the action of any organ or system that has become abnormal in its function or condition. The American Medical Association published refutations of Ghadiali's color therapy claims. In 1958, the Food and Drug Administration (FDA) facilitated a permanent injunction against Ghadiali's Visible Spectrum Research Institute.

Ghadiali's son, Darius Dinshah, and grandson Ryan, continue to provide information about color therapy via his Dinshah Health Society, a nonprofit organization dedicated to advancing non-pharmaceutical home color therapy, and his book Let There Be Light.

== Conceptual basis ==
A New Age conceptualisation of the chakras of Indian body culture and their positions in the human body

Practitioners of ayurvedic medicine believe the body has seven "chakras", which some claim are 'spiritual centers', and are thought to be located along the spine. New Age thought associates each of the chakras with a single color of the visible light spectrum, along with a function and organ or bodily system. According to this view, the chakras can become imbalanced and result in physical and mental diseases, but application of the appropriate color can allegedly correct such imbalances.

== Scientific rejection ==
Chromotherapy is a popular pseudoscience. Its practice is regarded by health experts and historians as a form of quackery.

According to a book published by the American Cancer Society, "available scientific evidence does not support claims that alternative uses of light or color therapy are effective in treating cancer or other illnesses". Regarding Dinshah Ghadiali's work, science writer Martin Gardner had described him as "perhaps the greatest quack of them all". According to Gardner, photographs of Ghadiali at work in his laboratory are "indistinguishable from stills of a grade D movie about a mad scientist".

Historian Deborah Ascher Barnstone has noted that chromotherapy is "distinct from scientifically verified light treatments such as neonatal jaundice treatment. As, unlike chromotherapy, the light used in such therapies, whether scientifically proven or not, was not always colored, their particulars are not relevant in this context."

Photobiology, the term for the scientific study of the effects of light on living tissue, has sometimes been used instead of the term chromotherapy in an effort to distance it from its roots in Victorian mysticism and to strip it of its associations with symbolism and magic. Light therapy is a specific treatment approach using high intensity light to treat specific sleep, skin, and mood disorders.

A review of the existing research on chromotherapy found that there is no evidence to support a causal link between specific colors to health outcomes, there is not enough evidence to support a causal link between specific colors and emotional or mental states, and there is no research to suggest there exists one-to-one relationships between specific colors and emotions.

Chromotherapy has been accused of oversimplifying psychological responses to colors, making sweeping statements based on myths or beliefs that lack empirical support. Guidelines for chromotherapy lack consistency and appear to be subjective judgements that have inconclusive and nonspecific applicability in healthcare systems. While twelve colors have been reported as beneficial for health and well-being, a rigorous definition of each of these colors has yet to be provided, making it impossible to know if all color therapists are using the same wavelengths for these colors.

More recently, concern regarding the theory has questioned the risks associated with the emergence of light-emitting diode (LED) based lamps that have been created for use in chromotherapy. These lamps are classified as low risk for exposure and do not require any warnings to accompany the products. However, certain chromotherapy procedures require the individual to place the lamps near their eyes, which is not the recommended use for these lights and may alter the exposure duration to a level that can cause risk of retinal damage. With no consensus or regulation regarding how these products are to be used and whether eyewear is required, this treatment puts participants at risk for serious eye damage.

== See also ==
- Colorpuncture
- List of ineffective cancer treatments
- List of topics characterized as pseudoscience
