= Isaac N. Arnold =

American politician (1815–1884)

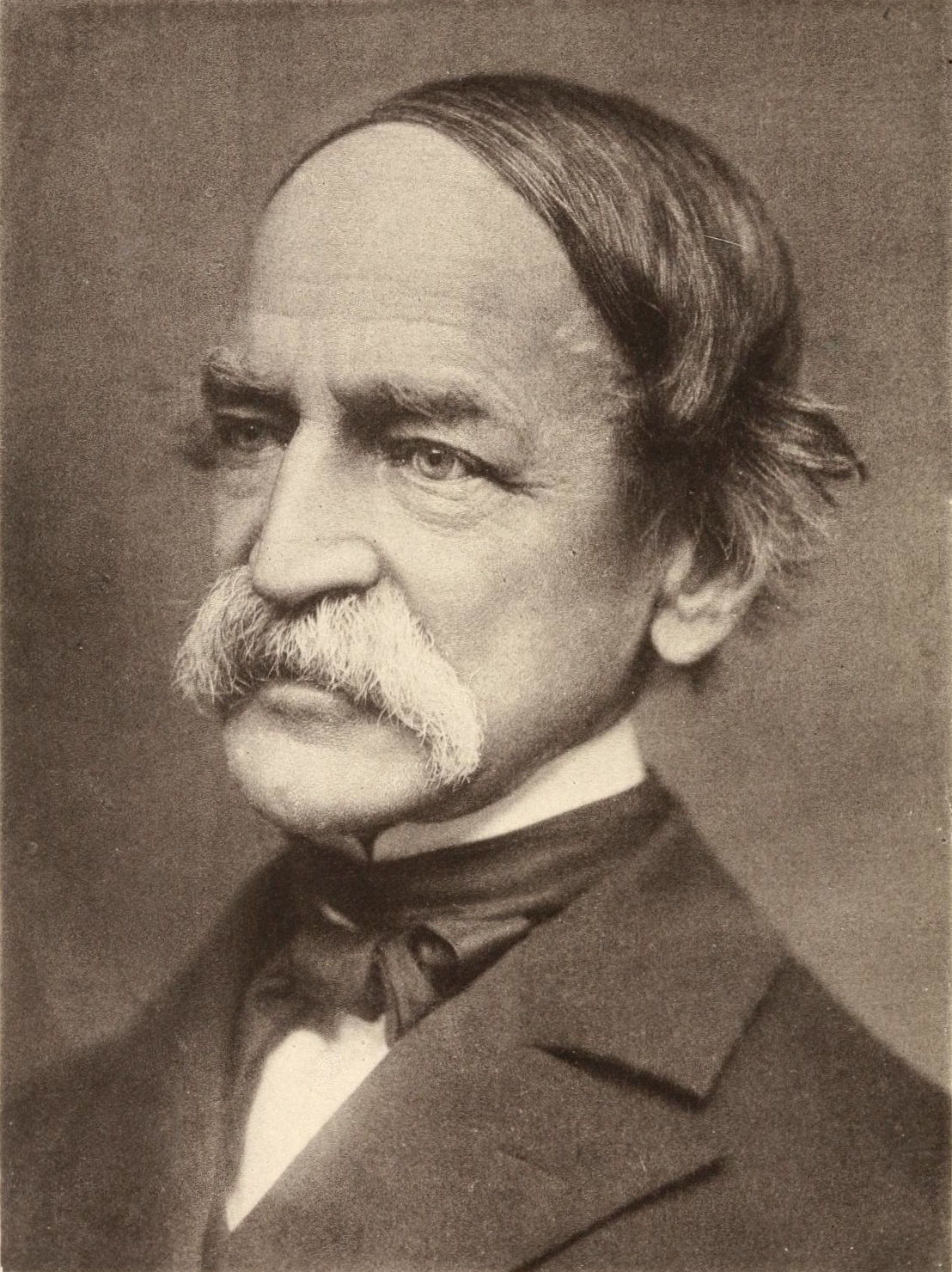
- Arnold in 1884

6th Auditor of the United States Department of the Treasury
- In office 1865–1866
- Appointed by: Abraham Lincoln

Member of the U.S. House of Representatives from Illinois
- In office March 4, 1861 – March 3, 1865
- Preceded by: John F. Farnsworth (2nd); Elihu B. Washburne (1st)
- Succeeded by: John F. Farnsworth (2nd); John Wentworth (1st)
- Constituency: 2nd district (1861-63); 1st district (1863-65)

Member of the Illinois House of Representatives
- In office 1857–1858
- In office 1842–1846

1st Chicago City Clerk
- In office 1837–1838
- Preceded by: James Curtiss (town clerk)
- Succeeded by: George Davis

Personal details
- Born: November 30, 1815 Hartwick, New York, U.S.
- Died: April 24, 1884 (aged 68) Chicago, Illinois, U.S.
- Resting place: Graceland Cemetery
- Party: Republican (after 1860); Free Soil Party (~1848–1860); Democratic Party (before 1848)

Isaac Newton Arnold (November 30, 1815 – April 24, 1884) was an American politician who made his career in Chicago. He served two terms in the United States House of Representatives (1860–1864) and in 1864 introduced the first resolution in Congress proposing a constitutional amendment to abolish slavery in the United States. After returning to Chicago in 1866, he practiced law and wrote biographies of Abraham Lincoln and Benedict Arnold.

== Biography ==
=== Early life, education, and career ===
Born on November 30, 1815 in Hartwick, New York, Arnold was the son of Sophia M. and Dr. George Washington Arnold, natives of Rhode Island who had migrated to New York after the Revolutionary War. He attended common schools, followed by the Hartwick Seminary in 1831–1832. There he joined the Philophronean Society, who debated the issues of the day, including the abolition of slavery.

From 1832 to 1835, Arnold taught school in Otsego County. He studied law with Richard Cooper, and later with Judge E. B. Morehouse of Cooperstown. He was admitted to the bar in 1835 (at the age of 20) and became a partner of Morehouse.

=== Migration west and early elected offices ===
Excited by other possibilities, in 1836 Arnold moved to Chicago, a small village developing as population migrated west after completion of the Erie Canal in New York, which connected Great Lakes shipping to the port of New York City. He became a law partner of Mahlon D. Ogden. In his practice of law, Arnold dealt with cases before Northern Illinois and the Illinois Supreme Court. When arguing before the Supreme Court, he twice was the opposing counsel of Illinois attorney Abraham Lincoln, who he became acquainted with and befriended. When Chicago was incorporated the following year, and Arnold was elected its first city clerk while in 1837 Ogden was elected its first mayor. Arnold left office in order to focus on his legal practice.

In 1842, Arnold was elected to the Illinois House of Representatives as a Democrat and served two terms (from 1842–46). He was a Democratic presidential elector from Illinois in 1844.

Inspired by the issue of abolishing slavery, Arnold was a delegate to the national Free Soil Convention in 1848. He left the Democrats to become an organizer of the Free Soil Party in Illinois. Arnold served an additional term in the state house from 1855 to 1856 under the Free Soil banner.

=== United States House of Representatives (1861–1865) ===
In 1860 he joined the Republican Party and won election to the U.S. House that year. He was reelected in 1862, defeating Chicago mayor Francis Cornwall Sherman (who was the Democratic nominee). A strong supporter of President Lincoln during his tenure in Congress, Arnold pushed emancipation in the territories and nation. He defended Lincoln against critics, including within his party.

In March 1862, during the American Civil War, Arnold introduced a bill to abolish slavery in U.S. territories, which became law in June 1862. In February 1864, he introduced a resolution for a constitutional amendment to abolish slavery throughout the United States, saying:

You can have no permanent peace while slavery lives . ... . Your contest with it is to the death. Your implacable enemy now reels and staggers. Strike the decisive blow. You could not if you would, and you ought not if you could, make terms of compromise with slavery.

— Excerpted from "The Power, Duty, and Necessity of Destroying Slavery in the Rebel States" Speech of Hon. Isaac Newton Arnold of Illinois, delivered in the House of Representatives, January 6, 1864.

He was the first Congressman to introduce a resolution to abolish slavery. In 1865 the Thirteenth Amendment to the United States Constitution was ratified and slavery was ended.

In 1864 Arnold faced a strong challenge from the Democrat John L. Scripps, the postmaster in Chicago, whose appointment he had opposed. By then, Scripps controlled a large field of patronage because of his position. In addition, German Americans made up 25 percent of Arnold's constituents in 1860, and they were unhappy with him about continued drafts of men into the Army. Arnold withdrew from the race in favor of the Republican John Wentworth, the popular former mayor. Wentworth won the seat.

=== Auditor of the Department of the Treasury ===
After he lost his seat in congress, Arnold accepted a presidential appointment from Lincoln as the Sixth Auditor of the Treasury Department. In 1866, Arnold left Washington altogether and returned to his law practice in Chicago.

=== Literary career ===
Arnold was rapidly working on a book about Lincoln. He published The History of Abraham Lincoln and the Overthrow of Slavery in 1867. This was considered a general history that suffered from not having sufficient research.

He did years of research on an earlier historical figure, writing a biography entitled The Life of Benedict Arnold: His Patriotism and His Treason (1880).

Dismayed by contemporary accounts of Lincoln by William H. Herndon and Ward Hill Lamon, Arnold wrote a new biography, The Life of Lincoln (1884), to concentrate on the years of his presidency and refute some of the personal controversial accounts. It was well received at the time, reviewed by the press in the US and Great Britain and, in the late 1940s, it was described as "one of the best of the early biographies." It was reprinted in 1994.

=== Death ===
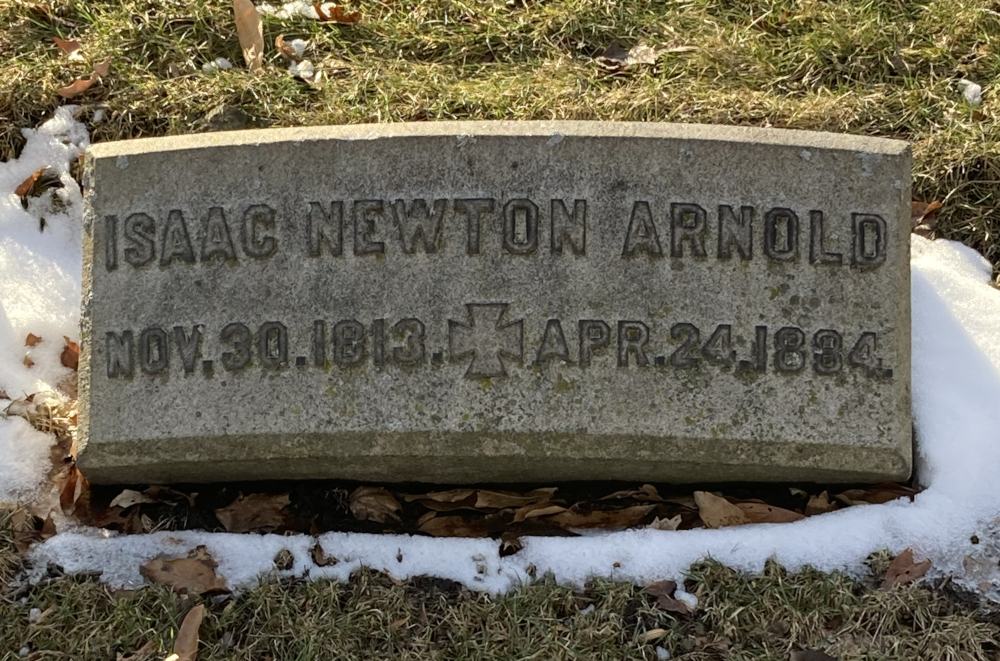
Arnold's grave at Graceland Cemetery

Arnold died April 24, 1884, and was buried at Graceland Cemetery in Chicago.

== Works ==
- Arnold, Isaac N. (1880). Arnold, The life of Benedict Arnold – his patriotism and his treason. Jansen, McClurg & Company.
- Arnold, Isaac N. (1880). Benedict Arnold at Saratoga. Harvard University.
- Arnold, Isaac N. (2007) [1885]. Arnold, The life of Benedict Arnold – his patriotism and his treason. Jansen, McClurg. ISBN 978-0-7950-0433-9.

U.S. House of Representatives
Preceded by John F. Farnsworth	Member of the U.S. House of Representatives from Illinois's 2nd congressional district 1861-1863	Succeeded by John F. Farnsworth
Preceded by Elihu B. Washburne	Member of the U.S. House of Representatives from Illinois's 1st congressional district 1863-1865	Succeeded by John Wentworth
