= John F. Farnsworth =

American politician

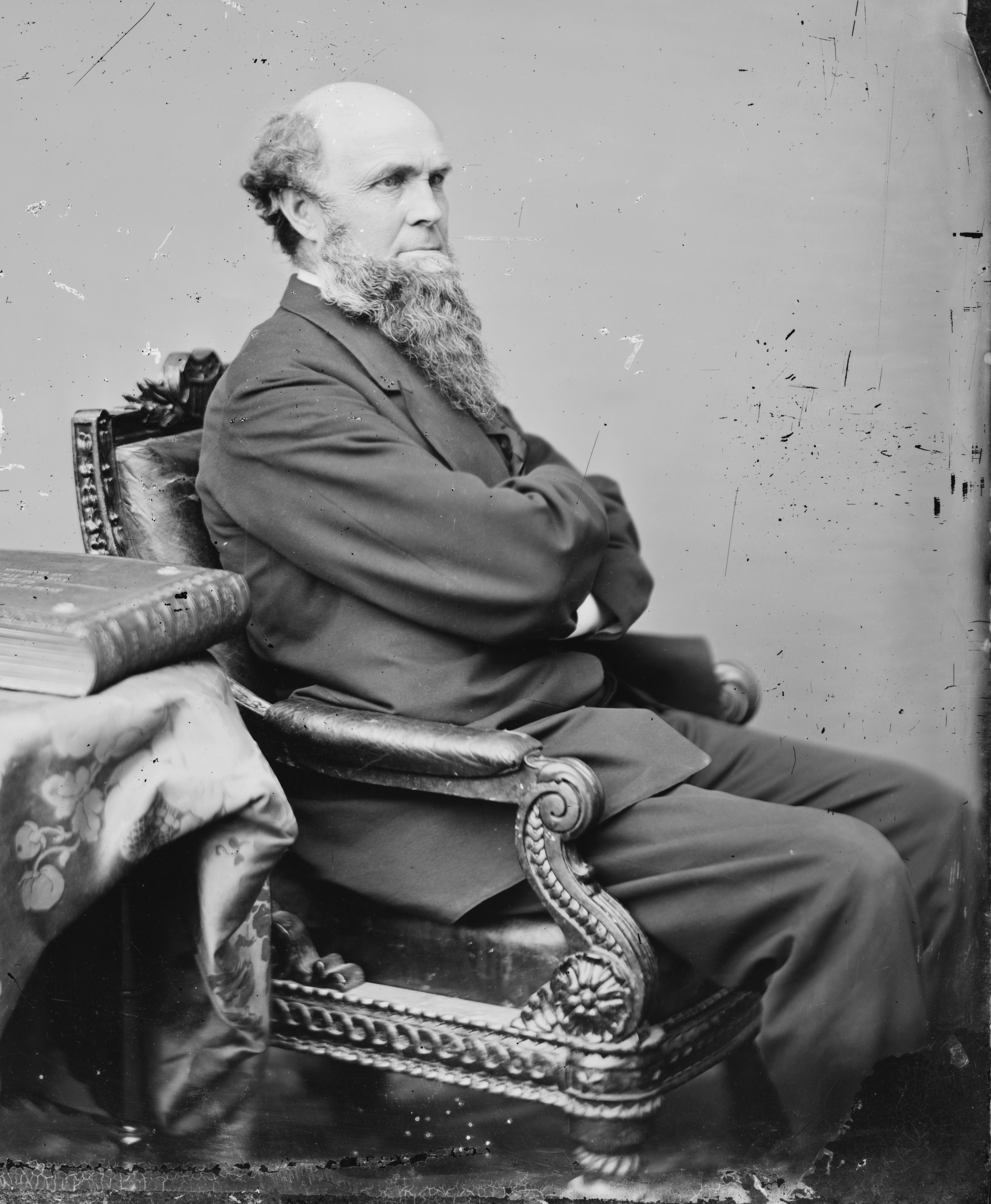

Member of the U.S. House of Representatives from Illinois's 2nd district
- In office March 4, 1863 – March 3, 1873
- Preceded by: Isaac N. Arnold
- Succeeded by: Jasper D. Ward
- In office March 4, 1857 – March 3, 1861
- Preceded by: James Hutchinson Woodworth
- Succeeded by: Isaac N. Arnold

Personal details
- Born: March 27, 1820 Eaton, Quebec (now Cookshire-Eaton, Quebec)
- Died: July 14, 1897 (aged 77) Washington, D.C., U.S.
- Party: Republican

Military service
- Allegiance: United States of America; Union
- Branch/service: United States Army; Union Army
- Years of service: 1861 - 1863
- Rank: Colonel
- Commands: 8th Illinois Volunteer Cavalry
- Battles/wars: American Civil War

John Franklin Farnsworth (March 27, 1820 – July 14, 1897) was a seven-term U.S. representative from Illinois (1857-1861, 1863-1873) and a colonel in the Union Army during the American Civil War. He commanded brigades in the Cavalry Corps from September 1862 to February 1863. He was nominated by President Abraham Lincoln for appointment to the grade of brigadier general on November 29, 1862 but was not confirmed by the United States Senate. His nomination was ordered returned to President Lincoln on February 12, 1863. He resigned his commission in the Union Army on March 4, 1863, the day he started his third term in Congress.

== Early and family life ==
Farnsworth was born in Eaton, Quebec, now Cookshire-Eaton, Quebec, on March 27, 1820, and moved to Ann Arbor, Michigan in 1834. He studied law at the University of Michigan. He was a descendant of Matthias Farnsworth (1612-1688), who immigrated to America from Eccles, Lancashire, England, prior to 1650, settling in Lynn, Massachusetts.

== Early career ==
According to the Biographical Directory of the U.S. Congress, Farnsworth was admitted to the bar in 1841 and began practicing law in St. Charles, Ill. He was elected as a Republican to the 35th and 36th Congresses (March 4, 1857 – March 3, 1861), and was not a candidate for renomination in 1860.

== American Civil War ==
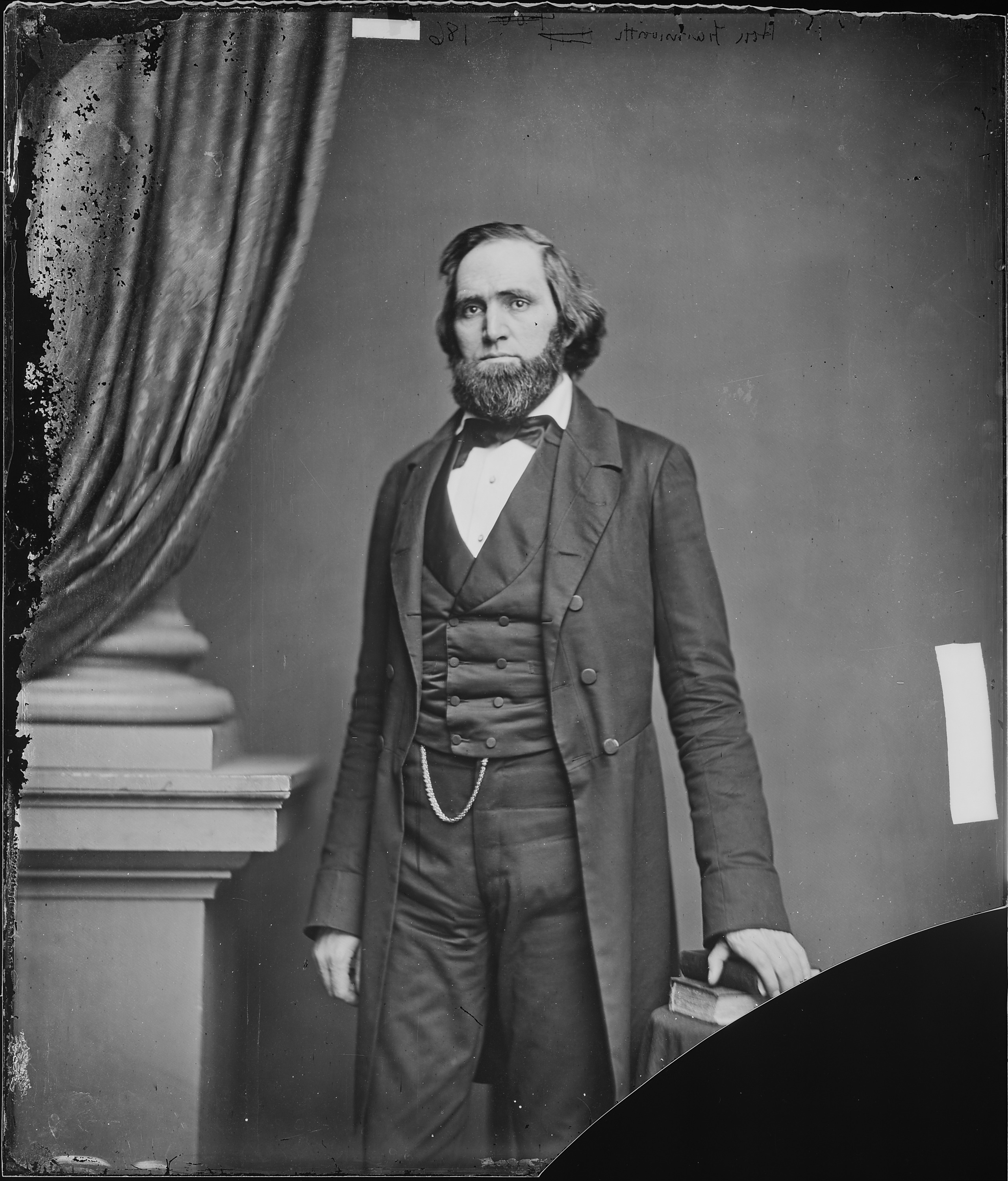
John F. Farnsworth, photograph by Mathew Brady

Farnsworth organized the 8th Illinois Cavalry at President Abraham Lincoln's direction and was commissioned its first colonel. He helped secure a lieutenant's commission for his 24-year-old nephew Elon John Farnsworth, who would die in action at the Battle of Gettysburg. The older Farnsworth also was instrumental in raising the 17th Illinois. He led the 8th Illinois Cavalry during the Peninsula Campaign, seeing action at the Battle of Williamsburg and in the Seven Days Battles.

In September 1862, Farnsworth led a cavalry brigade within the Army of the Potomac during the Maryland Campaign, sparring with Confederate cavalry under J.E.B. Stuart and Wade Hampton in a series of minor engagements near South Mountain and Middletown, Maryland. He was nominated by President Abraham Lincoln for appointment to the grade of brigadier general of volunteers on November 29, 1862 but was not confirmed by the United States Senate. His nomination was ordered returned to President Lincoln on February 12, 1863.

== Resumption of Congressional career ==
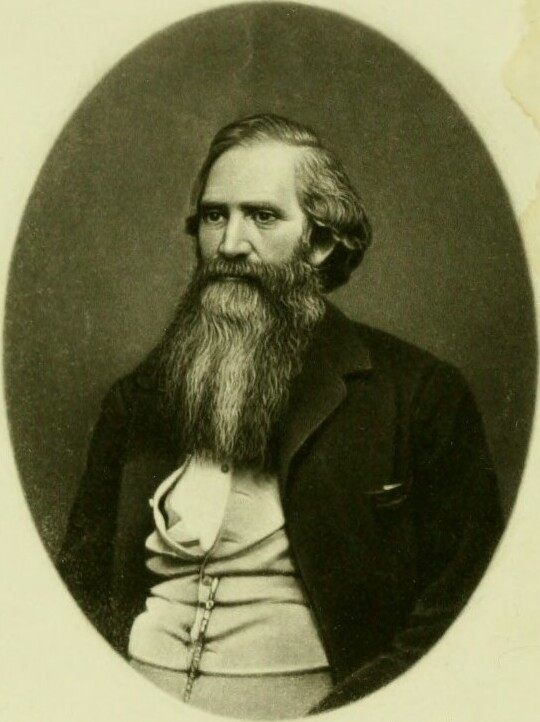
John Farnsworth in the 1860s

Farnsworth resigned his commission on March 4, 1863 to take up his duties as congressman. He elected to the 38th and the four succeeding Congresses (March 4, 1863 – March 3, 1873), and was chairman of the Committee on Post Office and Post Roads. He was a friend of President Lincoln and was among those in the president's room when Lincoln died from an assassin's bullet on April 15, 1865 in the Petersen House in Washington, D.C.

Farnsworth supported Reconstruction policies, and voted in favor of the impeachment of President Andrew Johnson. He was defeated for renomination in 1872 and resumed his law practice in Chicago. He moved to Washington, D.C. in 1880 and continued the practice of law until his death on July 14, 1897.

== Personal life ==
Farnsworth married Mary Ann Clark (1820-1900) from New York in 1846. They had six children: Sarah, Frances, John, William, Adeline and Navy Ensign John Franklin Farnsworth Jr.

== Death and legacy ==
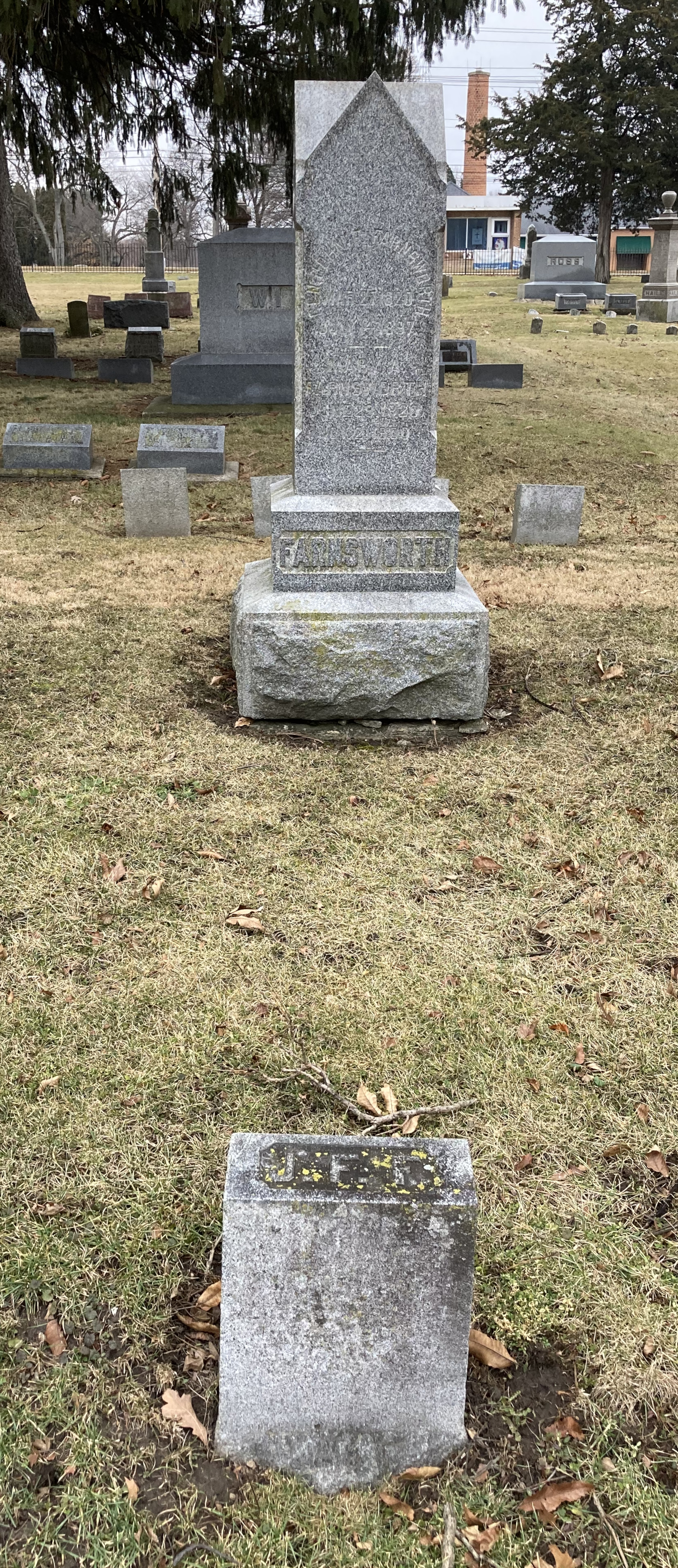
Farnsworth's grave at North Cemetery

Farnsworth is interred in North Cemetery in St. Charles, Illinois.

Farnsworth's mansion in St. Charles, which he built in 1860, was used as a school from 1907 to 1991. A developer bought the property in 1997 with plans to redevelop the site, and in October 1999 the City of St. Charles acquired the home's limestock blocks. A group of local residents established the Farnsworth Mansion Foundation, intending to rebuild the mansion on the former site of Farnsworth's Civil War training ground, Camp Kane.

== See also ==
- List of American Civil War generals (Union)

== Notes ==
U.S. House of Representatives
Preceded by James H. Woodworth	Member of the U.S. House of Representatives from Illinois's 2nd congressional district 1857-1861	Succeeded by Isaac N. Arnold
Preceded by Isaac N. Arnold	Member of the U.S. House of Representatives from Illinois's 2nd congressional district 1863-1873	Succeeded by Jasper D. Ward
