= Stephen Pleasonton =

American treasury official (1776–1855)

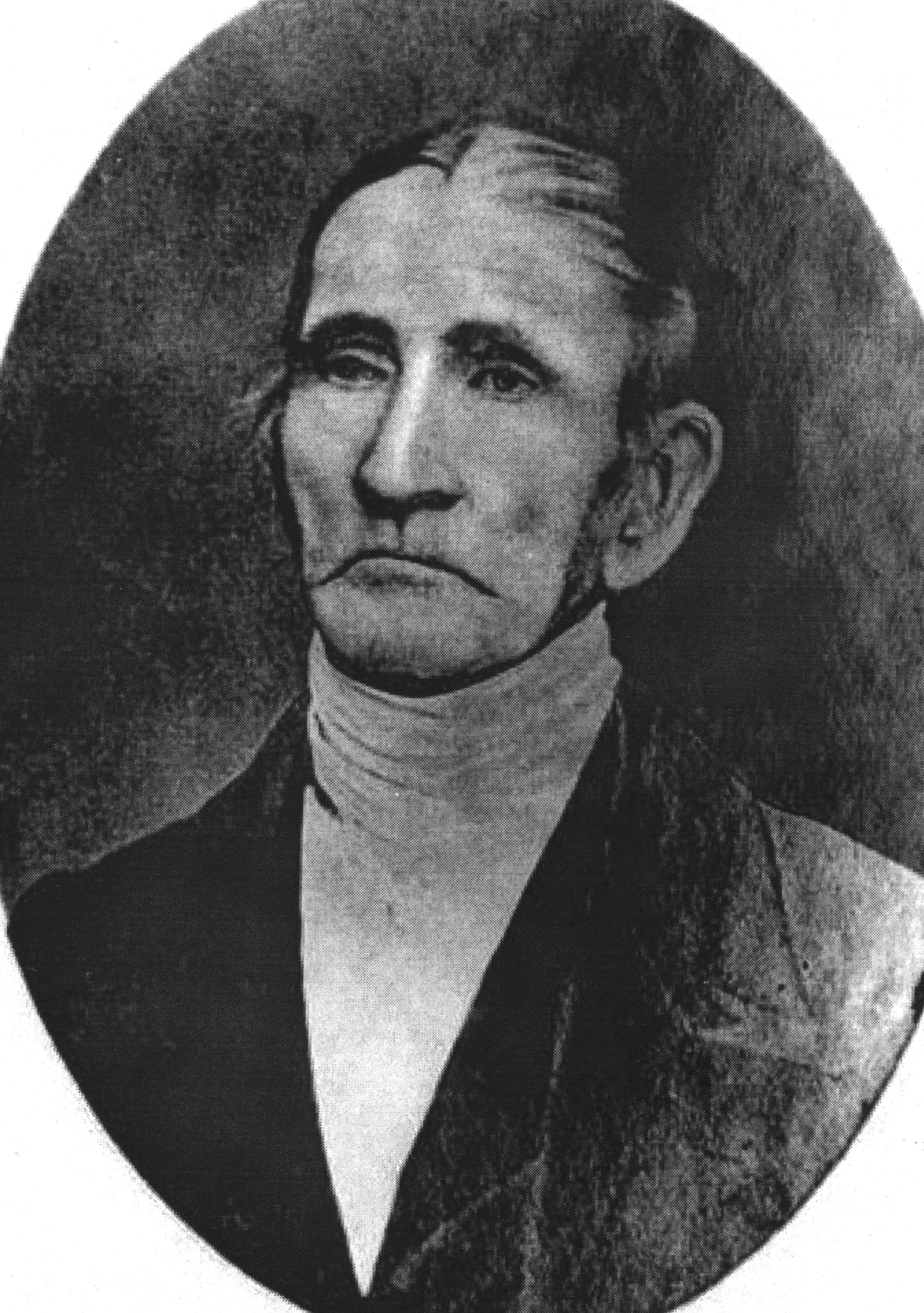

5th Auditor of the U.S. Treasury Department
- In office 1817 – January 31, 1855
- Appointed by: James Monroe

Personal details
- Born: 1778
- Died: January 31, 1855 (aged 76–77)
- Resting place: Congressional Cemetery

Stephen Pleasonton (1778 – January 31, 1855) was the first "Fifth Auditor" of the U.S. Treasury Department; he saved a number of early American government documents from possible destruction and oversaw the Treasury Department's Lighthouse Establishment during most of its existence. He was also the father of Union Civil War generals Alfred Pleasonton and Augustus Pleasonton.

== Early career ==
Little information has survived regarding Pleasonton's early life and career. He began work as a clerk with the State Department. He moved to Washington, D.C. in 1800 along with the U.S. federal government and in 1814 saved an early copy of the Declaration of Independence and other historic papers from being burned by British forces. In 1817, President James Monroe named Pleasonton to the new position of 'Fifth Auditor' in the Treasury Department, which he would hold until his death in 1855. As Fifth Auditor, he was responsible for all domestic accounts pertaining to the Department of State and the Patent Office, all bank, consular, and diplomatic accounts in foreign countries, as well as census accounts, claims adjustments for foreign governments, and boundary commissioner accounts.

== Saving the Declaration of Independence ==
With the War of 1812 going poorly and worried that the British would attack Washington, Secretary of State James Monroe tasked Pleasonton with preserving the books and papers of the State Department. Pleasonton acquired several coarse linen bags and filled them with all the Department's records. This included the still-unpublished secret journals of Congress, the commission and correspondence of George Washington, the Articles of Confederation, the United States Constitution, and all the treaties, laws, and correspondence of the department created since 1789. He had all of this placed in sacks and carted to a grist mill two miles beyond Georgetown. Before Pleasonton left, he noticed the Declaration of Independence had been forgotten and was still hanging in its frame on the wall, and he took that as well. After one more day, Pleasonton became fearful that the British army would destroy a nearby cannon foundry and possibly even the grist mill if it was to come to Washington, and consequently he procured wagons to take the material another thirty-five miles to Leesburg, Virginia, where they were stored in an empty stone house. That night, the British arrived and burned many buildings in the city. While the British left within two days, it was some weeks before the documents were returned to Washington.

== Lighthouse Establishment ==
In 1820 Pleasonton was also appointed to oversee operations of the Treasury's Lighthouse Establishment. As a bureaucrat with little knowledge of maritime matters, the Lighthouse Establishment became an additional concern, so he delegated much of the responsibility of his office to the more directly involved local collectors of customs. Under Pleasonton the collectors became district superintendents of lights and had the authority not only to select the necessary sites for lighthouse construction but also to purchase the land for government use. Superintendents also were required to oversee the actual construction of lighthouses and ensure their repair when necessary. They would also mediate conflicts and deal directly when necessary with lighthouse keepers. Each superintendent was required to submit a yearly report detailing the status of light stations in his charge.

Pleasonton was a frugal administrator, dispensing funds only when absolutely necessary. While this drew praise from government officials, it came at great expense to existing aids to navigation.

== Diamond Shoals Lightship incident ==
In 1826, the Diamond Shoals Lightship off the coast of North Carolina slipped her moorings in a storm; her anchor and chain were ripped from her hull and fell to the sea floor. Despite being advised otherwise by the local superintendent, Pleasonton waited two months before acting. In the event, he offered a $500 reward for the recovery of both anchor and chain, believing a salvage operation to be more cost-effective than replacing the lost parts (a $2000 cost).

== Relationship with Winslow Lewis ==
Also typical of Pleasonton's bureaucratic dealings was the relationship with Winslow Lewis. Lewis, a sometime engineer and inventor, had previously developed a new lighting system and won monopoly contracts for their use and the supply of spermaceti oil in American lighthouses along the east coast. Pleasonton agreed to their continuing use, primarily because he viewed it as cost-effective. The system had its detractors, however, including the brothers Blunt, publishers of the American Coast Pilot; they received many irate letters from various mariners, which they forwarded to Pleasonton. Furthermore, although Augustin Fresnel had developed his revolutionary system of lenses in 1820, Pleasonton refused to sanction their use, viewing them as too expensive. He preferred to remain with Lewis' system, claiming that it was adequate for lighting the American coast.

According to Robert Browning, chief historian of the United States Coast Guard, it is possible that Pleasonton continued to rely on Lewis's lamps instead of adopting Fresnel lenses at least partially due to the nature of the existing lighthouses. Evidence exists that with the Earth's curvature, the Fresnel lenses would have proved no better than Lewis's paraboloid lamps due to the low height of the lighthouse towers themselves and would not be able to be seen at much greater distances.

In the end, it was Pleasonton's refusal to consider Fresnel's system that proved his downfall. Coupled with his support for Lewis' outdated methods, Pleasonton's obstinance led to further investigations by Congress, and eventually the United States Lighthouse Board was formed to remove Pleasonton's influence from the system altogether.

== Death and legacy ==
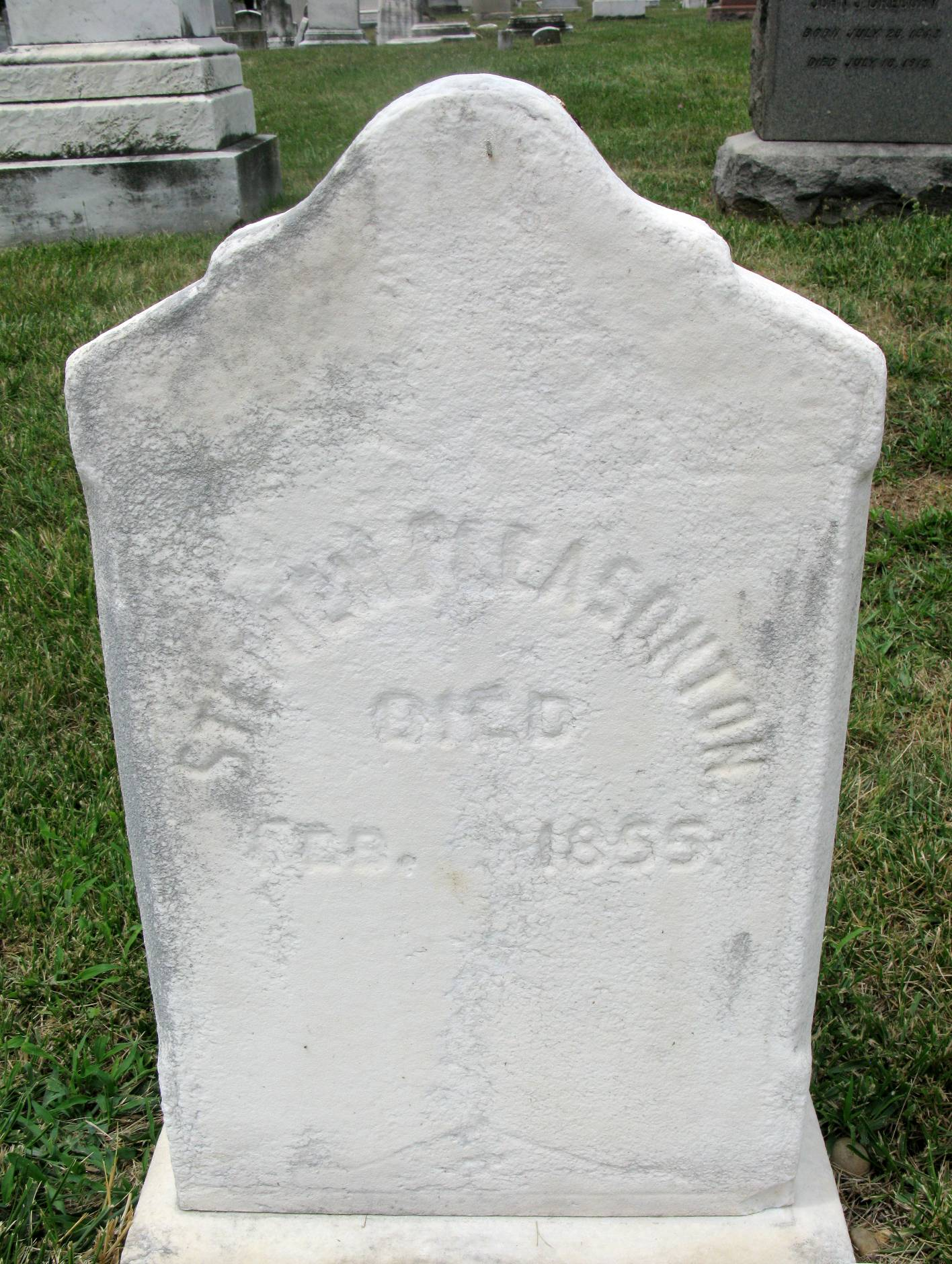
Stephen Pleasonton's gravestone in the Congressional cemetery, Washington, D.C.

Pleasonton was 78 years old when he died on January 31, 1855. He is buried in Congressional Cemetery.

Pleasonton's appointment marked a turning point for the Lighthouse Establishment; responsibility for lighthouses had previously shifted from department to department with no semblance of continuity. His administration lasted until 1852, at which point the United States Lighthouse Board was created; this was the longest period of stability the Lighthouse Establishment had seen up until that point. Still, many historians have criticized Pleasonton's administration, holding that his frugal nature and willingness to cut costs wherever possible did great harm to the Lighthouse Establishment's credibility.
