= Augustus Pleasonton =

United States general

Augustus J. Pleasonton
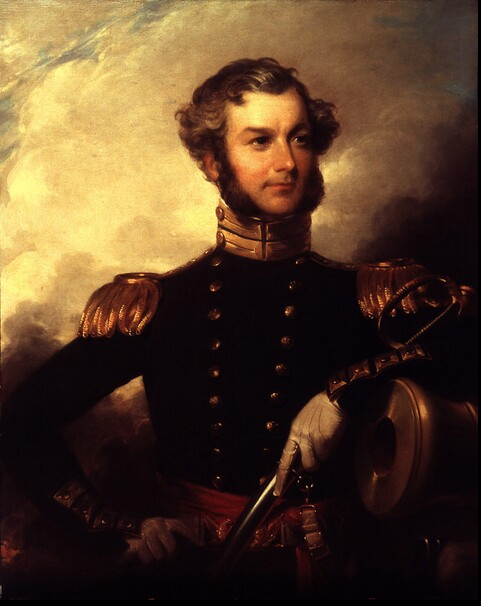
- Portrait of Colonel Augustus James Pleasonton (1846) by John Neagle
- Born: January 21, 1808; Washington, D.C.
- Died: July 26, 1894 (aged 86); Philadelphia
- Occupations: Soldier, lawyer
- Known for: Military service in Buckshot War (1838), Philadelphia Nativist Riots (1844), Mexican–American War and U.S. Civil War; Influence on chromotherapy
- Notable work: The Influence of the Blue Ray of the Sunlight and of the Blue Color of the Sky
- Relatives: Stephen Pleasonton (father); Alfred Pleasonton (brother)

Augustus James Pleasonton, often called A. J. Pleasonton (January 21, 1808 – July 26, 1894), was a militia general during the American Civil War. He wrote the book The Influence of the Blue Ray of the Sunlight and of the Blue Color of the Sky, which was published in 1876. This book is often attributed to being the birth of the contemporary pseudoscientific practice of chromotherapy. He died in Philadelphia, Pennsylvania in 1894.

== Biography ==
=== Personal life ===
Augustus Pleasonton was born in Washington D.C. in 1808. He was the second son of Stephen Pleasonton and Mary Hopkins (from Lancaster, Pennsylvania). Mary was the third daughter of John Hopkins, a wealthy farmer and then Senator of the state of Pennsylvania.

Augustus Pleasonton would go on to serve in the military, directly influenced by his father's public and civil service, as would Augustus' younger brother General Alfred Pleasonton, who commanded the Cavalry Corps in the Civil War.

Pleasonton married Caroline Dugan, and the couple had six children who survived infancy. Caroline died on November 25, 1855. In 1864 he married Elizabeth Hoge.

=== Military service ===
Pleasonton attended the United States Military Academy, graduating in 1826. His first posting was at the Artillery School of Practice between colourless and blue. He claimed that this method greatly increased his production of grapes.

In 1871 Pleasonton published his findings in a monograph entitled On the Influence of the Blue Color of the Sky in developing Animal and Vegetable Life. After continuing his experiments and expanding his theories, in 1876 he published his main work, the book The Influence of the Blue Ray of the Sunlight and of the Blue Color of the Sky: In developing animal and vegetable life; in arresting disease, and in restoring health in acute and chronic disorders to human and domestic animals.

== Influence ==
=== "Blue-glass craze" ===
Pleasonton's theory led to what was called the "Blue-glass Craze", whereby people began growing crops under blue light. Soon, blue panes of glass were being sold as a way to increase crop production.

=== Chromotherapy ===
After Pleasonton's findings, scientist Dr. S. Pancoast studied the blue-light phenomenon and described his findings in his book Blue and Red Light; or, Light and Its Rays as Medicine which was published in 1877. Edwin Dwight Babbitt was also influenced by this concept and published a book about chromotherapy in 1878, entitled The Principles of Light and Color.

=== Pop culture ===
Alternative-rock band OK Go's concept album, Of the Blue Colour of the Sky, is influenced by Pleasonton's book.
