= Potosi's post =

Coordinates: 38.1601°N 94.6678°W

Potosi's Post
- eastern Linn County, Kansas

Site information
- Type: U.S. Army post
- Controlled by: 11th Kansas Cavalry, possibly other units at times

Site history
- Built: ca. August 1863
- In use: ca. August 1863 - October 1864

Garrison information
- Garrison: same

Potosi's post, in eastern Linn County, Kansas, was established at the small town of Potosi, Kansas, founded in 1857 by pro-slavery settlers during the Bleeding Kansas era. Ant-slavery free-staters soon gained control of the town and it was loyal to the Union when the Civil War broke out in 1861. Potosi was located along the north bank of Mine Creek and it was along the military road running from Fort Leavenworth to Fort Gibson. At its height the town had thirty residents, a store and a post office.

== Background ==
In December 1861 a group of 120 men loyal to the Confederacy raided Potosi, basically pillaging most or all of its buildings. Camp Defiance was established 3.5 miles (5.6 km) northeast of Potosi soon after. Later, a group of Union soldiers was stationed at Potosi to protect it. The first time they were mentioned was in August 1863.

Troops continued to stay at Potosi until October 1864. One report said twenty-five troops were at the post. In October Confederate Maj. Gen. Sterling Price and about 10,000 troops were in Missouri on a raid and were moving west toward Kansas. The troops were removed to join the Union forces meeting Price. On October 25, 1864, the Battle of Mine Creek took place about three miles to the west of Potosi. Possibly some Confederate troops camped at Potosi.

The town itself did not last much longer, becoming abandoned in 1869. Today all that remains is an overgrown and unused stretch of the military road, which no longer crosses Mine Creek.
