= Alfred Pleasonton =

Union Army officer during American Civil War

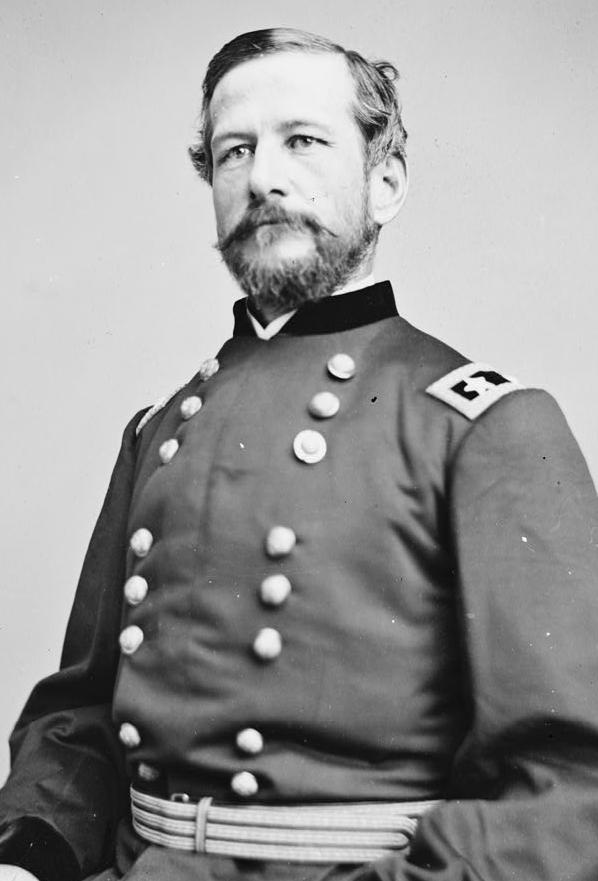
- Alfred Pleasonton, portrait by Mathew Brady

6th Commissioner of Internal Revenue
- In office January 3, 1871 – August 8, 1871
- President: Ulysses S. Grant
- Preceded by: Columbus Delano
- Succeeded by: John Watkinson Douglass

Personal details
- Born: June 7, 1824 Washington, D.C., U.S.
- Died: February 17, 1897 (aged 72) Washington, D.C., U.S.
- Resting place: Congressional Cemetery
- Nicknames: Alf; Knight of Romance

Military service
- Allegiance: United States of America; Union
- Branch/service: United States Army; Union Army
- Years of service: 1844–1868
- Rank: Major General
- Commands: Cavalry Corps
- Battles/wars: Mexican–American War; American Civil War; Peninsula campaign; Battle of Antietam; Battle of Fredericksburg; Battle of Chancellorsville; Gettysburg campaign; Battle of Brandy Station; Price's Raid; Battle of Little Blue River; Battle of Byram's Ford; Battle of Mine Creek; Battle of Marais des Cygnes

Alfred Pleasonton (June 7, 1824 – February 17, 1897) was a United States Army officer and major general of volunteers in the Union cavalry during the American Civil War. He commanded the Cavalry Corps of the Army of the Potomac during the Gettysburg campaign, including the largest predominantly cavalry battle of the war, Brandy Station. In 1864, he was transferred to the Trans-Mississippi theater, where he defeated Confederate General Sterling Price in two key battles, including the Battle of Mine Creek, the second largest cavalry battle of the war, effectively ending the war in Missouri. He was the son of Stephen Pleasonton and the younger brother of Augustus Pleasonton.

== Early life ==
Pleasonton was born in Washington, D.C., on June 7, 1824. He was the son of Stephen and Mary Hopkins Pleasonton. Stephen was well-known at the time of Alfred's birth. During the War of 1812, as a U.S. State Department employee, he saved crucial documents in the National Archives from destruction by the British invaders of Washington, including the original Declaration of Independence and the U.S. Constitution. As Fifth Auditor of the U.S. Treasury, Stephen Pleasonton was the de facto superintendent of lighthouses of the United States from 1820 to 1852. His conservative approach and emphasis on the economy held back advancements in lighthouse construction and technology and led to the deterioration of some lighthouses. Since he had no technical knowledge of the field, he delegated many responsibilities to local customs inspectors. In 1852, the U.S. Congress decided reform was needed and established the Lighthouse Board to take over fiscal and administrative duties for U.S. lighthouses.

Alfred's much older brother, Augustus, attended the United States Military Academy and served as Assistant Adjutant General and paymaster of the state of Pennsylvania; his career direction obviously affected his younger brother's and both boys were assured nomination to the Academy by their father's fame from the War of 1812. Alfred graduated from West Point on July 1, 1844, and was commissioned a brevet second lieutenant in the 1st U.S. Dragoons (heavy cavalry). He was stationed first at Fort Atkinson, Iowa. He followed his unit for frontier duty in Minnesota, Iowa, and Texas. He was promoted to second lieutenant with the 2nd U.S. Dragoons on November 3, 1845. With the 2nd Dragoons, he fought in the Mexican–American War and received a brevet promotion to first lieutenant for gallantry in the Battle of Palo Alto and the Battle of Resaca de la Palma, Texas, in 1846. He was promoted to first lieutenant on September 30, 1849. He served as regimental adjutant from July 1, 1854, to March 3, 1855. Pleasonton was promoted to captain on March 3, 1855.

== Civil War ==
=== Peninsula to Chancellorsville ===
At the start of the Civil War in 1861, Captain Pleasonton traveled with the 2nd Dragoons from Fort Crittenden, Utah Territory, to Washington D.C. Despite active politicking on his part, attempting to capitalize on the faded political connections of his father (who had died in 1855), Pleasonton did not earn the rapid promotions as some of his colleagues had. He was transferred to the 2nd U.S. Cavalry Regiment on August 3, 1861. He was promoted to major on February 15, 1862. He fought without incident or prominence in the Peninsula campaign, providing Army of the Potomac commander Major General George McClellan with little accurate or valuable information. On May 1, 1862, Pleasonton was nominated by President Abraham Lincoln for promotion to the grade of brigadier general of volunteers to rank from July 16, 1862, and the United States Senate confirmed the appointment on July 16, 1862. President Lincoln formally appointed Pleasonton to the grade on July 18, 1862. He then commanded a brigade of cavalry in the Army of the Potomac.

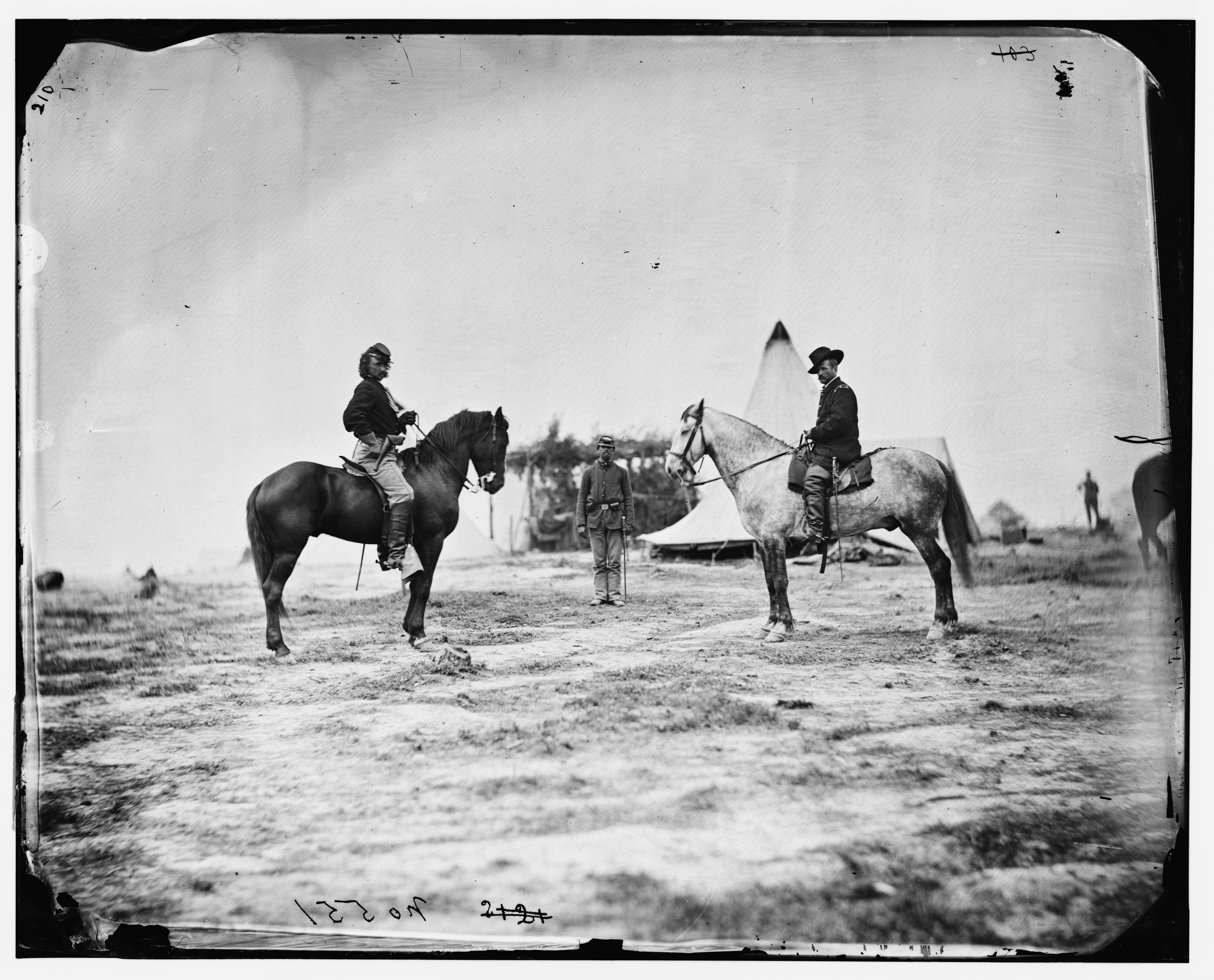
General Pleasonton (right) and Captain George Custer (left) on horseback in Falmouth, Virginia

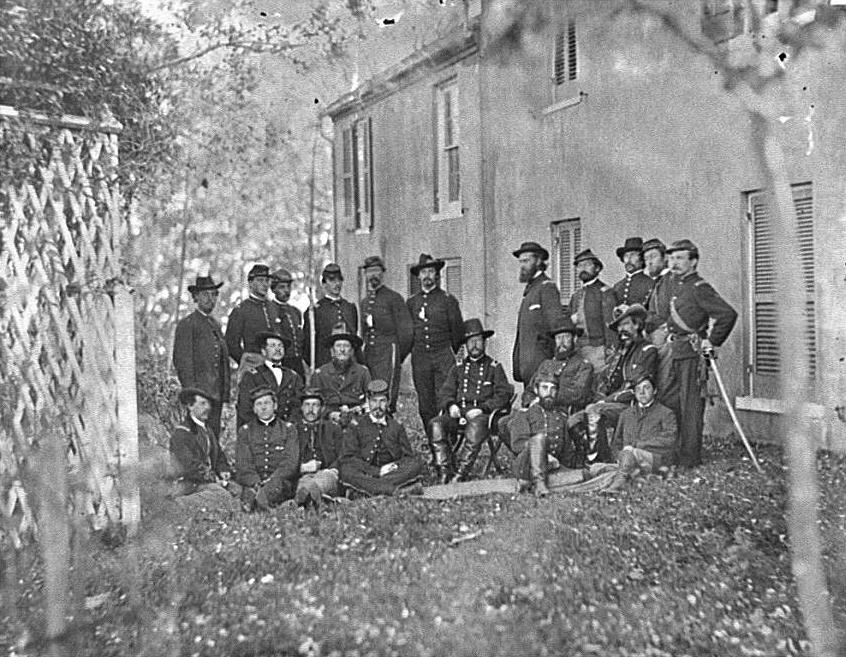
General Alfred Pleasonton and staff in Warrenton, Virginia

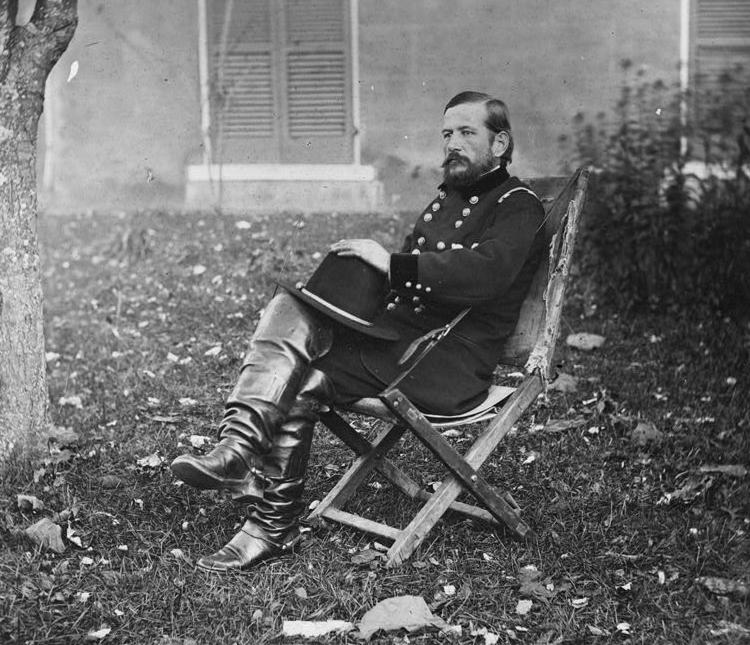
General Pleasonton in Warrenton, Virginia

On September 2, 1862, Pleasonton assumed division command in the cavalry of the Army of the Potomac. As McClellan's chief cavalryman, it was part of Pleasonton's duties to provide his commanding general with intelligence, especially the size of enemy formation. In general, McClellan relied on the erroneous information provided to him by private detective Allan Pinkerton, which resulted in McClellan's idee fixe that he was constantly unnumbered by the Confederate forces he faced. During the Maryland campaign of 1862, Pinkerton had no agents in place, so the task of estimating enemy strength fell to Pleasonton, who turned out to be as inept at it as Pinkerton. As a result, McClellan remained convinced that Confederate General Robert E. Lee's forces outnumbered his two-to-one when the truth was almost exactly the opposite.

He was wounded in the right ear by the concussion of an artillery shell at the Battle of Antietam on September 17. Ever ambitious, Pleasonton was displeased that he was not promoted to major general of volunteers for his actions, claiming erroneously that his division, and particularly the horse artillery assigned to him, had had a decisive effect on the battle. He did receive a brevet promotion to lieutenant colonel in the regular army, probably based solely on the inflated claims of his battle report, which were not substantiated by the reports of other generals.

At the Battle of Chancellorsville, Pleasonton continued his practice of self-promotion. (Note: Historian Stephen Taaffe characterized Pleasonton as "a notorious publicity hound who exaggerated his accomplishments..." Taaffe, 2006, p. 100.) He claimed that he temporarily halted an attack by Stonewall Jackson's Corps and that he was able to prevent the total destruction of the Union XI Corps on May 2, 1863. He was persuasive enough that the commander of the Army of the Potomac, Maj. Gen. Joseph Hooker, told President Abraham Lincoln that Pleasonton "saved the Union Army" at Chancellorsville. Battle reports, however, indicate that Pleasonton's role was considerably less important than he claimed, involving only a small detachment of Confederate infantry on Hazel Grove. Nevertheless, his claims earned him an appointment to the grade of major general of volunteers on and to rank from June 22, 1863, (Note: President Lincoln sent Pleasonton's nomination as major general to the U.S. Senate on December 23, 1863, and the Senate confirmed the appointment on February 29, 1864.) and when the inept Cavalry Corps commander, Maj. Gen. George Stoneman, was relieved after Chancellorsville, Hooker named Pleasonton as his temporary replacement. Pleasonton could not accept even this elevated role gracefully. He wrote to Gen. Hooker "I cannot ... remain silent as to the unsatisfactory condition in which I find this corps ... the responsibility of its present state ... does not belong to me."

=== Gettysburg ===
Pleasonton's first combat in his new role was a month later in the Gettysburg campaign. He led Union cavalry forces in the Battle of Brandy Station, the largest predominantly cavalry battle of the war. The Union cavalry essentially stumbled into J. E. B. Stuart's Confederate cavalry and the 14-hour battle was bloody but inconclusive, although Stuart was embarrassed that he had been surprised and the Union horsemen had a newfound confidence in their abilities. Subordinate officers criticized Pleasonton for not aggressively defeating Stuart at Brandy Station. Gen. Hooker had ordered Pleasonton to "disperse and destroy" the Confederate cavalry near Culpeper, Virginia but Pleasonton claimed that he had only been ordered to make a "reconnaissance in force toward Culpeper", thus rationalizing his actions.

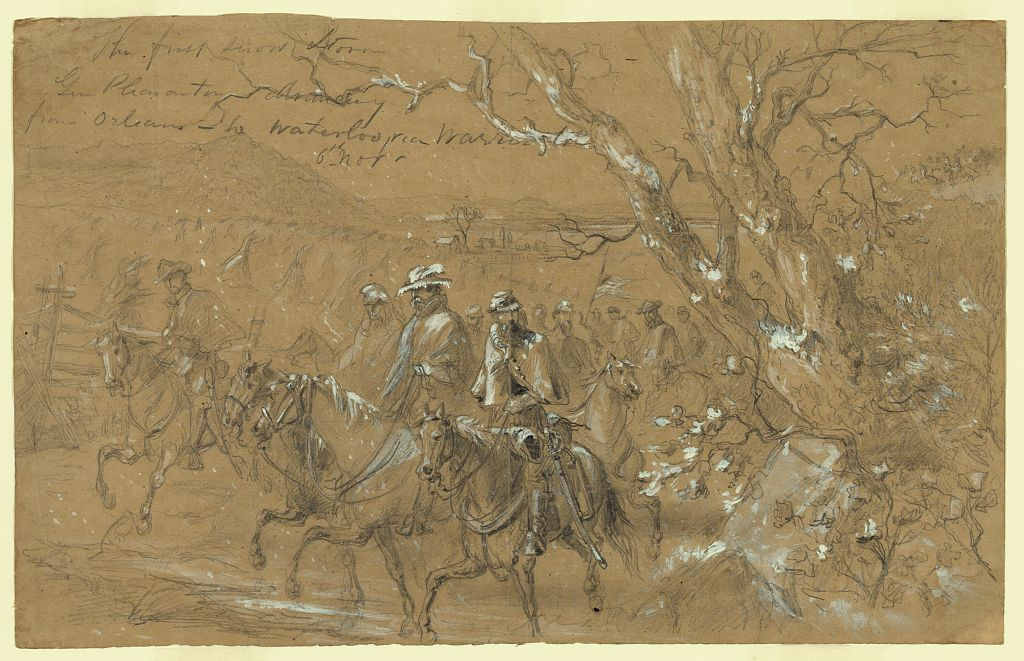
Genernal Pleasonton advancing from Orleans to Waterloo via Warrington in a snow storm

In the remainder of the Gettysburg Campaign up to the climactic battle, Pleasonton did not perform as a competent cavalry commander and was generally unable to inform his commander where the enemy troops were located and what their intentions were. The Army of Northern Virginia, under Gen. Robert E. Lee, was able to slip past Union forces through the Shenandoah Valley and north into Pennsylvania. During this period, he attempted to exercise political influence by promoting the nephew of a U.S. Congressman, Captain Elon J. Farnsworth, a member of his staff, directly to brigadier general. Pleasonton also promoted Captain Wesley Merritt and First Lieutenant George Armstrong Custer to brigadier general.

Pleasonton corresponded with the congressman and complained about his lack of men and horses in comparison to Jeb Stuart's; he also politicked to acquire the cavalry forces of Maj. Gen. Julius Stahel, who commanded the cavalry in the defenses of Washington. The machinations worked. Stahel was relieved of his command and his troopers were reassigned to Pleasonton. Gen. Hooker was enraged by these activities and it was probably only his own relief from command on June 28, 1863, that saved Pleasonton's career from premature termination.

In the Battle of Gettysburg, Pleasonton's new commander, Maj. Gen. George G. Meade, understood Pleasonton's reputation (and his father's) and kept him on a short leash. For the three days of the battle, Pleasonton was forced to remain with Meade at army headquarters, rather than with the Cavalry Corps headquarters nearby, and Meade exercised more direct control of the cavalry than an army commander normally would. In postwar writings, Pleasonton attempted to portray his role in the battle as being a major one, including predicting to Meade that the town of Gettysburg would be the decisive point and, after the Confederate defeat in Pickett's Charge, that he urged Meade to attack Gen. Lee and finish him off. He conveniently made these claims after Meade's death, when dispute was impossible. On the other hand, however, Pleasonton cannot be blamed for the unfortunate cavalry action on July 3, when Meade ordered the division of Brig. Gen. Judson Kilpatrick to attack the right flank of the Confederate army, which resulted in a suicidal assault against entrenched infantry and the futile death of Brig. Gen. Elon Farnsworth. After Pleasonton was removed the field, Meade was impressed with his performance from headquarters as an acting chief of staff during the battle.

=== Trans-Mississippi ===
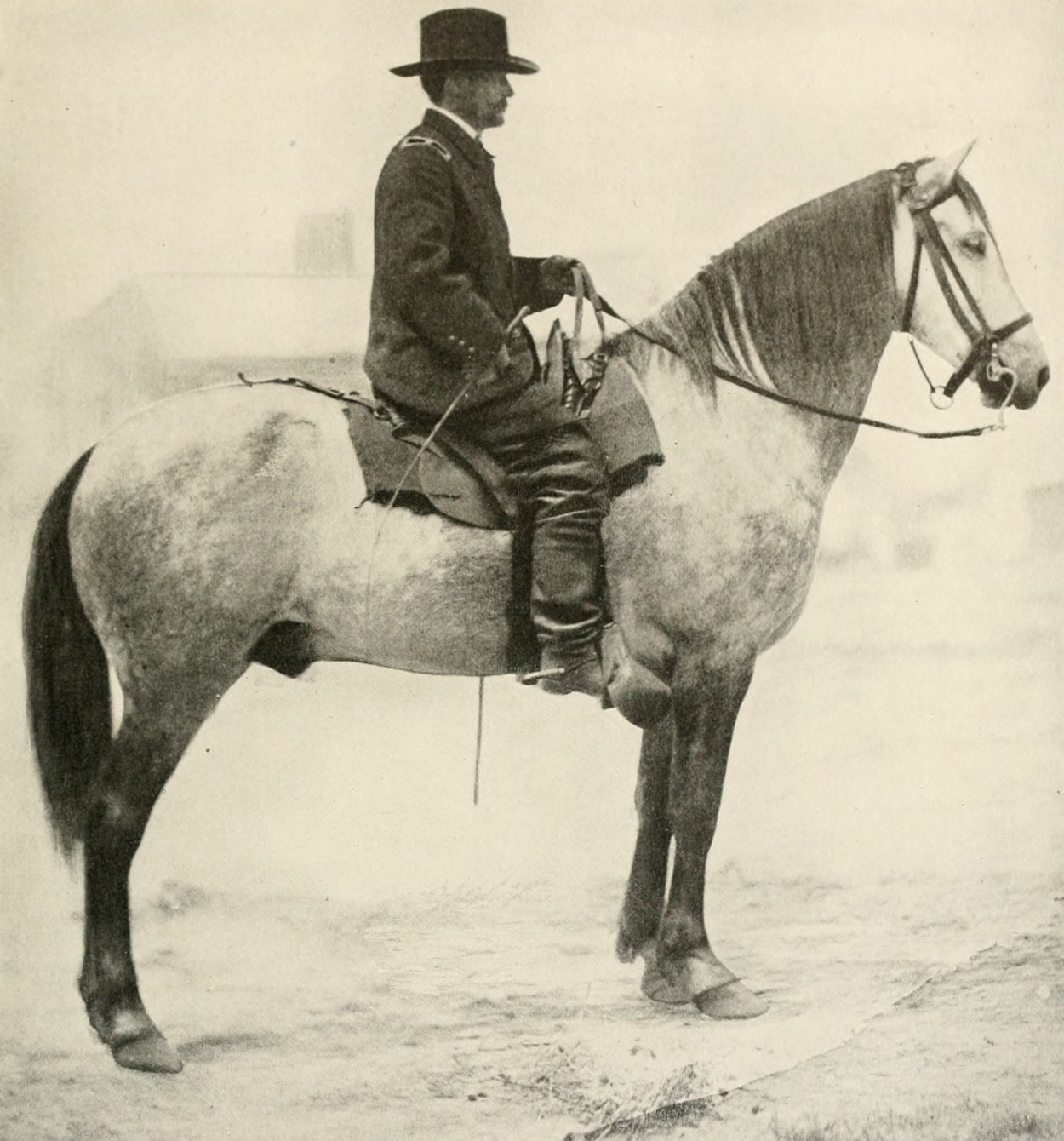
Pleasonton in Falmouth, Virginia, 1864

Pleasonton was transferred to the Trans-Mississippi Theater and commanded the District of Central Missouri and the District of St. Louis on July 4, 1864. He performed well and over a period of four days, defeated Gen. Sterling Price at the Westport, the Battle of Byram's Ford, the Battle of Mine Creek, and the Marais des Cygnes, ending the last Confederate threat in the West. He was injured by a fall in October 1864.

In 1864 and 1865, he instituted a policy of amnesty, granting parole to Confederate prisoners on condition they go up the Missouri River to the Dakota and Montana Territories. This resulted in preventing many of the remnants of Price's army from becoming bushrangers, like Quantrill, and also resulted in Missouri Confederates migrating to the goldfields of the Montana Territory.

On April 10, 1866, President Andrew Johnson nominated Pleasonton for appointment as a brevet brigadier general in the regular army for the campaign in Missouri, to rank from March 13, 1865, and the U.S. Senate confirmed the appointment on May 4, 1866 (and July 14, 1866, after changes in the date of rank for brevet appointments for non-field service). On July 17, 1866, President Johnson nominated Pleasonton for appointment as a brevet major general in the regular army for his overall conduct in the war, to rank from March 13, 1865, and the U.S. Senate confirmed the appointment on July 23, 1866.

== Postbellum career ==
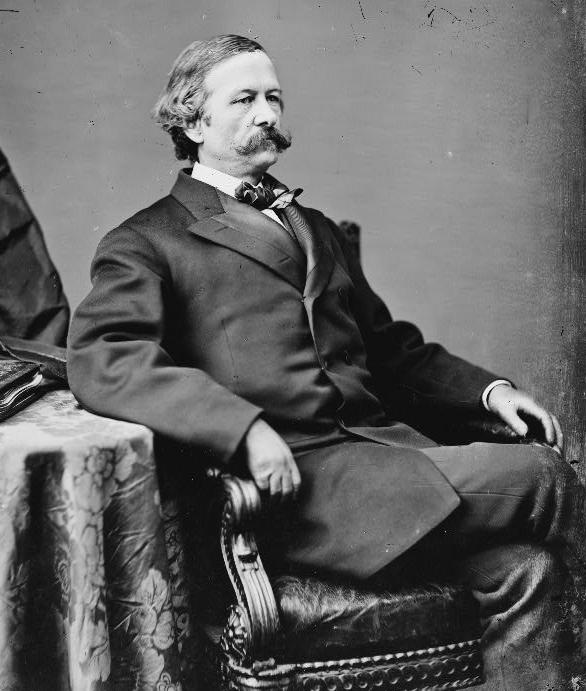
Postbellum

After the war, although Pleasonton had achieved the honorary rank of brevet major general in the regular army, he was mustered out of the volunteer service with the permanent rank of major of cavalry. Because he did not want to leave the cavalry, Pleasonton turned down a lieutenant colonel in the infantry and soon became dissatisfied with his command relationship to officers he once outranked. Pleasonton resigned his commission in 1868 and was placed on the Army's retired list as a major in 1888. As a civilian, he worked as United States Collector of Internal Revenue and as Commissioner of Internal Revenue under President Ulysses S. Grant, but he was asked to resign from the Bureau of Internal Revenue (now the Internal Revenue Service) after he lobbied Congress for the repeal of the income tax and quarreled with his superiors at the Treasury Department. Refusing to resign, he was dismissed. He served briefly as the president of the Terre Haute and Cincinnati Railroad.

In an 1895 interview with sculptor James Edward Kelly, Pleasonton claimed he had been offered command of the Army of the Potomac. (A subsequent interview with Gen. James F. Wade indicated that this offer came in a meeting in Washington some time after Gettysburg.) Pleasonton told Kelly that he "wasn't like Grant. I refused to pay the price." He claimed that the terms offered were: "The war must not be ended until the South was crushed; slavery abolished; and the President reelected." Pleasonton, always more of a bureaucrat than an ideologue or strong leader, only wanted to defeat the South's military capabilities so that they could not threaten the rest of the states, but was not convinced that "crushing" the rebels, ending slavery, or reelecting Lincoln was worth the cost. (Note: Considering Pleasonton's junior rank compared to other available Eastern Federal general officers, his failures commanding cavalry in the East, and his history of self-serving fabrication, Pleasonton's post-war claim that he turned down command of the Army of the Potomac must be treated with great skepticism. Longacre, Edward G. Lincoln's Cavalrymen: A History of the Mounted Forces of the Army of the Potomac. Mechanicsburg, PA: Stackpole Books, 2000. ISBN 978-0-8117-1049-7. p. 248. See also, Longacre, 1986, pp. 47–49, 273. As an example, at page 90, Longacre (1986) wrote: "On 12 June he [Pleasonton] resorted to a blatant lie, telling the army leader [Major General Joseph Hooker] that he had placed pickets as far west as Chester Gap in the Blue Ridge Mountains – a defile Confederate infantry was passing through the same day!")

Alfred Pleasonton died in his sleep in Washington, D.C., on January 17, 1897, and is buried in the Congressional Cemetery there, alongside his father. Before his death, Pleasonton requested that his funeral be devoid of all military honors and even refused to be buried in his old uniform because he felt the Army passed him over after the Civil War.

The town of Pleasanton, California, was named for Alfred in the late 1860s; a typographical error by a U.S. Postal Service employee apparently led to the spelling difference. The city of Pleasanton, Kansas, also named for Pleasonton, held its first "General Pleasonton Days" celebration in 2007. On the huge Pennsylvania Memorial at the Gettysburg Battlefield stands a statue of General Pleasonton.

== See also ==
- List of American Civil War generals (Union)

Government offices
Preceded by Columbus Delano	Commissioner of Internal Revenue; January 3, 1871 – August 8, 1871	Succeeded by John W. Douglass
