= Camp Defiance =

US military encampment 1861–1862

Camp Defiance was a military encampment in eastern Kansas, U.S., during 1861–1862. In December 1861, the town of Potosi, Kansas, along the Kansas-Missouri border, was attacked by Confederate guerrillas. Very soon Col. James Montgomery stationed the Kansas 3rd Regiment about 4 miles (6 km) to the northeast.

== Background ==
The new camp, named Camp Defiance, was established December 17. Camp Defiance was located on the south side of Mine Creek and just barely inside the Kansas border.

Mine Creek provided a natural defense on the camp's north side, as neither man nor horse could have negotiated the water and steep bank. Today the site is heavily wooded and it had at least some timber when it was used.

Dr. Joseph H. Trego, stationed at Camp Defiance, said the camp had a mill and 7,000 board feet (20 m^{3}) of lumber was used to construct stables, mess tables and floors for tents. Very few structures were built and the men stayed in tents. Instead of having a guardhouse, the post had a guard tent.

The camp possibly had more than 2,500 men, as many men from the Lane Brigade were present. Discipline was a major problem at Camp Defiance, as men from the Lane Brigade were in trouble with civilians wherever they went. Trago and John Francis documented numerous problems. Unauthorized absences, vandalism, drunkenness and attempted murder were all documented.

Many of the men in camp were ill and some of the troops were short of tents, clothing, arms and other supplies. In March it was decided to abandon Camp Defiance. The last troops left on March 20 or possibly a bit later.

== See also ==
- Potosi's post
