= Washington and Old Dominion Railroad =

Defunct railroad in northern Virginia, US

Washington and Old Dominion Railway/Railroad
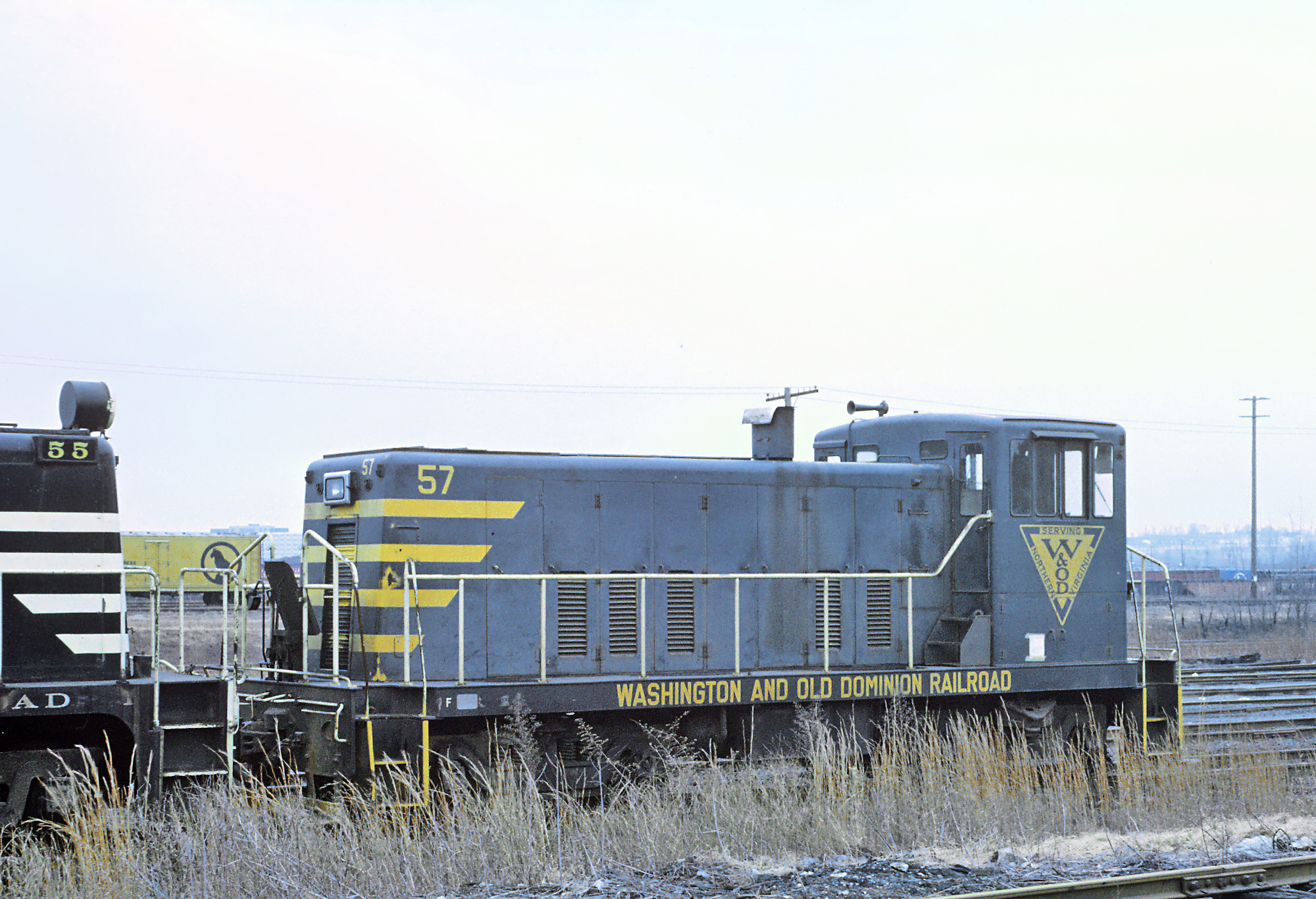
- The former W&OD 57, a General Electric 70-ton diesel–electric switcher locomotive built in 1956, at the Baltimore and Ohio Railroad's Riverside Yard in Baltimore in January 1969

Overview
- Headquarters: Washington, D.C., Arlington County, Virginia, U.S.
- Reporting mark: WOD
- Locale: Virginia, U.S.
- Dates of operation: 1912–1968

Technical
- Track gauge: 4 ft 8 1/2 in (1,435 mm) standard gauge
- Length: 72 miles (116 kilometres)

The Washington and Old Dominion Railroad (colloquially referred to as the W&OD) was an intrastate short-line railroad located in Northern Virginia, United States. The railroad was a successor to the bankrupt Washington and Old Dominion Railway and to several earlier railroads, the first of which began operating in 1859. The railroad closed in 1968.

The Railroad's oldest line extended from Alexandria on the Potomac River northwest to Bluemont at the base of the Blue Ridge Mountains near Snickers Gap, not far from the boundary line between Virginia and West Virginia. The railroad's route largely paralleled the routes of the Potomac River and the present Virginia State Route 7. The single-tracked line followed the winding course of Four Mile Run upstream from Alexandria through Arlington County to Falls Church. At that point, the railroad was above the Fall Line and was able to follow a more direct northwesterly course in Virginia through Dunn Loring, Vienna, Sunset Hills (now in Reston), Herndon, Sterling, Ashburn and Leesburg. The line turned sharply to the west after passing through Clarke's Gap in Catoctin Mountain west of Leesburg. Its tracks then continued westward through Paeonian Springs, Hamilton, Purcellville and Round Hill to reach its terminus at Bluemont. A branch connected the line to Rosslyn.

The W&OD was one of the major commercial and transportation corridors of the northern Virginia area from the mid-nineteenth century through the mid-twentieth century. Though it never reached the Shenandoah Valley or the West Virginia coal country, or allowed Alexandria to compete with Baltimore for western trade as envisioned, it did play a significant role in the development of northern Virginia. It served as a local carrier that was extensively used and fought over during the Civil War; served Washington vacationers headed to the Blue Ridge mountains; hauled agricultural products into Washington; aided the development of Falls Church and Dunn Loring; and, at the end of its operational life, hauled materials used in the construction of Dulles Airport and the Capital Beltway. It is one of the few steam railroads in America to have transitioned to both electric and diesel operations.

After the closure of the railroad, the track was removed. The Washington and Old Dominion Railroad Trail (W&OD Trail), the Bluemont Junction Trail, the Mount Jefferson Park and Greenway Trail, several other trails, Interstate 66 (I-66), and Old Dominion Drive (VA Route 309) have replaced much of the railroad's route.

== History ==
=== W&OD predecessors (1855–1911) ===
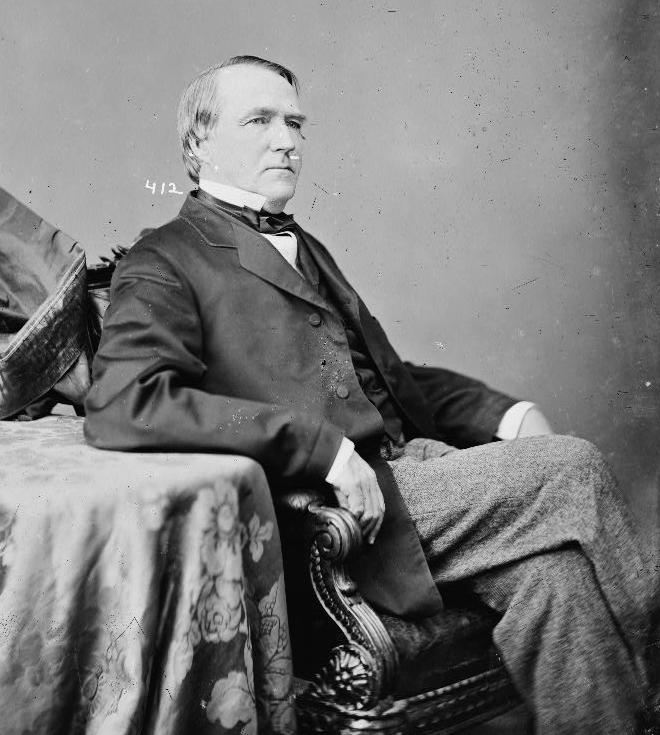
^{Library of Congress} Lewis McKenzie, between 1860 and 1875

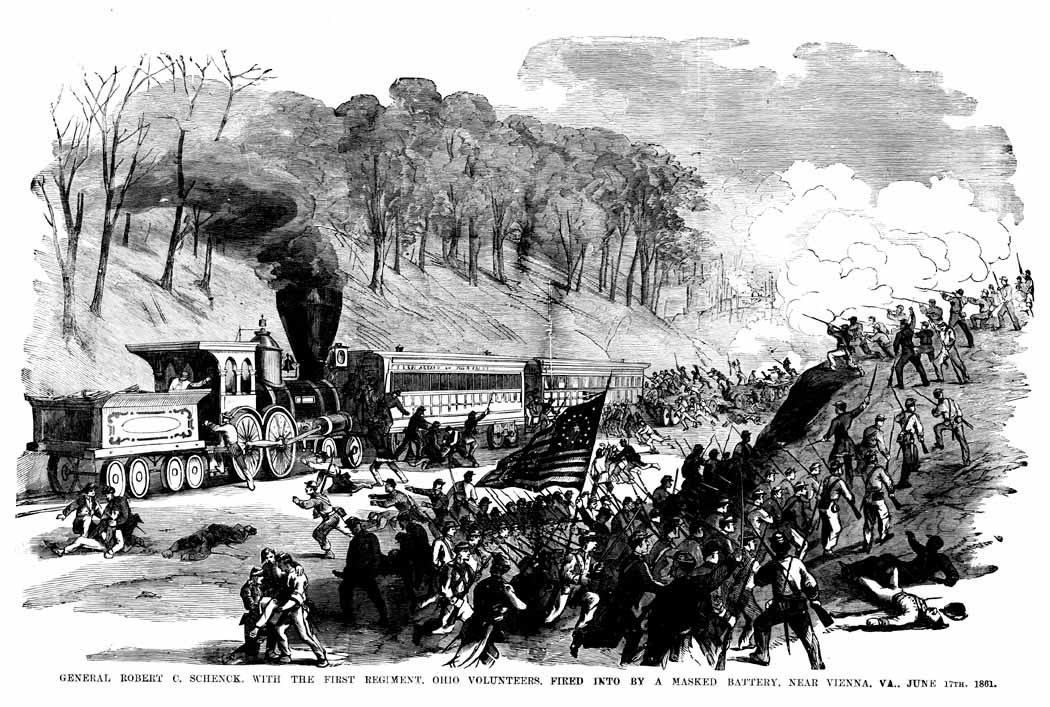
A Union Army train running on the line was the focus of a Confederate States Army attack in the 1861 Battle of Vienna, Virginia

The Washington and Old Dominion Railroad was originally incorporated as the Alexandria and Harper's Ferry (A&HF) Railroad in 1847. The goal of the A&HF was to connect to the Winchester and Potomac River Railroad in Harper's Ferry and thus redirect trade from the Shenandoah that had started going to Baltimore via the Baltimore and Ohio (B&O) Railroad. But in 1848, the Winchester and Potomac became part of the B&O putting an end to that plan.

In 1853 the charter of the A&HF was amended to change the name to the Alexandria, Loudoun and Hampshire (AL&H) Railroad and change the route to pass as close as possible to Leesburg, then through Clarke's Gap and into the Blue Ridge Mountains through the Bloomery Gap of Cacapon to Paddytown in what is now West Virginia and there connect with a railroad serving the coal fields. Construction on the line began in 1855, under the presidency of Lewis McKenzie. Still intending to cross the Blue Ridge Mountains and the Shenandoah River to reach the coal fields that are now within Mineral County, West Virginia, the AL&H began operating to Vienna in 1859 from a terminal near Princess and Fairfax Streets in Alexandria's present Old Town neighborhood.

In early 1860, service was extended to Ashburn and in May to Leesburg in Loudoun County, and the right-of-way had been graded all the way to Clarke's Gap. One of the early passengers was President James Buchanen when visiting his summer White House, the Sterling Hotel in Sterling.

Because of its proximity to Washington, D.C., the line saw much use and disruption during the Civil War. In May 1861 it was seized by Union forces and incorporated into the U.S. Military Railroad. A month later, under General Lee's orders, retreating Confederate troops destroyed much of the line west of Vienna. The Union primarily used the railroad to bring wood into Washington and to supply Union troops at camps south of the city. On June 17, 1861, it was the site of a small battle, when troops from South Carolina ambushed the train near Vienna. The line also benefited from the war, because the Union built connections from it to the Alexandria & Washington railroad and the Orange and Alexandria as well as a new railroad bridge across the Potomac with the AL&H was able to access. At the end of the war, the railroad helped transport the Army of the Potomac back to Washington and on August 8, 1865, it was returned to its original owners. Because of the damage and neglect, service was not restored to Herndon until 9 January 1866 and to Leesburg until 1867.

After the war, the line was extended along the grade built before the war, reaching Clarke's Gap in 1868; and the planned western terminus was changed from Paddy Town via Vestal's gap to Piedmont, WV via Snicker's Gap. In 1870 the western terminus was changed again, this time to Point Pleasant, WV, which required a charter with the new state of West Virginia. In compliance with the new charter the name of the line was changed to the Washington and Ohio Railroad. At the same time, the line was extended to Hamilton (then called Irene Station) and passenger service was doubled In 1874, the line was extended to Purcelleville and then Round Hill, grading began on the Winchester extension (which included a cup through rocks at Scotland Gap between Round Hill and Snickersville) and a new 131-foot Howe truss bridge was erected over Broad Run.

The expense of expansion, the Panic of 1873 and the burden of debt took their toll and in 1878, the Washington and Ohio went into receivership. It was acquired by new owners in 1882 and they changed the name to the Washington and Western Railroad, but it only lasted a year before defaulting on their debt. It was sold again in 1883 and the name changed to the Washington, Ohio and Western (WO&W) Railroad. During this time, owners purchased new rolling stock and upgraded the rail and several bridges.

In 1886, through a series of consolidations, purchases and leases the Richmond and Danville Railroad took control of the WO&W through a lease agreement. The Richmond and Danville also acquired a branch that paralleled the WO&W while traveling between Manassas and Strasburg, Virginia, where it connected to railroads in the Shenandoah Valley west of the Blue Ridge that the WO&W did not reach (see: Manassas Gap Railroad). In 1888, the Richmond and Danville began to operate the WO&W's trains between Washington, D.C., and Round Hill. During this time, President Grover Cleveland frequently rode the train to Leesburg to fish and the town of Dunn-Loring was platted along the tracks.

In 1894, the newly formed Southern Railway absorbed the Richmond and Danville Railroad and acquired the WO&W. In 1900, the Southern Railway extended the line westward for four miles from Round Hill to Snickersville, which was then renamed Bluemont; but abandoned all plans to go to West Virginia. The extension was done to service tourist and day-trippers from Washington. The Southern Railway designated the line as its Bluemont Branch.

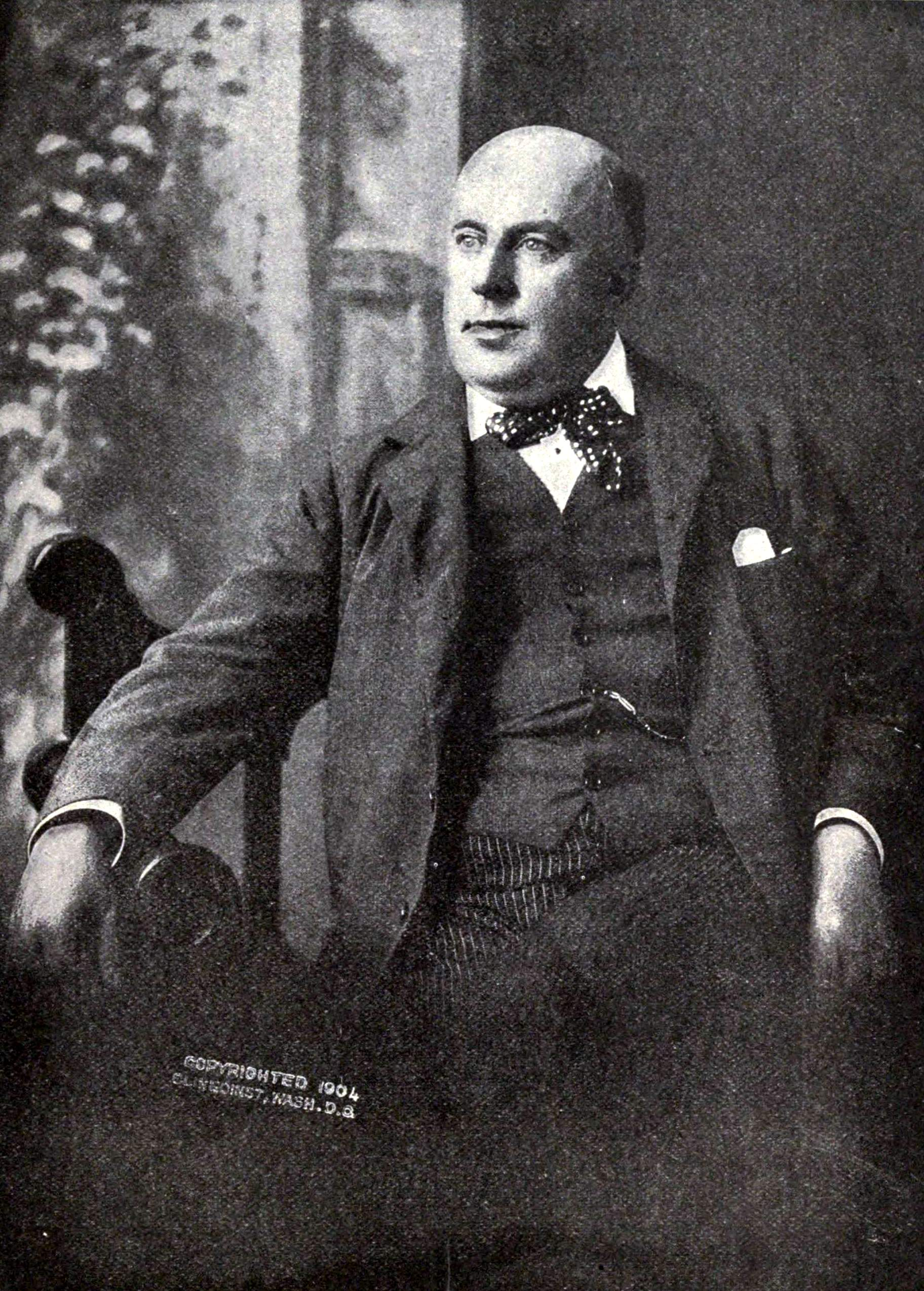
John Roll McLean (1904)

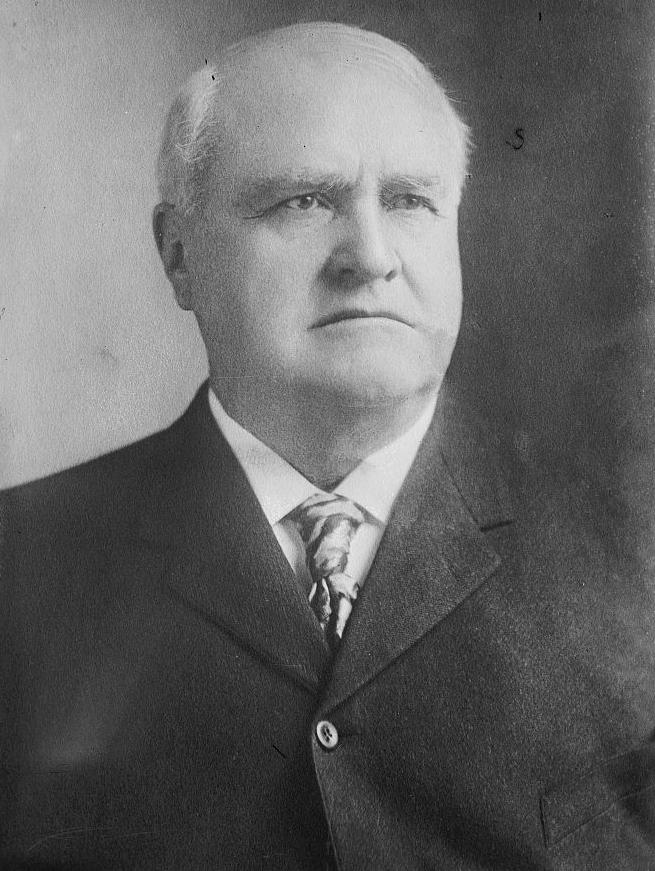
^{Library of Congress} Stephen Benton Elkins

When the Spanish-American War broke out, the War Department built Camp Alger near Dunn Loring and the WO&W found new business ferry soldiers back and forth to the base. It even carried President William McKinley to Camp Alger to see the troops.

By 1908, steam locomotives were hauling Southern Railway passenger trains from Washington Union Station in Washington, D.C., to Alexandria Junction north of Old Town Alexandria, where they switched to travel westward on the Bluemont Branch. Connecting trains shuttled passengers between Alexandria Junction and the former AL&H terminal in old town Alexandria. On weekends, express trains carried vacationers from Washington to Bluemont and other towns in western Loudoun County in which resorts had developed.

Meanwhile, in 1906, electric trolleys began to run on the Great Falls and Old Dominion Railroad (GF&OD) northwest to Great Falls from Georgetown in Washington, D.C. The line, which John Roll McLean and Stephen Benton Elkins owned at the time, crossed the Potomac River on the old Aqueduct Bridge and passed through Rosslyn. The trolleys then traveled northwest on a double-tracked line through Arlington and Fairfax County to reach an amusement park (trolley park) that the railroad company constructed and operated near the falls. The GF&OD had been such a success, that they began to look for opportunities to expand and the Bluemont Branch made a desirable target.

==== Maps ====
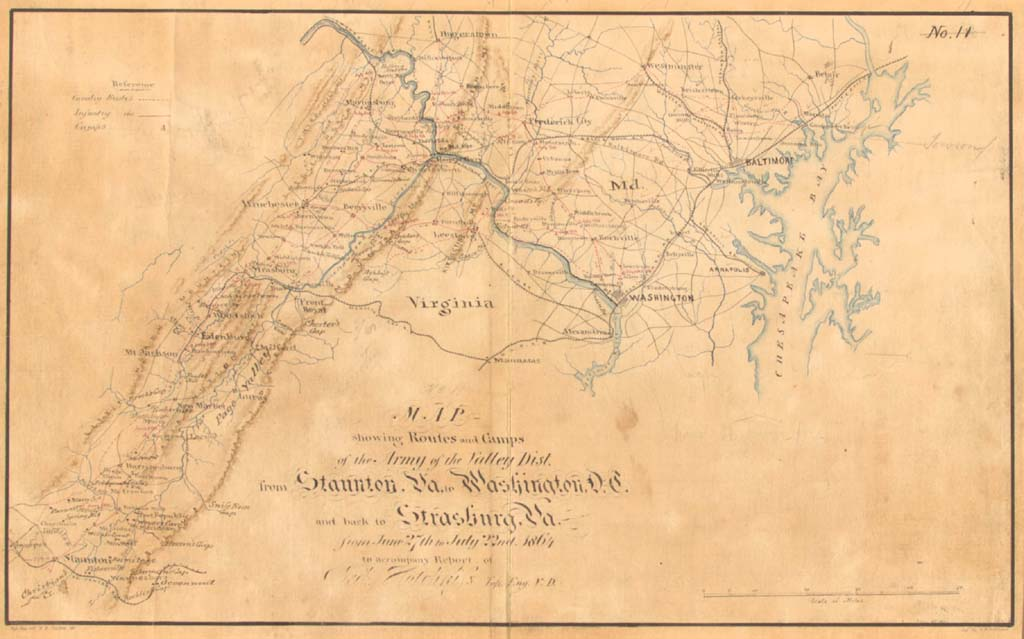
Confederate States Army map of Maryland and northern Virginia showing the route of the Alexandria, Loudoun and Hampshire Railroad, 1864

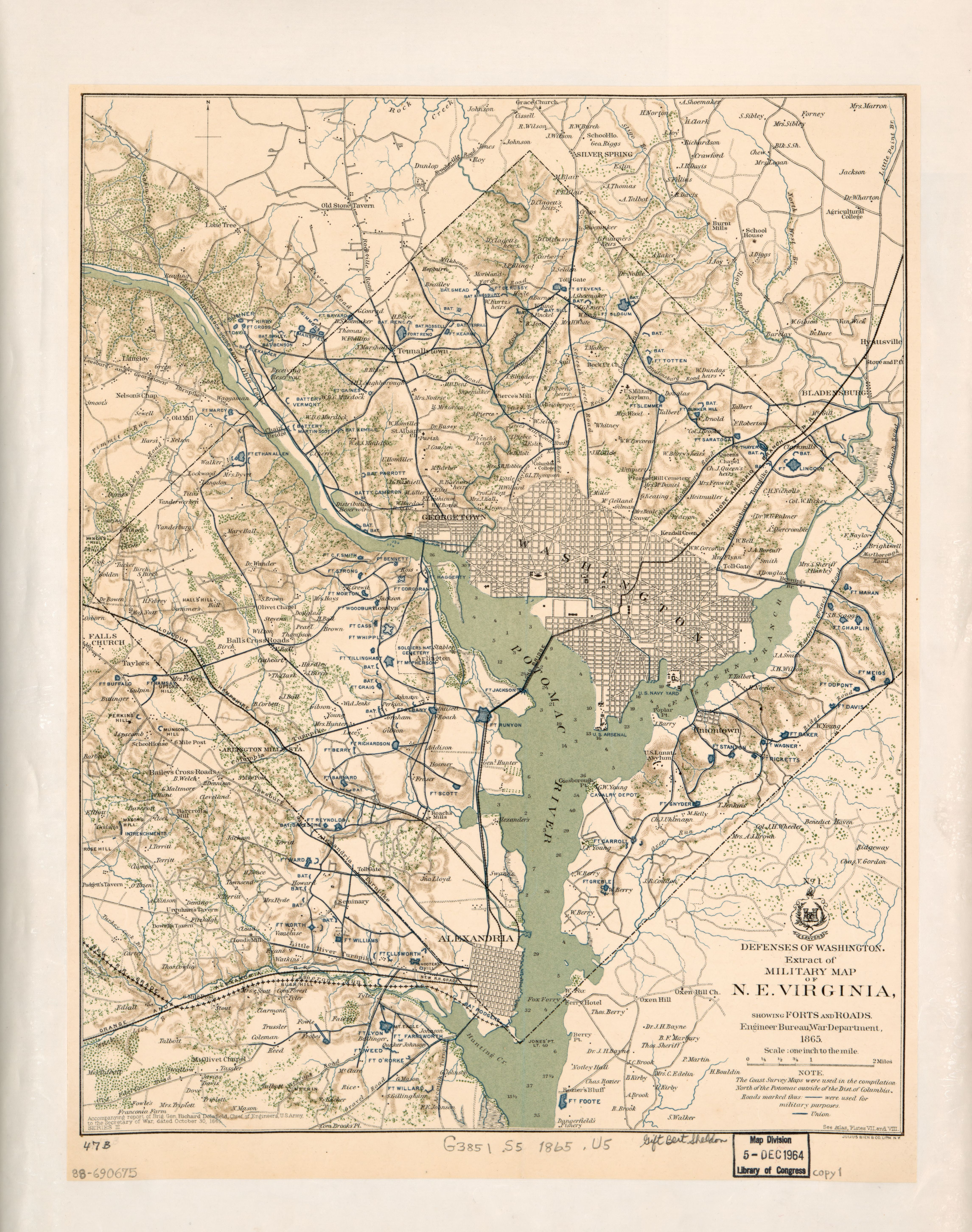
United States military map of Washington, D.C. and northeastern Virginia, showing the route of the Alexandria, Loudoun and Hampshire Railroad, 1865

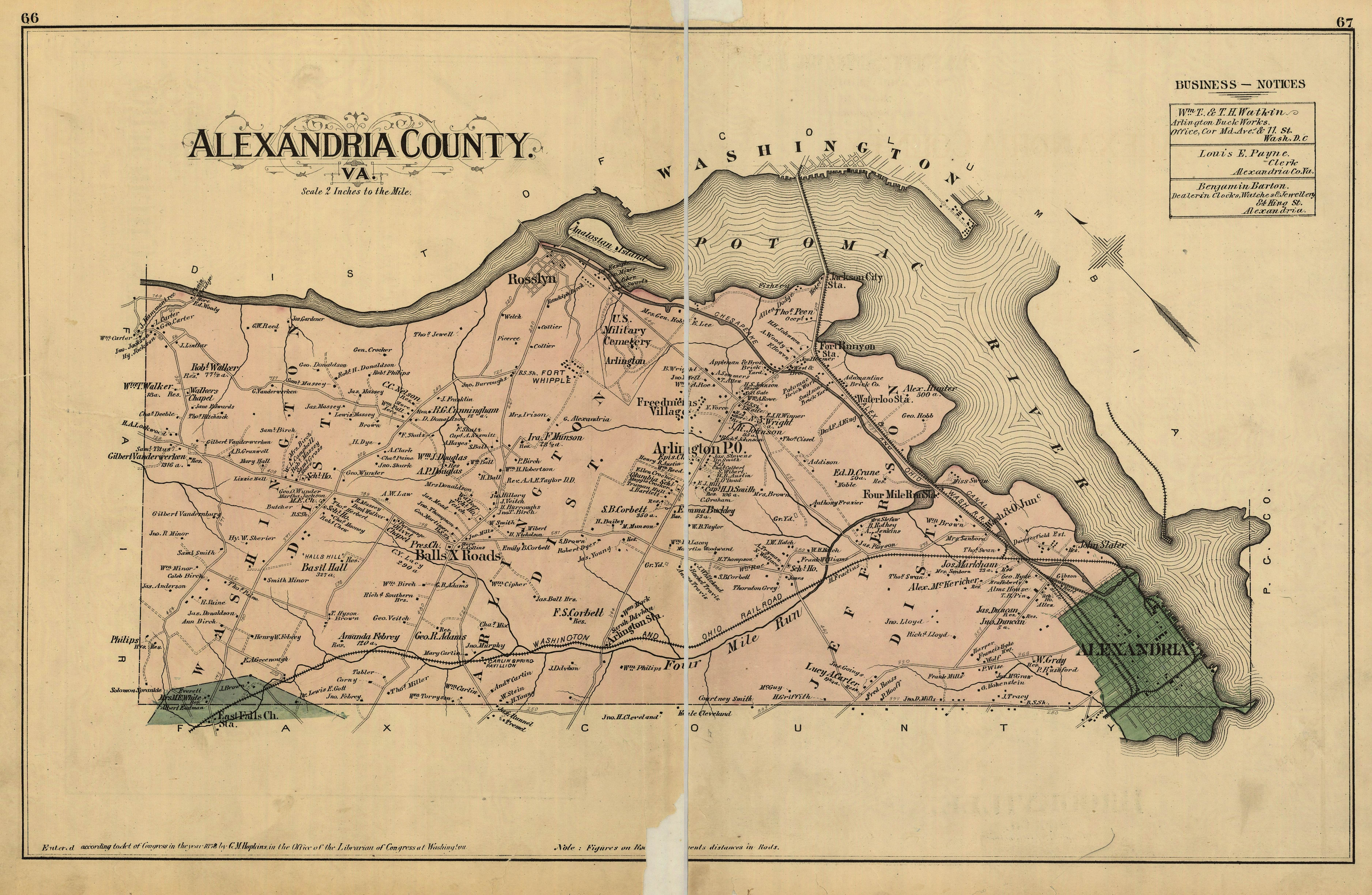
G.M. Hopkins map of Alexandria County, Virginia, showing the route of the Washington and Ohio Railroad, 1878

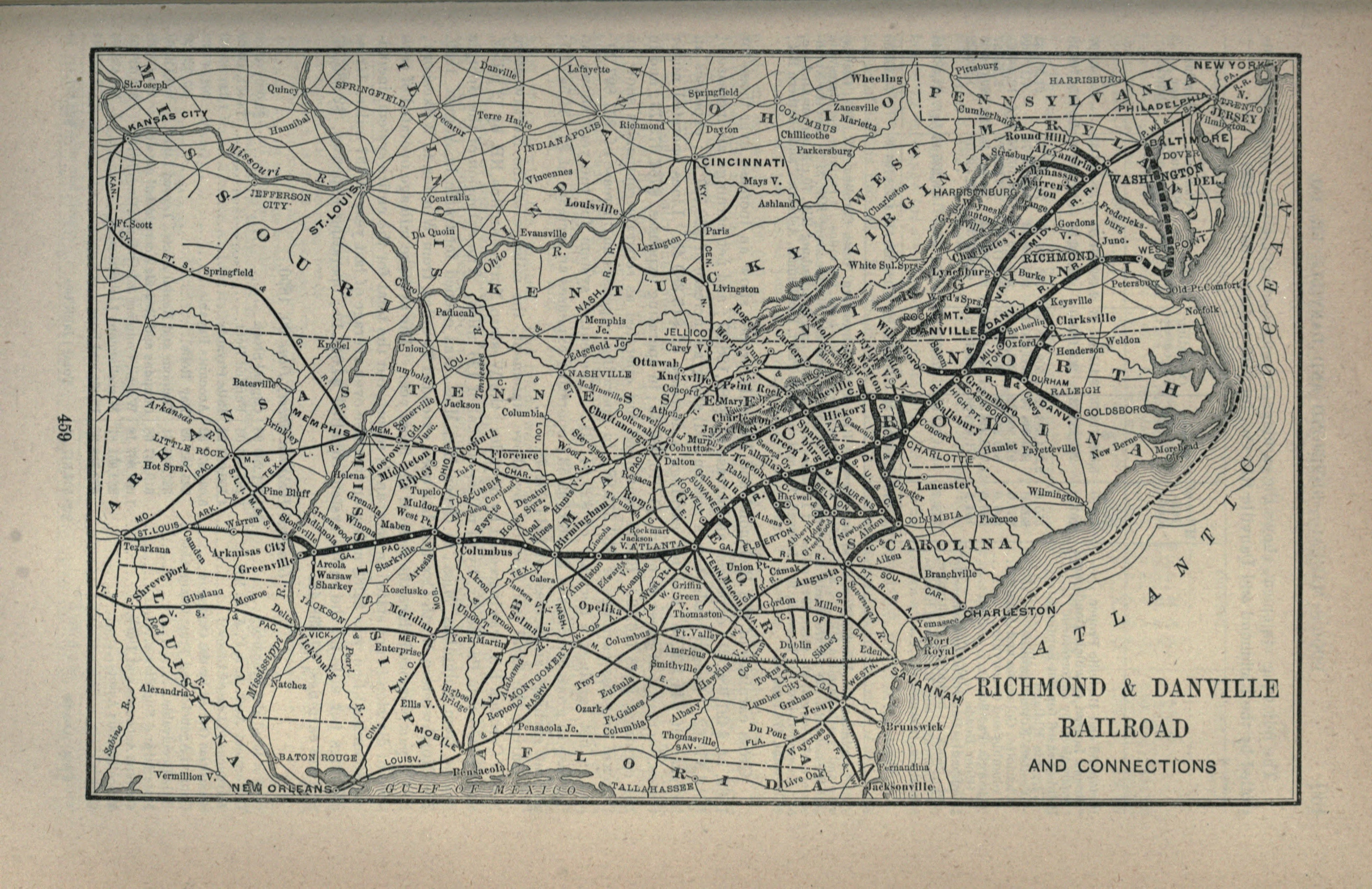
Richmond & Danville Railroad system map showing branch to Round Hill,1891

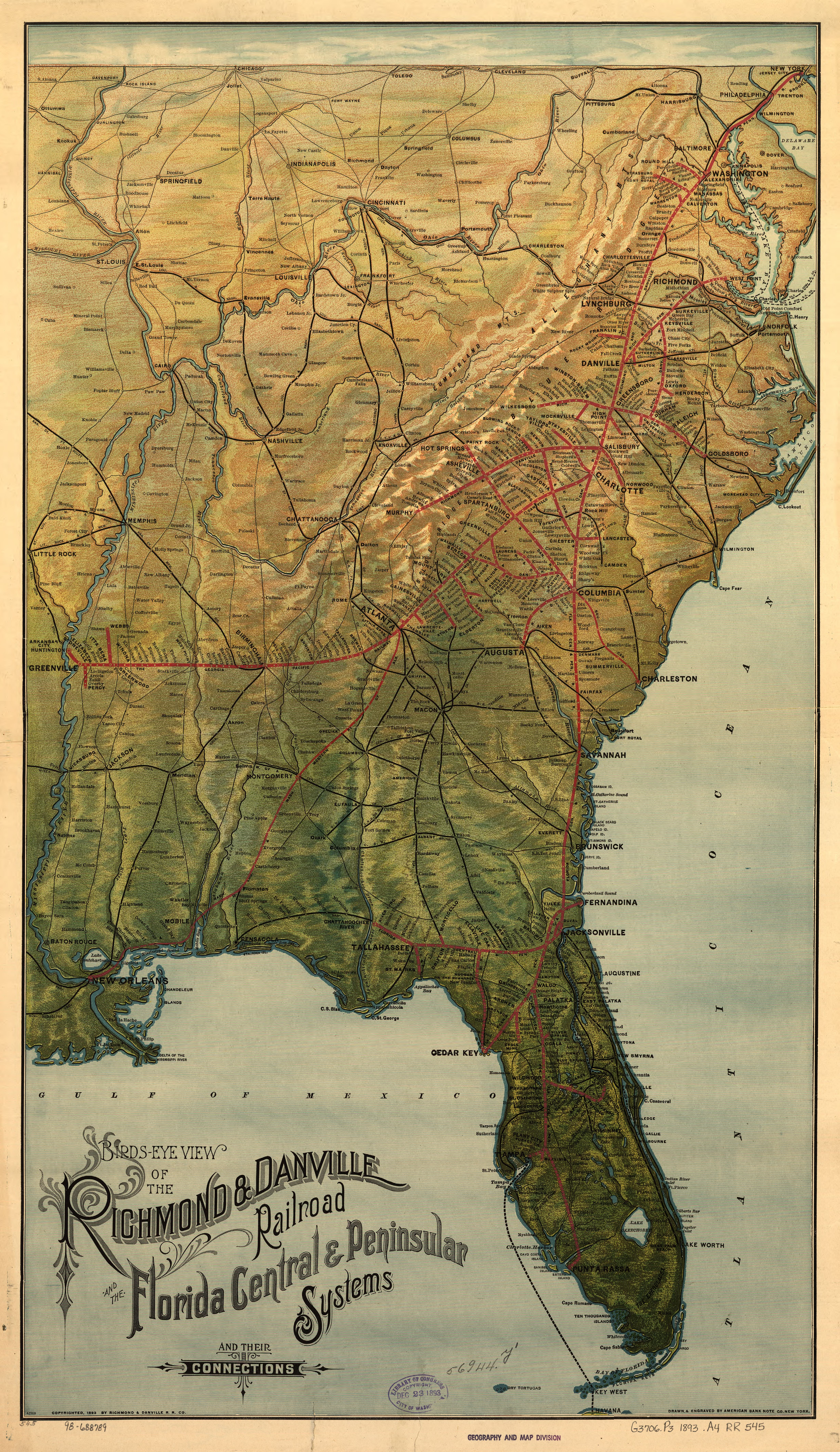
Richmond & Danville Railroad system map showing branch to Round Hill, 1893

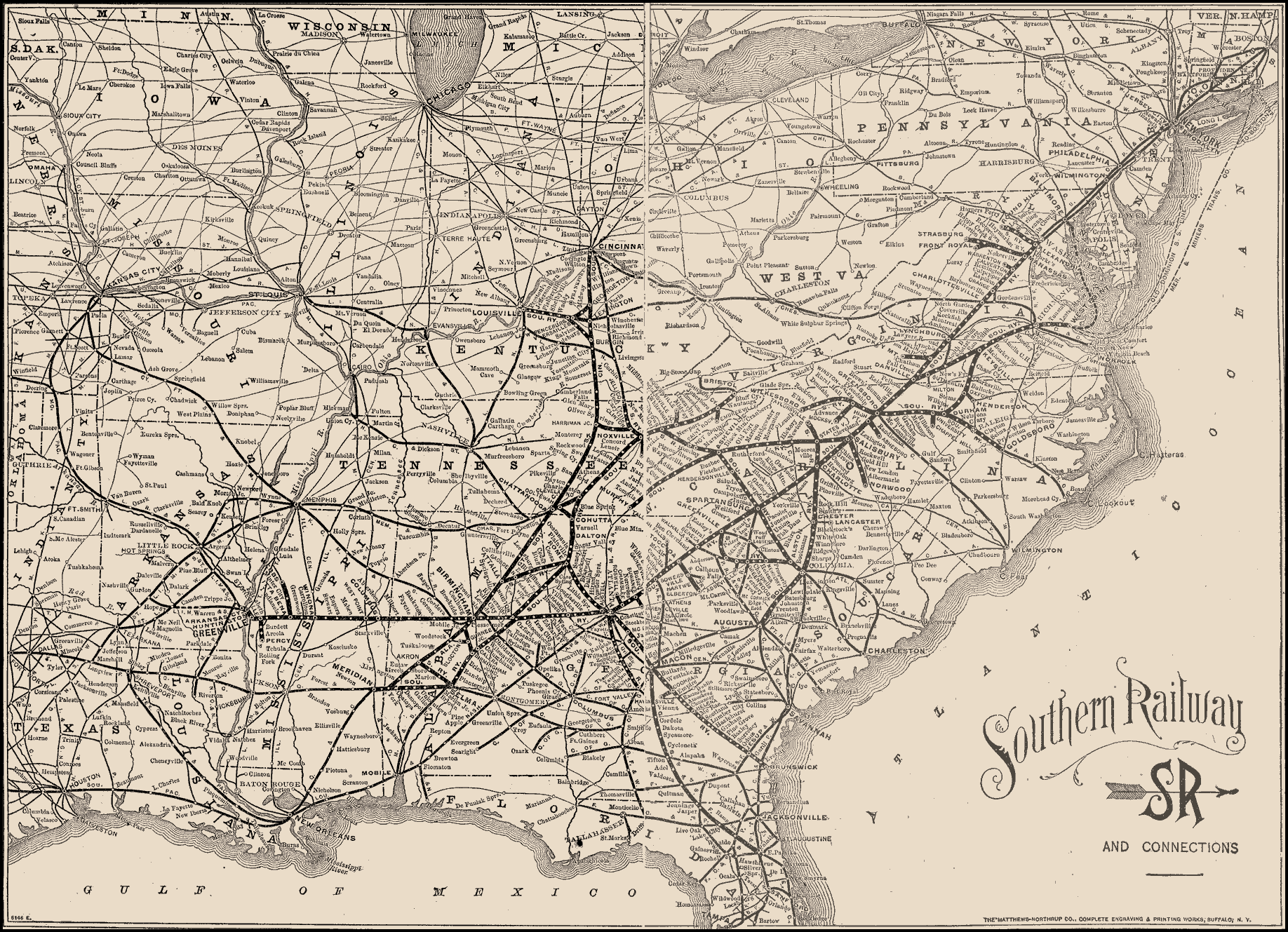
Southern Railway system map showing branch to Round Hill, 1895

=== Washington and Old Dominion Railway (1911–1936) ===
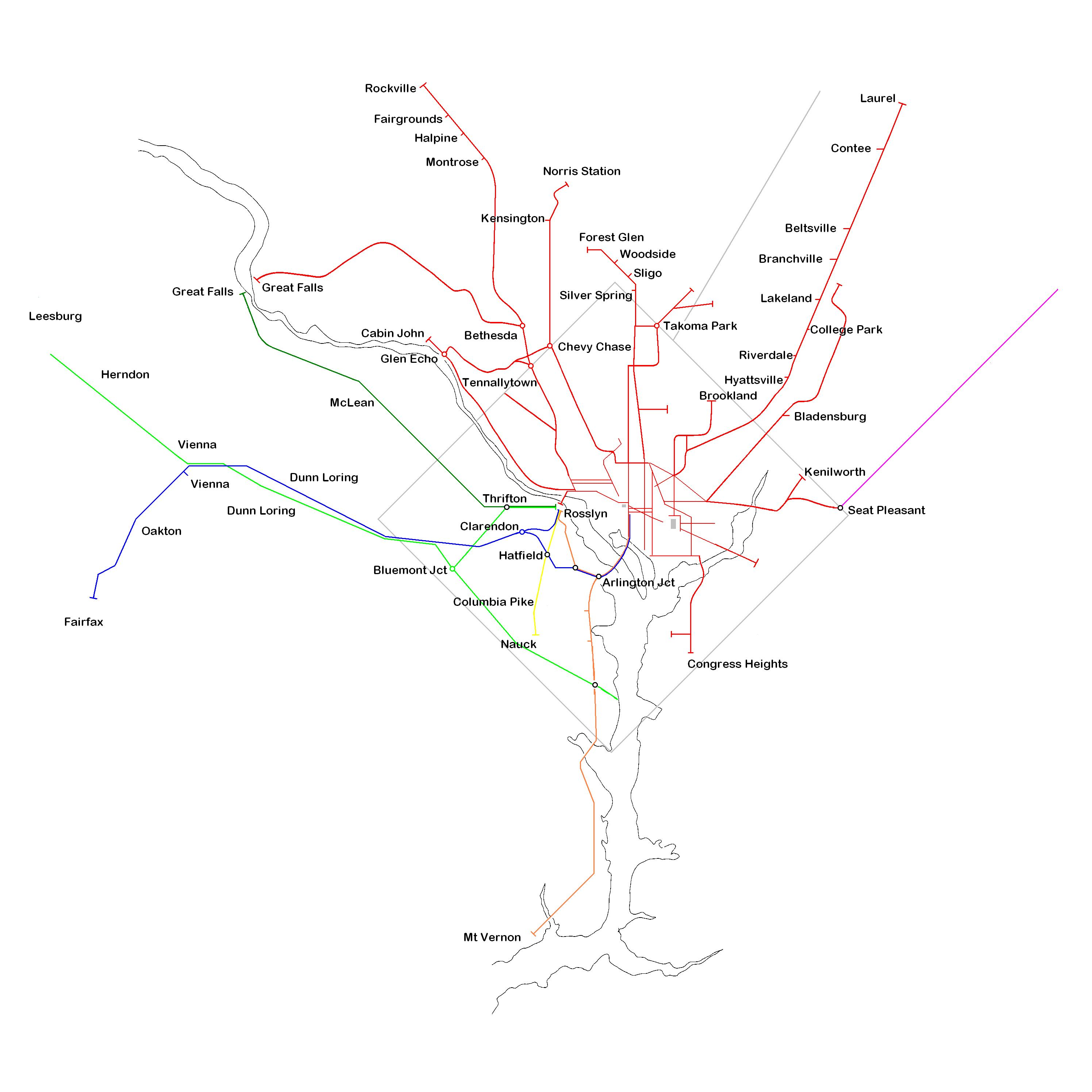
Diagram of Washington area trolley lines c. 1920–1925 (enlargeable image showing the Great Falls Division of the W&OD Railway in dark green and the Bluemont Division in light green).

In 1911, McLean and Elkins formed a new corporation, the Washington and Old Dominion Railway. In that year, they concluded negotiations with the Southern Railway to lease the Southern's Bluemont Branch and to take over all service on the branch on July 1, 1912. The lease excluded the portion of the Southern's route that connected Potomac Yard with the former AL&H terminal in old town Alexandria.

In 1912, the GF&OD became the "Great Falls Division" of the W&OD Railway, while the Southern's Bluemont Branch became a part of the W&OD Railway's "Bluemont Division". The W&OD electrified all of its operations over the next four years, becoming an interurban electric trolley system that carried passengers, mail, milk and freight.

From that time onward, W&OD trains crossed over Potomac Yard, which opened in 1906, on a 1300-foot long trestle constructed around the same time for the Southern Railway. In contrast to the Southern Railway's earlier Bluemont Branch service, the W&OD Railway's Bluemont Division did not serve Washington Union Station.

In the first few months, they invested in several upgrades to the system. To join its two lines, the W&OD Railway constructed a double-tracked Bluemont Division connecting line that traveled between two new junctions in Arlington: Bluemont Junction on the Alexandria-Bluemont line and Thrifton Junction on the Georgetown-Great Falls line. They also constructed a turning wye at Bluemont Junction which ended between 7th and 8th street N. The connecting line passed through Lacey (near the west end of Ballston), crossing on a through girder bridge over a competing interurban electric trolley line, the Fairfax line of the Washington-Virginia Railway (see Northern Virginia trolleys). By October 1912 they had electrified the Bluemont Division from Bluemont Junction to Leesburg and by December all the way to Bluemont.

Most of the Bluemont Division's passenger cars or trains ran on the W&OD Railway's Great Falls Division's line from Georgetown over the Aqueduct Bridge through Rosslyn to Thrifton Junction. From Thrifton Junction, the trains ran on the Bluemont Division's connecting line to Bluemont Junction, where they met other Bluemont Division passenger cars or trains that ran from Alexandria, following Four Mile Run in Arlington. Some of the Bluemont Division cars or trains then continued their trips through Falls Church, Vienna, Herndon, Sterling, Ashburn, Leesburg, Clarke's Gap and Purcellville to terminate in Bluemont, Virginia, at the base of the Blue Ridge Mountains, following a route that was similar to that of Virginia State Route 7.

The railway's electrification system distributed 650 volts direct current (DC) to its Bluemont Division cars and trains through overhead catenary lines, even though by 1912 this system was becoming obsolete by 1200 V systems. Single overhead lines carried the Great Falls Division's electricity over its tracks. Stationary and movable electrical substations containing Westinghouse alternating current (AC) to DC converters were located at Round Hill, Leesburg, Herndon, and Bluemont Junction. .

The W&OD's main passenger line ran from Georgetown and Rosslyn through Thrifton Junction, Bluemont Junction and westward to Bluemont. However, after crossing the Potomac River from Georgetown, many W&OD passengers transferred in Rosslyn to the trolleys of the competing Washington-Virginia Railway. Most of the W&OD's freight trains ran between Potomac Yard, Bluemont Junction and either Rosslyn or various locations along the Bluemont Division.

In 1917, John McLean died from cancer and the railroad ownership passed to his heirs and those of Elkins. The heirs had little interest in running the railroad and in 1918 and 1922 the Virginia Corporation Commission ordered the railroad to make improvements, which the absentee owners never did.

In 1923, the W&OD Railway ceased operating from Georgetown when the federal government replaced the aging Aqueduct Bridge with the new Francis Scott Key Bridge. At the same time, the Capital Traction Company built a new terminal for the W&OD next to its own new loop in Rosslyn in exchange for the W&OD's right to cross the Potomac River into Washington. The W&OD's new Rosslyn passenger terminal then became its "Washington" station.

The W&OD Railway lost money every year after 1912 and fell upon particularly hard times during the Great Depression. In 1932, the railway went into bankruptcy and was again placed in receivership. The receivers chose new management that cut employees, service and rolling stock in an effort to reduce costs. To further cut costs, the railway abandoned operations on the Great Falls Division between Thrifton Junction and Great Falls in stages with the process completed in June 1934, with the last train run on June 8. Several of the cars that ran on the Great Falls line were dismantled later that year and the tracks were pulled up in mid-1935. The abandoned railway route then became Old Dominion Drive (Virginia State Route 309). In 1979, the Great Falls Divisions old rail trestle over Difficult Run, the last physical piece of rail infrastructure still in use from that line, was demolished after years of carrying automobile traffic on Old Dominion Drive. In addition, the receivers also ended passenger service between Bluemont Junction and Alexandria in 1934. With the reduced service they were able to cut their rolling stock by more than half that year.

=== Washington and Old Dominion Railroad (1936–1965) ===
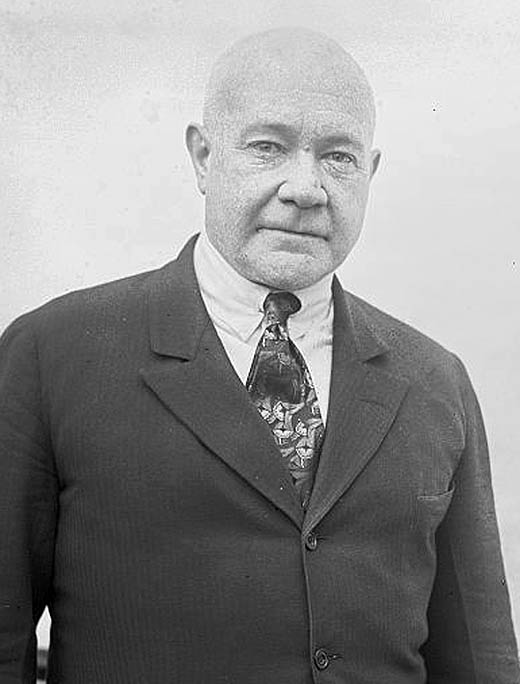
^{Library of Congress} Davis Elkins

In 1936, the Washington and Old Dominion Railroad, a new corporation that Davis Elkins (the son of Stephen Benton Elkins) had created, assumed operation of the remnants of the W&OD Railway, which consisted only of the Railway's Bluemont Division and the portion of the former Great Falls Division that had remained between Rosslyn and Thrifton (which was no longer a junction). They negotiated a new, cheaper lease with Southern Railway.

Shortly thereafter, in 1939, the railroad began to scale back. It abandoned the western end of its line which had connected the towns of Purcellville and Bluemont. This section had seen steep declines from passengers and from the closing of the flour mill in Round Hill and the railroad couldn't afford to repair the Round Hill trestle when it needed it. Service ended in February and the rails and electrical equipment were delivered to Southern as salvage. In the same year, the signature station in Rosslyn was torn down as part of a redesign of Rosslyn Circle necessitated by the extension of the George Washington Memorial Parkway beneath the Key Bridge. On April 12, 1941, it ended all passenger service, although freight and mail service continued.

The 1940s were a time of continued change for the W&OD. In 1941, not only did the railroad end passenger service (temporarily, as it would turn out), but it began to convert its operations from electric to diesel or gasoline power; a process that it completed in 1944. The retrenchment and diesels, coupled with growth in Arlington – and an accompanying increased demand for building supplies – led to, starting in 1940, the first profits in 28 years.

Mail service by trolley railway was unusual, and in 1941 it was believed to be the only trolley railway postal service east of the Mississippi. After some of the trolley wire had been removed in 1942 and sold as scrap to support the United States' World War II effort, the W&OD was forced in March 1943 to resume passenger service between Rosslyn and Leesburg to reduce the need for tires due to shortages caused by the war. After finding few riders, the railroad asked to discontinue passenger service in June, noting that it was using gasoline, which was also being curtailed for the war, but their request was denied.

In late 1943, the railroad leased a used Budd two-car streamlined gas-electric passenger train and in February 1944 expanded passenger service to Leesburg and Purcellville using gas–electric motor cars and cars pulled by diesel–electric locomotives. At first passenger demand was great enough to justify three round trips a day, but after the war ridership dropped and in 1950 it was scaled back. When the post office department canceled its mail service contract in 1951, the railroad stopped carrying both passengers and mail. The last passenger car ran on May 31, 1951; thereafter, the railroad carried only freight.

In 1945, the W&OD Railroad acquired ownership of the section of line between Potomac Yard and Purcellville that they had leased from the Southern Railway. The Southern Railway retained ownership of the easternmost section of the railroad's route, which still connected Potomac Yard to the Southern's freight and passenger stations in old town Alexandria.

==== Chesapeake and Ohio ownership ====
In 1956, believing that the Potomac Electric Power Company (PEPCO) would select a site near the W&OD's route in Sterling for a new coal-fired power plant, the Chesapeake and Ohio Railway (C&O) purchased the W&OD from Elkins, but did not change the railroad's name. However, PEPCO instead chose a site in Maryland for its power plant after the C&O had concluded the purchase.

In 1957, the W&OD's prospects improved with the construction of Dulles Airport, for which it had the nearest railhead. Between 1958 and 1960, thirteen bridges between Sterling and Potomac Yards, including the one at Difficult Run that dated back to 1884, were replaced with larger ones and worn-out rails and ties were replaced. In 1959, hauling traffic for both the construction of Dulles and the Capital Beltway the railroad had its most profitable year ever.

The 1960s were a decade of decline and closure for the W&OD as the Virginia highway department saw the right-of-way as potential highways and trucking continued to take away business. The highway department began negotiations to purchase the Rosslyn spur in 1960 and was trying to buy the mainline as early as 1962 for the construction of a road that was to become Interstate 66 (I-66). In July 1962, the highway department bought the Rosslyn spur for $900,000 and in September 1963, the railroad stopped operating to Rosslyn. The railroad then removed its tracks between Lacey (south of Washington Boulevard) and Rosslyn by November 1964.

=== Abandonment (1965–1968) ===
In February 1965, the Commonwealth of Virginia contracted to buy 30.5 miles (49.1 km) of the mainline between Herndon and Alexandria for $3.5 million. The C&O Railway then petitioned the Interstate Commerce Commission (ICC) for permission to abandon the railroad's remnant. The purchase would eliminate the need to build a grade separation where the railroad crossed the Henry G. Shirley Memorial Highway (now part of Interstate 395 (I-395)) at grade and at another grade separation for I-66. The purchase would also provide 1.5 miles (2.4 km) of right-of-way for I-66, saving the state $5 million.

Business interests in Loudoun County, the Arlington County Chamber of Commerce, various state, county and local officials, railway labor organizations and 21 of the 133 shippers who still used the railroad's freight service opposed the purchase. The Northern Virginia Transportation Commission (NVTC), which was interested in converting the line to a commuter rail service, also opposed the purchase. The Washington Metropolitan Area Transit Authority (WMATA), which at the time was planning to construct a rapid transit system for the Washington area, tried to postpone the abandonment in the hopes of using part of the right-of-way for transit.

The highway department simultaneously made plans to secretly sell all but 4 miles (6.4 km) of the route to the Virginia Electric and Power Company (VEPCO) (now Dominion Virginia Power), whose transmission lines were running along the railroad's right-of-way. In addition, the W&OD agreed to sell to VEPCO the remaining 17.5 miles (28.2 km) of right-of-way not purchased by the highway department. This included the 12 miles (19.3 km) north of Herndon, a 4-mile section at Vienna, one mile at the Alexandria end and two 1000 foot long sections at Sunset Hills and Falls Church. The sale would thus prevent the NVTC from buying the land for mass transit.

In August 1967, transit advocates led by Del. Clive L. DuVal II (Fairfax-Falls Church) and WMATA secured a 60-day postponement of the abandonment while they put together a plan to use the right-of-way for transit. However, according to WMATA general manager Jackson Graham, the estimated cost of using the full right-of-way for commuter rail was $70 million. Because WMATA did not expect the proposed transit line to be able to generate enough ridership to be cost-effective, WMATA rejected that option.

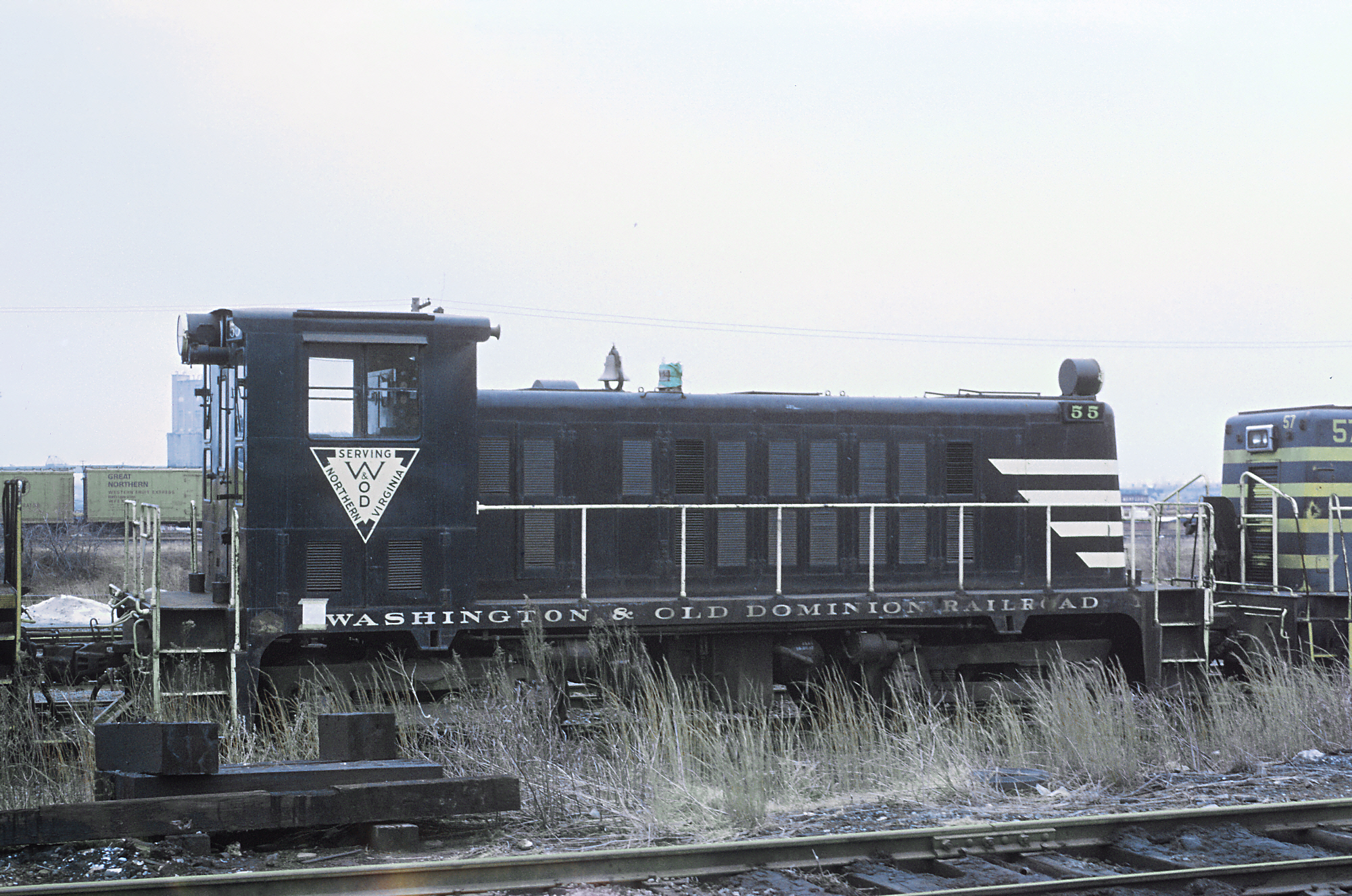
The former W&OD 55, a Whitcomb 75-ton diesel–electric switcher locomotive built in 1950, at the Baltimore and Ohio Railroad's Riverside Yard in Baltimore in January 1969.

On November 10, 1967, WMATA announced that it had come to an agreement with the highway department that would give WMATA a two–year option to buy a 5 miles (8.0 km) stretch of the right of way from Glebe Road (Virginia Route 120) to the Capital Beltway (now Interstate 495 (I-495)), where I-66 was to be built. WMATA would operate mass transit in the highway's median strip. WMATA would have a 2-year option to buy the 10 miles (16.1 km) of right-of-way from the Beltway to Herndon for the use of commuter trains, an option that WMATA did not exercise. A last minute offer to buy the railroad at its salvage cost and keep it running that the railroad's customers made was rejected in 1967.

In January 1968, the ICC decided to permit the C&O to abandon and sell its line and the railroad planned to run their last train on January 30, 1968. But a temporary restraining order kept the line open until the U.S. District Court in Alexandria sustained the decision in July setting the last for August 27, 1968. On the last day, B&O switcher 9155 pulled two empty lumber cars to Potomac Yard from the Murphy and Ames Lumber Company siding in Falls Church. On August 30, the railroad shipped its three diesel locomotives to the B&O's Baltimore engine terminal, from which a salvage dealer purchased them. In October 1968, the Virginia State Highway Department started condemnation proceedings to acquire the right-of-way, which was eventually donated to the state, where it crossed Shirley Highway. The section where it crossed the future Interstate 66 was also donated. The Northern Virginia Transportation Commission asked the ICC to reconsider its decision but in November 1968 it rejected that request.

=== Removal ===
After the W&OD stopped running passenger trains in 1951, the Dunn Loring station served as the town's post office, but was then torn down in 1963.

In 1969 the Leesburg Passenger Station suffered its 3rd fire and was destroyed.

By 1969, the C&O had removed all of its tracks and ties (the ties were sold in bundles of 25 for $75), except for some tracks that were crossing paved roads; and the County started covering those in late 1968. In April 1969, workers removed the W&OD Bridge over Route 1 in Alexandria. In late 1969, bulldozers started tearing up the right-of-way for construction of I-66 and the Metrorail line.

In August 1970, the 80 year old East Falls Church station, located south of the tracks on the west side of Washington Street/Lee Highway (now Langston Boulevard), was torn down also to make room for I-66 and the Metrorail line. The station was torn down piece by piece and given to Arthur Brown who moved it to Amissville, VA for use as a trading post. As of 1973 he had not reconstructed it because of uncertainty about widening US-211. Two older buildings that had served as the East Falls Church station had been removed from the site, reused and then eventually destroyed.

The bridge over U.S. Route 29 (Lee Highway at the time, renamed Langston Boulevard later) had been partially removed by early 1970 and the remainder removed by 1979.

The bridge over the Capital Beltway, built along with the beltway around 1963, was torn down in 1974 to accommodate Beltway widening.

== Legacy ==
In 1999, Virginia Department of Historic Resources staff determined that the "Washington and Old Dominion Railroad Historic District" was eligible for listing on the National Register of Historic Places (NRHP). A 2000 NRHP registration form states that the Historic District is eligible for the listing because the District "is associated with events that have made a significant contribution to the broad patterns of our history". The form contains an in-depth description of the District's historical resources and of the railroad's history, as well as maps that show the locations of the Districts's major historical features.

=== Park ===
Great Falls Park was eventually purchased by the Fairfax Park Authority in 1953 and in 1966 transferred to the National Park Service wherein it became a National Park.

=== Right-of-way ===
45 miles of the railroad's original 54 mile long, 100 foot wide Bluemont Division right-of-way remain today as the Washington and Old Dominion Railroad Regional Park, which features the W&OD Trail. With the exceptions of lands transferred to the Virginia Department of Highways, the land that lay west of the Alexandria/Arlington boundary was sold for $4.91 million to Virginia Electric and Power Company (VEPCO) (part of which was incorporated into Dominion Virginia Power in 2000) for power line right-of-way. In 1977 VEPCO agreed to sell their land to the Northern Virginia Regional Park Authority (NVRPA) (now NOVA Parks) for $3.6 million, retaining an easement for the power lines. The NVRPA completed the trail from Shirlington to Purcellville in 1988.

The Virginia highway department retained the section of the railroad's route that crossed the Henry G. Shirley Memorial Highway along the Arlington-Alexandria boundary and the portion of the route in Arlington immediately east of Falls Church. On the first they removed the at-grade crossing of Shirley Highway and on the latter it built I–66. WMATA then constructed a part of Washington Metro's Orange Line within the median strip of I-66 on that portion of the railroad's former route.

The right of way east of the Alexandria/Arlington boundary and west of Commonwealth Avenue fell into the hands of private developers, but east of Commonwealth it became the Mt. Jefferson Park and Greenway. Some of the rails were preserved in the Park's 2022-25 Greenway project and are integrated into the trail and park.

The western 11 miles of the 15-mile right-of-way of the Great Falls and Old Dominion Division became Old Dominion Drive. The easternmost 1.25 miles became part of I-66 and the 1.25 miles in between became part of Langston Drive.

The easternmost 1.25 miles of the Bluemont-Thrifton Division was also used to create I-66, the westernmost 1.4 miles was used to build the Bluemont Junction Trail and on the 1000 feet in between, the Ballston Wetland was built.

Scotland Heights Road west of Round Hill passes through the cut in rock at Scotland Gap made for the W&OD.

==== Bridges ====
The Bluemont line traveled along Four Mile Run on the east side and perpendicular to the flow of water on the west which resulted in numerous bridges. The bridge spans have all been removed, and in most cases replaced, but the bridge abutments and piers and stone arches remain.

The Bluemont Division connecting line had a bridge over the Fairfax line of the Washington, Arlington and Falls Church Electric railroad at what is now Fairfax Drive, but it was removed in 1974 as part of the construction of the Metrorail.

Abutments and piers exist at the numerous Four Mile Run crossings, Piney Branch, Difficult Run, Broad Run, Goose Creek, Sycolin Creek, Tuscarora Creek and Leesburg Town Branch and almost all cases a trail deck now extends across them. At Tuscarora, the trail runs alongside the piers and abutments crossing the creek on a low-water crossing. The longest and highest bridge is the one at Goose Creek. The stone abutments and piers date from the original pre-Civil War period of construction, but other components have been replaced several times, most recently in 1981 when the current bridge span was built.

Six stone arch bridges remain. They can be found at Clark's Gap, Sugarland Run, Piney Branch, Hamilton, Paeonian Springs and Four Mile Run. The oldest of these is the one at Sugarland Run that dates back to the original construction.

Additionally, abutments carrying an old road over the tracks can be found in Loudoun County between Crosstrail Boulevard and the access trail to Rhonda Place, SE.

==== Culverts ====
Numerous stone and cast iron culverts remain from the railroad along the right-of-way. These carry the trail over smaller streams and drainages. On the eastern side the culverts are more likely to have been replaced by modern culverts as part of modern storm water management efforts.

=== Tracks ===
Little, if any, of the track or ballast remain. When the railroad ceased operation most of the track was removed. Some may survive at intersections where the rails would be found under the road pavement. Portions of track were visible near the W&OD Trail's crossing of Ruritan Circle (VA Route 859) in Sterling during 2023.

One exception is the spur from the CSX mainline at the Slater's Lane Interlocking in Northeast Alexandria to the old Potomac River Generating Station site along the Alexandria Waterfront. The track was used by the plant until late 2013 when the plant's switcher was hauled away because the power plant was closed and being redeveloped. The tracks continued to be used for a short time after that by the Robinson Terminal, but that too was closed after it was sold for redevelopment in late 2013. The last train ran sometime in late 2013 or early 2014. For now, the tracks remain all the way to N.Union Street, but as part of the power plant redevelopment plan, the tracks between Abingdon Drive and 3rd Street will be removed to create a linear park. A siding track to the power plant was removed in 2021–2022.

==== Coal Trestle ====
Part of Benjamin Elliott's Coal Trestle remains in East Falls Church. Elliott constructed the trestle in 1926 to allow coal-filled train cars to transfer coal to trucks for delivery to customers. The structure remained in use until the railroad was abandoned in 1968. In 2014, a developer removed about a quarter of the trestle structure, but the remainder is still standing on NOVA Parks property.

=== Stations ===
Nine stations or depots, and one grain elevator remain today:

Vienna has the easternmost surviving station which dates back until before the Civil War. Located at the center of Ayr Hill and Dominion Roads, the Vienna Train Depot has served as the home of the Northern Virginia Model Railroaders Club since 1975.

The Sunset Hills (or Wiehle) Station survives just east of Reston Parkway. It served for some time after the railroad ended operations as a ranger station for the nearby park, but is currently unused.

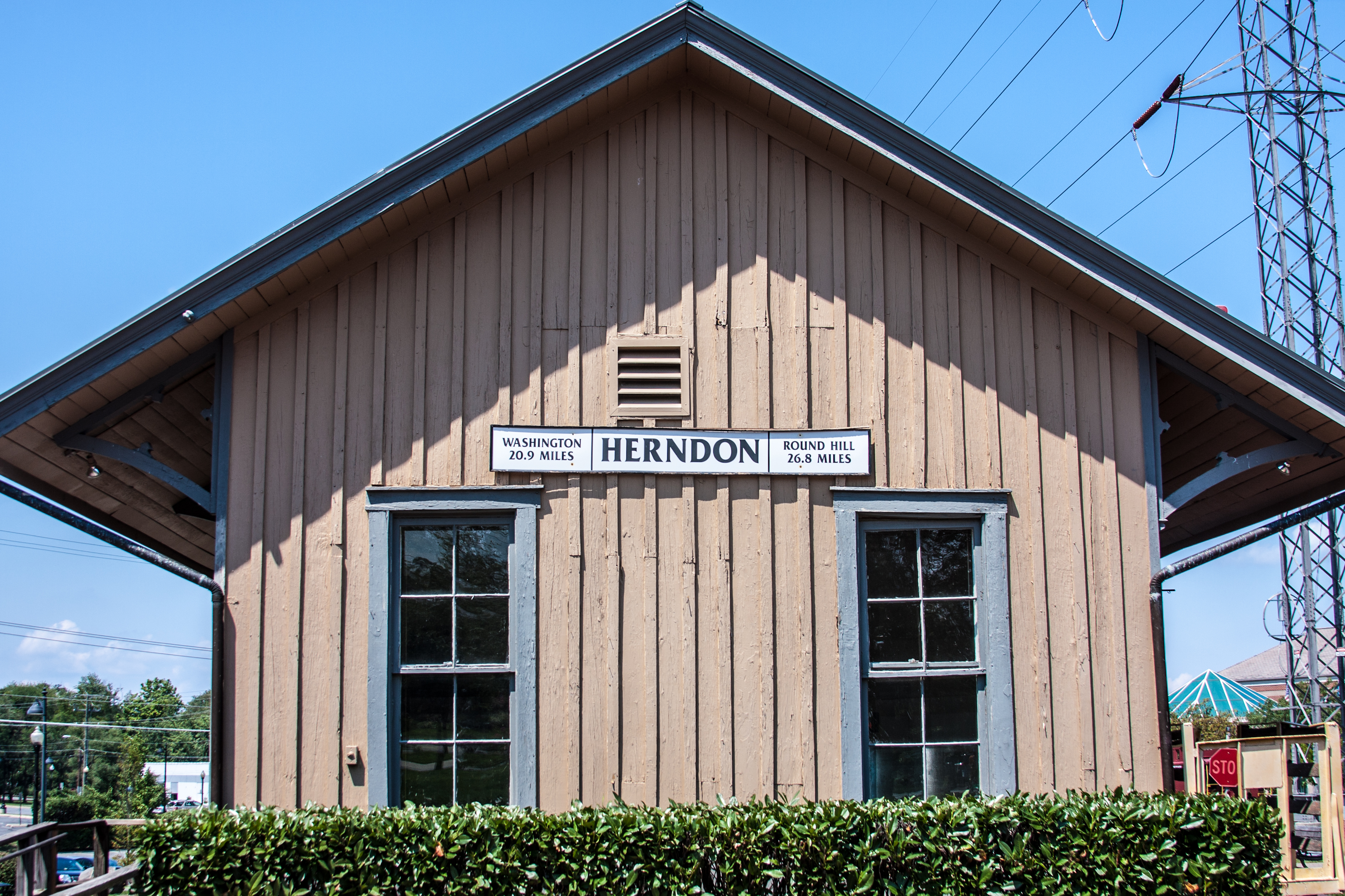
Herndon Depot, August 2012

The Herndon depot survives as a museum. It was built prior to 1857, but did not reach its current form until around 1881. On June 18, 1979, the Heritage Conservation and Recreation Service of the United States Department of the Interior added it to the NRHP.

The Leesburg Freight House was moved two blocks north to 201 Harrison Street in 1984. The building houses a pizza restaurant.

The Paeonian Springs Shelter originally stood at the site of railroad's earlier Clark's Gap station. After the railroad closed, the NVRPA installed the shelter at the site of the Paeonian Springs station, which had burned in 1941.

The Hamilton Station was built in 1870 and has an old grain mill next to it.

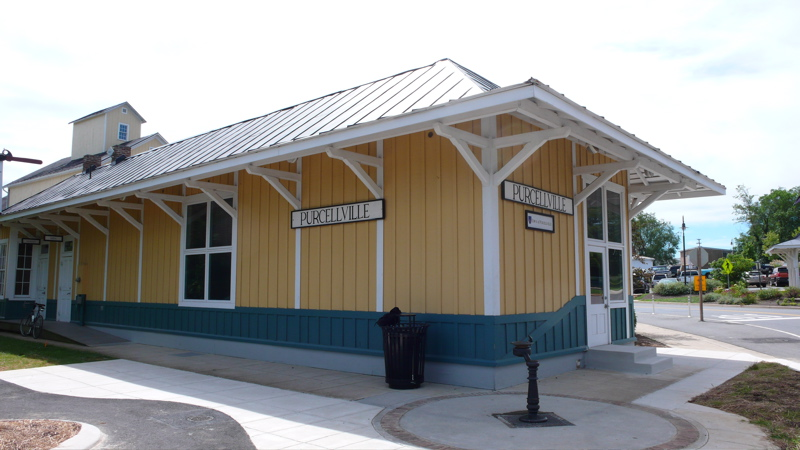
Purcellville Station, August 2008

The Purcellville train station was built around 1903–1904. It was purchased by the Purcellville Preservation Association (PPA) in June 1993 and subsequently restored in 1998–2002. It serves trail users as a rest stop and community members as meeting space. It was added to the NRHP On May 28, 2010, by the National Park Service to the NRHP. The Virginia Department of Historic Resources has added both it and the Herndon Station to the Virginia Landmarks Register.

The Round Hill freight depot at 34 Main Street in Round Hill, built in 1890, was recently restored and turned into a 3-bedroom cottage, but has served for a home for several decades. Across the street is the restored Round Hill Passenger Station which is also a personal residence.

The Bluemont station burned down in 1920, but the grain elevator was left standing (and later built taller to serve as cell phone tower). A scaled-down replica of the old station was built at the foot of the grain elevator.

== Bluemont Division, Alexandria-Bluemont line ==
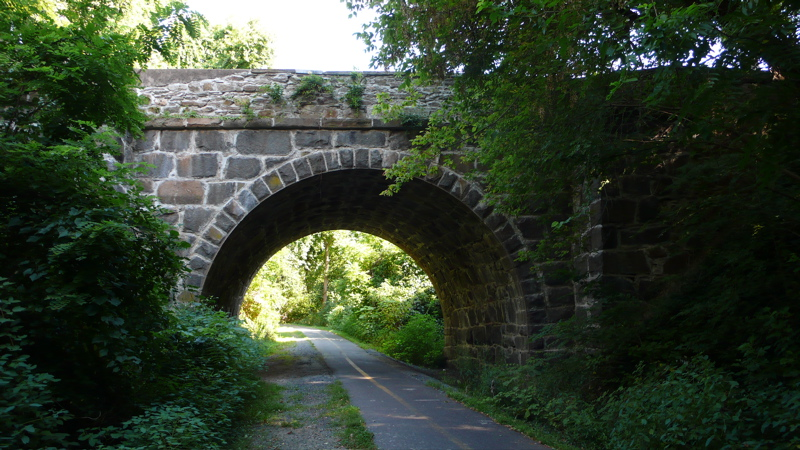
Stone arch at Clarke's Gap, August 2008

After the W&OD Railroad closed, the Southern Railway and its successor, the Norfolk Southern Railway, operated a spur between the Alexandria waterfront and a north–south route that traveled through Potomac Yard before the Yard closed in 1989. The spur formerly served trains traveling from the eastern end of the Bluemont Division to the Southern Railway's freight and passenger stations in old town Alexandria. As the Southern Railway owned and operated the spur and the stations, this section of track remained in operation after the W&OD closed. Railroad operations ended on the spur in 2012–2013 when GenOn Energy's Potomac River Generating Station and the Robinson Terminal's Oronoco Street warehouse closed.

A paved trail in Alexandria's linear Mt. Jefferson Park has replaced part of the Bluemont Division's course through that city. NOVA Parks' 44.6-mile-long (71.8 km) W&OD Trail travels in the Washington and Old Dominion Railroad Regional Park within the Bluemont Division's former right-of-way from the Alexandria/Arlington boundary through Bluemont Junction to Purcellville. The section of the Bluemont Division between Purcellville and Bluemont has not become a part of any trail, as the W&OD Railroad abandoned this section in 1938, thirty years before the remainder of its line closed.

Until 2023 some of the warehouses along the old W&OD in Alexandria (between Calvert and Swann) that were built to be serviced by it – with doors that opened toward the railroad – remained, but they were torn down to make room for the Del Ray Corner development.

=== Proposed future use ===
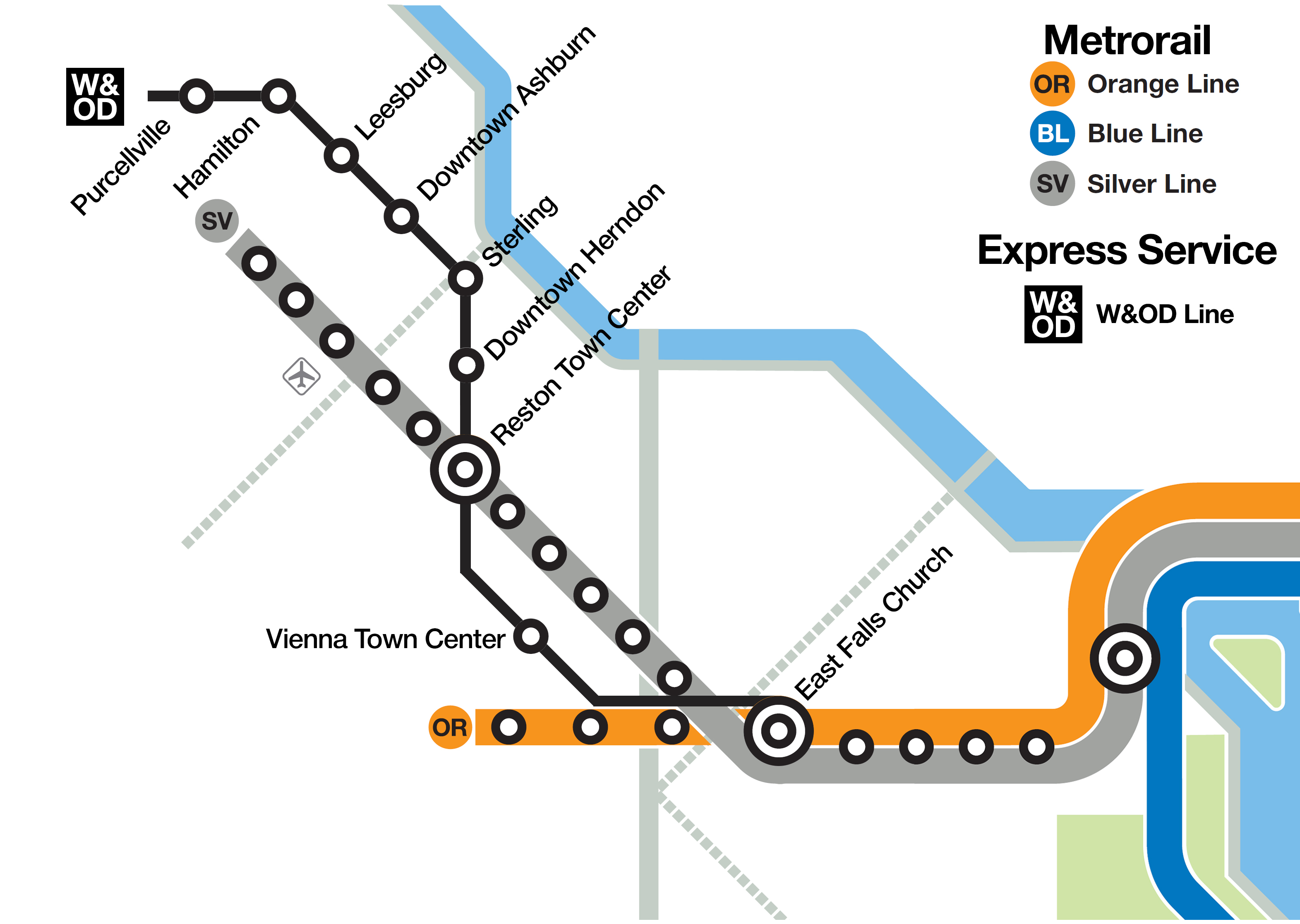
Stylized map of NOVA-TRAC's W&OD commuter rail proposal

The advocacy group NOVA-TRAC has proposed utilizing a portion of the Bluemont Division's former right-of-way to construct a commuter rail line from Purcellville and Leesburg to WMATA's East Falls Church Metro station, where riders can transfer to the Orange and Silver lines to continue their trip. They argue that the East Falls Church terminus reduces construction costs versus a direct route to Washington, D.C. The group has formed a coalition of businesses, nonprofits and community organizations that support the project.

The Hamilton town council voted to support NOVA-TRAC's plan on February 10, 2025. The council passed a resolution that supports studying the use of the W&OD rail trail corridor for rapid transit.

== Great Falls Division ==
In 1906, the 15-mile electrified Great Falls and Old Dominion Railroad (GF&OD) began operating from Georgetown in Washington, D.C. to the present site of Great Falls Park in Virginia. From Georgetown, the railroad crossed the Potomac River on the old Aqueduct Bridge to Rosslyn in Arlington. From Rosslyn, the railroad traveled northwest along the later routes of Lee Highway (U.S. Route 29) and Old Dominion Drive (Virginia State Route 309) until it reached Great Falls. In 1912, the GF&OD became the Great Falls Division of the W&OD, sharing trackage with the W&OD's Bluemont Division between Rosslyn and Thrifton Junction.

== Thrifton-Bluemont Junction connecting line ==
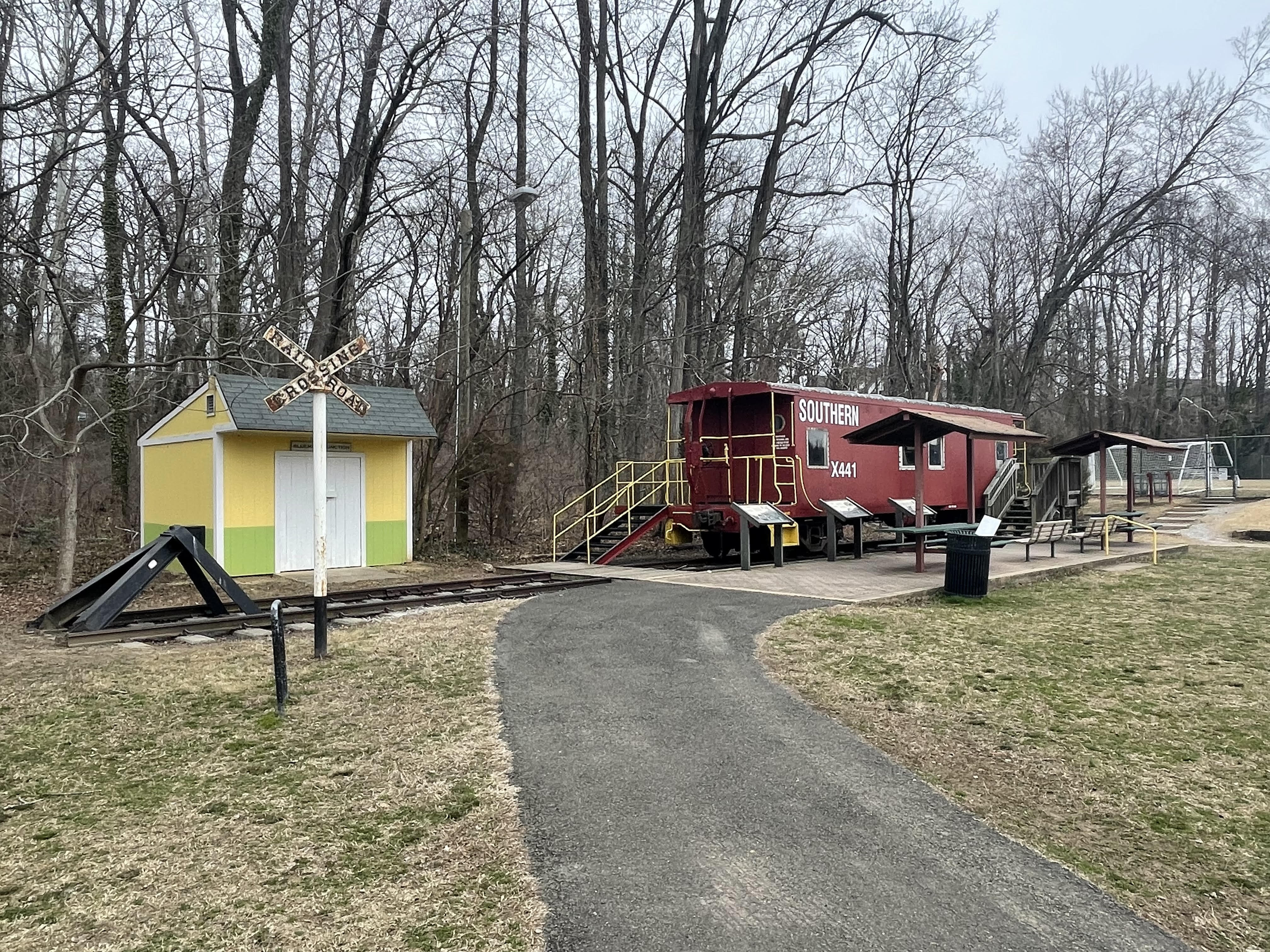
Bluemont Junction Park (February 2024)

The Thrifton-Bluemont Junction connecting line, a component of the W&OD's Bluemont Division, opened in 1912. The line connected the W&OD's Great Falls Division (formerly the Great Falls and Old Dominion Railroad) with the Bluemont Division's Alexandria-Bluemont line. The line closed in sections in 1963 and 1968. I–66 and the adjacent Custis Trail replaced the line between Thrifton and Washington Boulevard in Ballston. Arlington County's Bluemont Junction Trail replaced the line between Washington Boulevard and Bluemont Junction, where the Bluemont Junction Trail now meets the W&OD Trail in Bluemont Junction Park. The park presently contains an Arlington County railroad display that features a retired Southern Railway bay window caboose (Number X441). The caboose was built in 1971, three years after the W&OD Railroad closed.

== Surviving locomotives ==
At least four locomotives that the W&OD had owned or leased still survived in 2020.

- B&O 8413, a General Motors' (GM) Electro-Motive Corporation (later part of GM's Electro-Motive Division (EMD)) SW1 diesel–electric switcher locomotive assembled in 1940 with construction number 1111, was one of the first SW1s that Electro-Motive built. After acquisition, the Baltimore and Ohio Railroad (B&O) initially numbered the locomotive as 213, but subsequently changed the number to 8413. Leased by the W&OD in 1968, B&O #8413 was one of the last locomotives to operate on the W&OD before the railroad closed during the same year. After four transfers of ownership, Cargill purchased the locomotive, which became Cargill #6751.

Cargill moved the locomotive to Ogden, Utah, in 1993 for use in the company's Globe Mill. Following Cargill's donation of the locomotive in 2010, the Utah Central Railway and the Union Pacific Railroad delivered it to the Utah State Railroad Museum at Ogden's Union Station on May 21, 2011, where it was photographed in 2020.

- C&O 5015 is an American Locomotive Company (ALCO) S-2 diesel–electric switcher locomotive that the W&OD leased from the C&O. Built in 1946 with a 1000-horsepower engine, the locomotive was used during the W&OD's final decade of operations. After serving five more railroads, the locomotive became Columbia & Reading Railway #2-26 in 2009. It was operating in Columbia, Pennsylvania, on that line as CORY 2–26 in 2020.
- W&OD 47, a General Electric (GE) 44-ton centercab switcher, built and delivered to the W&OD in December 1941 with construction number 15041 and a 380-horsepower engine, was the railroad's first diesel–electric locomotive. It was joined by the similar #48 and #49, both built in August 1942. Sold to the Fonda, Johnstown & Gloversville Railroad in 1950 and renumbered to 30, the former W&OD 47 went to Cargill in Houston, Texas in 1967. Cargill subsequently reassigned it to Denver, Colorado. After serving on the Great Western Railway of Colorado as #44, the locomotive retained its number when it became the Burlington Junction Railway's (BJRY's) first when the BJRY opened in 1985. BJRY 44 subsequently operated in Mount Pleasant, West Burlington and Burlington, Iowa. The locomotive was photographed in Burlington during 2018 and in West Burlington during 2021 and 2025.

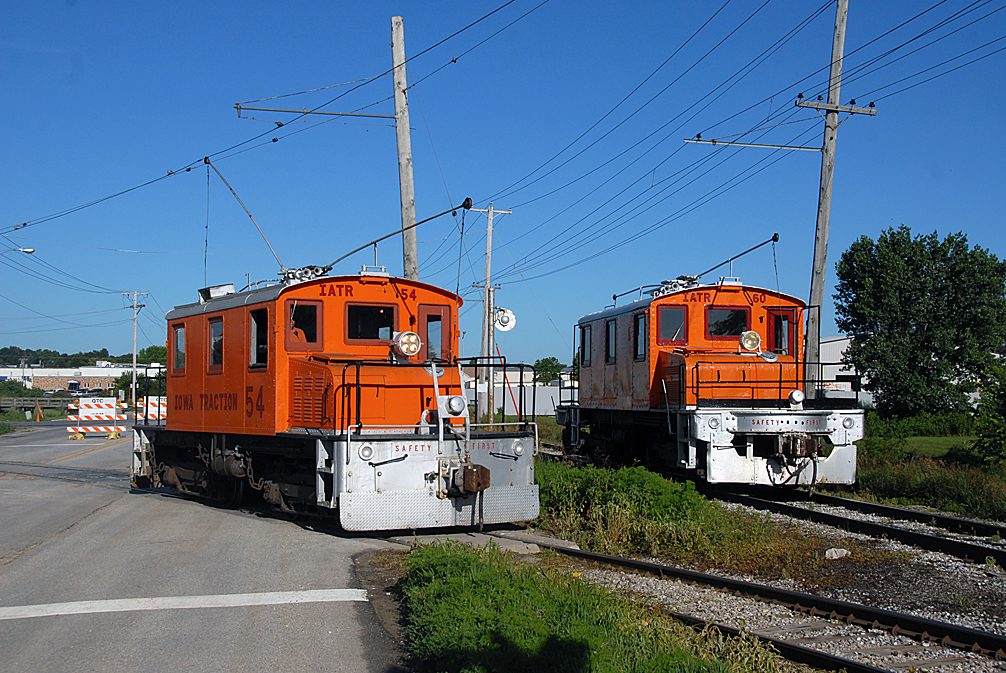
IATR 50 (former W&OD 50) and IATR 54 in Mason City, Iowa, in 2009

- W&OD 50 is a 50-ton steeplecab Baldwin-Westinghouse electric locomotive built in October 1920 with four Westinghouse type 562-D-5 100 horsepower motors as Baldwin Locomotive Works (BLW) serial number 53784 and brought to the W&OD Railway during the same year. After retiring the locomotive in 1945, the W&OD Railroad sold it in 1947 to the Cedar Rapids & Iowa City Railway, which renumbered it to 58. In 1955 it was sold to the Kansas City, Kaw Valley & Western Railway as #507. It was sold in 1962 to the Iowa Terminal Railroad and renumbered to 53, later becoming #50 of the Iowa Traction Railroad in 1987. Upon purchase in October 2012, the line was renamed to the Iowa Traction Railway. A 2021 video showed IATR 50 operating in Mason City, Iowa. The locomotive was photographed in Mason City while pulling a train of hopper cars in 2024, its 104th year.

In addition, at least one of the old Autorailer may still exist.

- The W&OD purchased several Evans Autorailer buses from the defunct Arlington & Fairfax Auto Railway. #109 was acquired by the Chicago, South Shore & South Bend RR in 1955 and equipped with a platform on the roof for working on the overhead wires in East Chicago, IN. Sometime in the 1950s it was sold to the Grasse River Railroad in New York. Sometime after the GRR went under in 1959, it passed into private ownership and was stored at Clark's Trading Post in Lincoln, New Hampshire. It is the last known, remaining piece of rolling stock from the Washington-Virginia streetcars, but it had not been maintained and stored outside for 60+ years. In August 2024, it was announced that the National Capital Trolley Museum in Colesville, Maryland had acquired the rare vehicle, and transported it to interim off-site storage. On November 10, 2024, the Autorailer touched live rail for the first time in more than 60 years and is now on display, awaiting restoration.

== See also ==
- Great Falls and Old Dominion Railroad
- Northern Virginia trolleys
- Virginia Creeper Trail
