= Paeonian Springs, Virginia =

Unincorporated community in Virginia, United States

- Unincorporated community
- Location within Northern Virginia Location within Virginia Location within the United States
- Coordinates: 39°8′57″N 77°37′9″W
- Country: United States
- State: Virginia
- County: Loudoun
- Elevation: 561 ft (171 m)
- Time zone: UTC−5 (Eastern (EST))
  - Summer (DST): UTC−4 (EDT)
- GNIS feature ID: 1499832

Paeonian Springs is an unincorporated community in Loudoun County, Virginia, United States. It is located at the intersection of the Charles Town Pike (State Route 9) and the Harry Byrd Highway (State Route 7). Paeonian Springs was established in 1890 and is currently served by a post office. The town is named after Paean, the Ancient Greek physician of the gods.

The Paeonian Springs Historic District was listed on the National Register of Historic Places in 2006.

== History ==
Developers began construction of the town in 1871 and the town was established in 1890. It was originally developed as a resort town for citizens of Washington, D.C. trying to escape the city in the summer. When developers advertised the town upon its completion they said it had "excellent water, mountain air and magnificent scenery".

The Washington & Ohio railroad (later renamed Washington & Old Dominion) played an integral role in the town's development for its first 50 years, making eight stops in the town every day.

By 1901 the town had three hotels, a downtown area, and a village green. By 1912, it also had a boardwalk, a church, and two private schools, among numerous other new shops.

Beginning in 1920, though the town started to decline. This happened for a number of reasons including: the loss of the boardwalk, mill, and church; the Pure Food and Drug Act's passage; and the discovery of antibiotics.

The Washington & Old Dominion railroad ended service in 1968. Twenty years later in 1988, the Washington and Old Dominion Trail, built on the old railroad's right-of-way, was extended through Paeonian Springs to Purcellville.
