= Rich Bottom Farm =

Historic house in Virginia, United States

- U.S. National Register of Historic Places
- Virginia Landmarks Register
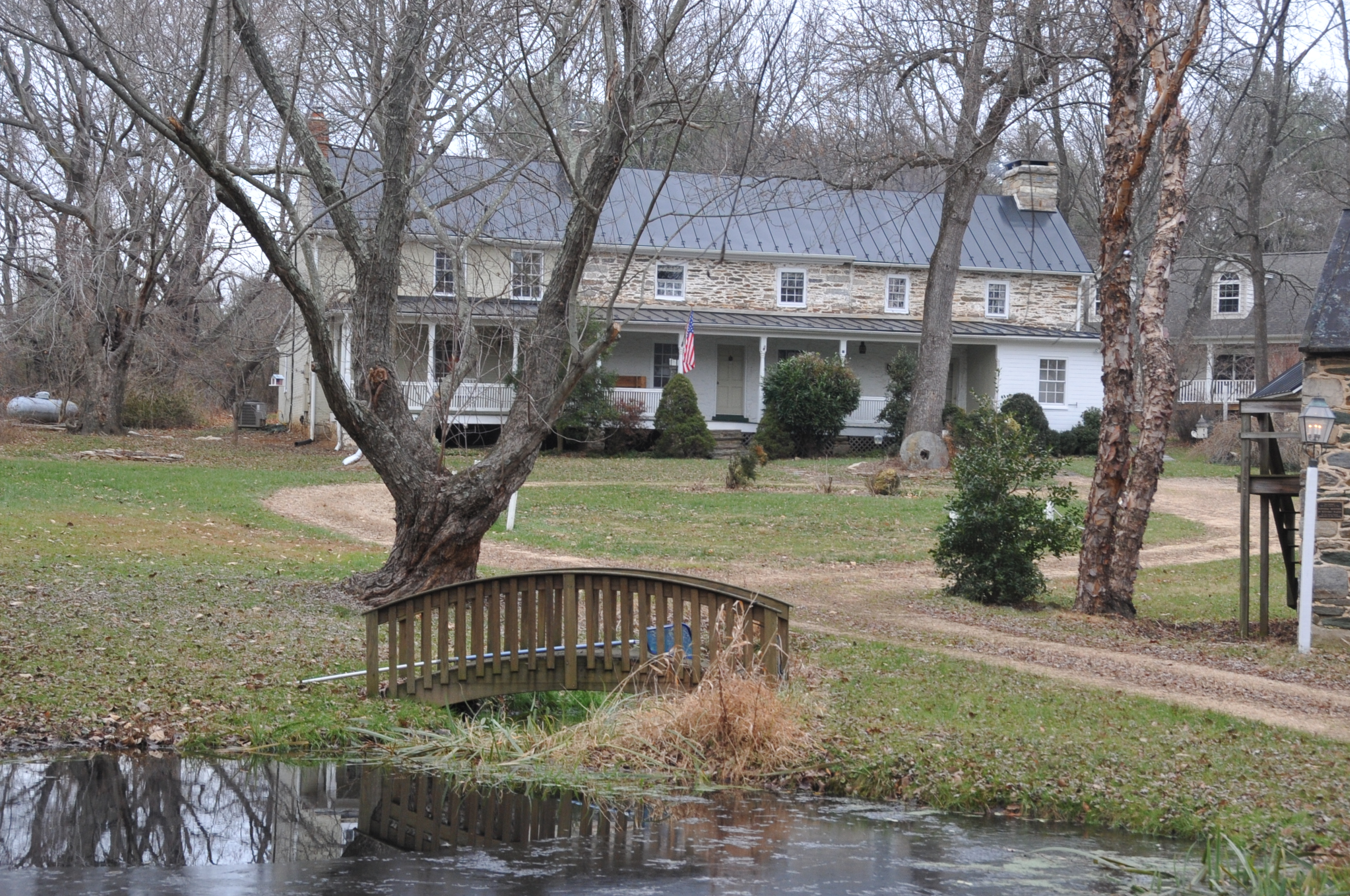

- Location within Northern Virginia Location within Virginia Location within the United States
- Location: 16860 Hillsboro Rd., 1.5 miles (2.4 km) north of Purcellville, Purcellville, Virginia
- Coordinates: 39°08′59″N 77°44′01″W
- Area: 10 acres (4.0 ha)
- Built: c. 1780–1820
- Architectural style: Federal
- NRHP reference No.: 97000156
- VLR No.: 053-0422

Significant dates
- Added to NRHP: February 21, 1997
- Designated VLR: December 4, 1996

Rich Bottom Farm is a historic home located near Purcellville, Loudoun County, Virginia. The house was built in three sections between about 1780 and 1820. It is a two-story, limestone and brick structure with a side gable roof in the Federal style. The front facade features an eight bay, full-width frame porch. Also on the property are the contributing two-story limestone spring house and limestone smokehouse.

It was listed on the National Register of Historic Places in 1997.
