= Purcellville Historic District =

Historic district in Virginia, United States

- U.S. National Register of Historic Places
- U.S. Historic district
- Virginia Landmarks Register
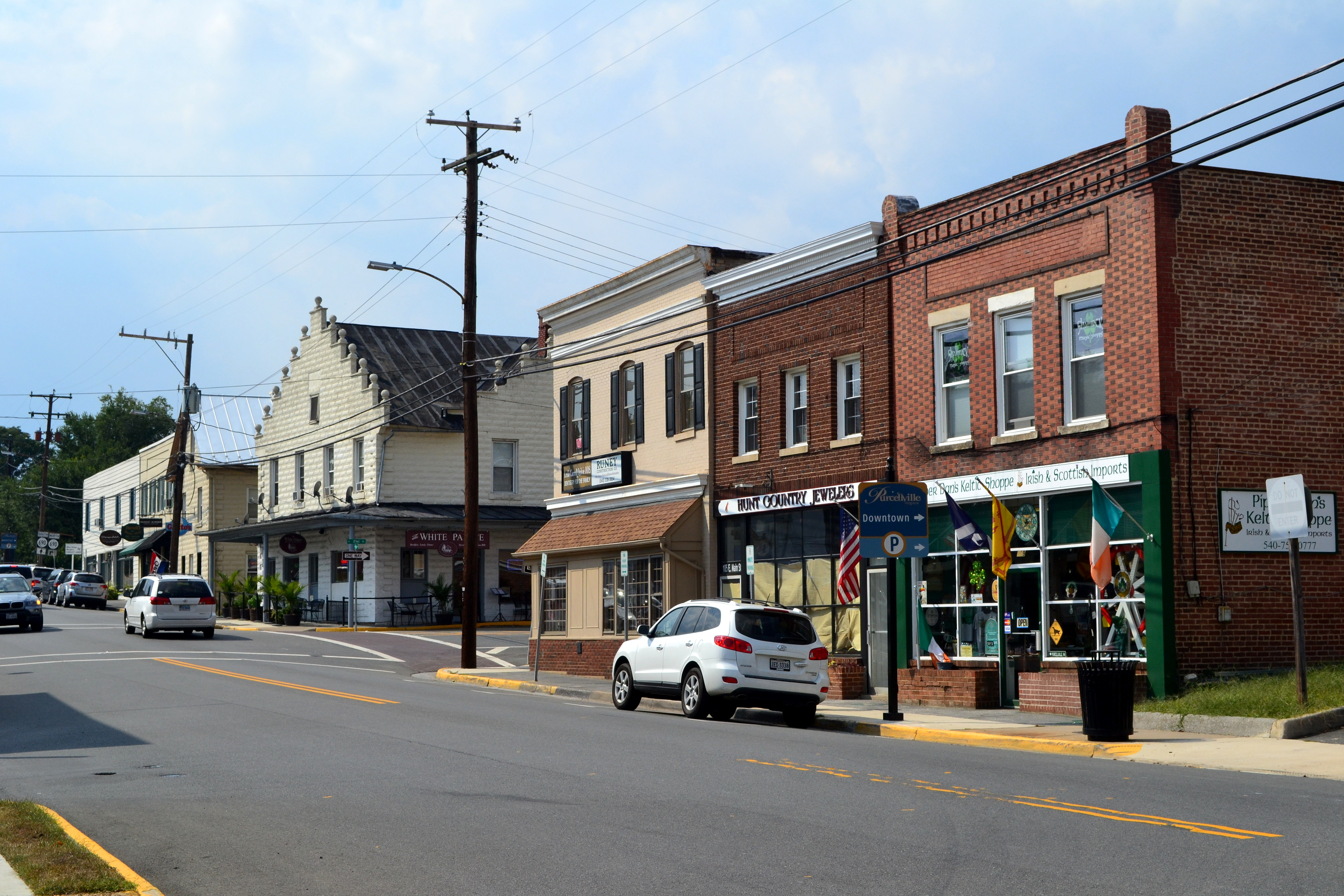

- Location within Northern Virginia Location within Virginia Location within the United States
- Location: Roughly bounded by W&OD Trail, S. 32nd St., W. F and E. G Sts., and Maple Ave., Purcellville, Virginia
- Coordinates: 39°8′52″N 77°37′8″W
- Area: 293 acres (119 ha)
- Built: 1835
- Architect: Simpson, Arch; et al.
- Architectural style: Late Victorian, Late 19th And Early 20th Century American Movements
- NRHP reference No.: 07000277
- VLR No.: 286-5001

Significant dates
- Added to NRHP: April 4, 2007
- Designated VLR: December 6, 2006

Purcellville Historic District is a national historic district located at Purcellville, Loudoun County, Virginia. It encompasses 490 contributing buildings and 8 contributing structures in the central business district and surrounding residential areas in the town of Purcellville. The buildings represents a range of architectural styles popular during the 19th and 20th centuries in rural Virginia. Notable buildings include the former Purcellville School, Purcell House and Store, Bethany United Methodist Church, St. Francis de Sales Catholic Church, Purcellville National Bank (1915), Town Hall (1908), and Asa Moore Janney House (late 1840s). The Bush Meeting Tabernacle is located in the district and separately listed.

It was listed on the National Register of Historic Places in 2007.
