= Purcellville Train Station =

- U.S. National Register of Historic Places
- Virginia Landmarks Register
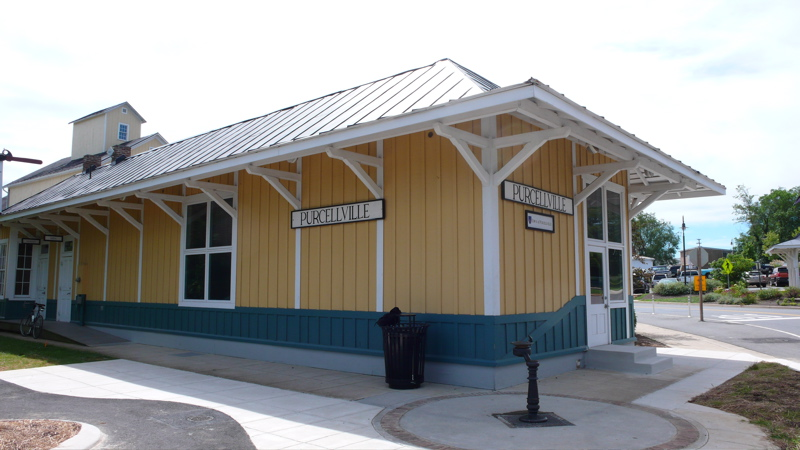
- Purcellville Train Station, August 2008

- Location within Northern Virginia Location within Virginia Location within the United States
- Location: 200 N 21st St, Purcellville, Virginia
- Coordinates: 39.13848°N 77.71616°W
- Area: 0.1 acres (0.040 ha)
- Built: 1904
- Architectural style: board and batten vernacular
- NRHP reference No.: 10000307
- VLR No.: 286-5001-0233

Significant dates
- Added to NRHP: May 28, 2010
- Designated VLR: March 18, 2010

Purcellville Train Station is a historic railway station located in Purcellville, Loudoun County, Virginia. The station is adjacent to the Washington and Old Dominion Railroad Trail (W&OD Trail). The Southern Railway constructed the station in 1904. The station is a one-story, rectangular frame building with a hipped roof and deeply overhanging eaves supported by triangular knee braces. It was a station on the Washington and Old Dominion Railway and later, the Washington and Old Dominion Railroad from 1912 until the line closed in 1968, with passenger service ceasing in 1951.

The Purcellville Preservation Association restored the station in 2002. The town of Purcellville maintains the station as a public meeting facility and public restrooms, under the purview of the town's Train Station Steering & Oversight Committee. A Loudoun visitors center within the station contains a W&OD Railroad historical display and hosts wine-tasting events. The visitors center is open from noon to 4:00 p.m. on Saturdays and Sundays from late April through October. The National Park Service added the station to the National Register of Historic Places on May 28, 2010.
