= Paeonian Springs Historic District =

Historic district in Virginia, United States

- U.S. National Register of Historic Places
- U.S. Historic district
- Virginia Landmarks Register
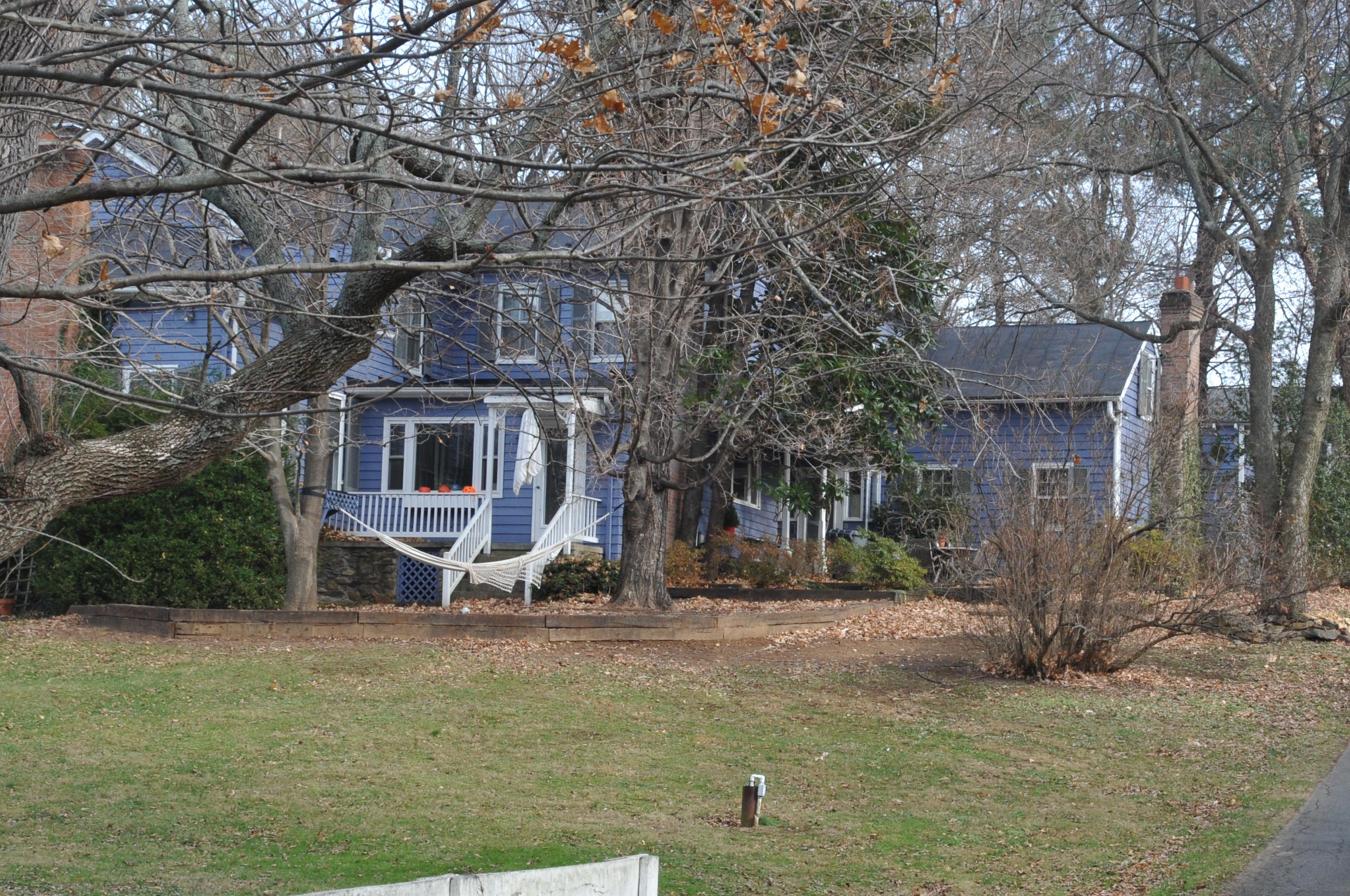
- Chanbourne

- Location within Northern Virginia Location within Virginia Location within the United States
- Location: Area inc. parts of Berry Bramble Ln., Catoctin Ridge St., Charles Town Pike, Highland Circle, and Simpson Circle, Paeonian Springs, Virginia
- Coordinates: 39°8′52″N 77°37′8″W
- Area: 47 acres (19 ha)
- Built: 1890
- Architectural style: Late Victorian, Late 19th And 20th Century Revivals
- NRHP reference No.: 06000352
- VLR No.: 053-5072

Significant dates
- Added to NRHP: May 1, 2006
- Designated VLR: March 8, 2006, September 9, 2008

Paeonian Springs Historic District is a national historic district located at Paeonian Springs, Loudoun County, Virginia. It encompasses 58 contributing buildings, 1 contributing site, and 1 contributing structure in the village of Paeonian Springs. It is primarily residential, but also includes several former commercial buildings, two former boardinghouses, a former school and private academy, the former water bottling plant, as well as the former public springhouse and spring site. The majority of the dwellings range in date from about 1880 to 1910. Notable buildings include Chanbourne, Buckhill III, Vanderventer Inn, Shiflett House, and the former Spinks Mercantile (c. 1905).

It was listed on the National Register of Historic Places in 2006.
