= Tabernacle-Fireman's Field =

Historic meeting site in Virginia

- The Tabernacle-Fireman's Field
- U.S. National Register of Historic Places
- U.S. Historic district – Contributing property
- Virginia Landmarks Register
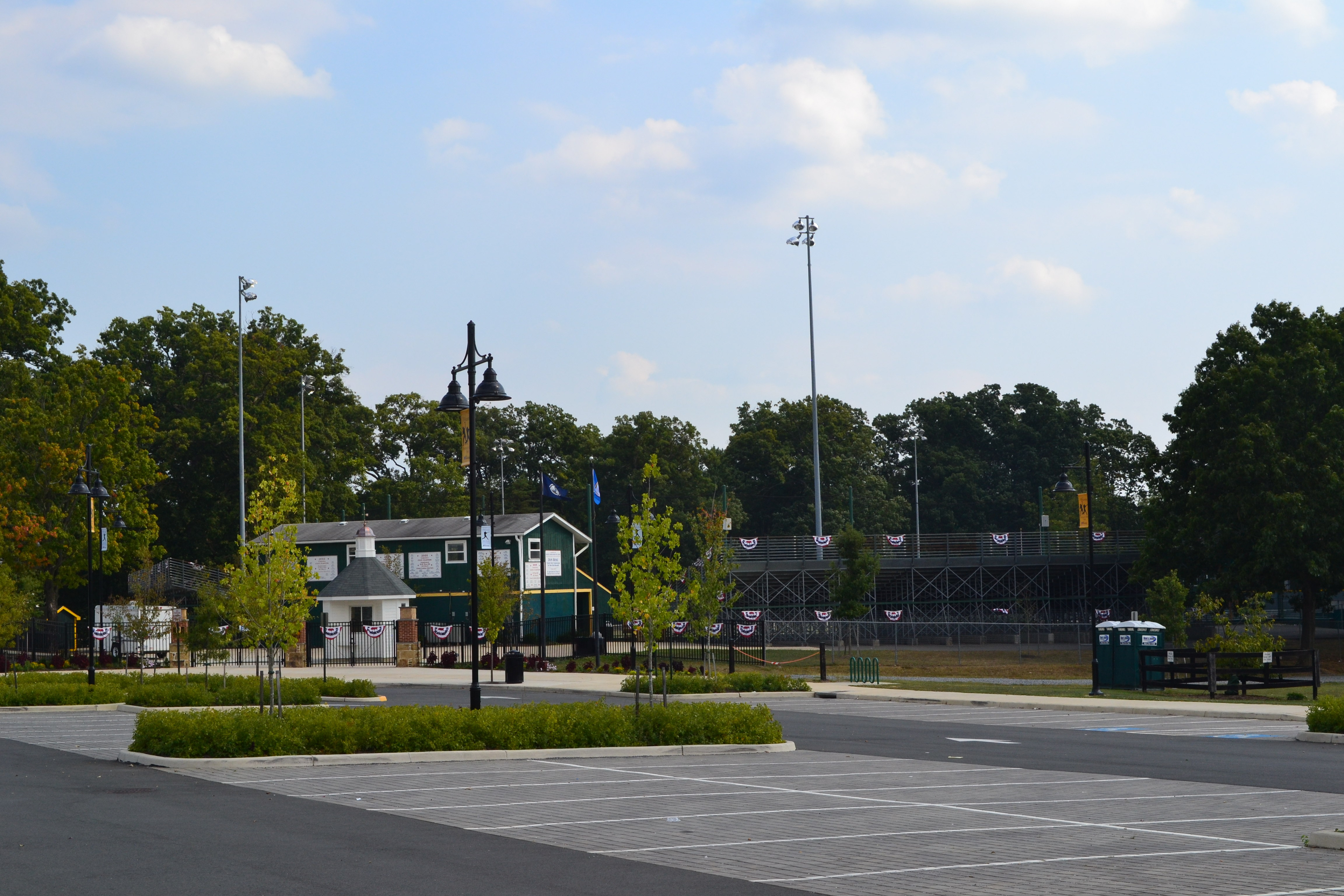

- Location within Northern Virginia Location within Virginia Location within the United States
- Location: 250 South Nursery Ave, Purcellville, Virginia
- Coordinates: 39°7′59″N 77°42′55″W
- Area: 16 acres (6.5 ha)
- Built: 1903, 1939, 1951
- NRHP reference No.: 10000308
- VLR No.: 286-5007

Significant dates
- Added to NRHP: February 22, 2011
- Designated VLR: March 18, 2010

The Tabernacle-Fireman's Field is a historic meeting site and picnic grounds located at Purcellville, Loudoun County, Virginia, US. It is an eight-sided, frame building measuring approximately 80 feet by 160 feet. It was originally built to house the "Bush Meetings" that were conducted by the Prohibition and Evangelical Association of Loudoun County, Virginia. The 8,500 square foot building could accommodate 3,000 seats. In 1939, it was converted into a skating roller rink, a function it has continued to serve. It closed temporarily in 2009 but reopened a year later. Also on the property are two contributing barbeque pits and a picnic pavilion. Fireman's Field, which serves as the home to the Purcellville Cannons of the Valley Baseball League, is on the property as well.

It was listed on the National Register of Historic Places in 2010. It is located in the Purcellville Historic District.
