= Locust Grove (Purcellville, Virginia) =

Historic house in Virginia, United States

- U.S. National Register of Historic Places
- Virginia Landmarks Register
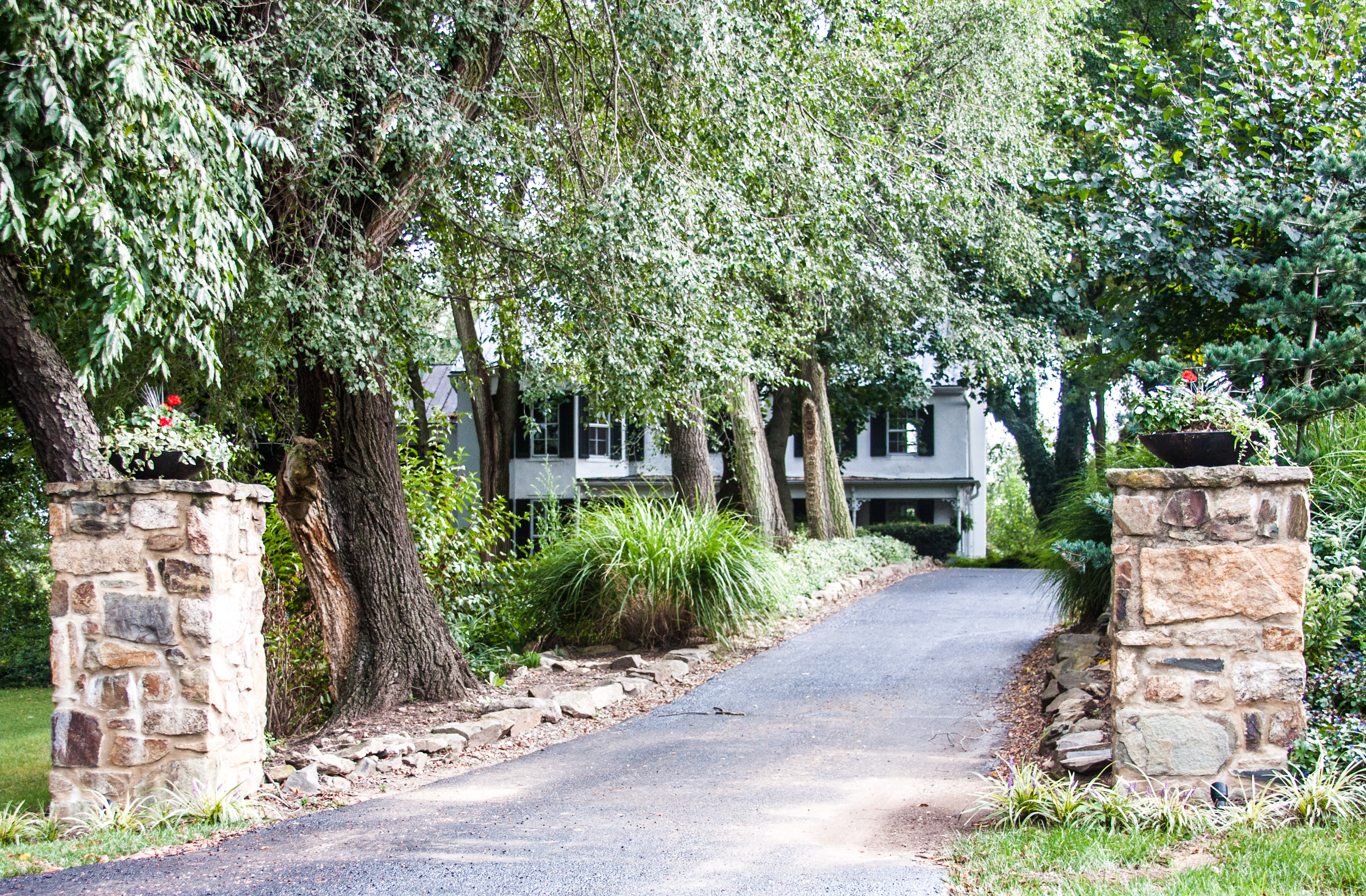
- Locust Grove, September 2012

- Location within Northern Virginia Location within Virginia Location within the United States
- Location: 200 Locust Grove Dr., Purcellville, Virginia
- Coordinates: 39°7′59″N 77°42′57″W
- Area: 3 acres (1.2 ha)
- Built: c. 1817, 1837
- Architectural style: Federal, Greek Revival
- NRHP reference No.: 07000083
- VLR No.: 286-5017

Significant dates
- Added to NRHP: February 21, 2007
- Designated VLR: September 6, 2006

Locust Grove is a historic home located at Purcellville, Loudoun County, Virginia. The house was built in two phases, one before 1817 and another in 1837. The original section is a single-pile, two-story structure built of fieldstone with a side gable roof in the Federal style. Attached to it is the later 2 1/2-story, three-bay, double-pile, fieldstone addition. The interior features Federal and Greek Revival style decorative details. Also on the property are the contributing stone spring house, a frame barn, a garage, a stone watering trough, and a stone chimney.

It was listed on the National Register of Historic Places in 2007.
