= Robinson Terminal =

Warehouse and logistics company in Virginia

Coordinates: 38.79720°N 77.18580°W

Robinson Terminal Warehouse LLC
- Type: Private
- Industry: Warehousing · Logistics · Freight Handling
- Founded: 1939
- Founder: Clarence J. Robinson
- Headquarters: 6880 Commercial Dr, Springfield, VA 22151, U.S., Springfield, Virginia, United States
- Key people: Donald E. Graham (former owner under The Washington Post Co.)
- Products: Freight logistics · Newsprint warehousing · Port operations
- Owner: Nash Holdings LLC (since 2013)
- Website: www.robinsonterminal.com

Robinson Terminal Warehouse LLC is a warehouse and logistics company operating in Springfield, Virginia, and formerly along the Potomac River in Alexandria, Virginia. Founded in 1939 by Clarence J. Robinson, the company served as the longtime freight handler for The Washington Post, which owned it until 2013.

== Operations ==
Robinson Terminal formerly operated two deep-water berths at the ends of Duke and Oronoco Streets in Old Town Alexandria. These terminals received large shipments of newsprint, often requiring drawspan openings at the Woodrow Wilson Bridge.

Both waterfront terminals were sold in 2013 to Nash Holdings, a company owned by Jeff Bezos.

== Current facilities ==
Robinson Terminal continues to operate warehouse sites in Springfield, Virginia, including its headquarters at 6880 Commercial Drive, adjacent to I-495 and served by Norfolk Southern Railway.

A previous warehouse was also located at the former Washington Post printing plant in College Park, Maryland, now owned by the University of Maryland.

== Founder ==
The company was founded by Clarence J. Robinson, an entrepreneur and philanthropist. His papers are archived at George Mason University.
