= Purcellville, Virginia =

Town in northern Virginia

- Town
- Town of Purcellville
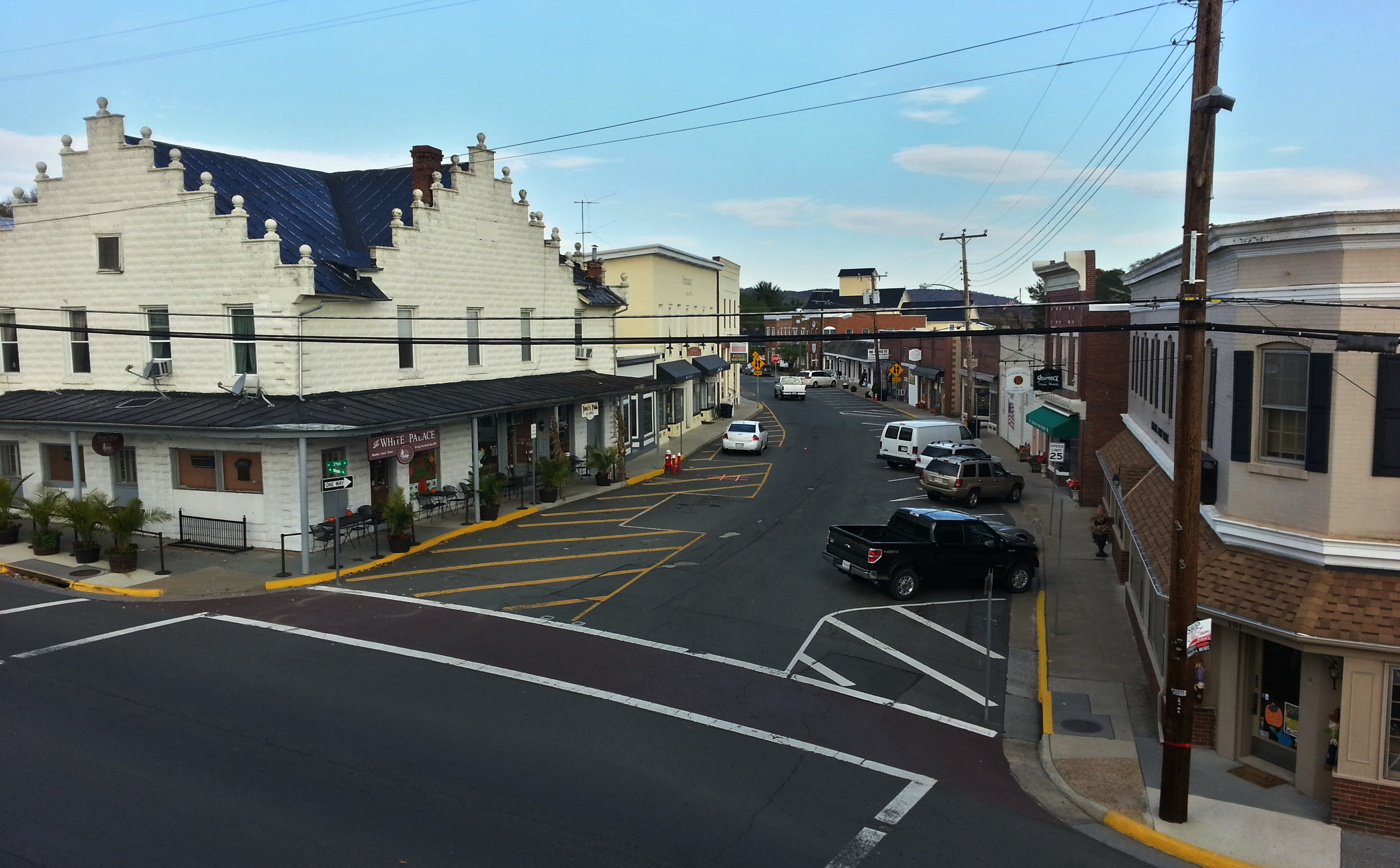
- Downtown Purcellville in November 2014

- Location within Northern Virginia Location within Virginia Location within the United States
- Coordinates: 39°8′4″N 77°42′40″W
- Country: United States
- State: Virginia
- County: Loudoun
- Incorporated: March 14, 1908

Government
  - Mayor: Christopher Bertaut

Area
  - Total: 3.40 sq mi (8.81 km^{2})
  - Land: 3.39 sq mi (8.77 km^{2})
  - Water: 0.015 sq mi (0.04 km^{2})
- Elevation: 574 ft (175 m)

Population (2020)
  - Total: 8,929
  - Density: 3,007.0/sq mi (1,161.02/km^{2})
- Time zone: UTC−5 (Eastern (EST))
  - Summer (DST): UTC−4 (EDT)
- ZIP codes: 20132, 20134, 20160
- Area code: 540
- FIPS code: 51-65008
- GNIS feature ID: 1472871
- Website: www.purcellvilleva.gov

Purcellville is a town in Loudoun County, Virginia, United States. The population was 8,929 according to the 2020 census. Purcellville is the major population center for Western Loudoun and the Loudoun Valley. Many of the older structures remaining in Purcellville reflect the Victorian architecture popular during the early twentieth century.

== History ==
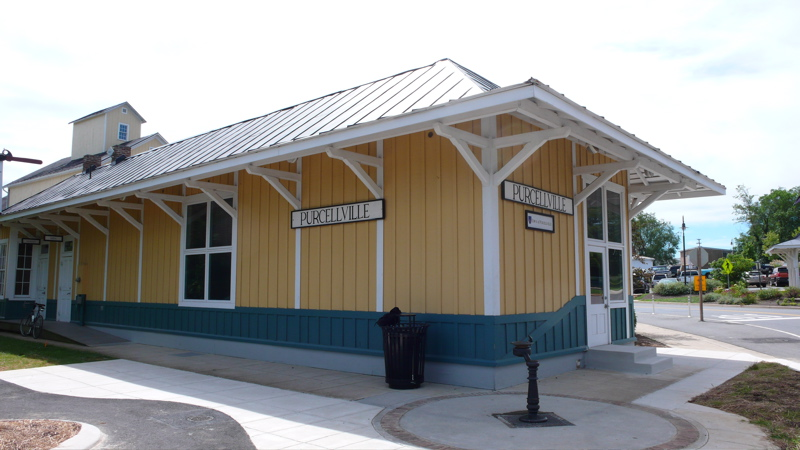
The train station that was once part of the W&OD rail line and is now the western end of the W&OD trail.

Although the first land grant in the area was issued by Lord Fairfax of Cameron in 1740, it was not until 1764 that Purcellville's first known settler, James Dillon from Bucks County, Pennsylvania, arrived. The early ox cart track which wound westward from Leesburg towards the Blue Ridge, known later as the "Great Road," served as the town's nucleus, although farms existed in the area, and Ketoctin Baptist Church had been founded nearby by 1752. The first recorded business, an ordinary (a combined store and inn), was established by Abraham Vickers in 1799. This was followed by a second ordinary, established by Stacey Taylor in 1804, and later by "Purcel's Store" and Post Office, established by Valentine Vernon Purcell (from whom the town's name is derived). A blacksmith's shop, established around 1848, was also among Purcellville's earliest businesses. On July 9, 1853, the village officially adopted the name Purcellville.

The Great Road became an authorized turnpike in 1785 and extended the turnpike system westward from Alexandria to Snickers Gap, and beyond to Berryville and Winchester. With the construction of this Turnpike in 1832, travel through Purcellville began to increase and the first stagecoach arrived in 1841. A railroad link on the Alexandria, Loudoun, and Hampshire line (forerunner to the Washington and Old Dominion Railroad) connecting the town to Leesburg and points east was built prior to the Civil War, and travel to points further west were continued by stagecoach through Purcellville.

Although both Union and Confederate armies passed through Purcellville during the Civil War, the town witnessed limited fighting with the most notable action occurring at the skirmish of Heaton's Crossroads. The town and surrounding area were contained within the area known as Mosby's Confederacy, the main area of operations for Confederate partisan John S. Mosby, and the town was pillaged as part of The Burning Raid of 1864 in retribution for the area's support of Mosby's command.

When the railroad was extended to Purcellville in 1874, the town took Leesburg's place as the beginning of the stage route until the railroad was extended to Round Hill in 1875. The Southern Railway constructed the still existing Purcellville Train Station in 1891. The railroad ceased operation in 1968. Its right-of-way serves as the Washington & Old Dominion Railroad Regional Park, which has its western terminus at the station.

The first public school was built in 1883. On March 14, 1908, the town was incorporated by an act of Virginia's General Assembly.

In the 20th century, a series of disastrous fires, the first in 1900 and then two more in 1914, virtually wiped out the business district, depriving the town of what remained of its earliest architectural heritage. The town's prominent location in the center of the Loudoun Valley and presence of the railroad helped the town to become the major agricultural center of Western Loudoun and led to redevelopment and expansion of the business district in the early and mid-20th century. In the latter 20th century, widening of Virginia State Route 7 has led to increased suburban development in and around the town and Purcellville's traditional dependence upon agriculture as its primary source of income has since diminished as more and more residents are employed outside of the community .

In addition to the Purcellville Train Station, Locust Grove, the Purcellville Historic District, Rich Bottom Farm, and The Tabernacle-Fireman's Field are listed on the National Register of Historic Places.

== Geography ==
Purcellville is located at 39°8′4″N 77°42′40″W (39.13444°N 77.71111°W).

According to the United States Census Bureau, the town has a total area of 3.1 square miles (8.0 km^{2}), all land.

Purcellville lies in western Loudoun County, in the heart of the Loudoun Valley, approximately nine miles west of the county seat of Leesburg. Just to the west are the Blue Ridge Mountains (visible from many areas of town) and the town Round Hill, 4 miles (6.4 km) away. Philomont is 5 miles (8.0 km) south, and Middleburg is approximately 12 miles (19 km) to the southeast. Lovettsville is approximately 11 miles (18 km) to the north.

== Government ==
Purcellville is governed by a town council with six seats and a mayor. Three of the seats, and the mayor's seat, go before the voters every two years. As of 2025, the Purcellville Town Council is composed of Mayor Christopher Bertaut, Vice Mayor Ben Nett, Council members Susan Khalil, Carol Luke, Kevin Wright, Erin Rayner, and Caleb Stought.

In the summer of 2025, both Nett and Frasier were arrested. Nett was accused of misconduct as he attempted to get rid of the police department in an effort to fix the town's ongoing budget problems. A civil jury found in April 2026 that Nett violated policy, but allowed him to stay in office.

In May 2026, both Nett and Town Manager Kwasi Frasier were suspended after being charged with bid rigging and conspiracy. The suspensions for both men happened due to a new law, passed during the 2026 General Assembly Session, requiring suspensions of any official of a town with a population between 8,000 and 10,000 in Planning District 8 to be suspended by the courts if they are alleged to commit felony offenses. The bill was also targeted in other ways at Purcellville's unique situation, requiring a study of the town's debt, requiring more transparency on voting on agenda items, and requiring town managers to be residents of the Commonwealth.

== Demographics ==
Historical population
| Census | Pop. | Note | %± |
|---|---|---|---|
| 1880 | 98 | | — |
| 1910 | 388 | | — |
| 1920 | 549 | | 41.5% |
| 1930 | 747 | | 36.1% |
| 1940 | 787 | | 5.4% |
| 1950 | 945 | | 20.1% |
| 1960 | 1,419 | | 50.2% |
| 1970 | 1,775 | | 25.1% |
| 1980 | 1,567 | | −11.7% |
| 1990 | 1,744 | | 11.3% |
| 2000 | 3,584 | | 105.5% |
| 2010 | 7,727 | | 115.6% |
| 2020 | 8,929 | | 15.6% |
U.S. Decennial Census

As of the census of 2020, there were 8,929 people, and 2,986 households. The population density was 2,626.2 inhabitants per square mile (1,014.0/km^{2}). The racial makeup of the town was 83.2% White, 6.8% African American, 0.3% Native American, 4.7% Asian, 0.0% Pacific Islander, 4.4% from other races. Hispanic or Latino of any race were 12.2% of the population.

The median income for a household in the town was $139,073. The per capita income for the town was $46,399. 3.0% of the population were below the poverty line.

== Education ==
The town's educational institutions include public and private institutions. Loudoun County Public Schools operates the public schools within the town. Public schools covering kindergarten to twelfth grade include Loudoun Valley High School, Woodgrove High School, Blue Ridge Middle School, Harmony Middle School, Emerick, Kenneth W. Culbert, and Mountain View Elementary Schools. Patrick Henry College, a private Christian liberal arts college, is located just inside the eastern border of Purcellville.

== Transportation ==
=== Roadways ===
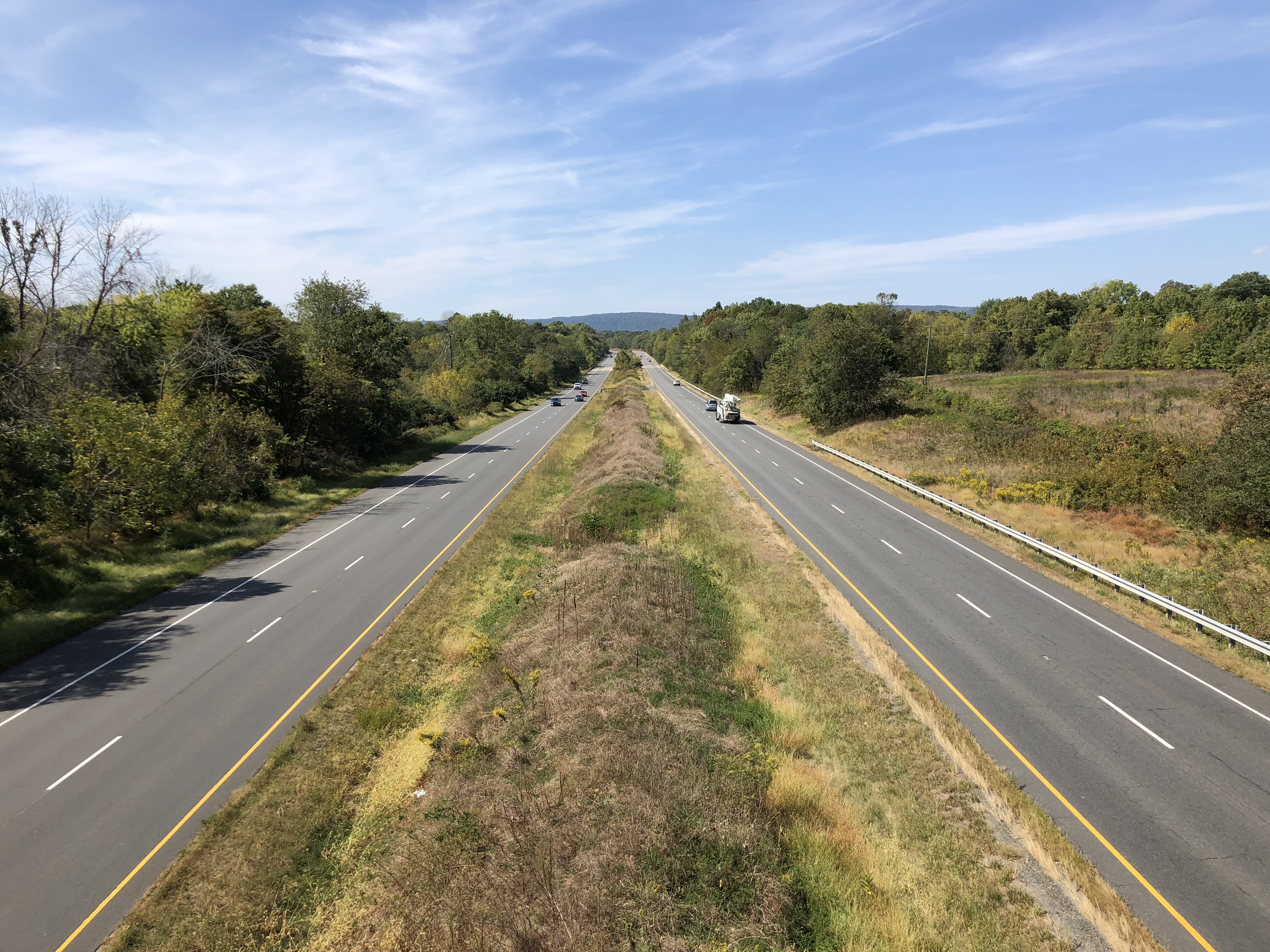
SR 7 westbound in Purcellville, the largest highway in Purcellville

The primary highway serving Purcellville is Virginia State Route 7. SR 7 extends eastward to Leesburg and beyond, eventually terminating in Alexandria, with interchanges at Interstate 495, Interstate 66 and Interstate 395. Towards the west, SR 7 passes Berryville before terminating at Winchester, where it interchanges with Interstate 81. The current alignment of SR 7 through Purcellville is actually a bypass of the original road through the middle of Purcellville, which now comprises SR 7 Business.

Virginia State Route 287 also serves Purcellville. Starting at SR 7 Business, SR 287 heads north, passing through Lovettsville before terminating at the Potomac River, where a bridge connects SR 287 to Brunswick, Maryland.

A future park and ride is planned at the Route 7 and Route 690 interchange. This broke ground on May 1, 2026.

=== Public transportation ===
Purcellville is served by Route 40, which is operated by Virginia Regional Transit. The line operates to nearby Leesburg, Virginia.

Purcellville used to have a park-and-ride which served busses until July 3, 2023. Route 40 moved to a curbside pick up location near the former park and ride, while commuter buses were moved to the Harmony Park and Ride.

== Library ==
The Purcellville Public Library is a county-owned public lending library. The Purcellville Public Library was founded in 1938 by Clarence Robey and Gertrude Robey. The library was designed by Delos H. Smith and built in 1937. The Purcellville Library and its bookmobile service were some of the initial branches in the creation of the Loudoun County Public Library system, established in 1973, alongside the Sterling Public Library.

== Public safety ==
The Purcellville Police Department is a state-accredited 24-hour law enforcement agency, comprising 21 sworn officers and 2 civilian personnel. The Police Department is located at 125 Hirst Road in Purcellville and is one of four full-service law enforcement agencies primarily serving in Loudoun County. It also has an auxiliary unit, the Purcellville Citizen Support Team, that performs street patrols and assists officers in accidents and civil events like parades.

On April 8, 2025, the Purcellville Town Council voted to eliminate its police department. This occurred during the same meeting the police department was congratulated for achieving reaccreditation and the year after Purcellville was noted to be the safest town in Virginia. The bloc voting to eliminate the police department included Vice Mayor Ben Nett. Nett was previously employed with the Purcellville Police Department, and his employment status at the time of this vote was unclear. Nett was the subject of internal affairs investigations for dishonesty in February, 2025 that led to the Loudoun Commonwealth Attorney placing Nett on the Brady/Giglio list. The Brady/Giglio list is for police officers that the Commonwealth Attorney's office believes have dishonesty issues and will not subpoena to testify. It can be considered career-ending.

Purcellville Volunteer Rescue Squad Company 14, established in 1969, is a 100% volunteer organization operated in partnership with Loudoun County Fire and Rescue. The organization operates three ambulances and provides both Basic Life Support (BLS) and Advanced Life Support (ALS) to the citizens and community of Purcellville and its surrounding areas. Loudoun County EMS Supervisor 602 operates out of company 14 24/7.

Purcellville Volunteer Fire Company 2 is a separate organization and is staffed by career Loudoun County personnel from 6:00 AM to 6:00 PM and volunteers from 6:00 PM to 6:00 AM. During the day, the career staff have first-pull on any emergency call for the station, but volunteers must staff the second-out fire apparatus on a call and any remaining calls while the career staff are out of the station. Their apparatus includes a class A attack pumper/medium duty squad (Rescue Engine 602), class A attack pumper(Engine 602), 3,000 gallon tanker (Tanker 602), 102 ft ladder truck (Tower 602), a brush truck (Brush 602), a jeep designed in house for off-road fires (Brush 602B), a Ford Excursion for transportation of personnel (SERV 602), a 2011 Ford F250 for transporting equipment and snowplow during the winter (Utility 602) and a 2011 Chevy Tahoe designated Command 602.

Purcellville Fire and Purcellville Rescue moved into their new building at 500 North Maple Avenue in early June 2009. While they reside under one roof, they still retain their independent company names and numbers. Purcellville Fire's side opens onto Hirst Road, while Purcellville Rescue opens on to Maple Avenue.

Loudoun County Battalion Chief 602 also operates out of Station 2 24/7.

== Sports ==
The Purcellville Cannons of the Valley Baseball League have played at Fireman's Field in downtown Purcellville since 2016.

The Virginia Valley Vipers of 94x50 League have played at Patrick Henry College since 2023.

== Notable people ==
- Madeleine Albright, ambassador to the UN and Secretary of State
- Shaun Alexander, NFL running back
- Henry Cole, illustrator
- Steve Czaban, sports broadcaster
- Michael Farris, lawyer and activist
- Drew Hunter, runner
- Blair Brown Lipsitz, volleyball player for Penn State
- Billy Pierce, choreographer
- Betsy Woodruff Swan, journalist

== Climate ==
The climate in this area is characterized by hot, humid summers and generally mild to cool winters. According to the Köppen Climate Classification system, Purcellville has a humid subtropical climate, abbreviated "Cfa" on climate maps.

Climate data for Purcellville, Virginia (1991–2020 normals, extremes 1900–present)
| Month | Jan | Feb | Mar | Apr | May | Jun | Jul | Aug | Sep | Oct | Nov | Dec | Year |
|---|---|---|---|---|---|---|---|---|---|---|---|---|---|
| Record high °F (°C) | 78 (26) | 81 (27) | 92 (33) | 100 (38) | 102 (39) | 107 (42) | 109 (43) | 108 (42) | 108 (42) | 98 (37) | 86 (30) | 79 (26) | 109 (43) |
| Mean daily maximum °F (°C) | 41.0 (5.0) | 44.0 (6.7) | 52.6 (11.4) | 64.5 (18.1) | 72.9 (22.7) | 81.4 (27.4) | 86.4 (30.2) | 84.7 (29.3) | 77.8 (25.4) | 66.3 (19.1) | 54.9 (12.7) | 44.7 (7.1) | 64.3 (17.9) |
| Daily mean °F (°C) | 32.8 (0.4) | 35.0 (1.7) | 42.5 (5.8) | 53.4 (11.9) | 62.2 (16.8) | 71.2 (21.8) | 76.0 (24.4) | 74.3 (23.5) | 66.9 (19.4) | 55.3 (12.9) | 44.7 (7.1) | 36.5 (2.5) | 54.2 (12.3) |
| Mean daily minimum °F (°C) | 24.5 (−4.2) | 25.9 (−3.4) | 32.3 (0.2) | 42.2 (5.7) | 51.6 (10.9) | 61.1 (16.2) | 65.5 (18.6) | 63.9 (17.7) | 56.1 (13.4) | 44.3 (6.8) | 34.5 (1.4) | 28.4 (−2.0) | 44.2 (6.8) |
| Record low °F (°C) | −15 (−26) | −13 (−25) | −2 (−19) | 10 (−12) | 27 (−3) | 39 (4) | 46 (8) | 40 (4) | 30 (−1) | 19 (−7) | 5 (−15) | −11 (−24) | −15 (−26) |
| Average precipitation inches (mm) | 3.05 (77) | 2.56 (65) | 3.61 (92) | 3.54 (90) | 4.35 (110) | 4.25 (108) | 4.08 (104) | 3.57 (91) | 4.77 (121) | 3.52 (89) | 3.13 (80) | 3.35 (85) | 43.78 (1,112) |
Source: NOAA
