= National Register of Historic Places listings in Loudoun County, Virginia =

Location of Loudoun County in Virginia

This is a list of the National Register of Historic Places listings in Loudoun County, Virginia.

This is intended to be a complete list of the properties and districts on the National Register of Historic Places in Loudoun County, Virginia, United States. The locations of National Register properties and districts for which the latitude and longitude coordinates are included below, may be seen in an online map.

There are 101 properties and districts listed on the National Register in the county, including 7 National Historic Landmarks. Another property was once listed but has been removed.

This National Park Service list is complete through NPS recent listings posted October 2, 2026.

== Current listings ==
	Name on the Register	Image	Date listed	Location	City or town	Description
1	Aldie Mill Historic District	Aldie Mill Historic District	September 15, 1970 (#70000806)	Both sides of U.S. Route 50 from east of Tail Race Rd. to west of Meetinghouse Ln. 38°58′31″N 77°38′28″W	Aldie	
2	Arcola Elementary School	Arcola Elementary School	June 5, 2013 (#13000363)	24244 Gum Spring Rd. 38°56′52″N 77°32′14″W	Arcola	
3	Arcola Slave Quarters	Arcola Slave Quarters	November 26, 2008 (#08001113)	24837 Evergreen Mills Rd. 38°56′49″N 77°31′43″W	Arcola	
4	Ashburn Presbyterian Church	Ashburn Presbyterian Church	August 5, 1999 (#99000962)	20962 Ashburn Rd. 39°02′19″N 77°29′08″W	Leesburg	
5	Ball's Bluff Battlefield Historic District and National Cemetery	Ball's Bluff Battlefield Historic District and National Cemetery	April 27, 1984 (#84003880)	Ball's Bluff; 39°07′55″N 77°31′39″W	Leesburg	
6	Bear's Den Rural Historic District	Bear's Den Rural Historic District	May 14, 2009 (#08001112)	Generally runs along both sides of the ridge along parts of Raven Rocks and Blue Ridge Mountain Rds. 39°06′32″N 77°50′54″W	Bluemont	
7	Belmont	Belmont	February 8, 1980 (#80004198)	1.8 miles (2.9 km) north of Ashburn; 39°04′10″N 77°29′29″W	Ashburn	
8	Benton	Benton	June 14, 1984 (#84003545)	Snake Hill Rd. 39°00′11″N 77°45′58″W	Middleburg	
9	Bluemont Historic District	Bluemont Historic District	February 23, 1984 (#84003546)	Snickersville Turnpike and Clayton Hall Rd. 39°06′40″N 77°50′04″W	Bluemont	
10	Broad Run Bridge and Tollhouse	Broad Run Bridge and Tollhouse	April 17, 1970 (#70000808)	Junction of State Routes 7 and State Route 28 with Broad Run; 39°02′49″N 77°25′59″W	Sterling	
11	Brown-Koerner House	Brown-Koerner House	August 15, 2016 (#16000531)	38340 Winsome Trail Ln. 39°10′23″N 77°40′28″W	Purcellville	
12	Carlheim	Carlheim	December 28, 1979 (#79003050)	North of Leesburg on U.S. Route 15; 39°07′22″N 77°33′16″W	Leesburg	
13	Catoctin Creek Bridge	Catoctin Creek Bridge	June 25, 1974 (#74002136)	Featherbed Ln., north of Waterford; 39°13′56″N 77°35′29″W	Waterford	
14	Clapham's Ferry	Clapham's Ferry	September 4, 1997 (#97001076)	44344 E. Spinks Ferry Rd. 39°13′21″N 77°27′52″W	Leesburg	
15	Cleremont Farm	Cleremont Farm	January 25, 1997 (#96001627)	Eastern side of Trappe Rd., 0.6 miles (0.97 km) northeast of Millville Rd. 39°02′53″N 77°51′49″W	Upperville	
16	Crednal	Crednal	February 22, 2011 (#11000034)	34500 Welbourne Rd. 39°00′22″N 77°48′41″W	Unison	
17	Douglass High School	Douglass High School	September 24, 1992 (#92001274)	408 E. Market St. 39°06′35″N 77°33′17″W	Leesburg	
18	Ebenezer Baptist Churches	Ebenezer Baptist Churches	June 3, 1994 (#94000548)	Northwestern corner of the junction of Airmont and Ebenezer Church Rds. 39°03′30″N 77°48′42″W	Bloomfield	
19	Ellwood	Ellwood	February 11, 2004 (#04000054)	17360 Count Turf Place; 39°08′09″N 77°35′15″W	Leesburg	
20	Fair Oaks	Fair Oaks	February 6, 2014 (#13001171)	23718 New Mountain Rd. 38°57′45″N 77°38′00″W	Aldie	
21	Farmer's Delight	Farmer's Delight	June 2, 1973 (#73002033)	About 3 miles (4.8 km) north of Middleburg off Mountville Rd. 39°01′11″N 77°45′12″W	Leithtown	
22	First Baptist Church Watson		October 5, 2026 (#100013493)	40931 Red Hill Road; 38°59′19″N 77°35′11″W	Leesburg	
23	Fleetwood Farm	Fleetwood Farm	February 1, 1991 (#90002172)	Evergreen Mills Rd. south of the junction with Red Hill Rd. 38°59′20″N 77°33′44″W	Arcola	
24	Francis-Gulick Mill		February 1, 2006 (#05001582)	Northern side of Goose Creek; 39°01′39″N 77°33′27″W	Leesburg	
25	Furr Farm	Furr Farm	August 17, 2012 (#12000541)	40590 Snickersville Turnpike; 38°59′30″N 77°39′45″W	Aldie	
26	Glebe of Shelburne Parish	Glebe of Shelburne Parish	April 1, 1975 (#75002023)	3.5 miles (5.6 km) south of Lincoln off Shelburne Glebe Rd. 39°04′13″N 77°40′32″W	Lincoln	
27	Amos Goodin House	Amos Goodin House	June 12, 2017 (#100001081)	37738 Wright Farm Dr. 39°09′01″N 77°41′54″W	Purcellville	
28	Goose Creek Historic District	Goose Creek Historic District	November 14, 1982 (#82001822)	Roughly bounded by the town of Purcellville and Greggsville, Harmony Church, Mount Gilead, North Fork, Sands, and Telegraph Springs Rds. 39°06′51″N 77°41′50″W	Lincoln	
29	Goose Creek Meetinghouse Complex	Goose Creek Meetinghouse Complex	July 24, 1974 (#74002135)	South of State Route 7; 39°06′49″N 77°41′41″W	Lincoln	
30	Goose Creek Stone Bridge	Goose Creek Stone Bridge	October 9, 1974 (#74002134)	Northwest of Atoka off U.S. Route 50; 38°58′54″N 77°49′08″W	Atoka	
31	Green Garden	Green Garden	July 24, 2007 (#07000769)	22439 Green Garden Rd. 38°59′57″N 77°51′43″W	Upperville	
32	Hamilton Masonic Lodge	Hamilton Masonic Lodge	December 9, 1999 (#99001505)	43 S. Rogers St. 39°08′02″N 77°39′53″W	Hamilton	
33	Harpers Ferry National Historical Park	Harpers Ferry National Historical Park	October 15, 1966 (#66000041)	At the confluence of the Potomac and Shenandoah rivers 39°19′00″N 77°41′40″W	Harpers Ferry	
34	Hibbs Bridge	Hibbs Bridge	March 1, 2011 (#11000067)	Snickersville Turnpike, 6 miles (9.7 km) northwest of Aldie between Hibbs Bridge Rd. to the south and Watermill Rd. to the north 39°02′15″N 77°43′22″W	Mountville	
35	Hillsboro Historic District	Hillsboro Historic District	May 7, 1979 (#79003049)	State Route 9; also Charles Town Pike, between Hillsboro Rd. and Stony Point Rd. 39°11′56″N 77°43′28″W	Hillsboro	Charles Town Pike represents a boundary increase of March 23, 2012
36	Home Farm	Home Farm	August 10, 2007 (#07000828)	40332 Mount Gilead Rd. 39°04′36″N 77°36′32″W	Leesburg	
37	Bernard Hough House		August 9, 2021 (#100006815)	15563 Hillsboro Rd. 39°11′11″N 77°43′12″W	Hillsboro vicinity	
38	Huntland	Huntland	December 24, 2013 (#13000990)	35955 Huntland Farm Rd. 39°00′44″N 77°45′45″W	Middleburg	
39	James Farm	James Farm	March 18, 2019 (#100003543)	15021 Mountain Rd. 39°12′11″N 77°42′56″W	Purcellville	
40	Janelia	Janelia	March 20, 1987 (#86003596)	North side of State Route 7, 6 miles (9.7 km) east of Leesburg; 39°04′10″N 77°27′57″W	Ashburn	
41	Janney House	Janney House	November 27, 2004 (#04001269)	15 W. Colonial Highway; 39°08′05″N 77°39′55″W	Hamilton	
42	Ketoctin Baptist Church	Ketoctin Baptist Church	May 22, 2003 (#03000452)	Approximately 2 miles (3.2 km) north of State Route 7 at the junction of Allder School Rd. and Ketoctin Church Rd. 39°09′27″N 77°44′56″W	Round Hill	
43	Laurel Hill Farm		July 21, 2026 (#100013234)	16191 Hamilton Station Road; 39°10′23″N 77°37′53″W	Waterford	
44	Leesburg Historic District	Leesburg Historic District	February 26, 1970 (#70000807)	Area of the original town centered at the junction of U.S. Route 15 and State Route 7; also roughly bounded by North and Union Sts., Morven Park Rd., and Harrison St. 39°06′54″N 77°33′54″W	Leesburg	Second set of boundaries represents a boundary increase of May 22, 2001
45	Little River Turnpike Bridge	Little River Turnpike Bridge	April 11, 2014 (#14000148)	U.S. Route 50 over the Little River; 38°58′31″N 77°38′22″W	Aldie	
46	Llangollen	Llangollen	August 21, 2017 (#100001497)	21515 Trappe Rd. 39°01′51″N 77°53′31″W	Upperville	
47	Locust Grove	Locust Grove	February 21, 2007 (#07000083)	200 Locust Grove Dr. 39°07′41″N 77°42′57″W	Purcellville	
48	Loudoun Agricultural and Mechanical Institute	Loudoun Agricultural and Mechanical Institute	July 8, 1982 (#82004568)	Oatlands Rd. 39°00′28″N 77°39′36″W	Aldie	Now called Institute Farm
49	Loudoun County Courthouse	Loudoun County Courthouse	December 13, 2024 (#100011372)	10 North King Street; 39°06′56″N 77°33′52″W	Leesburg	
50	Lovettsville Historic District	Lovettsville Historic District	August 10, 2012 (#12000518)	Roughly N. and S. Berlin Pike, E. Broad Way, S. Light, S. Locust, and S. Loudoun Sts., and Lovettsville Rd. 39°16′21″N 77°38′12″W	Lovettsville	
51	Lucketts School	Lucketts School	October 14, 1993 (#93001125)	42361 Lucketts Rd. 39°12′54″N 77°32′03″W	Lucketts	
52	Gen. George C. Marshall House	Gen. George C. Marshall House	June 19, 1996 (#96000972)	217 Edwards Ferry Rd. 39°06′49″N 77°33′35″W	Leesburg	
53	Middleburg Historic District	Middleburg Historic District	October 29, 1982 (#82001823)	U.S. Route 50 and The Plains and Landmark School Rds. 38°58′12″N 77°44′00″W	Middleburg	
54	Gen. William Mitchell House	Gen. William Mitchell House	December 8, 1976 (#76002112)	0.5 miles (0.80 km) south of Middleburg on The Plains Rd. 38°57′47″N 77°44′30″W	Middleburg	The house and greater portion of the property are in Fauquier County
55	Morven Park	Morven Park	February 18, 1975 (#75002022)	1 mile (1.6 km) northwest of Leesburg off U.S. Route 15; 39°08′26″N 77°34′25″W	Leesburg	
56	Mount Zion Old School Baptist Church-VDHR 53-339	Mount Zion Old School Baptist Church-VDHR 53-339	May 8, 1998 (#98000452)	40309 U.S. Route 50; 38°57′50″N 77°36′36″W	Aldie	
57	Mt. Olive Methodist Episcopal Church	Mt. Olive Methodist Episcopal Church	January 20, 2005 (#04001542)	20460 Gleedsville Rd. 39°03′03″N 77°36′10″W	Leesburg	
58	Much Haddam	Much Haddam	December 28, 1990 (#90001988)	U.S. Route 50 west of its junction with The Plains Rd. 38°57′59″N 77°44′33″W	Middleburg	
59	Murray Hill	Murray Hill	November 19, 2014 (#14000945)	42910 Edwards Ferry Rd. 39°06′50″N 77°30′47″W	Leesburg	
60	Myrtle Hall Farm	Myrtle Hall Farm	May 17, 2006 (#06000408)	19305 Ridgeside Rd. 39°05′01″N 77°50′07″W	Bluemont	
61	Edward Nichols House	Edward Nichols House	December 4, 1987 (#87002117)	330 W. Market St. 39°07′05″N 77°34′23″W	Leesburg	
62	Oak Hill	Oak Hill	October 15, 1966 (#66000842)	8 miles (13 km) south of Leesburg on U.S. Route 15; 38°59′51″N 77°37′14″W	Leesburg	
63	Oakham Farm	Oakham Farm	February 2, 2016 (#15001039)	23226 Oakham Farm Ln. 38°58′35″N 77°41′19″W	Middleburg	
64	Oatlands	Oatlands	November 12, 1969 (#69000255)	South of the junction of U.S. Route 15 and Gap Rd. 39°02′27″N 77°37′03″W	Leesburg	
65	Oatlands Historic District	Oatlands Historic District	May 3, 1974 (#74002327)	South of Leesburg off U.S. Route 15; 39°01′48″N 77°37′20″W	Leesburg	Expansion around Oatlands NHL incorporating scenic easements
66	Old Stone Church Archeological Site (44LD376)	Old Stone Church Archeological Site (44LD376)	September 7, 1989 (#89001402)	110 Cornwall St., NW. 39°07′02″N 77°33′56″W	Leesburg	
67	Old Welbourne Farm and Dulany Family Cemetery	Old Welbourne Farm and Dulany Family Cemetery	February 6, 2014 (#13001172)	21398 Willisville Rd. 39°01′44″N 77°49′21″W	Bluemont	
68	Paeonian Springs Historic District	Paeonian Springs Historic District	May 1, 2006 (#06000352)	Parts of Berry Bramble Ln., Catoctin Ridge St., Charles Town Pike, Highland Circle, and Simpson Circle; 39°08′58″N 77°37′12″W	Paeonian Springs	
69	Philomont Historic District		December 5, 2023 (#100009206)	Jct. of VA 630 (JEB Stuart Rd.) and VA 734 (Snickersville Tpk.); 39°03′23″N 77°44′25″W	Philomont	
70	Purcellville Historic District	Purcellville Historic District	April 4, 2007 (#07000277)	Roughly bounded by the Washington & Old Dominion Trail, S. 32nd St., W. F and E. G Sts., and Maple Ave. 39°08′13″N 77°42′54″W	Purcellville	
71	Purcellville Train Station	Purcellville Train Station	May 28, 2010 (#10000307)	200 N. 21st St. 39°08′18″N 77°42′58″W	Purcellville	
72	Red Fox Inn	Red Fox Inn	November 13, 1997 (#97001403)	2 E. Washington St. 38°58′09″N 77°44′08″W	Middleburg	
73	Rich Bottom Farm	Rich Bottom Farm	February 21, 1997 (#97000156)	16860 Hillsboro Rd., 1.5 miles (2.4 km) north of Purcellville; 39°08′59″N 77°44′01″W	Purcellville	
74	Rock Hill Farm	Rock Hill Farm	August 27, 2009 (#09000664)	20775 Airmont Rd. 39°02′55″N 77°49′52″W	Bluemont	
75	Rock Spring Farm	Rock Spring Farm	March 13, 2002 (#02000177)	329 Loudoun St., SW. 39°06′58″N 77°34′26″W	Leesburg	
76	Rockland	Rockland	May 14, 1987 (#87000752)	Eastern side of U.S. Route 15, north of Leesburg; 39°09′50″N 77°32′05″W	Leesburg	
77	Rokeby	Rokeby	May 30, 1976 (#76002109)	2.4 miles (3.9 km) southwest of Leesburg off Gleedsville Rd. 39°04′18″N 77°35′46″W	Leesburg	
78	Rose Hill Farm	Rose Hill Farm	August 25, 1994 (#94000986)	Northern side of U.S. Route 50, 1.5 miles (2.4 km) west of the junction with Atoka Rd. 38°59′00″N 77°49′41″W	Upperville	
79	Round Hill Historic District	Round Hill Historic District	May 28, 2009 (#09000366)	Roughly bounded by State Route 7 to the south, Locust St. to the west, Bridge St. on the east, and the northern edge of Main St. to the north 39°07′58″N 77°46′06″W	Round Hill	
80	Shiloh Baptist Church	Shiloh Baptist Church	November 24, 2017 (#100001852)	304 E. Marshall St. 38°58′18″N 77°43′54″W	Middleburg	
81	Sleepy Hollow Farm	Sleepy Hollow Farm	February 13, 2007 (#07000048)	39902 Thomas Mill Rd. 39°06′57″N 77°37′27″W	Leesburg	
82	William Smith House	William Smith House	April 2, 2003 (#03000189)	38678 Piggott Bottom Rd. 39°09′35″N 77°39′57″W	Hamilton	
83	Snickersville Turnpike		June 16, 2022 (#100007792)	Snickersville Turnpike, VA 734; 39°02′32″N 77°43′38″W	Bluemont vicinity	
84	Spring Hill Farm	Spring Hill Farm	July 27, 2005 (#05000766)	39018 Piggott Bottom Rd. 39°09′15″N 77°38′56″W	Hamilton	
85	Stoke	Stoke	December 8, 2015 (#15000878)	23587 Stoke Farm Ln. 38°58′01″N 77°39′56″W	Aldie	
86	Sunnyside Farm	Sunnyside Farm	August 16, 1994 (#94000989)	South side of State Route 7 Business, 1,150 feet (350 m) east of the junction with State Route 287; 39°07′54″N 77°41′18″W	Hamilton	
87	The Tabernacle-Fireman's Field	The Tabernacle-Fireman's Field	May 28, 2010 (#10000308)	250 S. Nursery Ave. 39°08′00″N 77°42′54″W	Purcellville	
88	Taylorstown Historic District	Taylorstown Historic District	January 30, 1978 (#78003027)	Around the junction of Taylorstown and Downey Mill Rds. at Catoctin Creek; also 13122 Furnace Mountain, 12969 and 13090 Taylorstown, and 12995 and 13000 Hoysville Rds. 39°15′15″N 77°34′31″W	Taylorstown	District includes Whiskey Hill. Second set of boundaries represents a boundary increase of May 26, 2005
89	Temple Hall	Temple Hall	February 13, 2007 (#07000053)	15764 Temple Hall Ln. 39°10′41″N 77°31′43″W	Leesburg	
90	Union Street School		February 14, 2023 (#100008649)	20 Union St. 39°07′12″N 77°33′50″W	Leesburg	
91	Unison Battlefield Historic District	Unison Battlefield Historic District	November 22, 2011 (#11000835)	Parts of Quaker Ln. and Jeb Stuart, Unison, Newlin Mill, Millville, Bloomfield, Welbourne, and Greengarden Rds. 39°02′12″N 77°47′15″W	Unison	
92	Unison Historic District	Unison Historic District	May 22, 2003 (#03000442)	Parts of Unison and Bloomfield Rds. 39°02′07″N 77°47′28″W	Middleburg	
93	Dr. Joseph Vandeventer House		March 23, 2022 (#100007538)	39901 Highfield Park Ln. 39°07′57″N 77°37′15″W	Leesburg vicinity	
94	Vestal's Gap Road and Lanesville Historic District	Vestal's Gap Road and Lanesville Historic District	February 3, 2000 (#99001722)	21544 Cascades Parkway; 39°01′03″N 77°24′13″W	Sterling	
95	William Virts House	William Virts House	February 22, 2011 (#11000027)	38670 Old Wheatland Rd. 39°11′16″N 77°39′57″W	Waterford	
96	Waterford Historic District	Waterford Historic District	June 3, 1969 (#69000256)	Northwest of Leesburg on Loyalty Rd. 39°11′12″N 77°36′44″W	Waterford	
97	Waverly	Waverly	February 10, 1983 (#83003288)	212 S. King St. 39°06′22″N 77°34′05″W	Leesburg	
98	Welbourne	Welbourne	February 23, 1972 (#72001404)	Northwest of the junction of Welbourne and St. Louis Rds. 39°00′04″N 77°48′44″W	Middleburg	
99	Willisville Historic District	Willisville Historic District	December 9, 2019 (#100004746)	33000 & 34000 blks. of Welbourne Rd. 39°00′27″N 77°50′03″W	Middleburg vicinity	
100	Woodburn	Woodburn	December 12, 1976 (#76002111)	3 miles (4.8 km) southwest of Leesburg off Harmony Church Rd. 39°05′22″N 77°37′10″W	Leesburg	
101	Woodgrove	Woodgrove	September 14, 2002 (#02001004)	16860 Woodgrove Rd. 39°09′06″N 77°46′10″W	Round Hill	

== Former listing ==
	Name on the Register	Image	Date listed	Date removed	Location	City or town	Description
1	Exeter		August 14, 1973 (#73002032)	March 19, 2001	East of Leesburg on Edwards Ferry Rd. 39°06′57″N 77°32′26″W	Leesburg	Burned August 1980

== See also ==
- List of National Historic Landmarks in Virginia
- National Register of Historic Places listings in Virginia
