= Fairoaks =

Fairoaks may refer to:

- Fairoaks, Arkansas, alternate name of Fair Oaks, Arkansas
- Fairoaks Airport
- Fairoaks (novel), a 1957 novel by Frank Yerby

== See also ==
- Fair Oaks (disambiguation)
