= Fair Oaks, Virginia =

Fair Oaks, Virginia may refer to:

- Fair Oaks, Fairfax County, Virginia (census-designated place)
- Fair Oaks, Henrico County, Virginia (unincorporated community)

== See also ==
- Battle of Fair Oaks, fought in Henrico County, Virginia
- Fair Oaks (disambiguation)
