= Old Welbourne Farm and Dulany Family Cemetery =

Historic site in Loudoun County, Virginia, US

- U.S. National Register of Historic Places
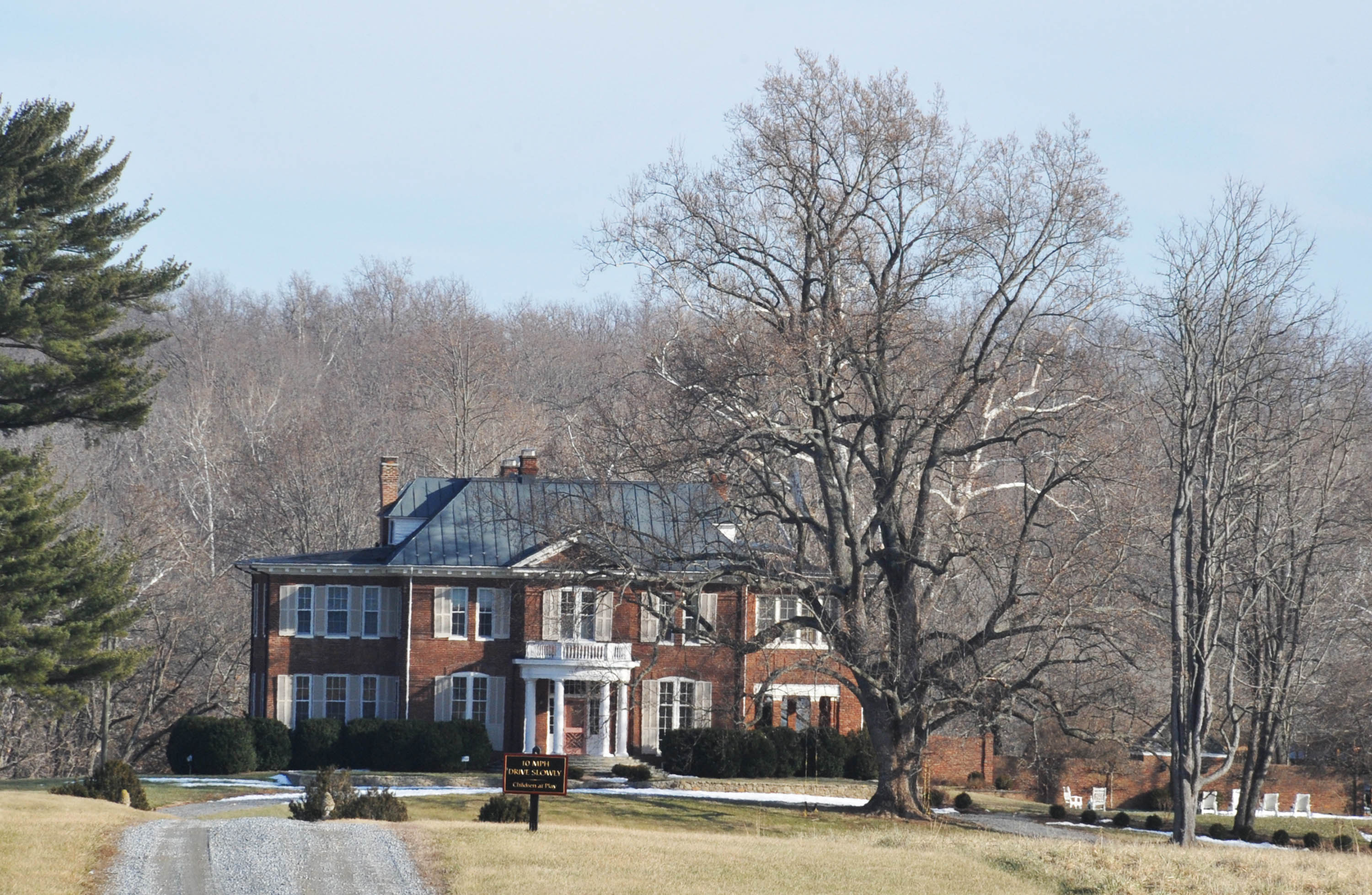

- Location within Northern Virginia Location within Virginia Location within the United States
- Nearest city: Upperville, Virginia
- Coordinates: 39°1′44″N 77°49′21″W
- Area: 620 acres (250 ha)
- Built: 1878
- Architectural style: Queen Anne; Colonial Revival
- NRHP reference No.: 13001172
- Added to NRHP: February 6, 2014

The Old Welbourne Farm and Dulany Family Cemetery is a historic farmstead in Loudoun County, Virginia, near the village of Upperville. The main farmhouse, a brick three-story building, was built c. 1878 in the Queen Anne style, and remodeled in 1910, giving it more Colonial Revival styling. The 620+ acre property includes the site of a c. 1812 Welbourne family stone homestead, and the 1837 Dulany family cemetery, which was established when John Peyton Dulany lived in the old Welbourne homestead. Dulany was responsible for the construction of Welbourne, and died one of the county's wealthiest men. Colonel Richard Dulany, founder of the Piedmont Fox Hounds (1840), which is the oldest fox hunting group in the United States, and the Upperville Colt & Horse Show (1853), was born in the 1812 cabin on the property and is buried in the Dulany family cemetery on the property. The "Old Welbourne" house described here probably was built by Richard Dulany, Jr.

The United States Department of the Interior placed the property on the National Register of Historic Places in 2014. Old Welbourne is owned by a private family and is not open to the public.

== See also ==
- National Register of Historic Places listings in Loudoun County, Virginia
