= Amos Goodin House =

Historic house in Virginia, United States

- U.S. National Register of Historic Places
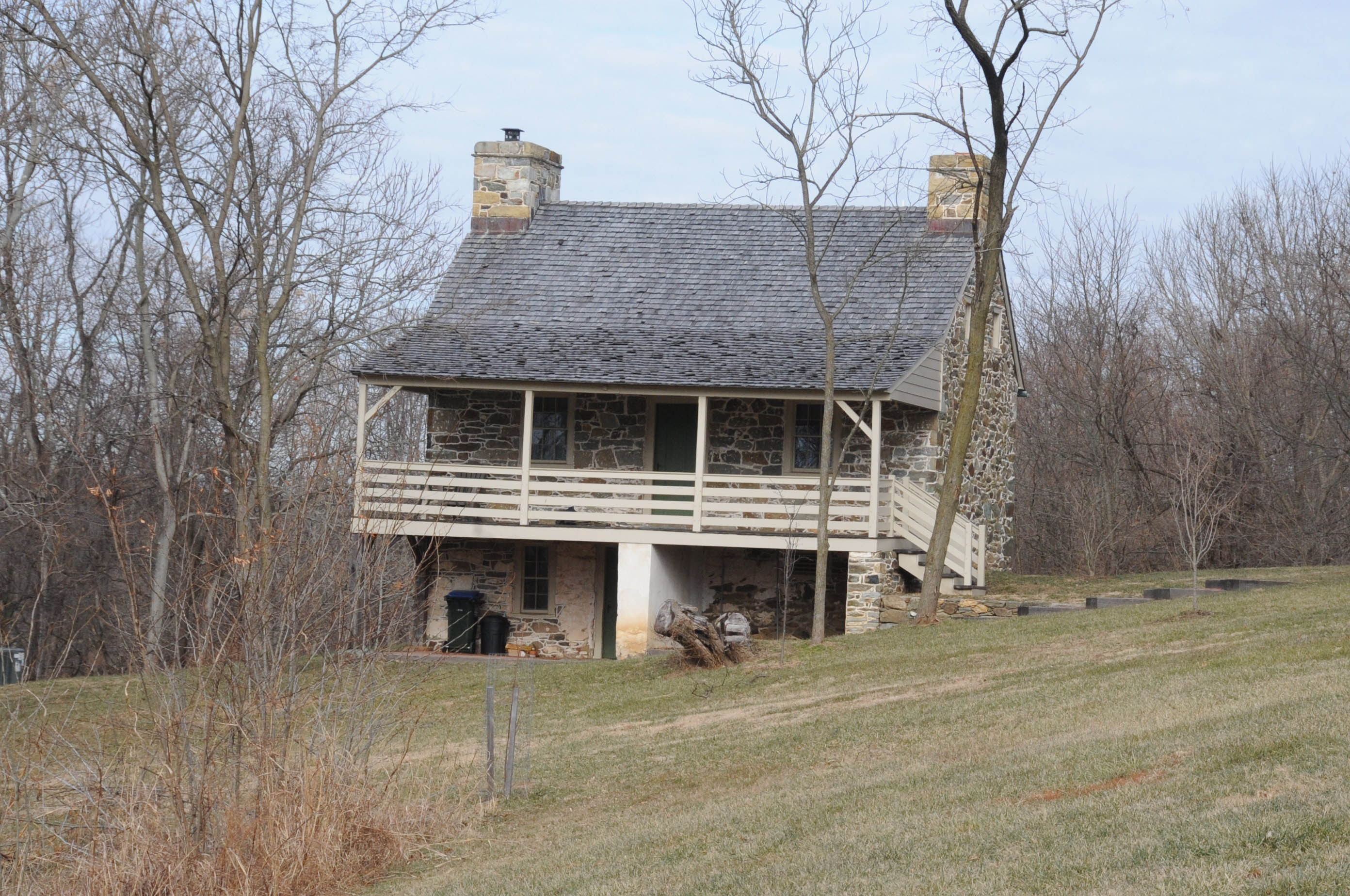

- Location within Northern Virginia Location within Virginia Location within the United States
- Location: 37738 Wright Farm Dr., near Purcellville, Virginia
- Coordinates: 39°9′1″N 77°41′54″W
- Area: 4 acres (1.6 ha)
- Built: c. 1810
- Architectural style: Federal
- NRHP reference No.: 100001081
- Added to NRHP: June 12, 2017

The Amos Goodin House is a historic house at 37738 Wright Farm Road, in rural Loudoun County, Virginia northeast of Purcellville. Once the center of a larger landholding, the house is a two-story stone farmhouse built about 1810, with a wooden porch extending across the front. The layout of the house is a rare surviving example of an English "Mora Stuga" plan, with a hall that has a winding stair, and a single large chamber occupying most of the ground floor.

The property was listed on the National Register of Historic Places in 2017.

== See also ==
- National Register of Historic Places listings in Loudoun County, Virginia
