= Oakham Farm =

Historic house in Virginia, United States

- U.S. National Register of Historic Places
- Virginia Landmarks Register
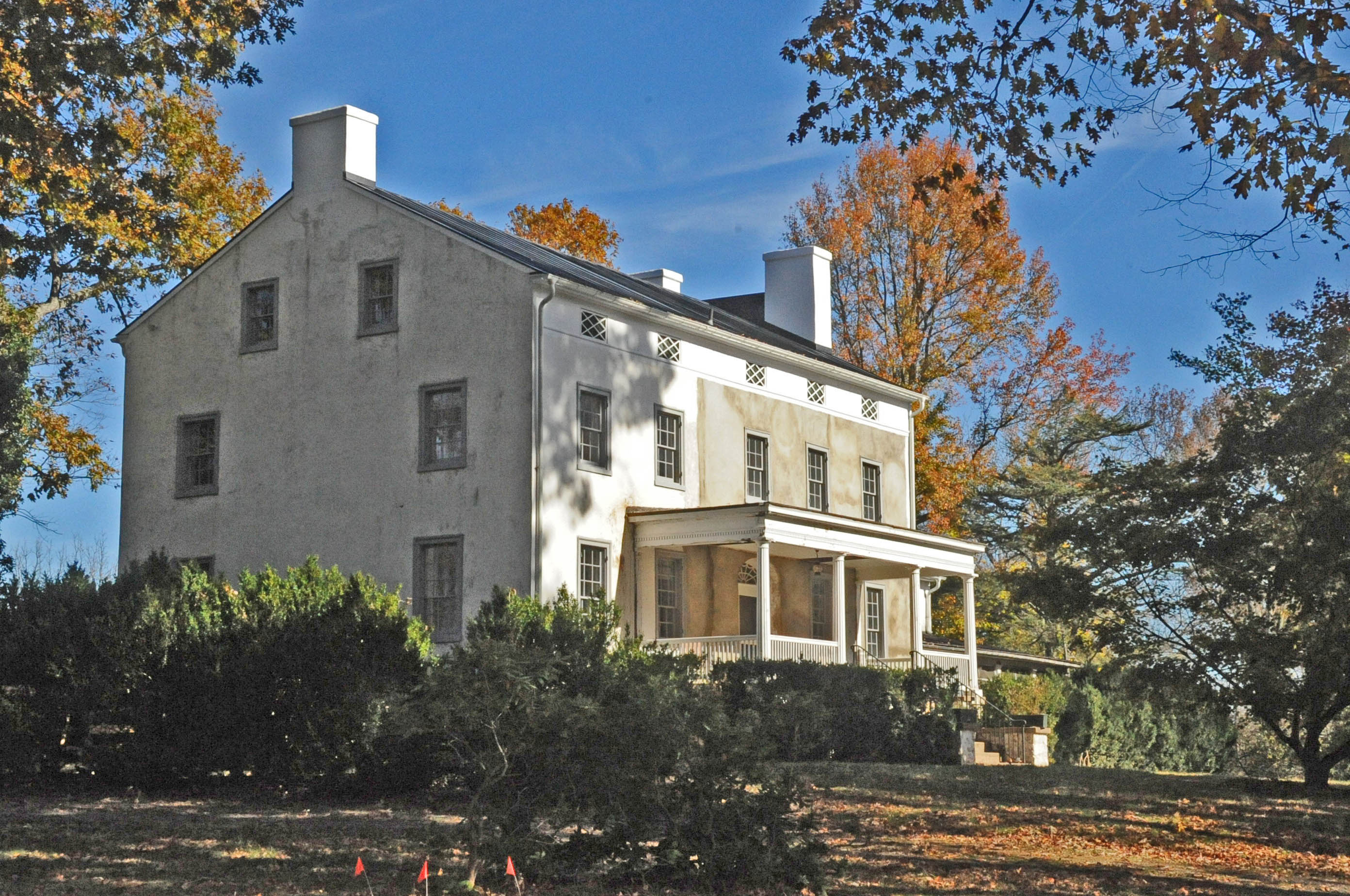

- Location within Northern Virginia Location within Virginia Location within the United States
- Location: 23226 Oakham Farm Ln., Middleburg, Virginia
- Coordinates: 38°58′35″N 77°41′19″W
- Area: 100 acres (40 ha)
- Built: 1847
- Architectural style: Greek Revival, Classical Revival
- NRHP reference No.: 15001039
- VLR No.: 053-0091

Significant dates
- Added to NRHP: February 2, 2016
- Designated VLR: December 10, 2016

The Oakham Farm is a historic farm at 23226 Oakham Farm Lane, near Middleburg in Loudoun County, Virginia. The farm includes 100 acres (40 ha) of land north of United States Route 50, with its building complex anchored by a farmhouse built in 1847 and repeatedly altered. The main portion of the farmhouse is a 1920s three-story Classical Revival block, which has the original 1847 two-story Greek Revival house attached as an ell to one side, along with another c. 1840 structure that may have functioned as a separate kitchen. The property was first developed by the Peyton family, with its present buildings dating to the ownership of the Rogers family. During the American Civil War, Oakham was where the irregular Confederate Army unit known as Mosby's Rangers was organized.

The farm was listed on the National Register of Historic Places in 2016.

== See also ==
- National Register of Historic Places listings in Loudoun County, Virginia
