= Stoke (Loudoun County, Virginia) =

Historic house in Virginia, United States

- U.S. National Register of Historic Places
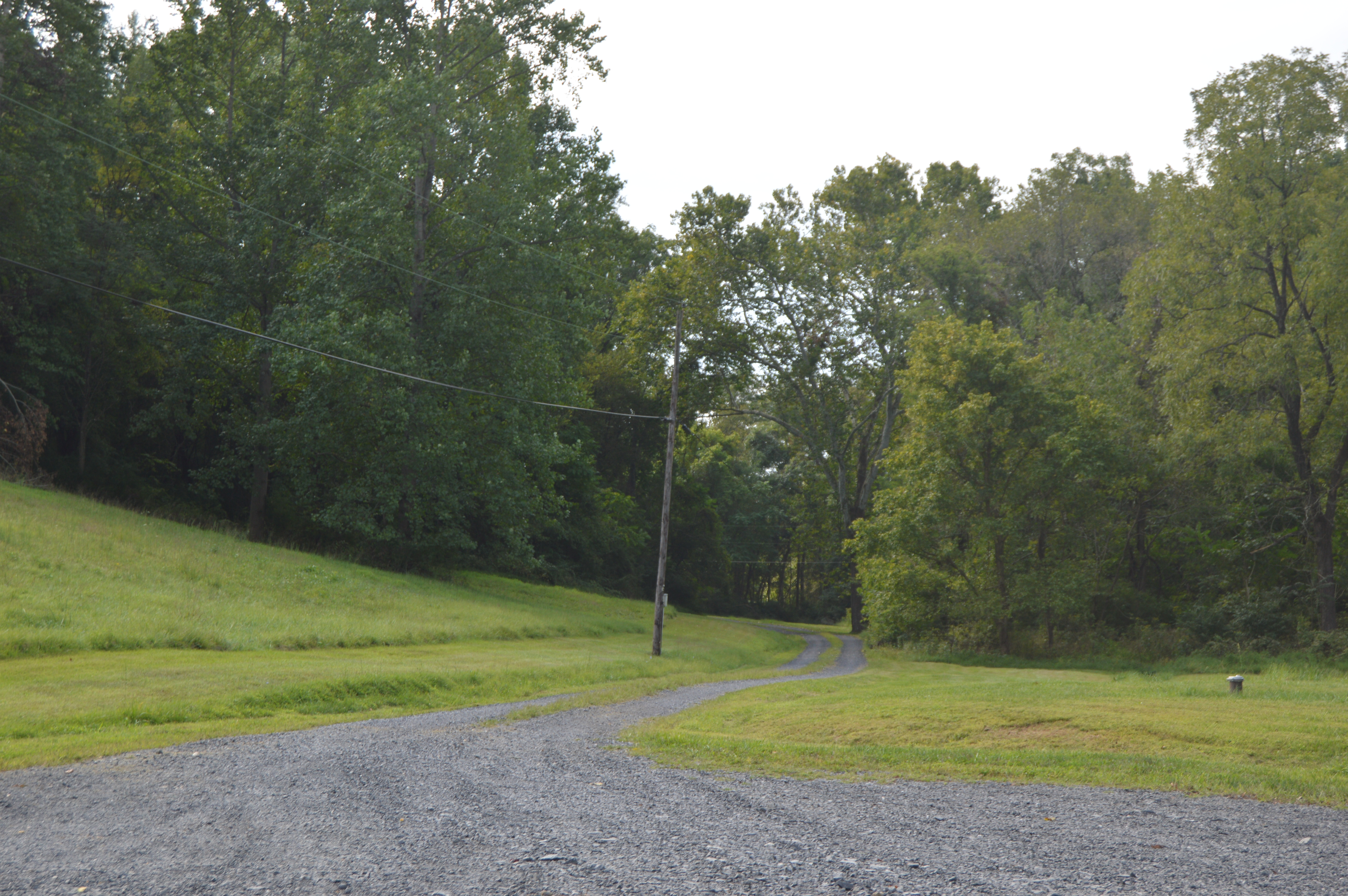
- Property entrance

- Location within Northern Virginia Location within Virginia Location within the United States
- Location: 23587 Stoke Farm Ln., near Aldie, Virginia
- Coordinates: 38°57′58″N 77°39′56″W
- Area: 165 acres (67 ha)
- Built: c. 1840
- Architectural style: Greek Revival; Renaissance Revival
- NRHP reference No.: 15000878
- Added to NRHP: December 8, 2015

Stoke is a historic farm property at 23587 Stoke Farm Lane in rural Loudoun County, Virginia, near the hamlet of Aldie. Its main house, set one mile down the entrance drive, is an 1840 Greek Revival farmhouse that underwent a major transformation in 1907 in the Renaissance Revival style. The property includes an early 20th-century swimming pool, tennis court, and landscaped garden with wall fountain, in addition to a complex of farm outbuildings, many dating to the 1920s. The gardens were developed by noted horticulturalist Eleanor Truax Harris.

The property was listed on the National Register of Historic Places in 2015.

== See also ==
- National Register of Historic Places listings in Loudoun County, Virginia
