= Murray Hill (Loudoun County, Virginia) =

Historic house in Virginia, United States

- U.S. National Register of Historic Places
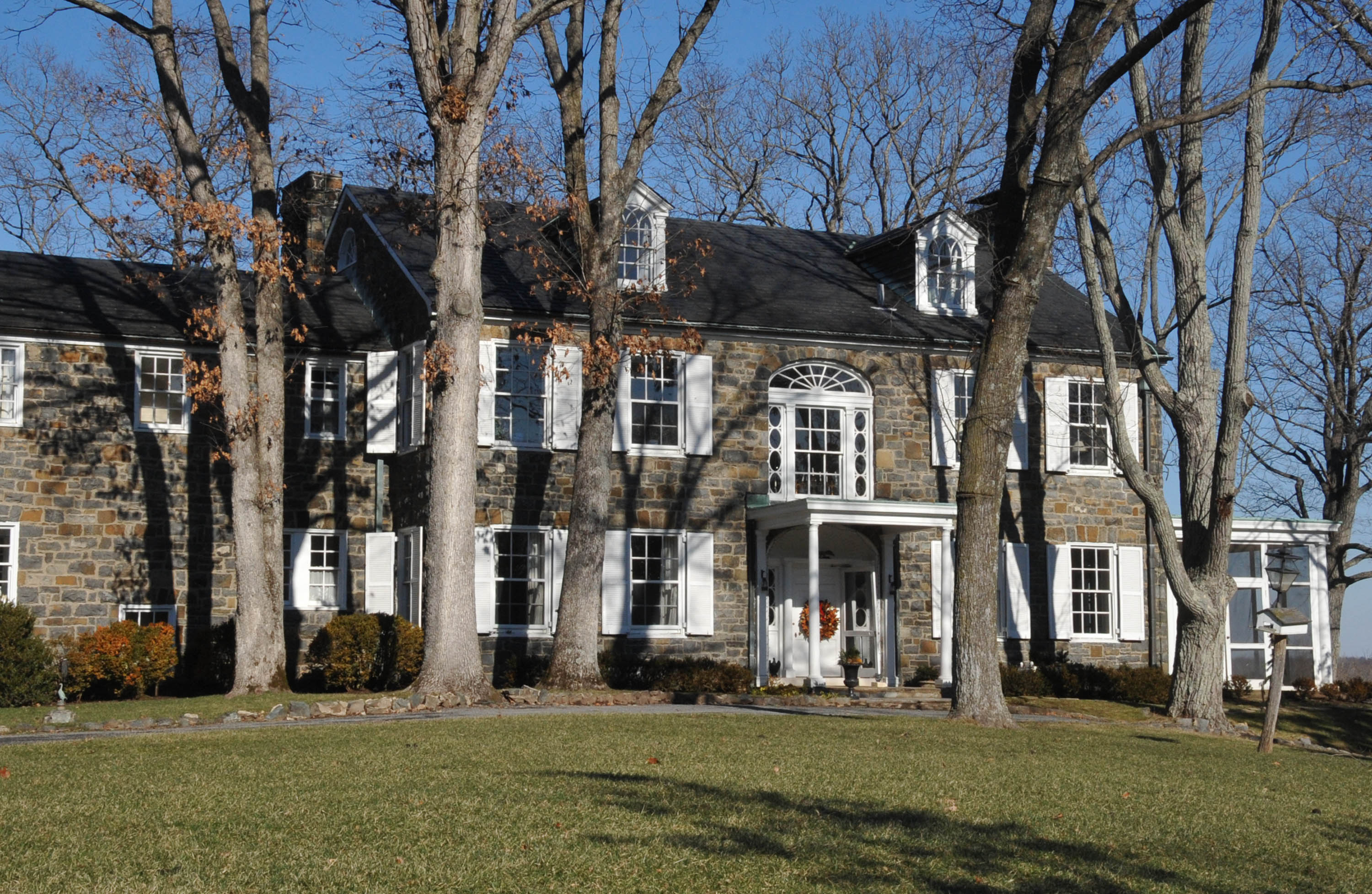

- Location within Northern Virginia Location within Virginia Location within the United States
- Location: 42910 Edwards Ferry Rd., near Leesburg, Virginia
- Coordinates: 39°6′49″N 77°31′0″W
- Area: 56.7 acres (22.9 ha)
- Built: 1938
- Architect: Lind & Murdock; Thomas Swann, Jr.
- Architectural style: Greek Revival
- NRHP reference No.: 14000945
- Added to NRHP: November 19, 2014

Murray Hill is an estate at 42910 Edwards Ferry Road, in Loudoun County, Virginia near Leesburg. Just shy of 57 acres (23 ha), the property includes a 1938 Colonial Revival house, as well as an early 19th-century log dwelling and a number of agricultural outbuildings dating mostly to the 19th century. The main house was built by Stirling Murray Rust, and is a conscious emulation of his family's homestead Rockland, located a few miles away. The estate is within the bounds of the theater of the American Civil War Battle of Ball's Bluff; artifacts related to military movements around the battle have been found on the property, as is a portion of a roadway used by Union forces.

The property was listed on the National Register of Historic Places in 2014.

== See also ==
- National Register of Historic Places listings in Loudoun County, Virginia
