= Old Stone Church Archeological Site =

Archaeological site in Virginia, United States

- Old Stone Church Archeological Site (44LD376)
- U.S. National Register of Historic Places
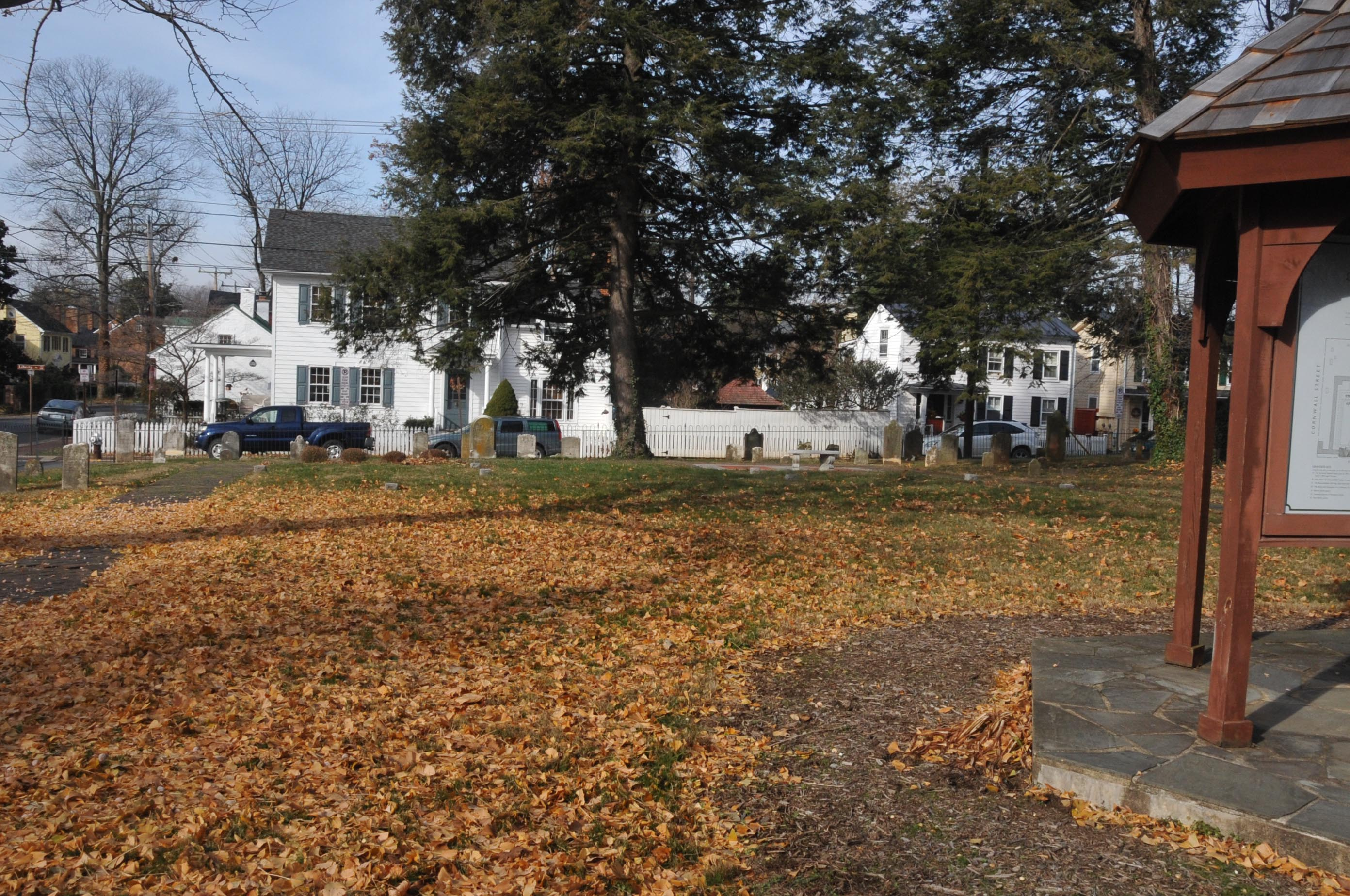

- Location within Northern Virginia Location within Virginia Location within the United States
- Nearest city: Leesburg, Virginia
- Coordinates: 39°7′2″N 77°33′56″W
- Area: 0.5 acres (0.20 ha)
- Built: 1785
- NRHP reference No.: 89001402
- Added to NRHP: September 7, 1989

The Old Stone Church Site encompasses a location in Leesburg, Virginia that was the site of property of the Methodist church from c. 1770 to 1900. On May 11, 1766, Nicholas Minor, a founder of the new town of Leesburg, deeded a half acre of property to Robert Hamilton, a Methodist convert, for ″four pounds current money of Virginia, for no other use but for a church or meeting house and grave yard.″ The site is the earliest known Methodist-owned church site in America. On September 28, 1768, the deed was delivered to members of the Methodist society. The deed, recorded in Deed Book L at pages 451–453, may be seen today in the Clerk's office of the Loudoun Courthouse.

Soon thereafter a soft stone building was erected. It was replaced in the late 1780s by a larger structure, which was further enlarged in the early 1800s. The mixed-race congregation split in the late 1840s over the issue of slavery, and a legal battle began for control over the building. In 1897 a Loudoun County court ordered the property to be sold and the proceeds to be divided between the two congregations. The church was demolished c. 1900 and its building materials used elsewhere in the city. The site was purchased in 1961 by the Virginia Conference of the Methodist Church as a historic landmark.

The site was listed on the National Register of Historic Places in 1989.

== See also ==
- National Register of Historic Places listings in Loudoun County, Virginia
- Leesburg United Methodist Church
- Thomas Balch Library Collection Number M 062
