= Little River Turnpike Bridge =

- U.S. National Register of Historic Places
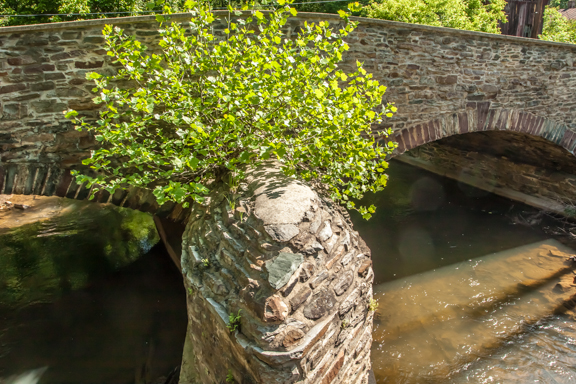
- Little River Turnpike Bridge over US 50 in Aldie, showing both arches and parapet wall

- Location within Northern Virginia Location within Virginia
- Nearest city: US 50 – Aldie
- Coordinates: 38°58′31″N 77°38′22″W
- Built: 1826
- NRHP reference No.: 14000148
- Added to NRHP: April 11, 2014

The Little River Turnpike Bridge carries U.S. Route 50 (US 50) across the Little River near Aldie in Loudoun County, Virginia. The bridge was listed on the National Register of Historic Places in 2014.

== History ==
The two-arch masonry bridge was built in 1826 by the Little River Turnpike Company, which built the roadway that is now US 50. The costs of the bridge were apparently shared between that company and the Ashley's Gap Turnpike Company. It is one of a small number of masonry arch bridges still carrying a major through road in the state. It is about 108 feet (33 m) long and 23 feet (7.0 m) wide.

The bridge has received only modest visible modifications since its construction. Concrete caps have been installed on upper surface elements, and the arch underside has also been protected with shotcrete. The upstream central pier has had a concrete fender added to protect it from debris and scouring. The downstream parapet wall was damaged by a truck in 1998 and reconstructed, and in 2004 reinforcing metal rods were injected into the rubble of the bridge to help distribute the active load. As of 2017, the bridge has a posted maximum load limit of forty tons.

== See also ==
- List of bridges on the National Register of Historic Places in Virginia
- National Register of Historic Places listings in Loudoun County, Virginia
