= Rock Spring Farm =

Historic house in Virginia, United States

- U.S. National Register of Historic Places
- Virginia Landmarks Register
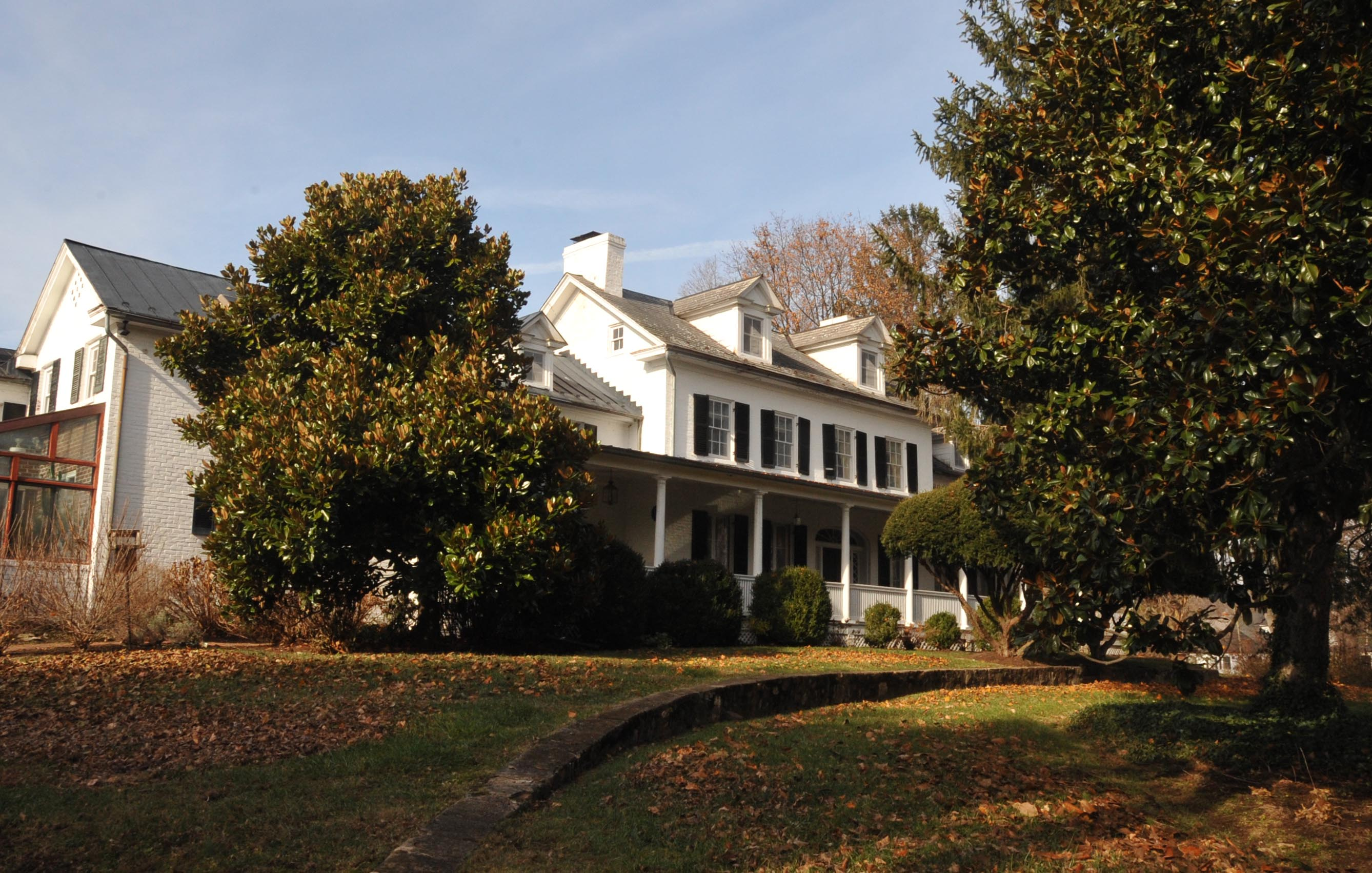

- Location within Northern Virginia Location within Virginia Location within the United States
- Location: 329 Loudoun St. SW, Leesburg, Virginia
- Coordinates: 39°6′58″N 77°34′29″W
- Area: 5.5 acres (2.2 ha)
- Built: c. 1826, 1906
- Architectural style: Federal, Colonial Revival
- NRHP reference No.: 02000177
- VLR No.: 253-5046

Significant dates
- Added to NRHP: March 13, 2002
- Designated VLR: December 5, 2001

Rock Spring Farm is a historic home located at Leesburg, Loudoun County, Virginia. The original section of the house was built about 1826, with wing and one-story addition built about 1906, and hyphen in 1980 to connect to the original brick kitchen. It consists of a 2 1/2-story, four-bay, brick main block in the Federal style with a two-story rear ell and flanking wings. The house was updated near the turn of the 20th century with Colonial Revival-style details. Also on the property are a contributing spring house, smokehouse, barn, dairy, silo, tractor shed, and stable.

It was listed on the National Register of Historic Places in 2002.

It housed a dairy operation until 1977 and served as Leesburg's main source of water until the 1980s; it ceased to be a working farm in 2025.

In March 2026, the City of Leesburg narrowly approved a $5.78 million purchase of the farm from Jack Cook following the death of his wife, Agnes diZerega Cook, who had hoped that it would become parkland.

Vice Mayor Todd Cimino-Johnson opposed the purchase, stating that the town had agreed to pay "double what the appraisal says."
