= Sleepy Hollow Farm =

Historic house in Virginia, United States

- U.S. National Register of Historic Places
- Virginia Landmarks Register
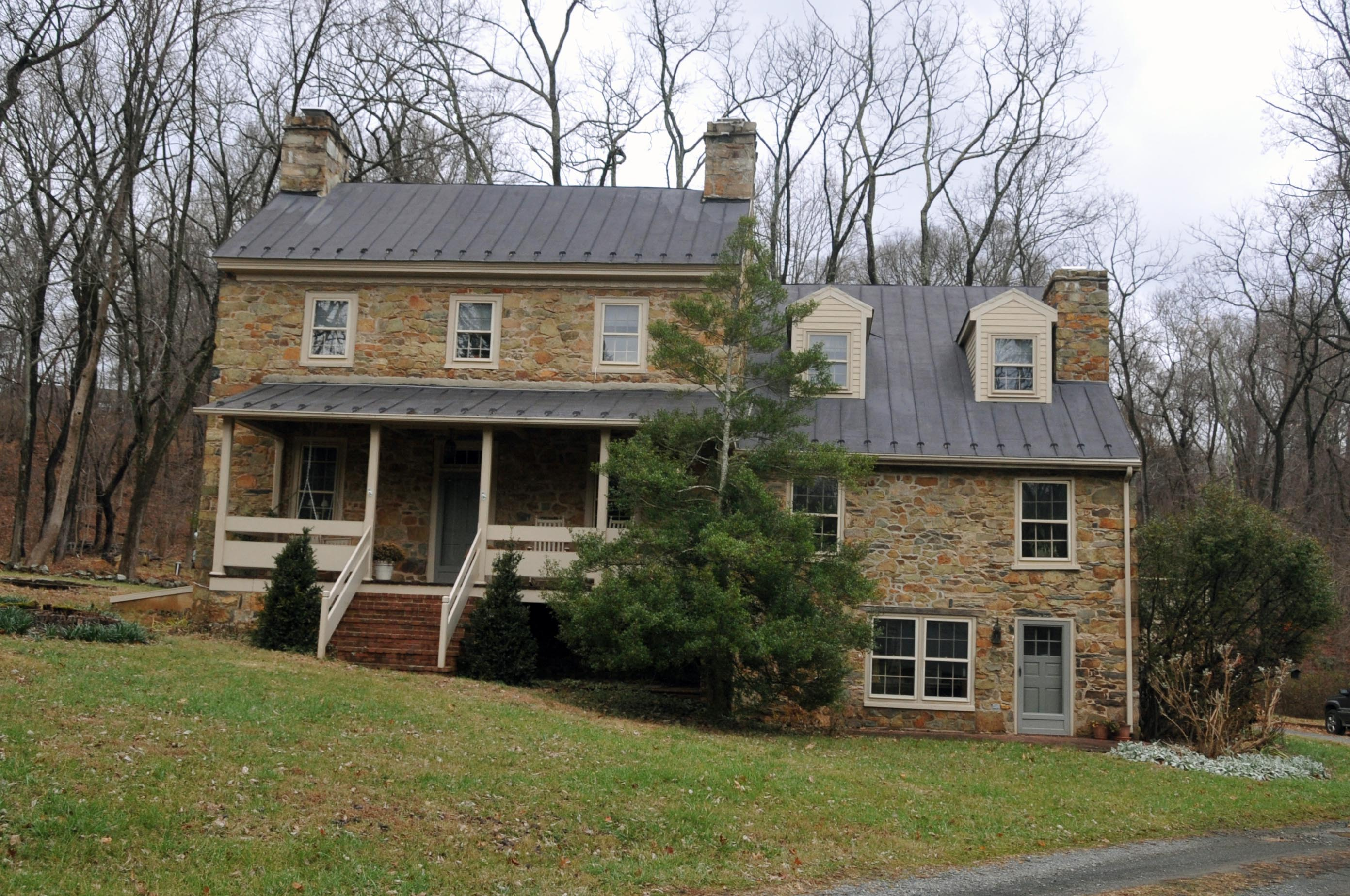

- Location within Northern Virginia Location within Virginia Location within the United States
- Location: 39902 Thomas Mill Rd., Leesburg, Virginia
- Coordinates: 39°6′57″N 77°37′26″W
- Area: 14.5 acres (5.9 ha)
- Built: 1769, c. 1820
- Architectural style: Colonial, Federal
- NRHP reference No.: 07000048
- VLR No.: 053-0273

Significant dates
- Added to NRHP: February 13, 2007
- Designated VLR: September 6, 2006

Sleepy Hollow Farm is a historic home located near Leesburg, Loudoun County, Virginia. The house was built in two phases, one in 1769 and another about 1820. The original section is a two-story, side-gable, three-bay, stone dwelling with a side gable roof. The interior exhibits stylistic influences of the Federal style. Attached to it is a one-story, two-bay, stone addition built about 1820. It has a one-story section added about 1980. Also on the property is a contributing stone spring house.

It was listed on the National Register of Historic Places in 2007.
