= Clapham's Ferry =

Historic house in Virginia, United States

- U.S. National Register of Historic Places
- Virginia Landmarks Register
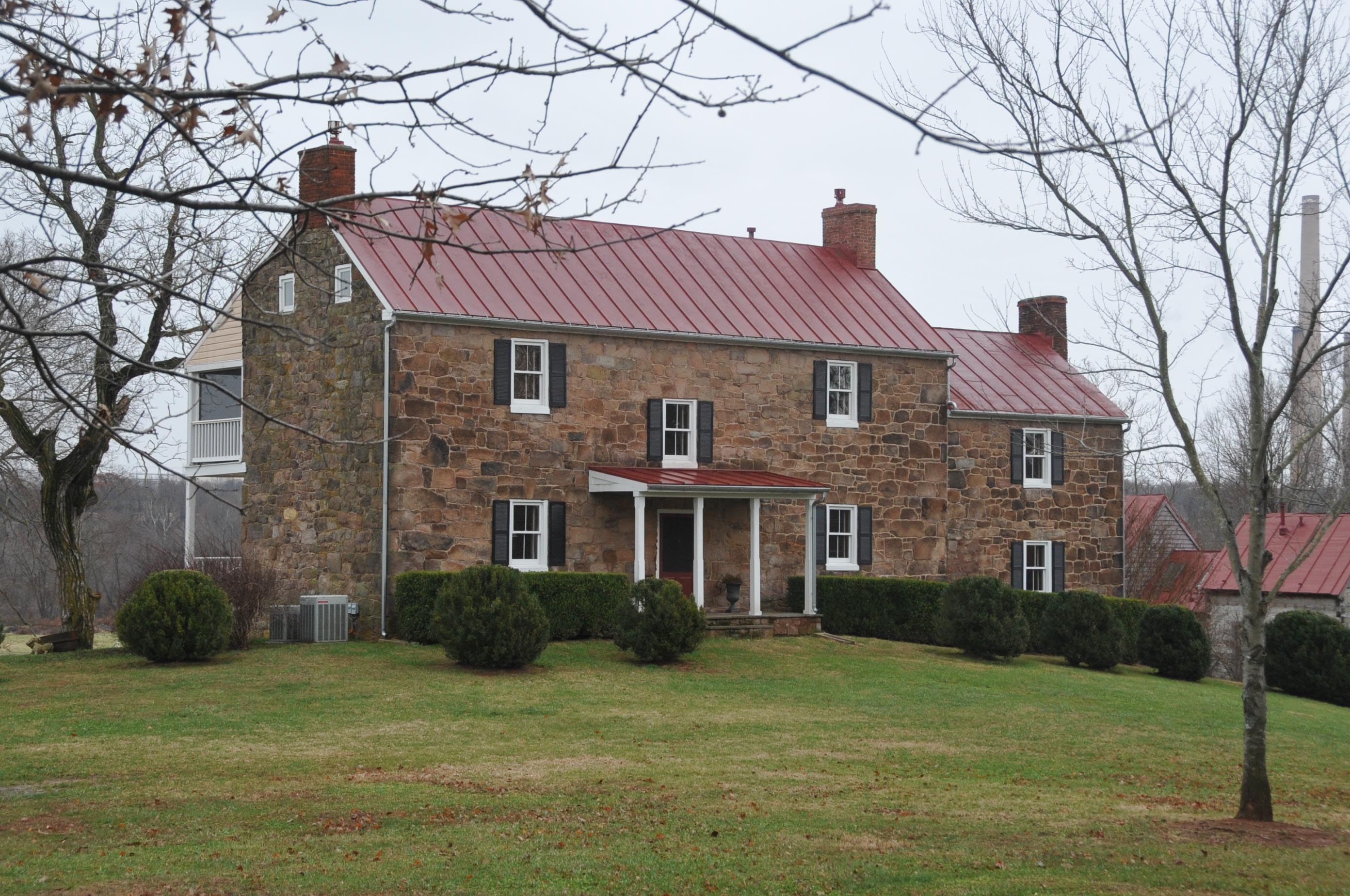

- Location within Northern Virginia Location within Virginia Location within the United States
- Location: 44344 E. Spinks Ferry Rd., Leesburg, Virginia
- Coordinates: 39°13′19″N 77°27′52″W
- Area: 354.9 acres (143.6 ha)
- Architectural style: Federal
- NRHP reference No.: 97001076
- VLR No.: 053-0071

Significant dates
- Added to NRHP: September 4, 1997
- Designated VLR: March 19, 1997

Clapham's Ferry, also known as Spinks Ferry, Lost Corner Farm, and Riverside, is a historic home located near Leesburg, Loudoun County, Virginia. It consists of a 2 1/2-story, three-bay, Federal style main block of red sandstone, with a two-story sandstone kitchen addition built about 1849. It has a standing seam metal gable roof. Also on the property are the contributing log kitchen building, meat house, bank barn, corn crib, and tenant house. The property is also historically significant as the site of an early ferry crossing connecting Loudoun County, Virginia, with Maryland.

It was listed on the National Register of Historic Places in 1997.
