= Fair Oaks (Aldie, Virginia) =

- U.S. National Register of Historic Places
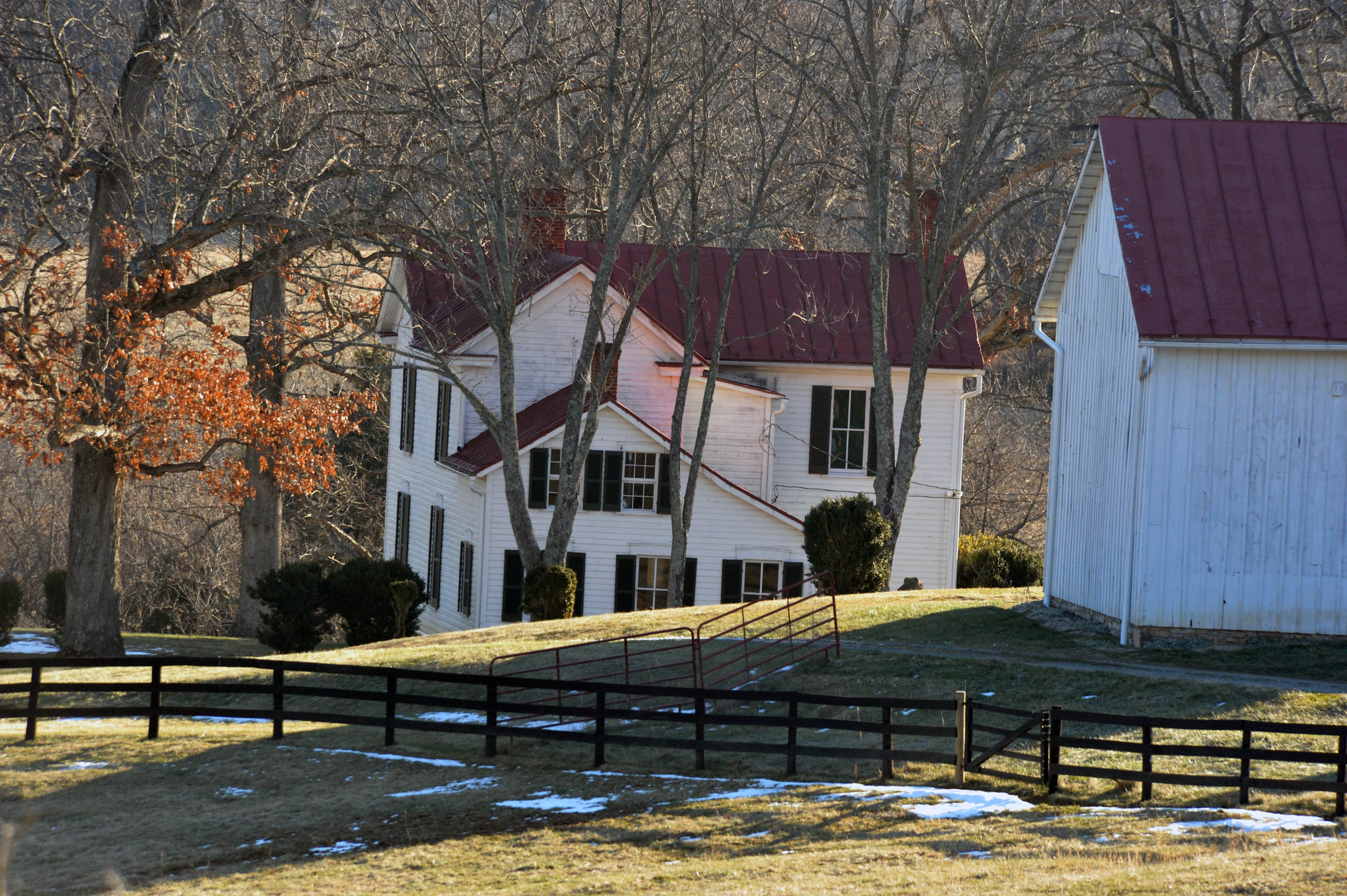
- House

- Location within Northern Virginia Location within Virginia Location within the United States
- Nearest city: Aldie, Virginia
- Coordinates: 38°57′46″N 77°38′0″W
- Area: 91 acres (37 ha)
- Built: 1881
- Architectural style: Italianate
- NRHP reference No.: 13001171
- Added to NRHP: February 5, 2014

Fair Oaks is a historic farmstead at 23718 New Mountain Rd. in Loudoun County, Virginia, near the village of Aldie. The 2 1/2-story wood-frame Italianate style house was built in 1881 by Alexander Moore, whose family operated the Aldie Mill for many years. The most prominent exterior decorative feature is the front porch, which features a delicately scroll-sawn balustrade and decorative brackets. Most of its interior woodwork has been preserved. The farmstead includes three other buildings dating to the same period, as well as the 1844 Moore family cemetery.

The property was listed on the National Register of Historic Places in 2014.

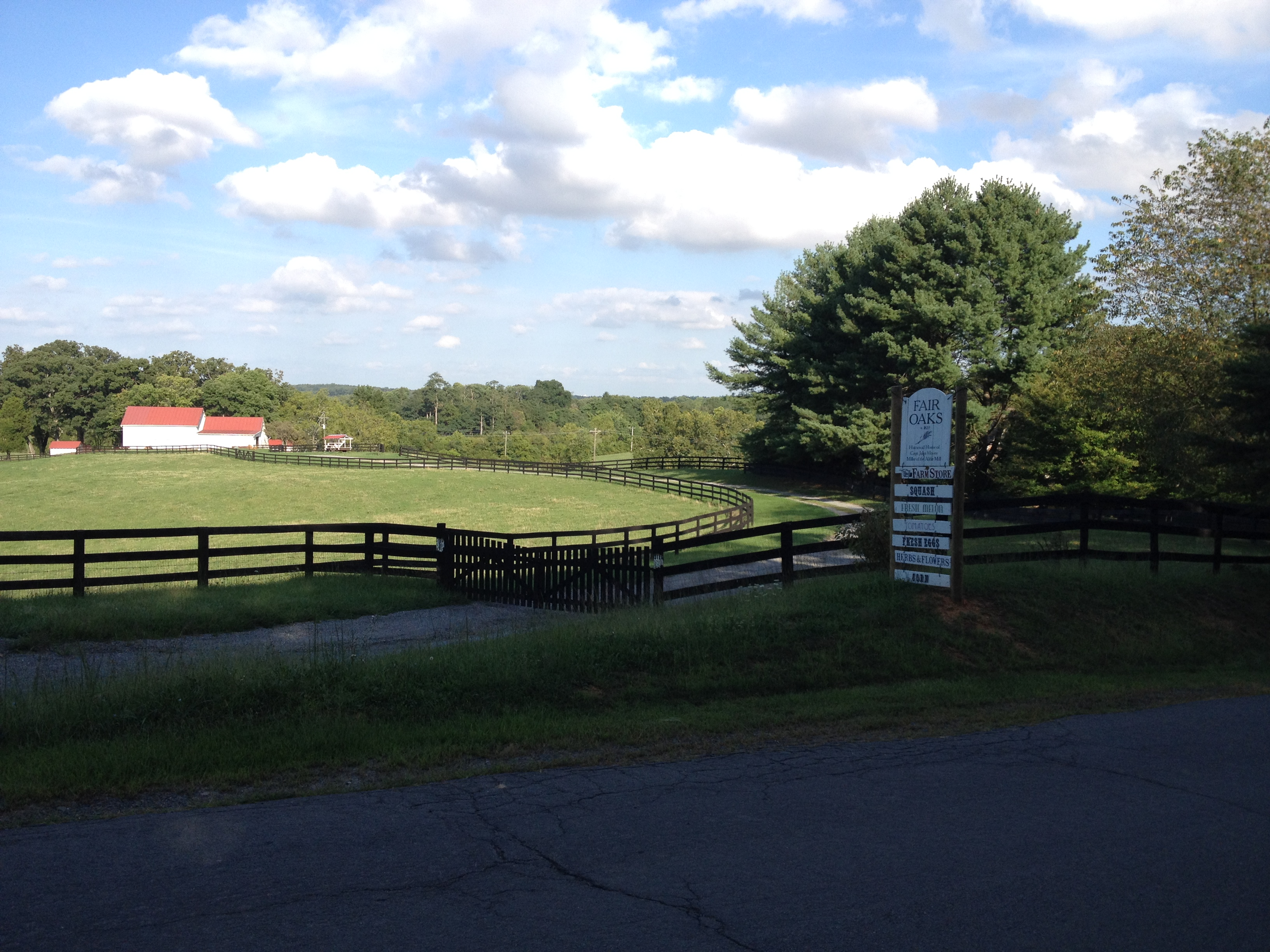
Barn

== See also ==
- National Register of Historic Places listings in Loudoun County, Virginia
