= Fair Oaks =

Fair Oaks may refer to:

== Places in the United States ==
- Fair Oaks, Arkansas
- Fair Oaks, California, in Sacramento County
- Fair Oaks, San Joaquin County, California, a place in California
- Fair Oaks (VTA), a light rail station in Sunnyvale, California
- Fair Oaks – Manhattan Manor, a neighborhood in Tampa, Florida
- Fair Oaks, Georgia
- Fair Oaks, Indiana
- Fair Oaks (Natchez, Mississippi), a historic house
- Fair Oaks, New York
- Fair Oaks, Oklahoma
- Fair Oaks, Oregon
- Fair Oaks (Aldie, Virginia), a historic farmstead
- Fair Oaks, Fairfax County, Virginia
  - Fair Oaks Mall, a mall in Fairfax, Virginia
- Fair Oaks, Henrico County, Virginia
- Fair Oaks, Wisconsin, a former village which was annexed by the city of Madison, Wisconsin, in 1913

== Other uses ==
- Fair Oaks, a 1957 novel by Frank Yerby

== See also ==
- Fair Oak, a town in the borough of Eastleigh, Hampshire, England
- Fairoaks Airport in Surrey, England
- Battle of Fair Oaks & Darbytown Road, an America Civil War battle
- Battle of Seven Pines or Battle of Fair Oaks, an American Civil War battle
