= Vestal's Gap Road and Lanesville Historic District =

Historic district in Virginia, United States

- U.S. National Register of Historic Places
- U.S. Historic district
- Virginia Landmarks Register
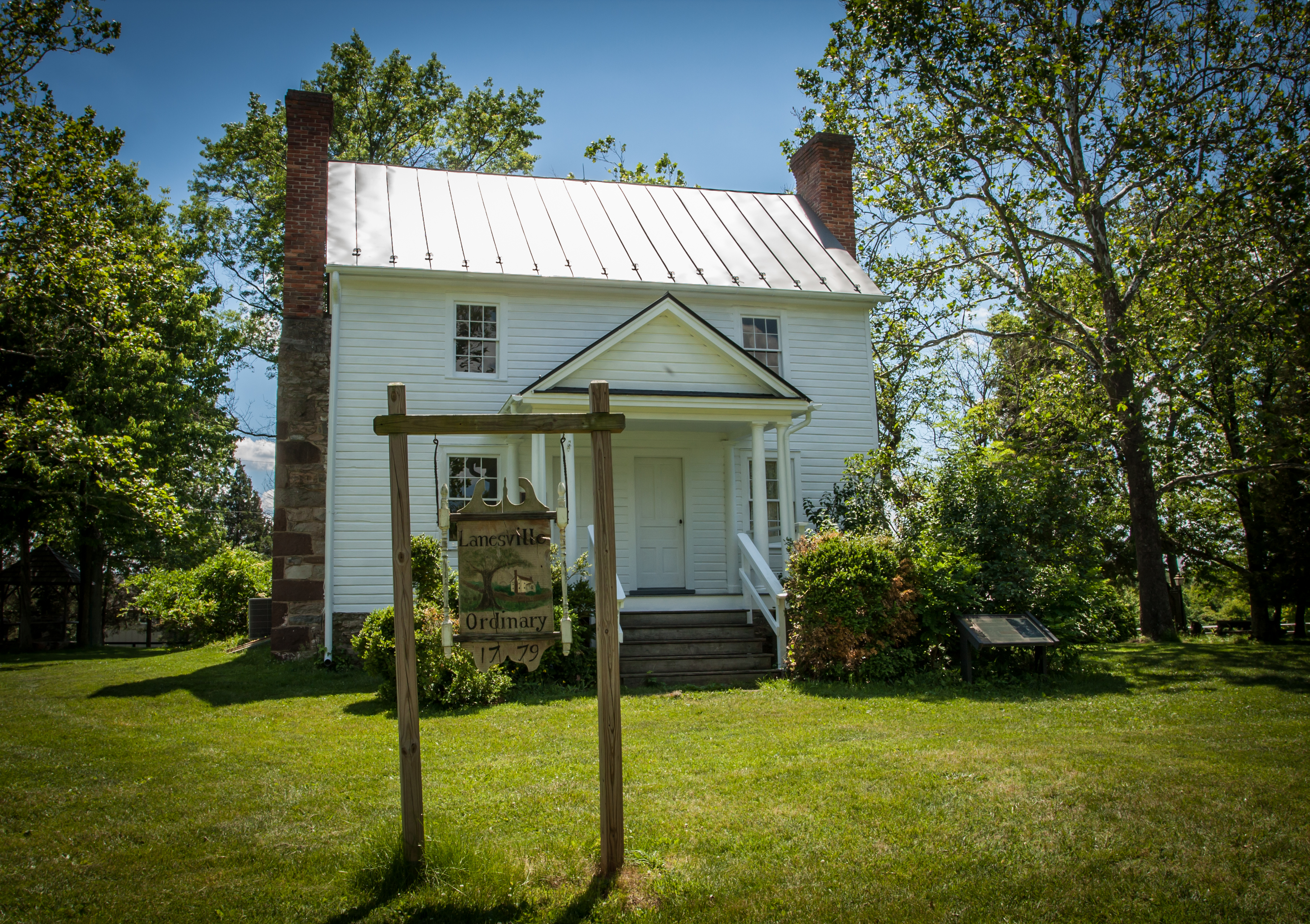
- frame house in Lanesville Historic District

- Location within Northern Virginia Location within Virginia Location within the United States
- Location: 21544 Cascades Pkwy., Sterling, Virginia
- Coordinates: 39°1′3″N 77°24′11″W
- Area: 7.5 acres (3.0 ha)
- Built: c. 1807
- Architectural style: Early Republic
- NRHP reference No.: 99001722
- VLR No.: 053-0498

Significant dates
- Added to NRHP: February 3, 2000
- Designated VLR: September 15, 1999

Vestal's Gap Road and Lanesville Historic District is a national historic district located in Claude Moore Park at Sterling, Loudoun County, Virginia. It encompasses 1 contributing building and 1 contributing structure. They are "Lanesville," a two-story side-gabled frame house on a solid stone-rubble foundation built about 1807, and a section of the former Vestal's Gap Road, an 18th-century road.

It was listed on the National Register of Historic Places in 2000.

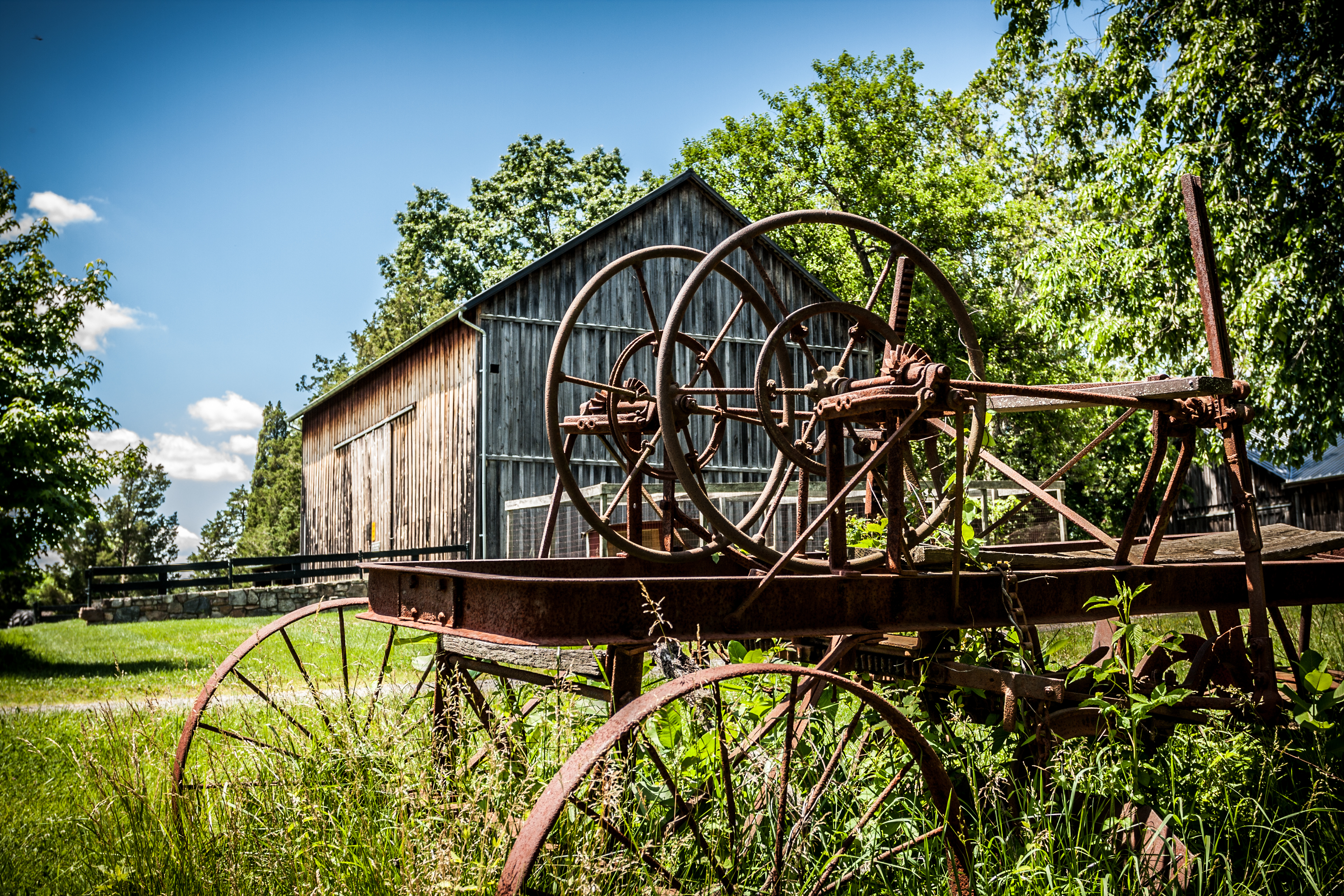
Barn

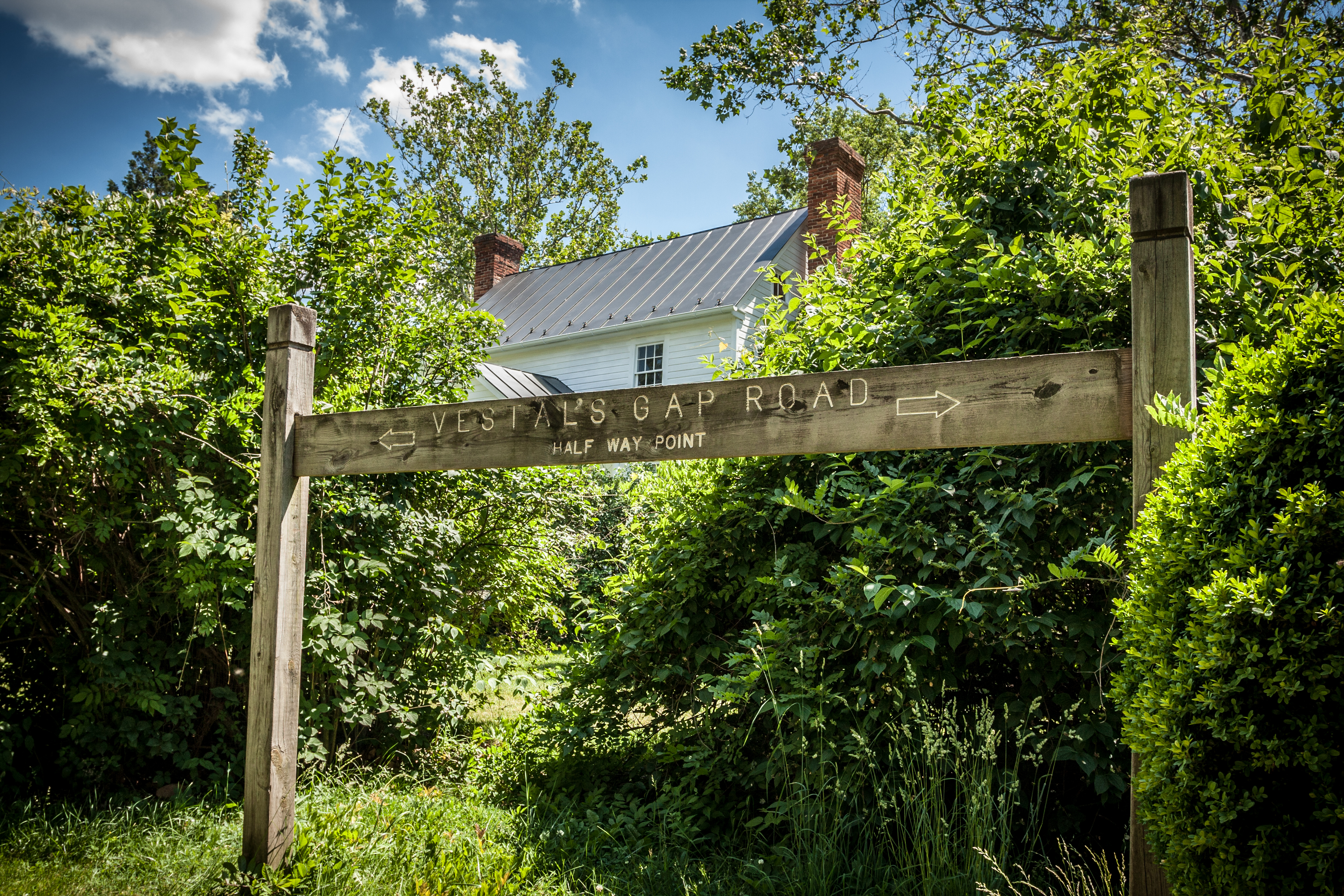
Road midpoint

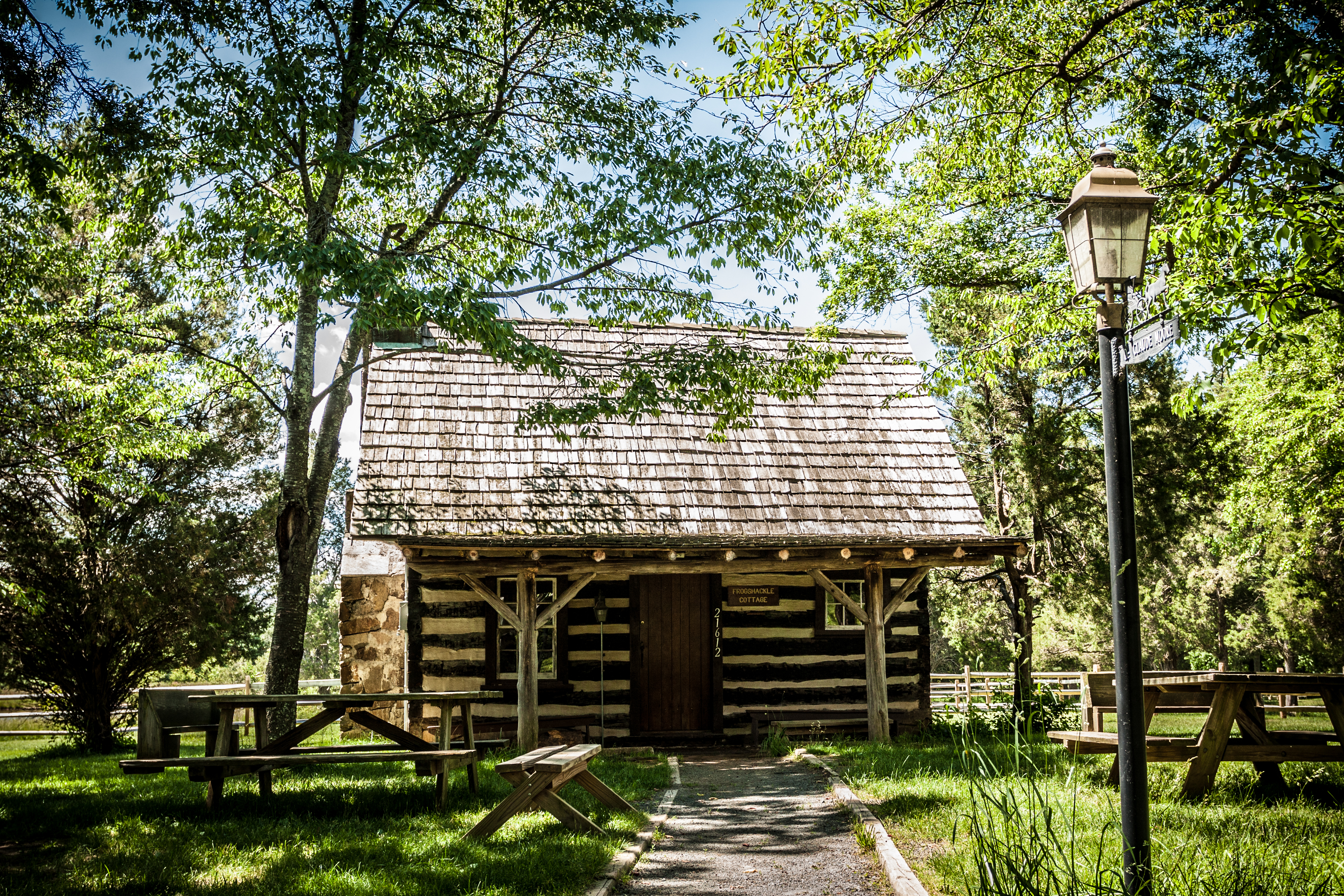
Log cabin

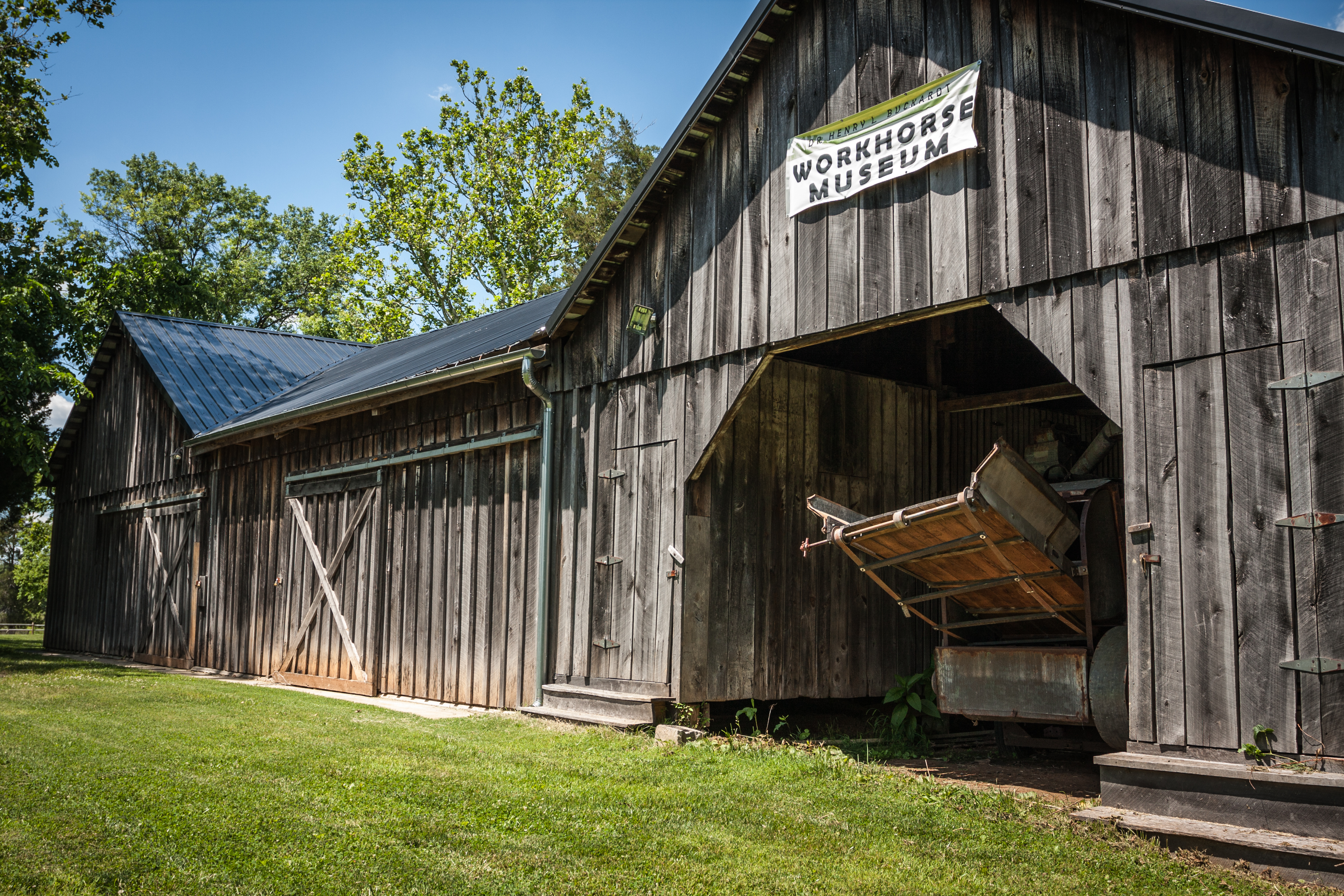
Workhorse museum

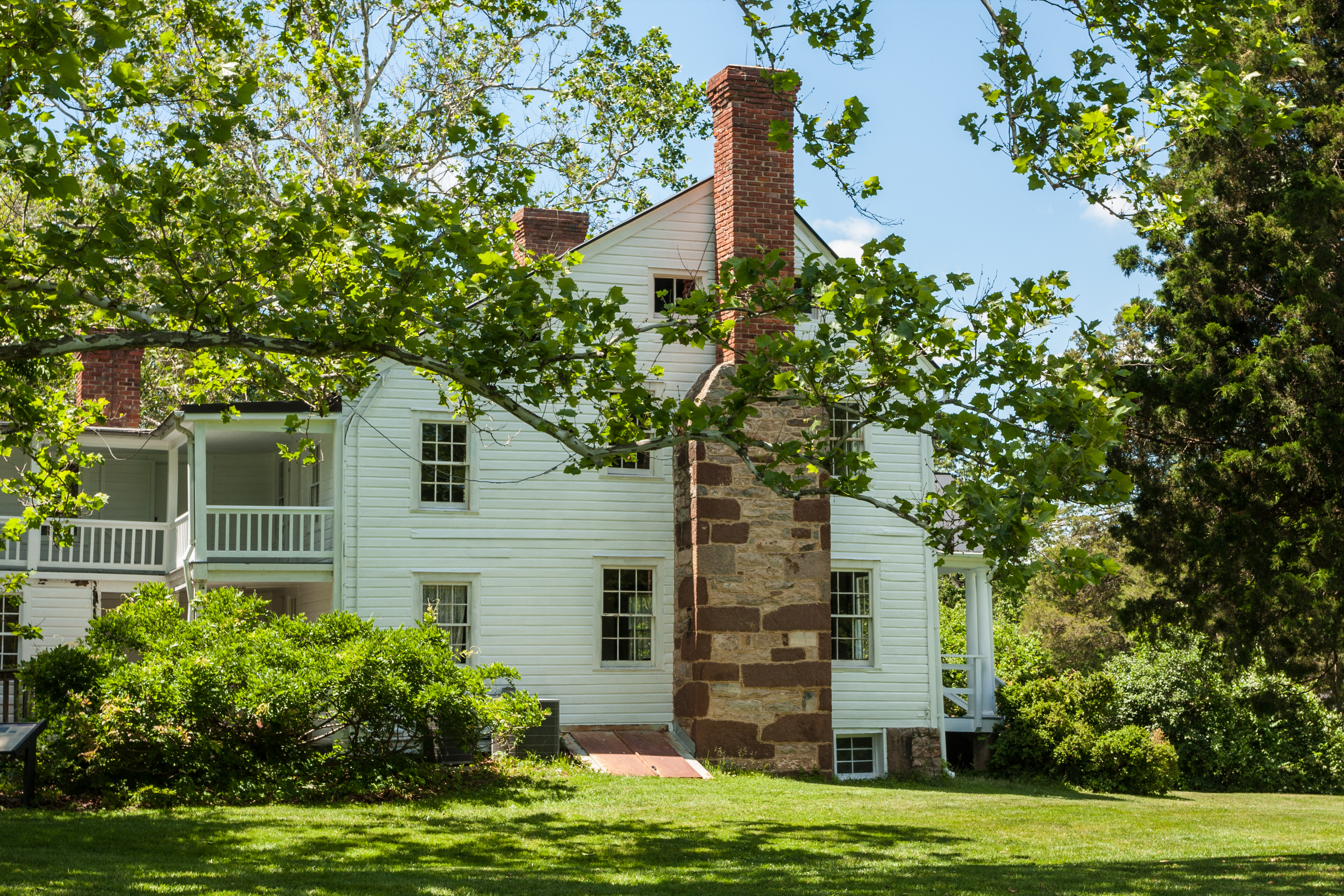
House

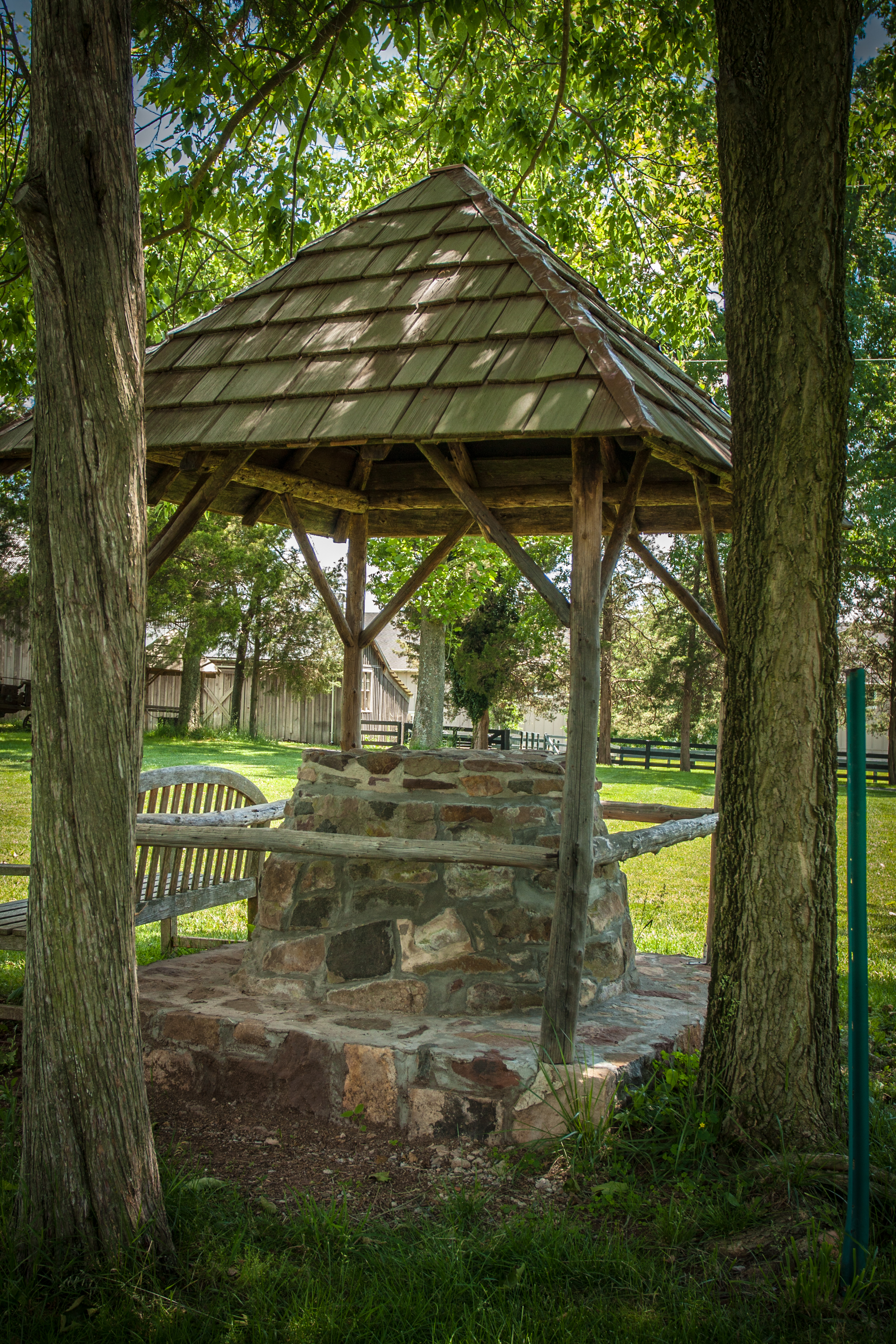
Well

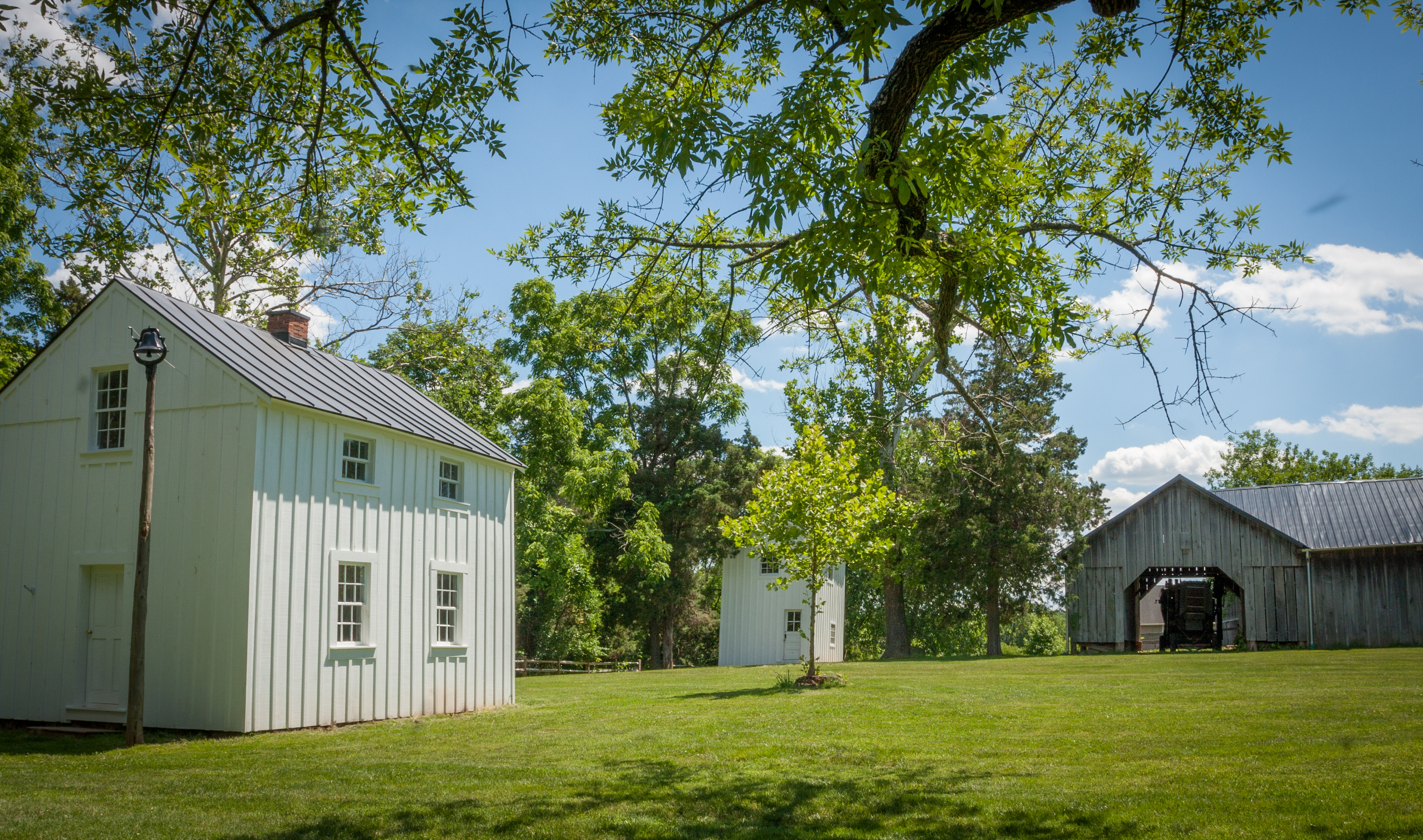

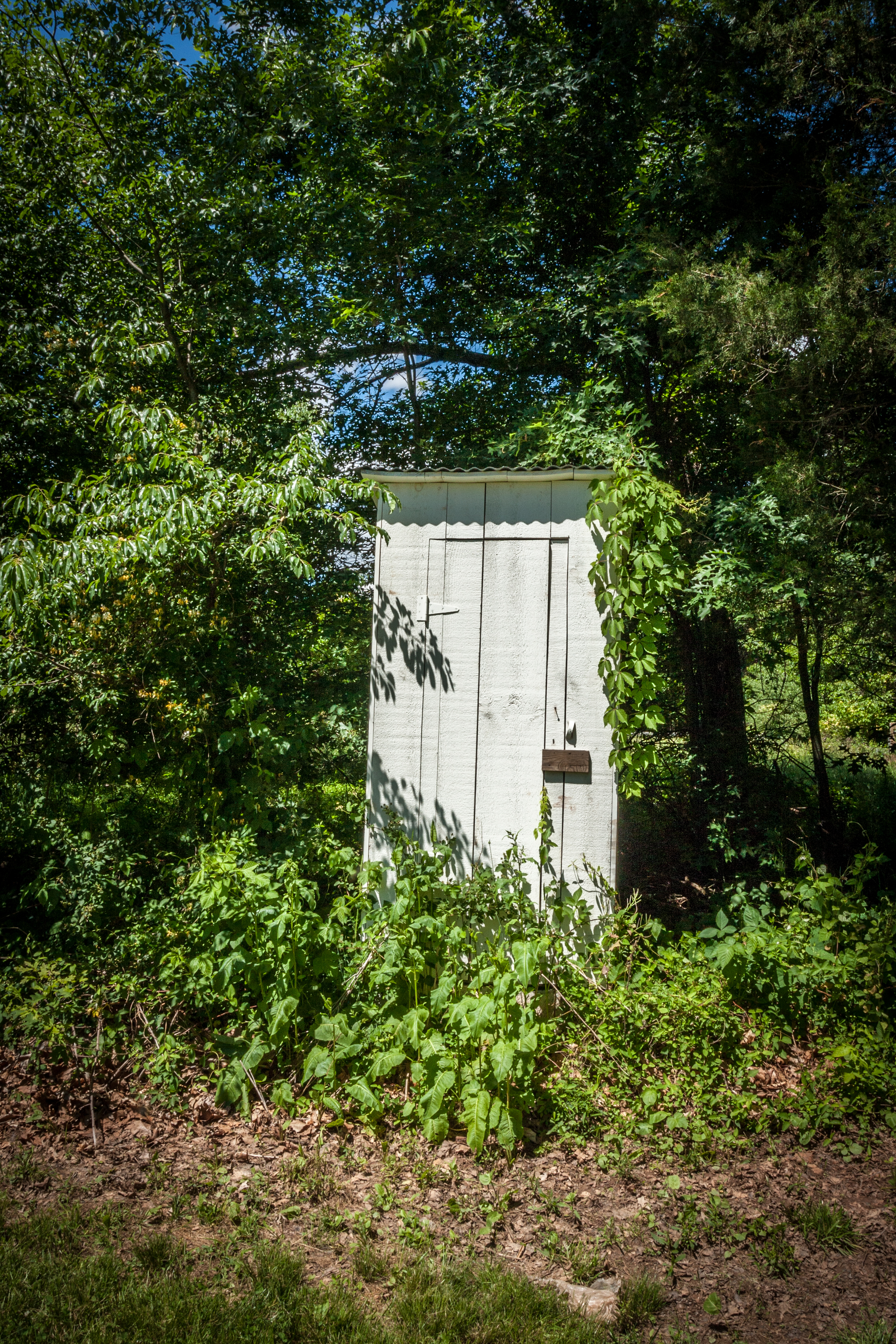
Outhouse

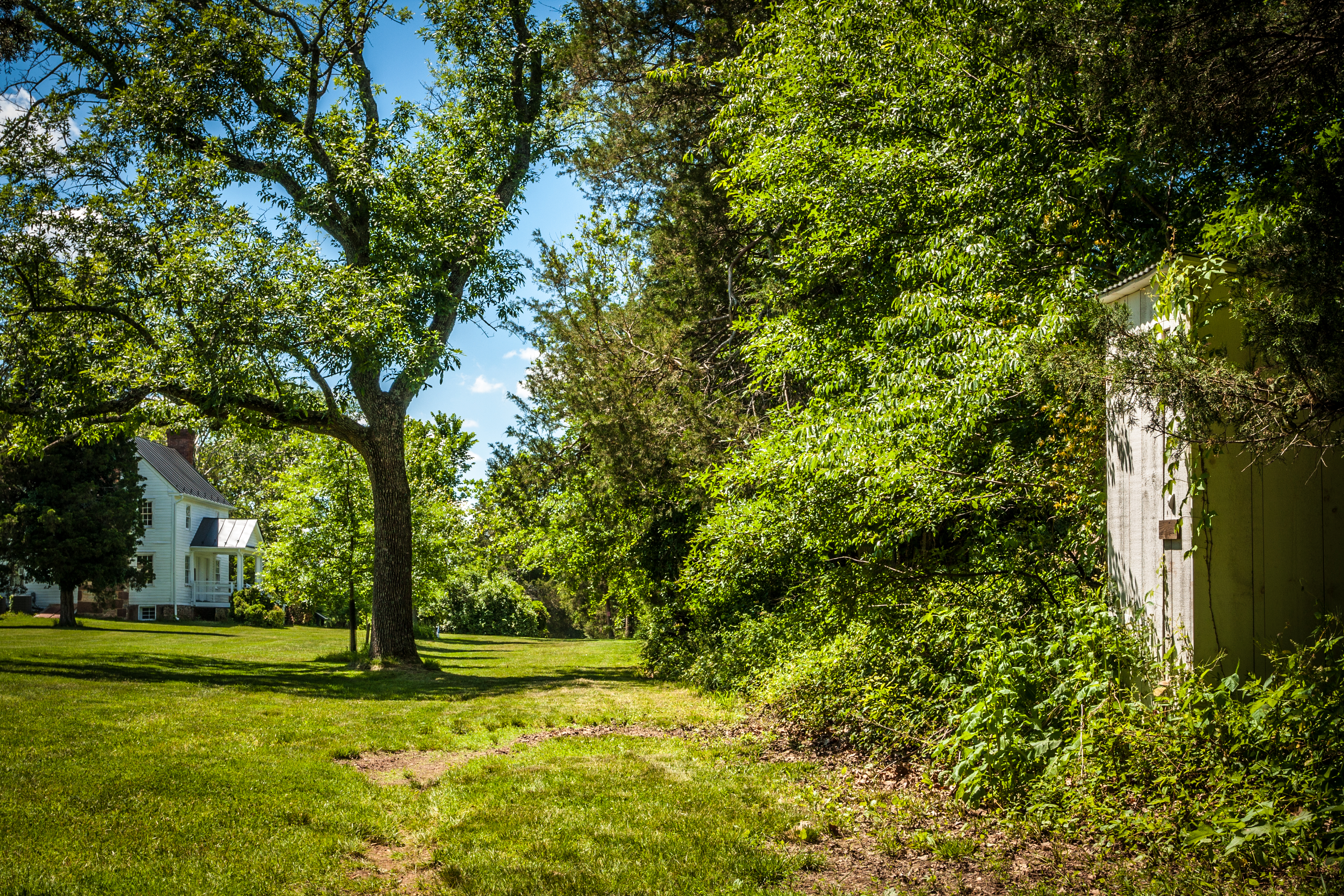
Road
