= Myrtle Hall Farm =

Historic house in Virginia, United States

- U.S. National Register of Historic Places
- Virginia Landmarks Register
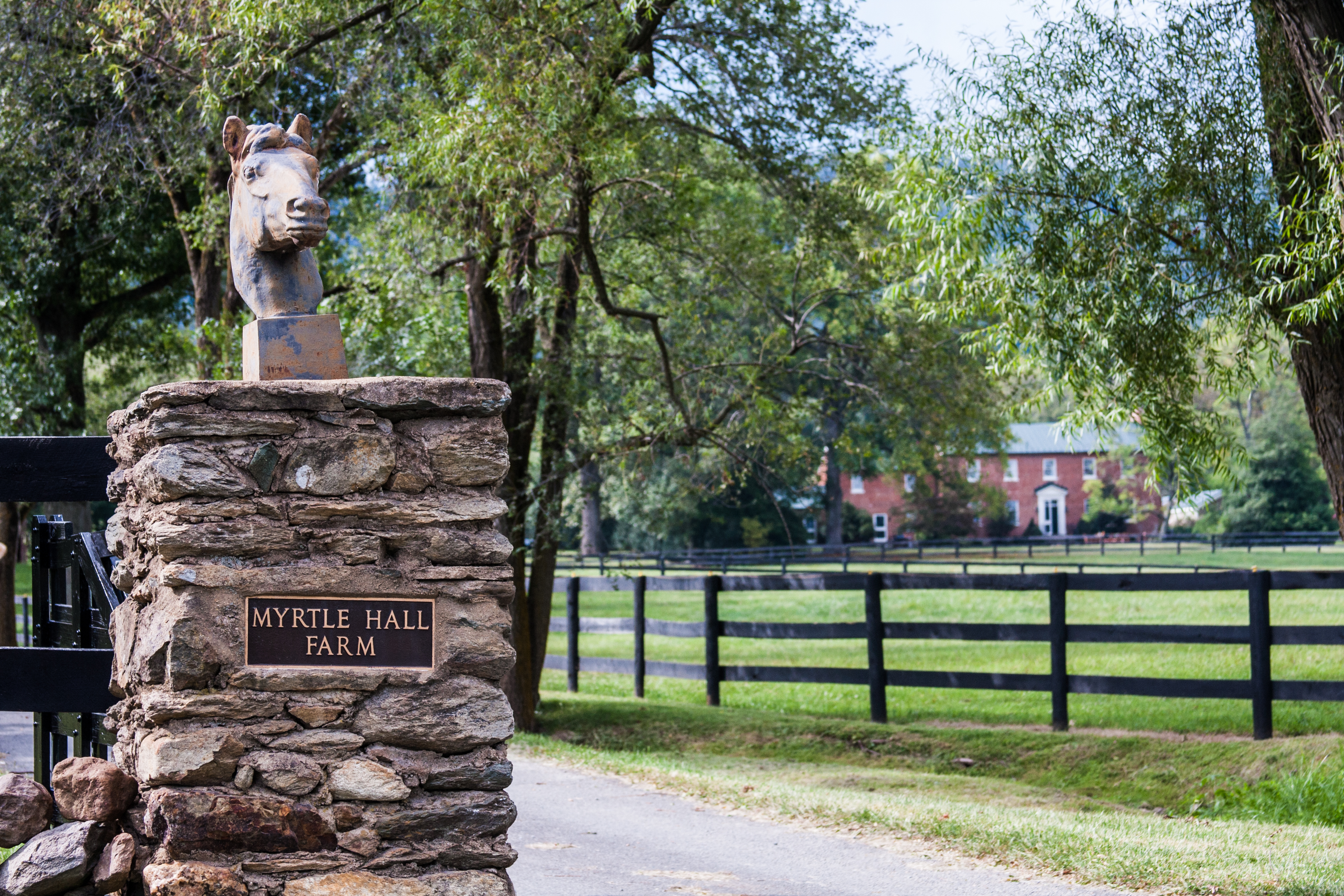
- Entry, Myrtle Hall Farm, September 2012

- Location within Northern Virginia Location within Virginia Location within the United States
- Location: 19305 Ridgeside Rd., Bluemont, Virginia
- Coordinates: 39°04′59″N 77°50′08″W
- Area: 40 acres (16 ha)
- Built: c. 1813
- Architectural style: Federal
- NRHP reference No.: 06000408
- VLR No.: 053-1059

Significant dates
- Added to NRHP: May 17, 2006
- Designated VLR: March 8, 2006

Myrtle Hall Farm, also known as Meadow Farm, is a historic plantation house and farm located near Bluemont, Loudoun County, Virginia. The original section of the house was built about 1813, and consists of a two-story, brick main block with a smaller two-story service wing and single story kitchen addition. A two-story library addition was built in about 1850. The house is in the Federal style. Also on the property are the contributing stone springhouse (c.1813), The Mordecai Throckmorton Family Cemetery, wood shed (c. 1850), stone-lined well (c. 1813), tenant house (1949), two-story guest house (1930, 1949), tennis court (c. 1949), and stone entry (c. 1949).

It was listed on the National Register of Historic Places in 2006.
