= Cleremont Farm =

Historic house in Virginia, United States

- U.S. National Register of Historic Places
- Virginia Landmarks Register
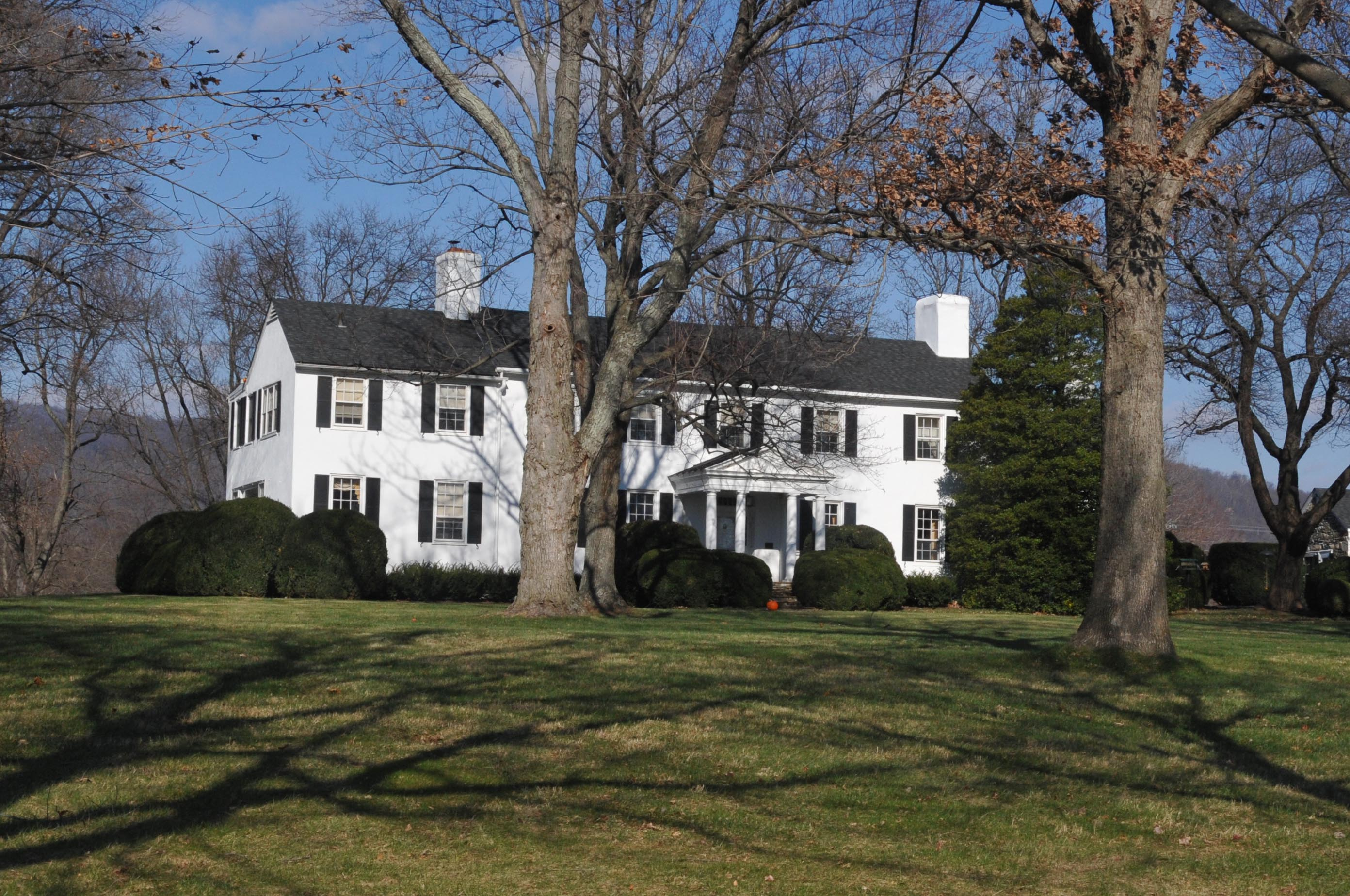

- Location within Northern Virginia Location within Virginia Location within the United States
- Location: East side of VA 619, 0.6 miles (0.97 km) northeast of VA 743, Upperville, Virginia
- Coordinates: 39°02′47″N 77°51′51″W
- Area: 107 acres (43 ha)
- Built: 1820
- Built by: Dew, William
- Architectural style: Federal, Colonial Revival
- NRHP reference No.: 96001627
- VLR No.: 053-1038

Significant dates
- Added to NRHP: January 25, 1997
- Designated VLR: June 19, 1996

Cleremont Farm is a historic home and farm located near Upperville, Loudoun County, Virginia. The original section of the house was built in two stages between about 1820 and 1835, and added onto subsequently in the 1870s. 1940s. and 1980s. It consists of a stone portion, a log portion, and a stone kitchen wing. It has a five bay, two-story, gable-roofed center section in the Federal style. A one-bay, one-story Colonial Revival-style pedimented entrance portico was built in the early 1940s. Also on the property are the contributing original 1 1/2-story, stuccoed stone dwelling (1761); a stone kitchen from the late 19th or early 20th century; a stuccoed frame tenant house built about 1940; a stone carriage mount; and a series of five stone walls.

It was listed on the National Register of Historic Places in 1997.
