= Francis-Gulick Mill =

Archaeological site in Virginia, United States

- Francis–Gulick Mill
- U.S. National Register of Historic Places
- Virginia Landmarks Register
- Location within Northern Virginia Location within Virginia Location within the United States
- Nearest city: Leesburg, Virginia
- Coordinates: 39°1′39″N 77°33′27″W
- Area: less than one acre
- NRHP reference No.: 05001582
- VLR No.: 053-0365

Significant dates
- Added to NRHP: February 1, 2006
- Designated VLR: December 7, 2005

Francis–Gulick Mill is a historic archaeological site located near Leesburg, Loudoun County, Virginia. The site includes a small stone miller's house foundation, stone remnants of a mill foundation, and the millrace and two millstones that are lying next to the miller's house foundations. The mill and miller's house may have been built as early as the late-18th century and were in use at least by the second decade of the 19th century. The mill appears to have been abandoned by 1879 and the house was abandoned in the 1880s.

It was listed on the National Register of Historic Places in 2006.
