= Rock Hill Farm (Bluemont, Virginia) =

Historic house in Virginia, United States

- U.S. National Register of Historic Places
- Virginia Landmarks Register
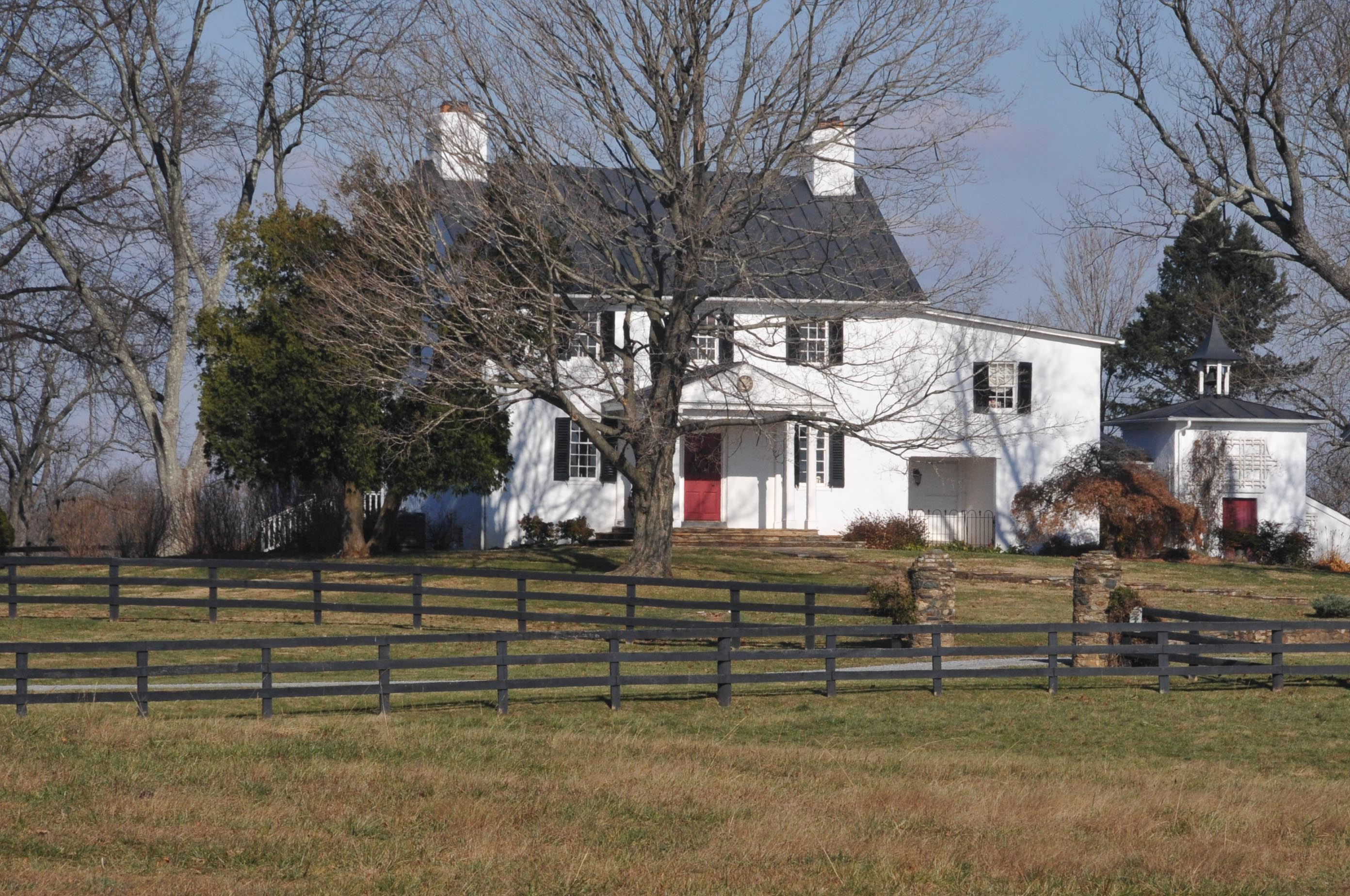

- Location within Northern Virginia Location within Virginia Location within the United States
- Location: 20775 Airmont Rd., Bluemont, Virginia
- Coordinates: 39°02′55″N 77°49′52″W
- Area: 68.8 acres (27.8 ha)
- Built: 1797
- Architectural style: Federal
- NRHP reference No.: 09000664
- VLR No.: 053-1057

Significant dates
- Added to NRHP: August 27, 2009
- Designated VLR: June 18, 2009

Rock Hill Farm is a historic home and farm located near Bluemont, Loudoun County, Virginia. The original section of the house was built about 1797, and has undergone at least four additions and renovations about 1873, 1902, 1947, and 1990. It is two-story, stuccoed stone, Quaker plan, Federal style dwelling with a gable roof. Also on the property are the contributing two-story, wood-frame bank barn (c. 1797); one-story, pyramidal-roofed, stucco-finished smokehouse (c. 1797); a two-story, gable-roofed, stucco and frame garage (c. 1797); one story, gable-roofed, wood-frame corncrib (c. 1873); one-story, gable-roofed, wood-frame office/dairy (c. 1873); a fieldstone run-in shed (c. 1873); a one-story, gable roofed, wood-frame stable (c. 1950); the remains of a formal boxwood garden (c. 1950); several ca. 19th-century, dry-laid, fieldstone fences (contributing); and a cemetery (c. 1820).

It was listed on the National Register of Historic Places in 2009.
