= Edward Nichols House =

Historic house in Virginia, United States

- U.S. National Register of Historic Places
- Virginia Landmarks Register
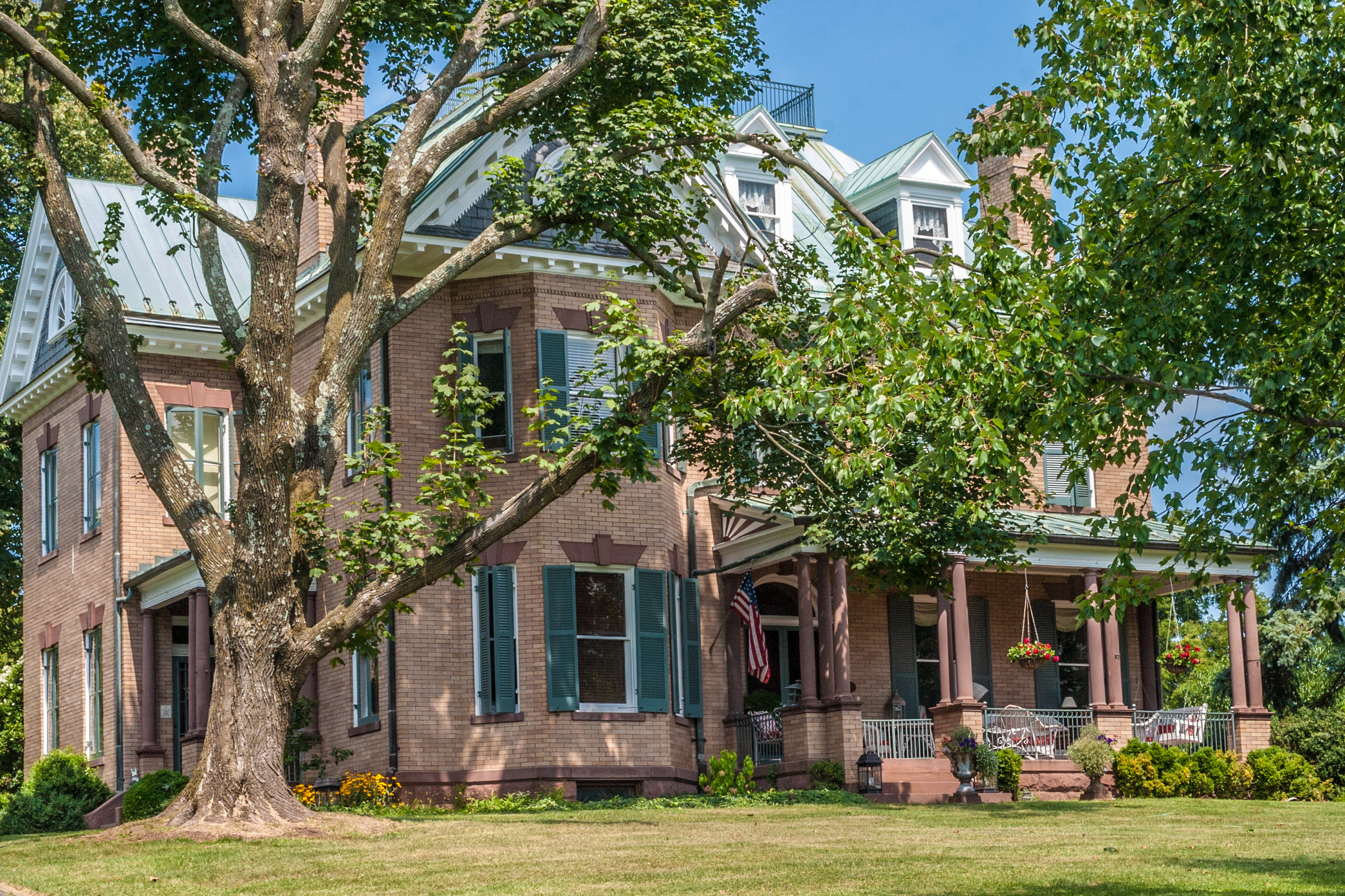
- Edward Nichols House, 2013

- Location within Northern Virginia Location within Virginia Location within the United States
- Location: 330 W. Market St., Leesburg, Virginia
- Coordinates: 39°7′5″N 77°34′24″W
- Area: 2.4 acres (0.97 ha)
- Built: 1899
- Architect: Norris, Lemuel
- Architectural style: Colonial Revival, Queen Anne
- NRHP reference No.: 87002117
- VLR No.: 253-0063

Significant dates
- Added to NRHP: December 4, 1987
- Designated VLR: October 20, 1987

Edward Nichols House, also known as Hillcrest, is a historic home located at Leesburg, Loudoun County, Virginia. It was built in 1899, and is a 2 1/2-story, irregularly shaped, beige brick dwelling with Queen Anne and Colonial Revival style decorative details. It has a tall hipped roof, two-story rear ell, and features projecting two-story bay windows topped with gables on the front and east elevations. Also on the property are the contributing laundry, carriage house / barn with attached water tower, and storage shed.

It was listed on the National Register of Historic Places in 1987.
