= Woodburn (Leesburg, Virginia) =

Historic house in Virginia, United States

- U.S. National Register of Historic Places
- Virginia Landmarks Register
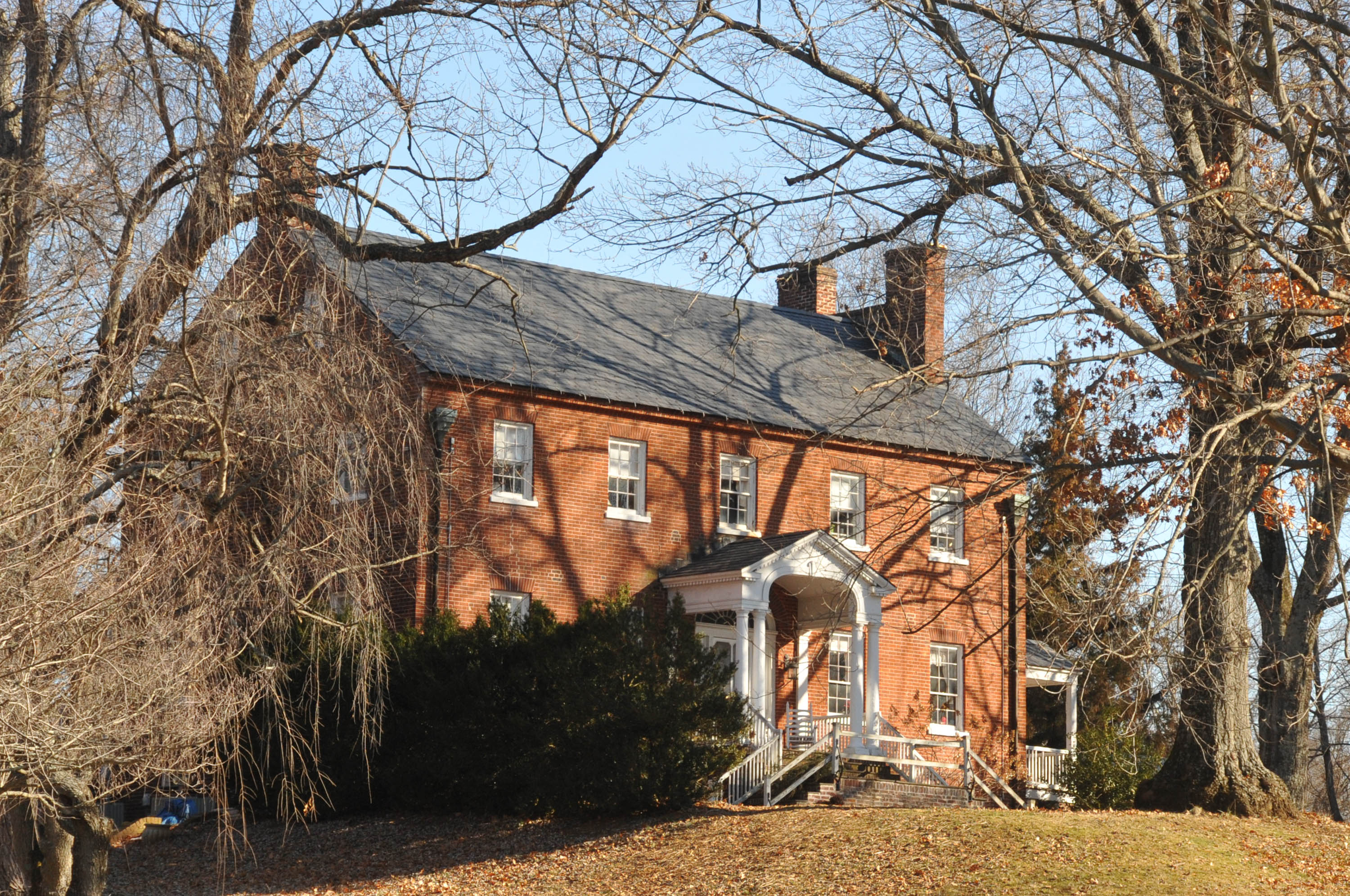

- Location within Northern Virginia Location within Virginia Location within the United States
- Location: 3 miles (4.8 km) southwest of Leesburg off VA 704, near Leesburg, Virginia
- Coordinates: 39°05′21.63″N 77°37′10.51″W
- Area: 240 acres (97 ha)
- Built: 1777
- NRHP reference No.: 76002111
- VLR No.: 053-0105

Significant dates
- Added to NRHP: December 12, 1976
- Designated VLR: September 21, 1976; March 10, 2008

Woodburn is a farm complex that was built beginning about 1777 for the Nixson family near Leesburg, Virginia. The first structure on the property was a stone gristmill, built by George Nixson, followed by a stone miller's residence in 1787, along with a stable. The large brick house was built between 1825 and 1850 by George Nixson's son or grandson George. The house became known as "Dr. Nixson's Folly." A large brick bank barn dates from this time, when Woodburn had become a plantation.

The brick house is two stories with five bays, backed by a two-story seven-bay ell to the rear. The brickwork is in Flemish bond on the front and west sides, and four or five course American bond on the other sides. The house has a double-pile (two rooms deep) plan, but with a single full-depth parlor on the west side of the central hall. A "little parlor" lies on the other side of the hall. The bank barn features an overhanging forebay supported by six brick arches. A small forebay barn on a stone foundation is nearby. Down the hill from the main house lies the "patent house," whose original single-pen log structure was probably the first building on the site, erected to establish the land patent. It has since been extended twice.

An additional structure, the farm manager's house, was added to the National Register of Historic Places listing in 2008. The frame house was built in 1909 on a fieldstone foundation. The house has five rooms on each level with a large stair hall on both levels. A rear staircase connects the rearmost rooms.

The Woodburn property was listed on the National Register of Historic Places on December 12, 1976, with the farm manager's house added in 2008.
