= Welbourne (Middleburg, Virginia) =

Historic house in Virginia, United States

- U.S. National Register of Historic Places
- Virginia Landmarks Register
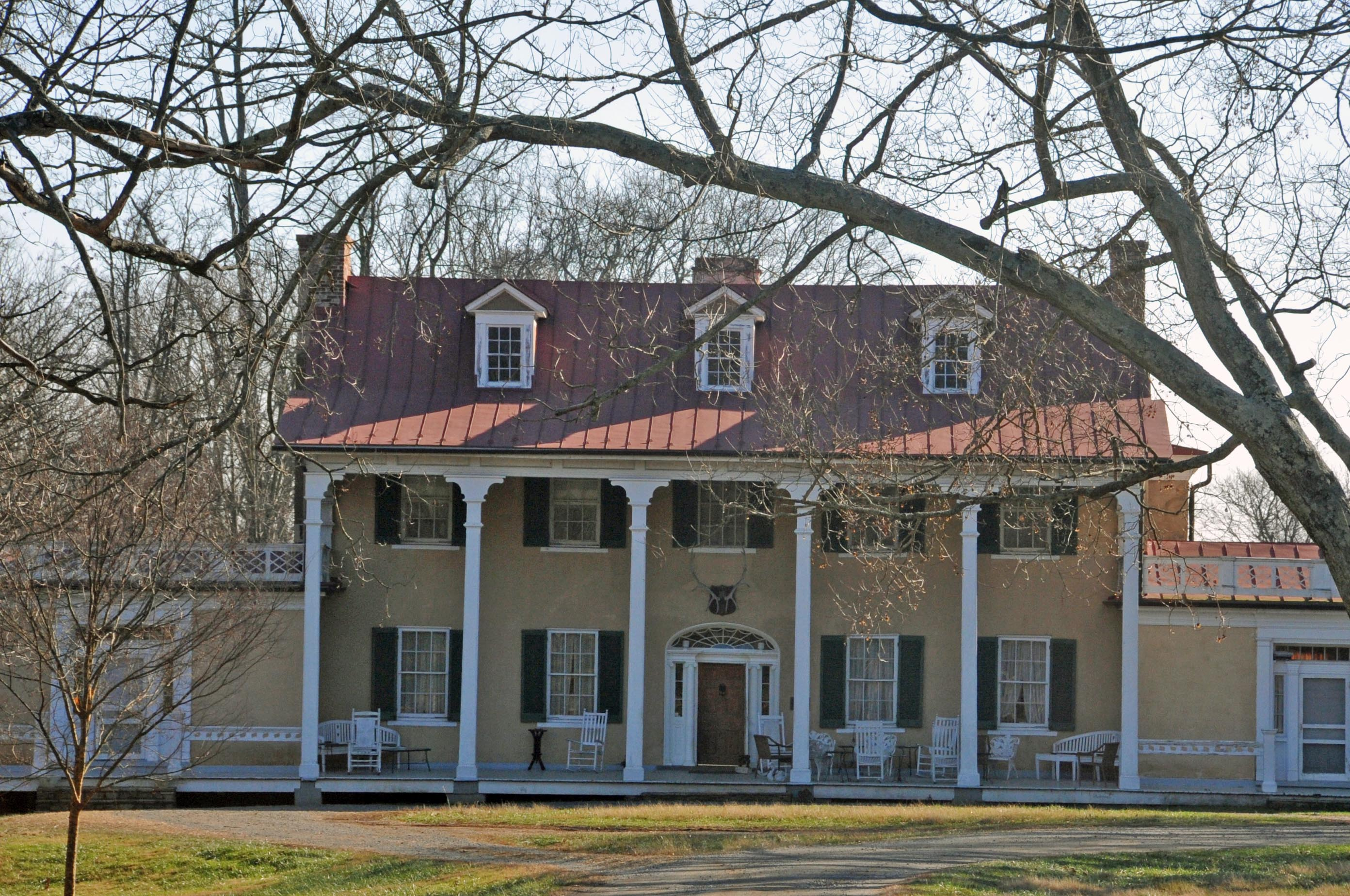

- Location within Northern Virginia Location within Virginia Location within the United States
- Location: Northwest of the junction of VA 743 and 6111, Middleburg, Virginia
- Coordinates: 39°00′04″N 77°48′44.1″W
- Area: 520 acres (210 ha)
- Built: 1770
- NRHP reference No.: 72001404
- VLR No.: 053-0120

Significant dates
- Added to NRHP: February 23, 1972
- Designated VLR: July 6, 1971

Welbourne is the main house of what was formerly a large plantation in Loudoun County, Virginia. The original core of the house, in what is now the south wing, was built about 1770. The stone house was two and a half stories tall, with three bays, one room deep. Some of the original woodwork survives in this section of the house. The house was expanded greatly by John Peyton Dulany around 1830, adding five bays in stuccoed brick, connected to the original house by a transverse hall. The interior of the new section features Greek Revival detailing. A two-story portico with Italianate columns was added in the 1850s, and the house was further enlarged with a two-story addition on the south side in the 1870s. The whole is covered with stucco, detailed with faux-painted joints.

The house faces an axial lane through a park-like setting. The house's surroundings include a designed garden to the east with one of the oldest swimming pools in Virginia. The property includes a number of outbuildings, including a tenant house, spring house, servants' house, toolhouse, smokehouse and a schoolhouse, as well as a subsidiary dwelling reputed to be older than the main house.

The house has remained in the hands of Dulany descendants. It was listed on the National Register of Historic Places on February 23, 1972, and is operated as a bed-and-breakfast inn.
