= Battle of Unison =

Battle of the American Civil War

Coordinates: 39°2′19.77″N 77°47′35.54″W

- Part of the American Civil War
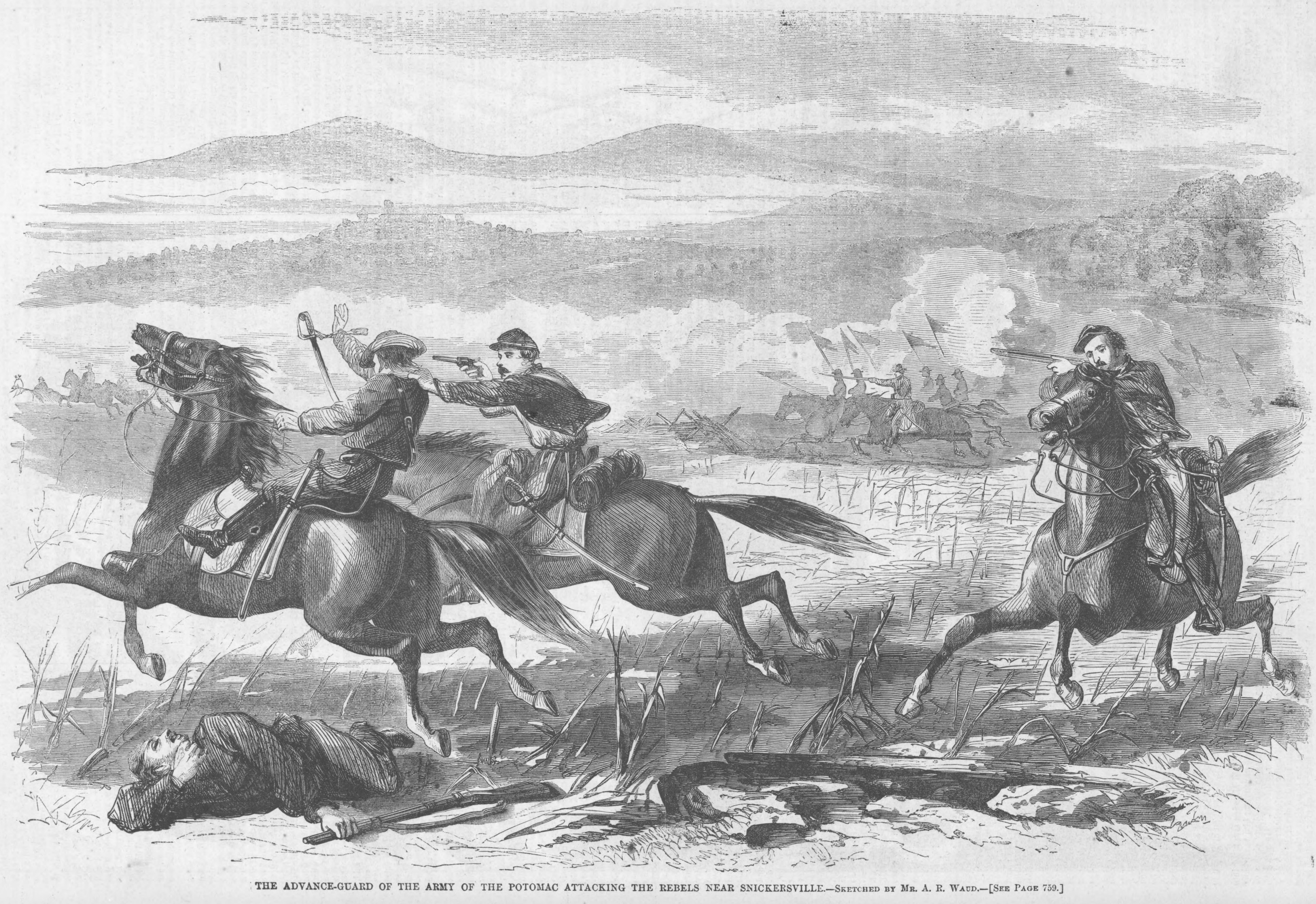
- The advance-guard of the Army of the Potomac attacking the rebels near Snickersville, November 1862 (illustration by A. R. Waud in Harper's Weekly)
Date	November 1 – 3, 1862
Location	Loudoun County, Virginia
Result	Inconclusive

Belligerents
United States (Union)	(Confederate States of America) CSA (Confederacy)

Commanders and leaders
Alfred Pleasanton	J.E.B. Stuart

Strength
Divisions	Brigade

Casualties and losses
?	?

Battle of Unison, near Philomont, Va.

The Battle of Unison or Battle of Union was a series of American Civil War cavalry skirmishes in Loudoun County, Virginia, between November 1 and 3, 1862, between the Confederate forces of J.E.B. Stuart and various units of the Union Army of the Potomac. Although driven from the field in individual engagements, Stuart accomplished his mission to delay the enemy and screen the movements of the retreating Army of Northern Virginia.

== Background ==
Following the Battle of Antietam, Robert E. Lee and his Army of Northern Virginia withdrew back into Virginia through the Shenandoah Valley. On October 10, 1862, J.E.B. Stuart and his cavalry set out from Williamsport to ride around the Federal army for the second time in the war in his Chambersburg Raid. On October 12, 1862, Stuart completed his ride and reentered Virginia via White's Ford in Loudoun County, bringing along nearly 1,200 captured horses. Stuart quickly passed through the county and crossed over Snickers Gap into the Shenandoah Valley to rejoin Lee's army.

On October 27, George B. McClellan and his Army of the Potomac reentered Virginia in pursuit of Lee, crossing the Potomac River around Berlin (present day Brunswick, Maryland) and Harpers Ferry. The Union army proceeded down the Loudoun Valley, foraging off local farms. On October 30, Stuart, with Brigadier General Fitzhugh Lee's brigade and Major John Pelham's artillery, reentered Loudoun County to reconnoiter the enemy's position and screen the movement of the Army of Northern Virginia as it repositioned itself south of the Rappahannock River. After crossing the Blue Ridge into Loudoun County, they bivouacked in Bloomfield for the night.

== The skirmishes ==
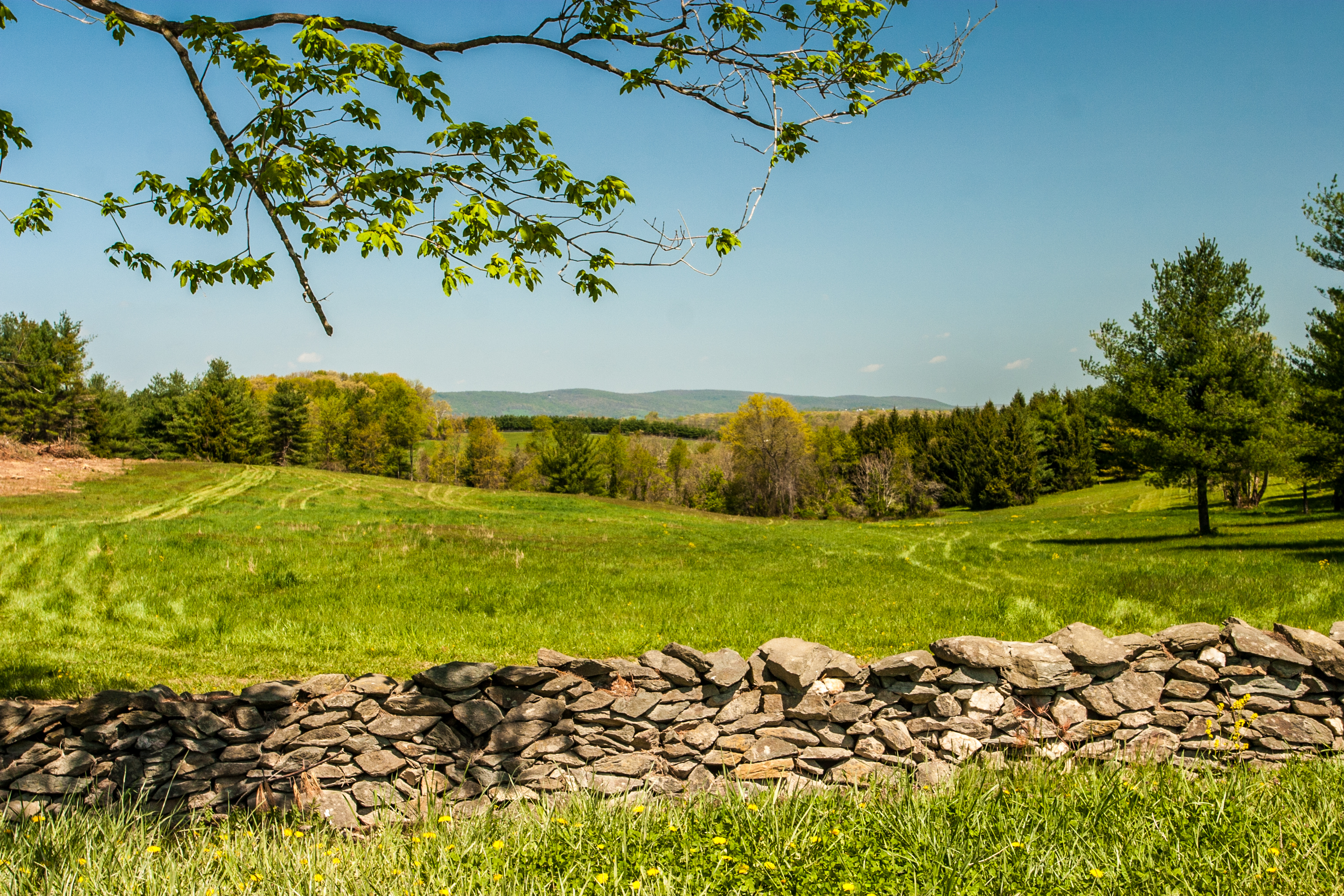
The site of the battle in 2013

On October 28, Stuart's men rode down the Snicker's Gap Turnpike towards Mountville, where Federals were reportedly camped. Upon entering the village, the Confederates found a force of about 100 or so Federals. Stuart was able to surprise and rout them, killing or capturing almost the entire force. Those who escaped galloped down the turnpike towards Aldie with the Confederates in hot pursuit. The chase stopped at Aldie, where Stuart's cavalrymen encountered a large contingent of Federals defending the village. Union artillery placed on the heights west of town drove Stuart's force back up the turnpike.

Stuart refused to give up the fight, however, and soon brought up Pelham's artillery. It outdueled its Union counterpart, eventually driving it and the rest of the Federals from Aldie. During the artillery duel, Stuart received an erroneous report that Federals were approaching the Confederates' rear from Mountville, and thus he neglected to give chase. Instead, he turned his force to meet this phantom threat in his rear. Upon realizing the error, Stuart and his forces retired to Bloomfield, leaving pickets east and west of his position along the turnpike.

The following morning, Stuart's eastern pickets at Philomont were attacked by approaching Federals. In response, he moved his force east to Unison at the intersection of the turnpike and the major north-south road through the area, thus placing himself between the Federals and D.H. Hill's forces encamped at Upperville. The Federals, however, did not press the attack for the rest of the day.

The next morning at 8 a.m., they attacked Stuart's position with infantry, cavalry, and artillery. Stuart skillfully dismounted his command and had them take cover behind numerous stone walls in Unison, while placing Pelham's artillery on the heights west of town. In these positions, he was able to hold out against a far superior Federal force for most of the day. Finally, as night fell, the Federals made a concerted push, and Stuart was forced to make a hasty retreat to Upperville, leaving his seriously wounded behind. Once safely at Upperville, Stuart planned a renewed attack on the Federals for the next day, but scouts soon reported that the entire Federal Army was bearing down on him. Stuart decided to cross the Blue Ridge at Ashby's Gap the following morning to meet up with Stonewall Jackson and screen his movements in the Shenandoah Valley.

== Results ==
The Federals were able to force Stuart to leave his wounded behind when his force was driven from Loudoun County, but it took the weight of nearly the entire army to do so and the Federals still were unable to prevent Stuart from killing and capturing more men and seizing more horses. Furthermore, Stuart was able to drive a portion of the Federal army before him. Ultimately, Stuart succeeded in slowing down and harassing the already slow and beleaguered Federals, contributing to the War Department's decision to remove General McClellan from his command.

Stuart's actions helped give the Confederate army more time to reposition and regather itself for a renewed Union campaign in Virginia. Riding with Stuart during the fighting around Unison was a young scout and staff officer who was seeing the Loudoun Valley for the first time. This scout, John S. Mosby, would become widely celebrated in that region for his daring exploits as a partisan ranger.

== Historic district ==
- Unison Battlefield Historic District
- U.S. National Register of Historic Places
- Location within Virginia
- Location: Parts of Quaker Ln., Jeb Stuart, Unison, Newlin Mill, Millville, Bloomfield, Welbourne, Greengarden Rds., Unison, Virginia
- Area: 8,000 acres (3,200 ha)
- Built: 1862
- NRHP reference No.: 11000835
- Added to NRHP: November 22, 2011

The Unison Battlefield Historic District, spanning Loudoun and Fauquier Counties in Virginia, was listed on the National Register of Historic Places in November 2011.

== See also ==
- National Register of Historic Places listings in Loudoun County, Virginia
- National Register of Historic Places listings in Fauquier County, Virginia
