= Bluemont Historic District =

Historic district in Virginia, United States

- U.S. National Register of Historic Places
- U.S. Historic district
- Virginia Landmarks Register
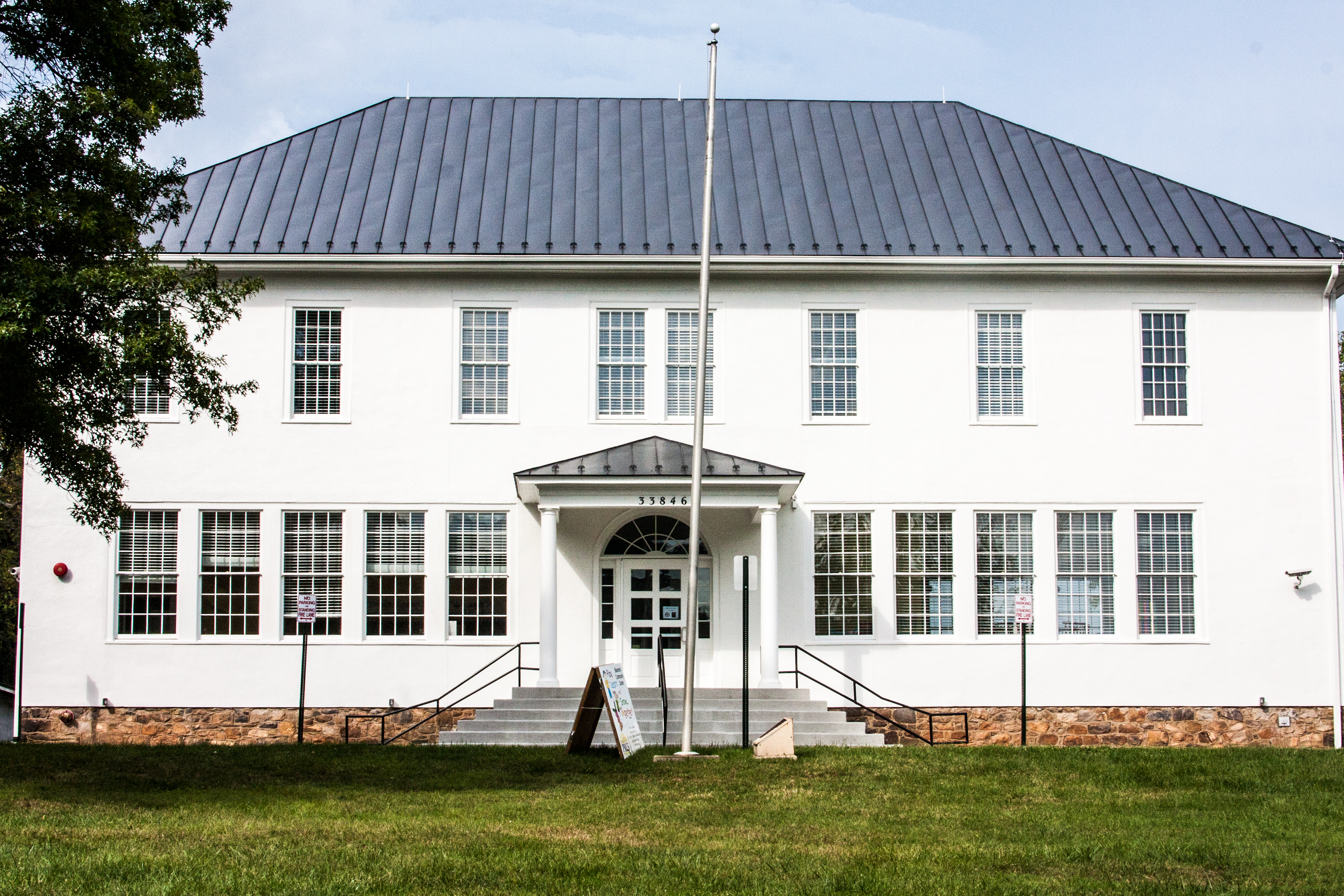
- Bluemont Community Center

- Location within Northern Virginia Location within Virginia Location within the United States
- Location: VA 734 and 760, Bluemont, Virginia
- Coordinates: 39°6′38.35″N 77°49′59.50″W
- Area: 60 acres (24 ha)
- NRHP reference No.: 84003546
- VLR No.: 053-6161

Significant dates
- Added to NRHP: February 23, 1984
- Designated VLR: January 17, 1984

The Bluemont Historic District comprises the historic core of Bluemont, Virginia. The town is located on the eastern side of Snickers Gap, with the majority of the district fronting on the Snickersville Turnpike, also designated Virginia State Route 734. The district includes 43 buildings, of which 36 are houses, five are commercial structure, a church and a community center. The oldest structure in Bluemont is Clayton Hall (1797), a large stone house. The Amos Clayton farm was located at the junction of Routes 734 and 760, now in the center of town. Relatively few pre-Civil War structures remain in Bluemont. Apart from Clayton Hall, the most significant is the Bluemont Methodist Church (circa 1851).

== Background ==
Most of the district's houses date from the late 19th and early 20th centuries. The completion of the Washington and Old Dominion Railroad line in 1900 to Bluemont brought prosperity and growth to the town. Two hotels, the Loudoun House Hotel (1900) and the Blue Ridge Inn (1904), served summer visitors to the mountaintop town.

The Bluemont Historic District was listed on the National Register of Historic Places on February 23, 1984.
