= Mountville, Virginia =

Unincorporated community in Virginia, United States

- Unincorporated community
- Location within Northern Virginia Location within Virginia Location within the United States
- Coordinates: 39°01′31″N 77°42′43″W
- Country: United States
- State: Virginia
- County: Loudoun
- Time zone: UTC−5 (Eastern (EST))
  - Summer (DST): UTC−4 (EDT)

Mountville is an unincorporated community in the Loudoun Valley of Loudoun County, Virginia, United States. The village is situated on Snickersville Turnpike halfway between Aldie and Philomont at the intersection of Mountville Road.

Mountville is located on a promontory between the main branch of the Goose Creek and its tributary, Beaverdam Creek, at the western base of Catoctin Mountain.

Despite its geographic location, Mountville is named not for its elevation but rather for Ezekiel Mount, who first settled the area in 1797, after moving to Loudoun from Mountville, Pennsylvania. The village was officially christened Mountville in 1817 with the establishment of a post office in the village bearing that name.

Mountville was the scene of early skirmishing during the American Civil War's Battle of Unison.
