= Purcellville Gazette =

- Type: Weekly newspaper
- Format: Tabloid
- Owner(s): Pregartner Publications & Communications
- Founder: R. Ben Weber
- Publisher: Kim Pregartner
- Founded: 2004
- Ceased publication: 2020
- Political alignment: none
- Language: English
- Headquarters: Purcellville, VA
- ISSN: 1549-9308

The Purcellville Gazette was a weekly tabloid-style newspaper serving Western Loudoun County, Virginia encompassing Purcellville, Hamilton, Hillsboro, Round Hill, Bluemont, Waterford, Middleburg, Lincoln, Philomont, Paeonian Springs, and Leesburg. The Gazette was founded and published by Ben Weber in May 2004. The paper's main focus was community activities, the arts, educational and social pursuits, and sport. It was fully supported by advertisers and distributed without charge. Circulation grew to over 45k readers weekly and the paper received numerous awards for journalism and design.

This was the third paper in Weber's publishing company called Master Media Group. Along with the Purcellville Gazette was the Herndon Compass in Herndon, VA and the Old Town Compass in Winchester, VA. In 2014, Ben Weber sold the Gazette to Kim Pregartner for an undisclosed sum. The Herndon Compass was shut down once the then Town Council was unelected and the Old Town Compass was closed due to the printing cost increases. During this same time period, Weber was appointed to the Winchester City Council where he went on to win in the general election the following year.
