= Battle of Cool Spring =

Battle of the American Civil War

- Part of the American Civil War
Date	July 17–18, 1864
Location	Clarke County, Virginia 39.15°N 77.86°W
Result	Confederate victory

Belligerents
United States (Union)	(Confederate States of America) CSA (Confederacy)

Commanders and leaders
Horatio G. Wright; Joseph Thoburn	Jubal A. Early; John C. Breckinridge; John Brown Gordon

Strength
5,000	8,000

Casualties and losses
422	397
- Location of the battle in Virginia

The Battle of Cool Spring, also known as Castleman's Ferry, Island Ford, Parker's Ford, and Snicker's Ferry, was a battle in the American Civil War fought July 17–18, 1864, in Clarke County, Virginia, as part of the Valley Campaigns of 1864. The battle was a Confederate victory.

== Background ==
After the Battle of Fort Stevens on July 11, a Union column, consisting of the VI Corps and elements of the XIX Corps under Maj. Gen. Horatio Wright, pursued Lt. Gen. Jubal Early's Army of the Valley northwestward as it withdrew from the environs of Washington, D.C., through Loudoun County, Virginia. On July 15, Wright's force was joined by elements of Brig. Gen. George Crook's command, which had accompanied Maj. Gen. David Hunter during his retreat through West Virginia following the Battle of Lynchburg on June 18.

After two brief engagements in Loudoun County at Heaton's Crossroads (present day Purcellville) and Woodgrove on July 16, Early's main force crossed west over the Blue Ridge Mountains at Snickers Gap and established themselves around Berryville. To cover his rear, Early left substantial rearguard forces at main river crossings of the Shenandoah River. On July 17, the Union cavalry passed westward through Snicker's Gap and unsuccessfully attempted to force passage of the river at Castleman's Ferry (Snicker's Ford).

The following day, Union Generals Crook and Wright arrived at Snicker's Gap and determined to attack what they mistakenly thought was a light picket line of Confederates along the river, left to cover Early's retreat up the Valley. Instead of allowing his cavalry to cross the river and reconnoiter the Confederate positions to confirm this assumption, he dispatched them to Ashby's Gap to attack Early's supply train, which was traveling to the south of Early's main army. Wright then developed a plan where a small Federal force would cross the river northward, downstream from the main crossing at Castleman's Ferry and flank the Confederate position. Gen. Crook assigned Col. Joseph Thoburn to this task.

== Battle ==
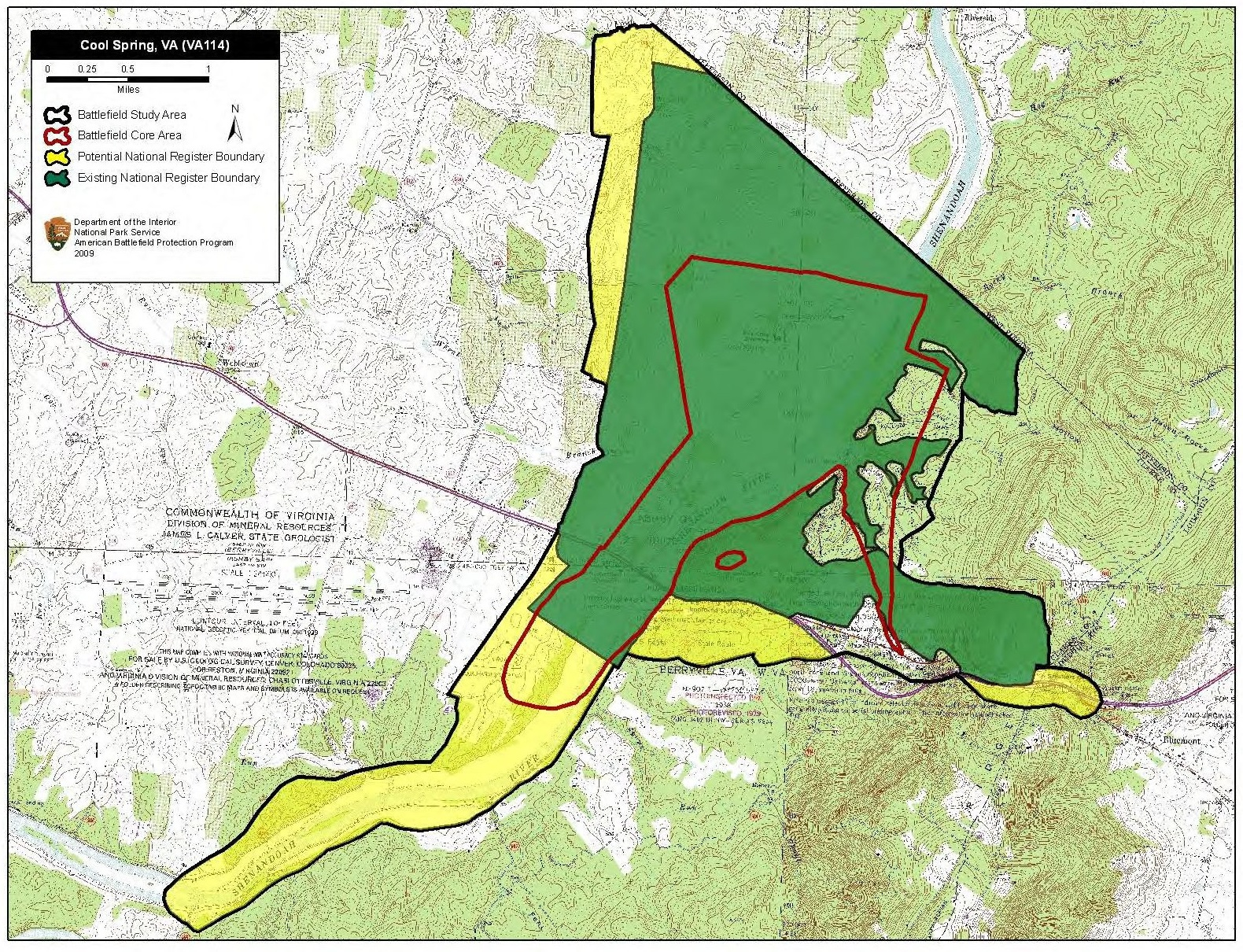
Map of Cool Spring Battlefield core and study areas by the American Battlefield Protection Program.

At 3 p.m., Thoburn crossed the Shenandoah below Castleman's Ferry, at Judge Richard Parker's Ford, quickly driving off a small force of Confederate pickets. The pickets quickly alerted their commanders, Maj. Gens. John B. Gordon and John C. Breckinridge, of the Federal advance. Gordon responded by moving a division to the vicinity of the ford, using a small ridge that lay between him and the Federals to screen his movements. Breckinridge ordered Brig. Gen. Gabriel C. Wharton and Maj. Gen. Robert E. Rodes to the ford; they deployed along Gordon's left flank, with Wharton forming the center. Wharton's sharpshooters quickly drove back Thoburn's skirmishers who occupied a valley between the ridge on which the Confederates were lined and the high ground along the riverbank where the first of two federal lines was formed in front of a stone fence. A reserve line was located on the low sunken bank of the river behind the stone fence, well protected and concealed from the Confederates.

Around 6 p.m., Rodes attacked the main Federal position on the high ground along its right flank. The Federal line turned to meet the attack and exposed its left flank to enfilading fire from Gordon and Wharton. The line collapsed and untrained, unmounted cavalrymen from Col. Samuel B.M. Young's Provisional Brigade began the retreat over the stone wall and across the Shenandoah. About the time of the Federal retreat, Brig. Gen. James B. Ricketts arrived on the eastern bank of the river. Originally intended to reinforce Thoburn, Gen. Wright demurred with Thoburn's line in full retreat. As Rodes's men pressed the attack they came to the stone wall, whereupon the Federal reserve line opened up on the unsuspecting Confederates, driving them back towards the ridge. Throughout the remainder of the evening, Rodes sent small brigade-level attacks at the Federal position on the riverbank, but was unsuccessful in driving them across the river, because Thoburn was able to reinforce his right due to the lack of pressure on his left by Gordon and Wharton. After sunset, Thoburn retired the rest of his force across the river.

== Aftermath ==
The battle was a Confederate victory. Wright had sent a small force against a well reinforced Confederate position without the aid of cavalry because he mistakenly assumed it was only the pickets of Early's rearguard. Thoburn's force paid dearly for the mistake. West Virginia militia Col. Daniel E. Frost, speaker of the House of Delegates of the Restored Government of Virginia, who had taken command of the embattled troops in Snicker's Gap, received what became a mortal abdominal wound. Still, Thoburn's judicious use of terrain and lack of coordination on the Confederate side allowed Thoburn to stave off a full routing of his troops and thus minimize his casualties. The following day both armies remained in the same positions as the night before and engaged in little fighting. Gen. Hunter, however, took the initiative and sent a force out from Harpers Ferry to pressure Early's position from the north, causing the Confederates to withdraw from Berryville the following day and setting in motion the Valley Campaigns of 1864.

== Battlefield preservation ==
The Cool Spring Battlefield was added to the National Register of Historic Places in 1997. The Civil War Trust (a division of the American Battlefield Trust) and its federal, state and local partners have helped save 1,226 acres (4.96 km^{2}) of the battlefield, preserved by easement agreements with Holy Cross Abbey and Shenandoah University. Since 2013, the university has helped protect the preserved land. One hundred ninety-five acres of the battlefield are known as the Shenandoah River Campus at Cool Spring Battlefield - an outdoor classroom for the university and the general public.

== Literature ==
Snicker's Gap, where Whittaker Chambers' grandfather escaped a Confederate bullet

In his 1952 memoir Witness, Whittaker Chambers relates an anecdote about his maternal grandfather, Charles Whittaker (1840–1899) of Milwaukee, Wisconsin, son of a Scottish immigrant. As a teenager, Whittaker had run away from home to join the Union Army. Due to his age, only a "convict regiment" stationed in Harper's Ferry would accept him. During the engagement at Snicker's Gap, Whittaker's regiment had to cross the enemy line under fire:

One man became so nervous that he jumped from behind my grandfather, whose body was protecting him, in front of my grandfather and was instantly shot dead. That was in my mind when I used to say sometimes to nervous friends during the Hiss Case, "Let's not jump out of line."
