= Richard Norris Brooke =

American genre and landscape painter

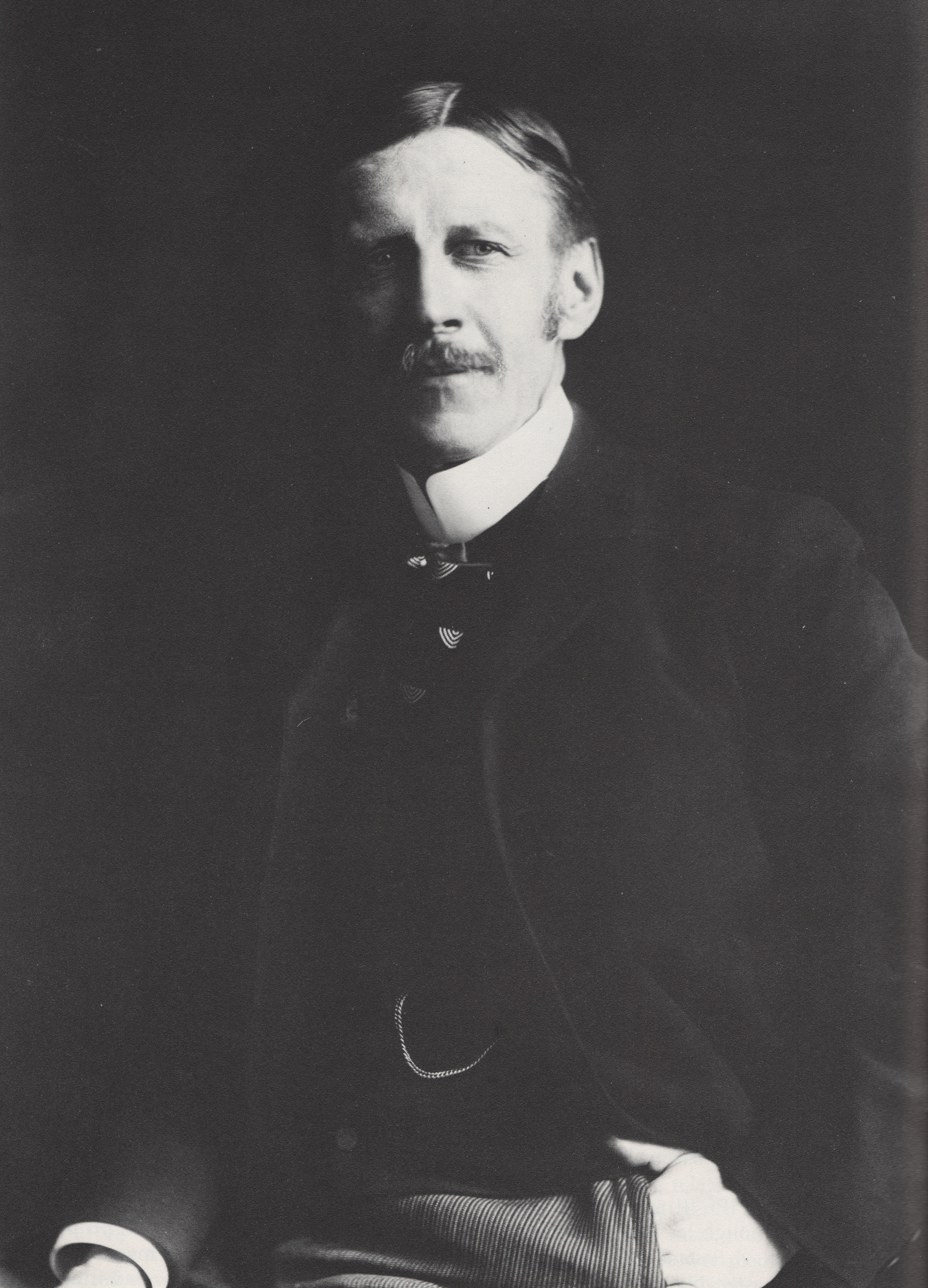
Portrait of Brooke by Frances Benjamin Johnston

Richard Norris Brooke (October 20, 1847 - April 25, 1920) was an American painter known especially for his genre scenes depicting African-American subjects. He has been described as "first among several artists who brought a national distinction to the Washington art community, and who were instrumental in making it more professional through the establishment of schools, clubs, and exhibitions."

== Life and career ==
Born in Warrenton, Virginia, Brooke was the son of James Vass Brooke and Mary Norris Brooke; he lived in Warrenton through the American Civil War, during which it was controlled by the Union Army. He is believed to have received his earliest instruction in art from William D. Washington, although definitive proof has never been found. The elder Brooke had made arrangements for his son to travel to Rome to study art under William Randolph Barbee, but the outbreak of war prevented the trip from taking place. Instead in 1865 Richard matriculated at the Pennsylvania Academy of the Fine Arts, at which he studied under Edmund Bonsell and James Lambdin, and from which he graduated in 1871. While living in Philadelphia he taught at a number of schools, including the Mount Vernon Institute; the Broad Street Military Academy, and Villa Nova College. At the death of William D. Washington in 1871, Brooke was appointed the chair of the Department of Fine Arts at the Virginia Military Institute, but he left the position the following year. In 1873 he became United States Consul at La Rochelle, in which role he remained until 1877; during his time in France he studied with Léon Bonnat, and later he would work with Carolus-Duran and Benjamin Constant.

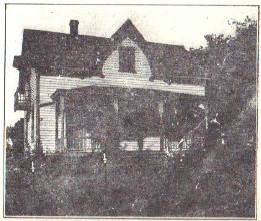
Brooke's studio building in Warrenton

Brooke settled in Washington, D.C. in 1880 and remained associated with the artistic life of that town until his death. He continued to travel to Europe, at various points visiting Paris, London, and The Hague. In Washington he moved into Vernon Row, a well-regarded studio building east of the White House, where he painted and displayed his art to the public. Later, with Max Weyl, he established a "Barbizon Studio" diagonally across from the former Corcoran Gallery on 17th St. and Pennsylvania Ave., but the commercial nature of the neighborhood meant that a true artistic community could not take hold in the area.

Brooke soon became active in the artistic affairs of his new city, becoming vice-president of the Washington Art Club in 1881 and remaining in that role until 1884. In the latter year he was among those who founded the Art Students League of Washington, at which he would also work as an instructor. Long on the staff of the Corcoran School, he serve as its vice principal from 1902 until 1917; his work was seen in the Corcoran Biennials of 1912, 1914, and 1916. He was also a member of the Washington Water Color Club, and showed work at that society's group exhibitions. In 1909, and again in 1913, he chaired the Medals and Badges Committee of the President's Inaugural Committee. In 1882 his work appeared in the annual show of the National Academy of Design; his paintings were also seen at William MacBeth's gallery. He was an exhibitor at the Cotton States and International Exposition, at which he won a medal, and at the National Conservation Exposition, at which his work appeared alongside that of numerous Washington colleagues. During his career he won a number of awards, including the Parsons Prize from the Society of Washington Artists in 1901 and the third Corcoran prize in 1904. In tandem with his work as a painter, in 1882 Brooke embarked on a second career as a purchaser of art for private collectors; Thomas E. Waggaman was his first client in this role.

Outside of his artistic pursuits, Brooke was known as a devout Christian who led mission meetings on Sundays at the Fauquier County Courthouse. He kept active in Warrenton affairs for much of his adult life; in 1882 he painted a flag to be presented to the Warrenton Rifles upon their journey to Yorktown to participate in the centennial celebration of the battle there, and on November 15, 1889, he was among those who saved William Washington's portrait of John Marshall from being destroyed in a fire that engulfed the courthouse. That same year he rented space in the Town Hall for use as an art gallery, and shortly thereafter erected a summer studio in town.

In his later years he passed his time between Washington and Warrenton, dying in the town of his birth at the home of his nephew. He is buried in the Warrenton Cemetery alongside his parents and younger sister. In his honor a memorial exhibit was mounted at the Corcoran in the year of his death. Leila Mechlin wrote in remembrance: "Had he settled in New York...he would probably have taken a leading part in the art world of the metropolis. But...he liked Washington, and here were his chosen comrades, Mr. Messer, Mr. Moser, Max Weyl, E. H. Miller....It will be hard to find a more delightful coterie...true artists all - congenial spirits."

Notable students of Brooke included Lillian Elvira Moore Abbot.

== Works ==
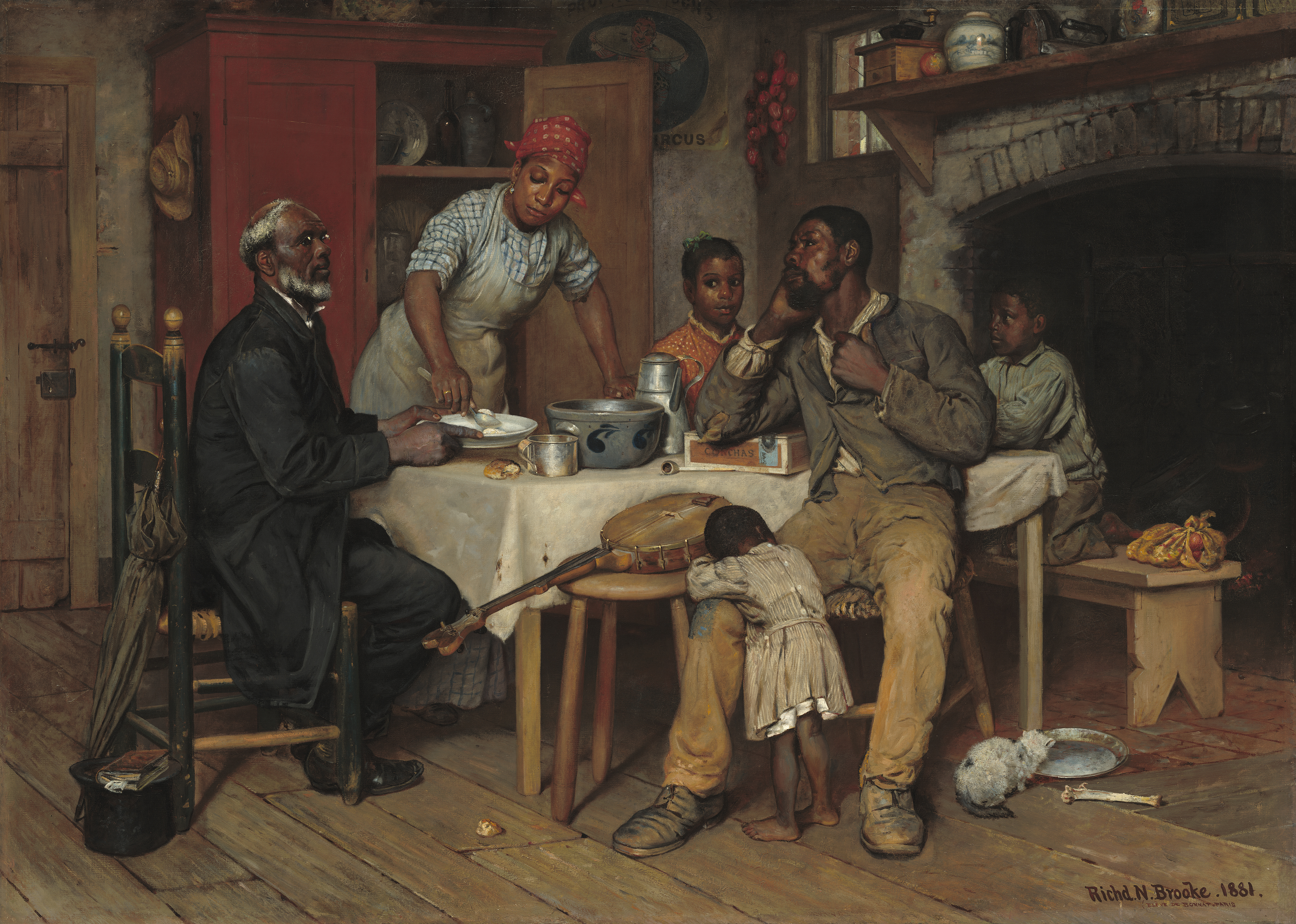
A Pastoral Visit, oil on canvas of 1881, in the collection of the National Gallery of Art

Brooke first achieved notice as a painter of genre scenes of African-American life; in 1871 and 1872, a number of such pieces were reproduced in Harper's Magazine, and his first major canvas upon returning from France, A Pastoral Visit, is representative of his work in the genre. Unusually among his contemporaries, he chose to depict his black subjects in a sympathetic, rather than a caricatured, light. He explained his motives in a letter offering the painting for sale to the Corcoran Gallery of Art:

It must have struck many of you that the fine range of subject afforded by Negro domestic life has been strangely abandoned to works of flimsy treatment and vulgar exaggeration. That peculiar humor which is characteristic of the race, and varies with the individual, cannot be thus crudely conveyed.

In entering this field, by the advice of many of my Artist friends, and with the equipment of a foreign training, I have had a deliberate purpose in view. It has been my aim while recognizing in proper measure the humorous features of my subject, to elevate it to that plane of sober and truthful treatment which, in French Art, has dignified the Peasant subjects of Jules Breton, and should characterize every work of Art. I am pleased to think, from the reception given by the public to this effort, that my object, however realized! has been felt and appreciated.

The Corcoran accepted the work for display, and for many years it remained a favorite in the museum's collection of American art.

Brooke produced numerous other genre pieces during his career, most notably A Dog Swap; he seems, however, to have preferred to paint landscapes instead of genre pieces, and spent much time depicting the landscape around Warrenton. With William Henry Holmes, Edmund Clarence Messer, James Henry Moser, and Max Weyl, among others, he formed a group, sometimes referred to as the "Washington Landscape School", whose paintings were inspired by the Barbizon school and by the then-contemporary work of Dutch painters. He also achieved a great deal of success as a portraitist. Over 200 of his paintings and drawings were lost when a fire swept Warrenton in 1909 and destroyed his summer studio, at which he had gathered many paintings in preparation for an upcoming exhibition.

== Collections ==
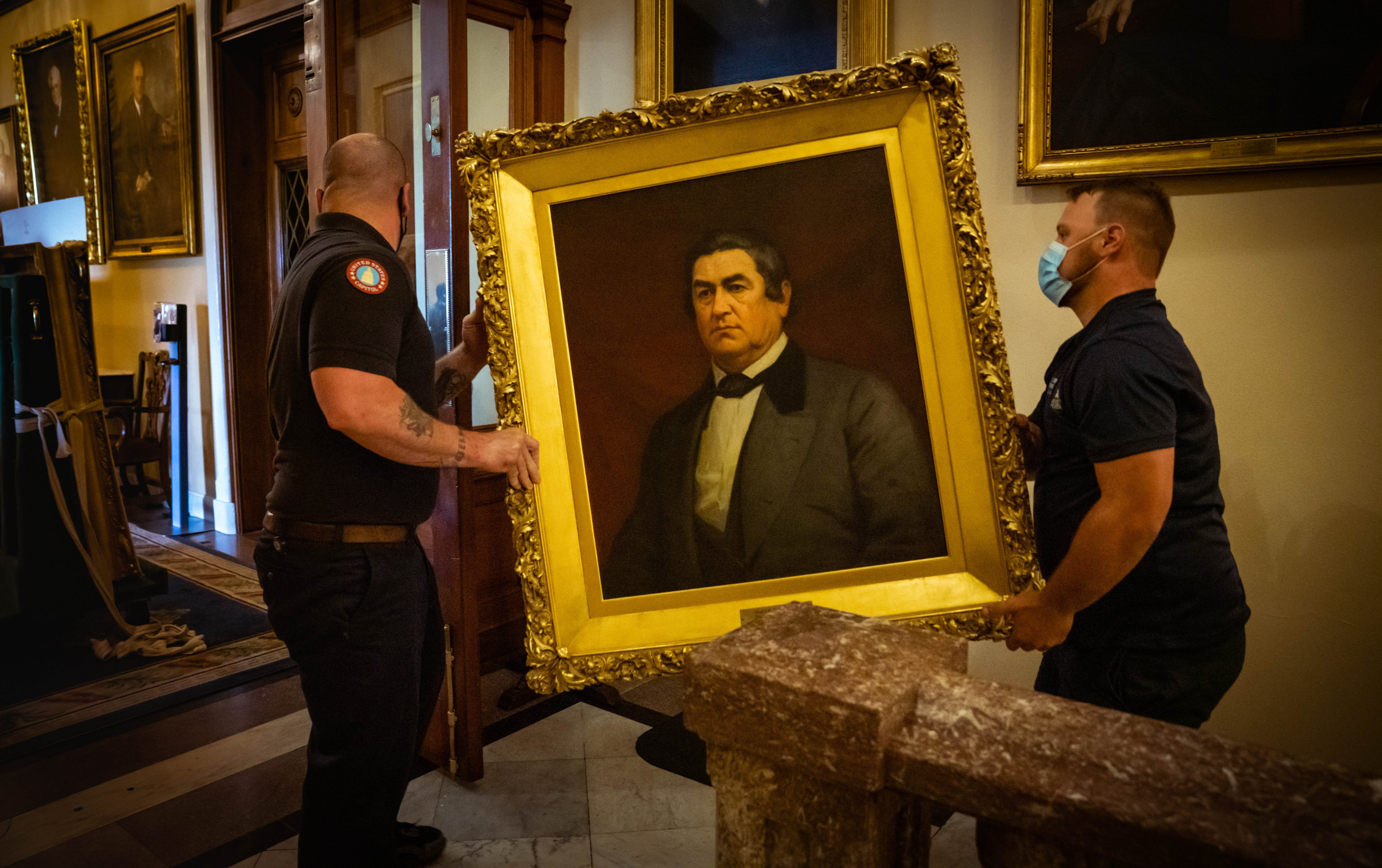
Brooke's portrait of Robert M. T. Hunter being removed from the Speakers Gallery of the U.S. Capitol, July 18, 2020.

The Pastoral Visit remained in the collection of the Corcoran Gallery of Art until that institution's dissolution, at which point it entered the collection of the National Gallery of Art. In the Smithsonian American Art Museum collection Brooke is represented by three works: A Dog Swap of 1881 and two undated works on paper, Burial of a Papoose and Yellowstone Geyser. Two paintings are owned by the Virginia Museum of Fine Arts, a depiction of Pocahontas completed in 1907, and a View of Gloucester Harbor dated to around 1910. Two portraits by Brooke are held by the United States House of Representatives. One, of John Marshall, is a copy of the Washington portrait which Brooke had saved from the fire at the Fauquier County Courthouse. The other, of Speaker Robert M. T. Hunter (later President pro tempore of the Confederate States Senate), was among the Confederate portraits ordered removed from display by Nancy Pelosi in 2020, in response to protests over the murder of George Floyd. A Civil War genre painting of 1872, Furling the Flag, is in the collection of the West Point Museum.

== Selected works ==
- Confederate Soldiers Furling Their Battle Flag for the Last Time (1872), U.S. Military Academy, West Point, New York
- A Dog Swap (1881), Smithsonian American Art Museum, Washington, D.C.
- A Pastoral Visit (oil on canvas, 1881), National Gallery of Art, Washington, D.C. Ex collection: Corcoran Gallery of Art
- Pocahontas (c.1889-1907), Virginia Museum of Fine Arts, Richmond, Virginia
- Elizabeth Lee Pollack (c.1890), Lloyd House, Alexandria, Virginia
- Benjamin H. Bristow (by 1893), U.S. Treasury Department, Washington, D.C. Served as Secretary of the Treasury, 1874-1876
- William J. Duane (by 1893), U.S. Treasury Department, Washington, D.C. Served as Secretary of the Treasury, 1833
- James Madison (1895), Union League Club of Chicago, Chicago, Illinois
  - A copy of this is in the collection of the U.S. House of Representatives.
- Rocky Coast (c.1900), Morris Museum of Art, Augusta, Georgia
- James Addison Quarles (1905), Washington and Lee University, Lexington, Virginia
- View of Gloucester Harbor (c. 1910), Virginia Museum of Fine Arts, Richmond, Virginia
- Robert M. T. Hunter (1911), U.S. House of Representatives Collection, U.S. Capitol, Washington D.C. Hunter was U.S. Speaker of the House, 1839-1841; and President pro tempore of the Confederate States Senate, 1862-1865. The portrait was removed from display in 2020.
- Woodrow Wilson (by 1917), Philipse Manor Hall, Yonkers, New York
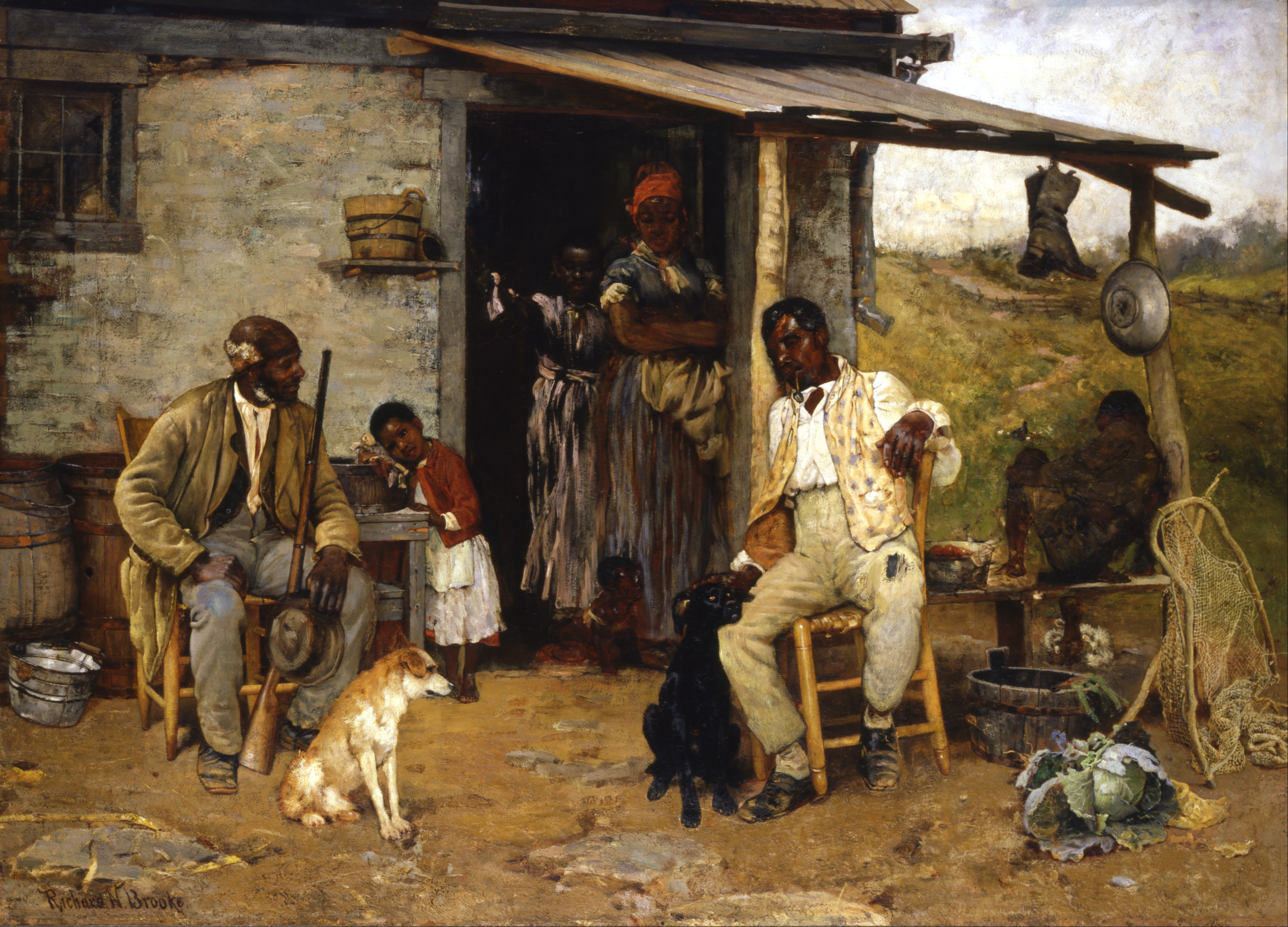
A Dog Swap (1881), Smithsonian American Art Museum

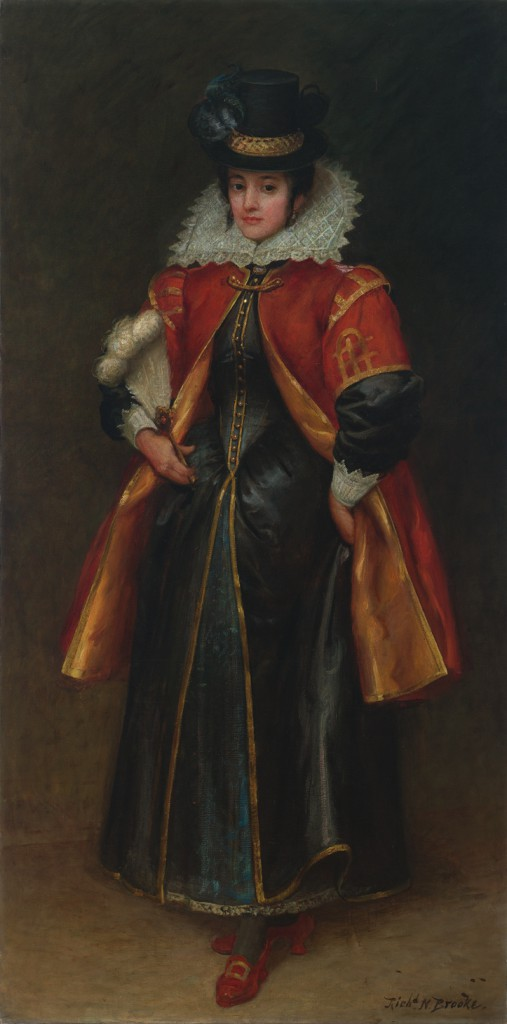
Pocahontas (c.1889-1907), Virginia Museum of Fine Arts

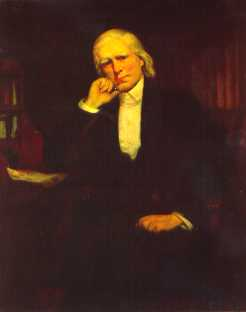
William J. Duane (by 1893), U.S. Treasury Department, Washington, D.C.
