= Bear's Den Rural Historic District =

Historic district in Virginia, United States

- U.S. National Register of Historic Places
- U.S. Historic district
- Virginia Landmarks Register
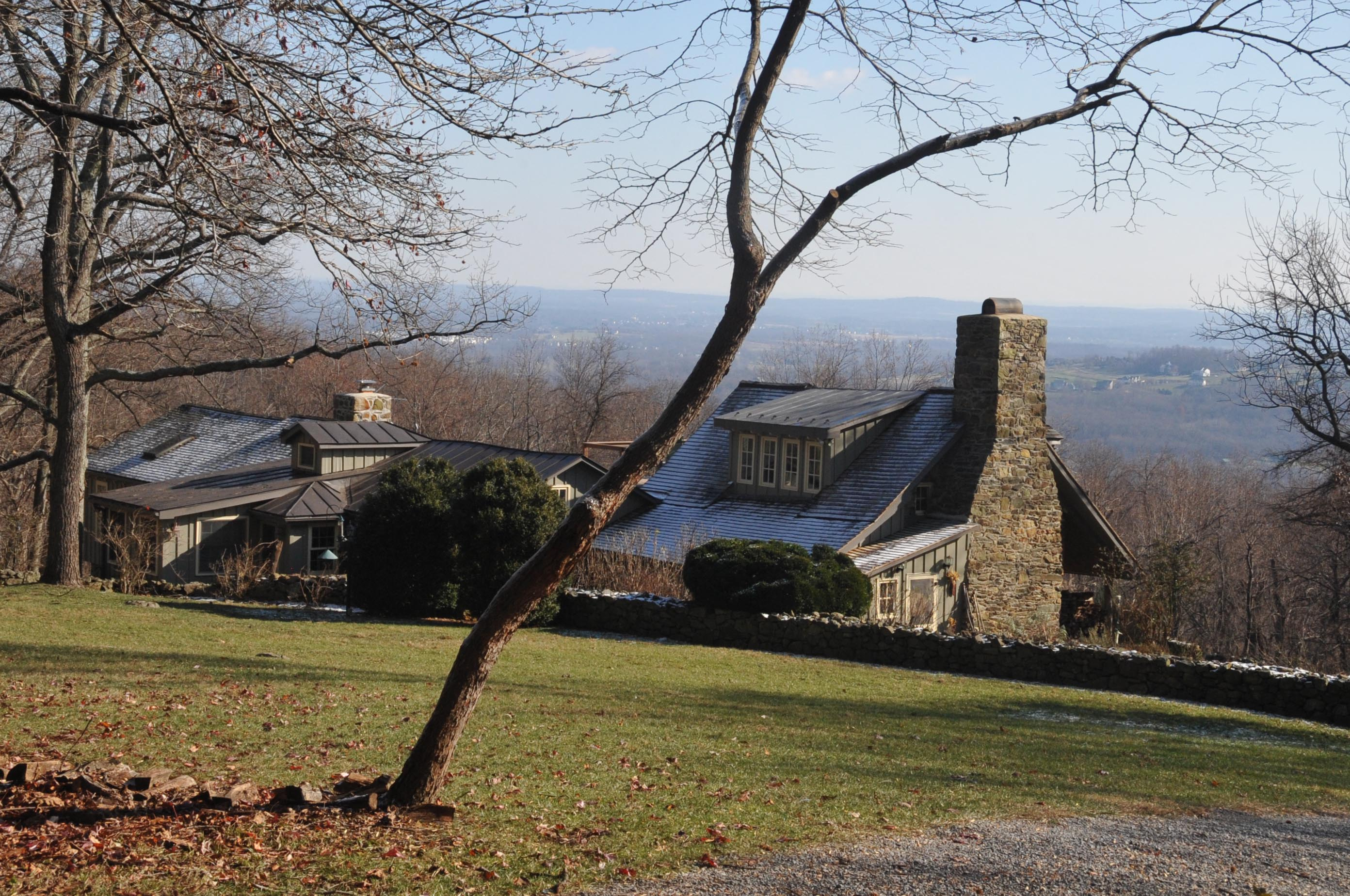
- Greenspring Cabin

- Location within Northern Virginia Location within Virginia Location within the United States
- Location: Generally runs along both side of ridge along parts of Raven Rocks and Blue Ridge Mtn. Rds., Bluemont, Virginia
- Coordinates: 39°6′35″N 77°50′56″W
- Area: 1,855 acres (751 ha)
- Built: 1890
- Architect: Hummer, William E.; Clarke, Appleton
- Architectural style: Queen Anne, Bungalow/craftsman
- NRHP reference No.: 08001112
- VLR No.: 021-5010

Significant dates
- Added to NRHP: May 14, 2009
- Designated VLR: September 18, 2008

Bear's Den Rural Historic District is a national historic district located at Bluemont, Clarke County and Loudoun County, Virginia. It encompasses 152 contributing buildings, 12 contributing sites, 8 contributing structures, and 1 contributing object. The district includes a collection of late-19th- and early-20th-century dwellings that were constructed primarily as summer homes by wealthy Washingtonians who were attracted by the mountain's cooler summer climate. Their architecture reflects a number of popular styles, primarily American Craftsman / Bungalow, Colonial Revival, and Queen Anne styles. Other contributing buildings include: farm outbuildings such as barns and stables; domestic outbuildings such as spring houses, meat houses, guest cottages, root cellars, and garages; a former school; and a former church. The contributing sites include the ruins of buildings; including picnic shelters, above-ground cisterns, an old road bed; and the contributing object is a county boundary marker.

It was listed on the National Register of Historic Places in 1996.
