= Lillian Elvira Moore Abbot =

American artist

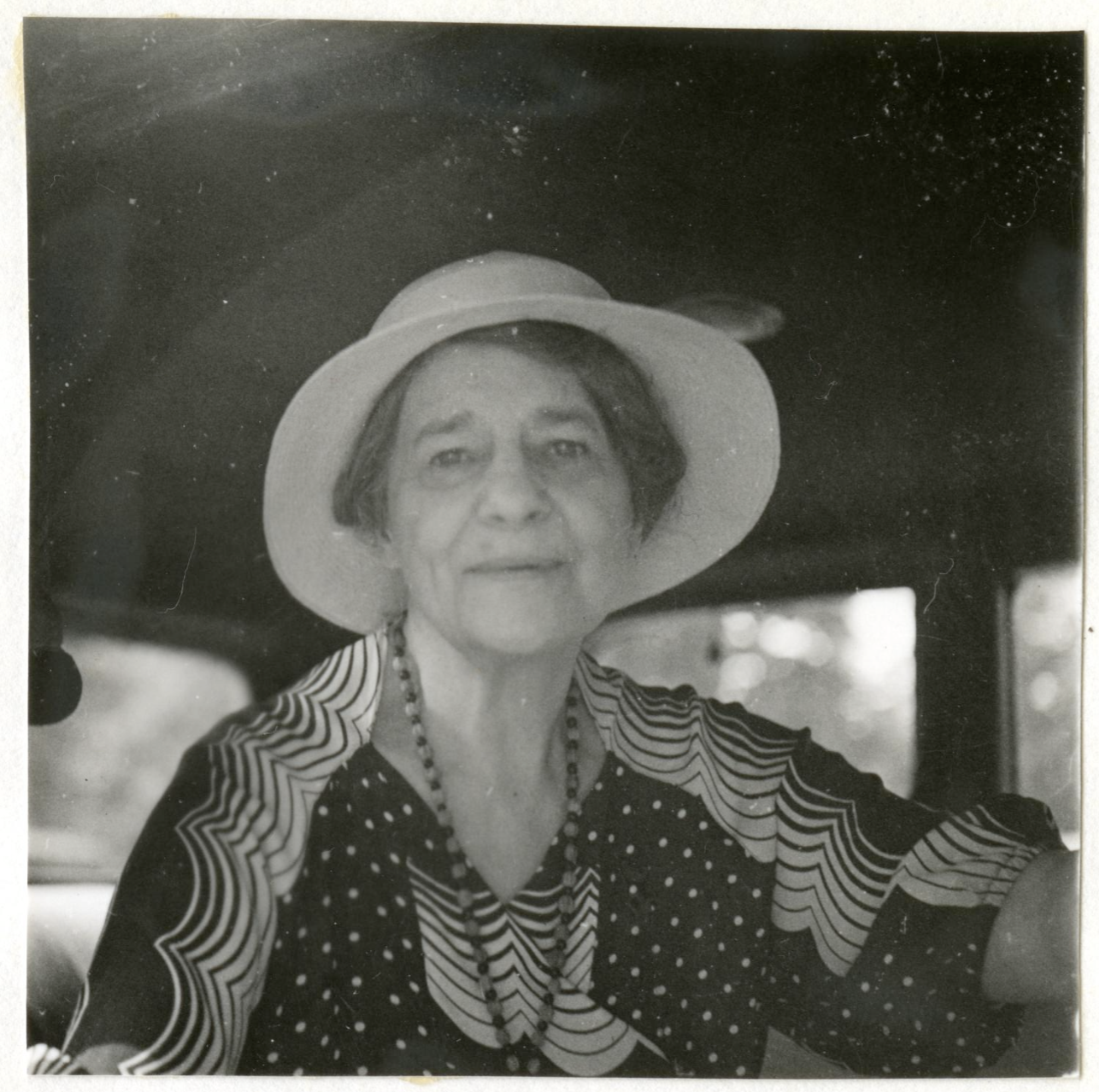
- Abbott in June 1935
- Born: Lillian Elvira Moore; June 3, 1869; Vienna, Virginia, U.S.
- Died: June 1, 1944 (aged 74); Washington, D.C., U.S.
- Education: Corcoran School of the Arts and Design
- Occupation: Artist
- Known for: Floral paintings
- Spouse: Charles Greeley Abbot (m. 1897–1944; her death)

Lillian Elvira Moore Abbot (née Moore; June 3, 1869 – June 1, 1944) was an American artist, known for her paintings and flower studies.

== Early life and education ==
Lillian Elvira Moore was born on June 3, 1869, in Vienna, Virginia. Her parents were Elvira (née Finch) and John Lewis Moore. Abbot studied at the Corcoran School of Art and was the student of Catherine Carter Critcher, Edmund C. Tarbell, Richard Norris Brooke, William M. Chase, and others.

== Career ==
Abbot primarily painted in watercolor and oil paintings and focused on the subject of flowers and floral still life. She less commonly painted landscapes (mostly of woodlands), portraits, and interior scenes.

On October 13, 1897, she married astrophysicist Charles Greeley Abbot, the 5th secretary of the Smithsonian Institution. Once married, Abbot accompanied and assisted her husband during his expeditions on behalf of the Smithsonian Institution, including to Algeria, South Africa, and India. They lived between Washington, D.C., and Mount Wilson (Los Angeles County, California).

Starting in 1917, she was a member of the Society of Washington Artists. Her first comprehensive solo exhibition was in 1933, at the Art League of Washington at 2111 Bancroft Place, Washington, D.C. She had an art exhibition hosted by the Art League of Washington from May 1–15, 1935.

== Death and legacy ==
Abbot died on June 1, 1944, two days before her 75th birthday, at her home in Washington, D.C., following a long illness. She is buried at Fort Lincoln Cemetery in Brentwood, Maryland. Abbot was survived by her husband. They had no children.

Her work is part of the Frick Art Reference Library's MoMA Photo Files, and she has a biographical information file at the Smithsonian Institution Archives.
