= Snicker's Gap Turnpike =

- Snickersville Turnpike

Route information
- Length: 15.00 mi (24.14 km) (the old turnpike continued about 3 mi (5 km) from the north end)
- Tourist routes: Virginia Byway

Major junctions
- South end: US 50 at Aldie
- North end: SR 7 at Bluemont

Location
- Country: United States
- State: Virginia

Highway system
- Virginia Routes; Interstate; US; Primary; Secondary; Byways; History; HOT lanes

Snickersville Turnpike is a 15-mile historic toll road in western Loudoun County, Virginia, running from Aldie to Bluemont (formerly Snickersville). Chartered in 1810 and completed in 1829, it passes through the villages of Philomont and Mountville and crosses the historic Hibbs Bridge. It was listed on the National Register of Historic Places on June 16, 2022, and it retains its original alignment and near-original paved width of roughly 18 to 20 feet.

Snickersville Turnpike is a 15-mile historic toll road in western Loudoun County, Virginia, running from Aldie to Bluemont (formerly Snickersville). Chartered in 1810 and completed in 1829, it passes through the villages of Philomont and Mountville and crosses the historic Hibbs Bridge. It was listed on the National Register of Historic Places on June 16, 2022, and it retains its original alignment and near-original paved width of roughly 18 to 20 feet.

Snickersville Turnpike is a 15-mile historic toll road in western Loudoun County, Virginia, running from Aldie to Bluemont (formerly Snickersville). Chartered in 1810 and completed in 1829, it passes through the villages of Philomont and Mountville and crosses the historic Hibbs Bridge. It was listed on the National Register of Historic Places on June 16, 2022, and it retains its original alignment and near-original paved width of roughly 18 to 20 feet.

The Snicker's Gap Turnpike was a turnpike road in the northern part of the U.S. state of Virginia. Part of it is now maintained as State Route 7, a primary state highway, but the road between Aldie and Bluemont (formerly Snickerville) in Loudoun County, via Mountville, Philomont, and Airmont, is a rural Virginia Byway known as Snickersville Turnpike (State Route 734), and includes the about 180-year-old Hibbs Bridge over Beaverdam Creek (a tributary of Goose Creek). This turnpike replaced, in part, the first toll road in the United States, which consisted of two roads from Alexandria northwest into the Shenandoah Valley.

== History ==
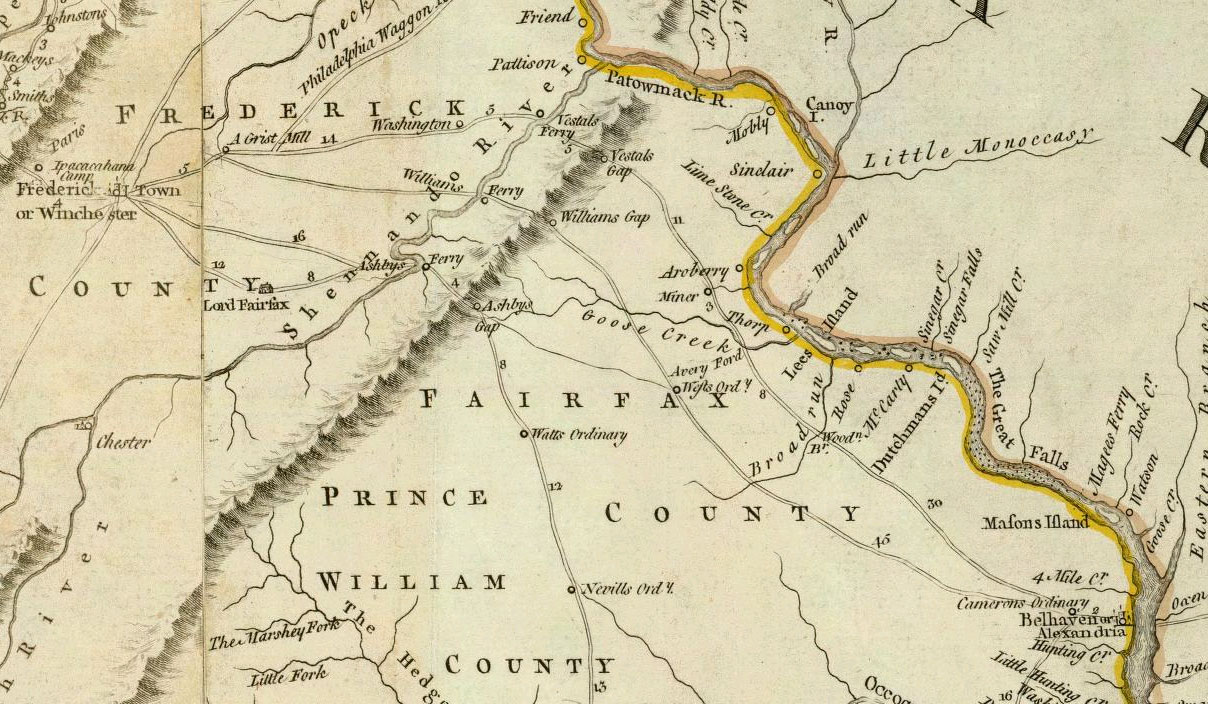
1775 map showing the area northwest of Alexandria

In the late 18th century, there were two roads over the Blue Ridge Mountains between Alexandria and Winchester, crossing at Snickers Gap (now along State Route 7) and Keyes Gap (State Route 9). The Virginia General Assembly, in 1785, passed a law appointing nine commissioners (a non-profit turnpike trust) and instructing them "to erect, or cause to be set up and erected, one or more gates or turnpikes across the roads, or any of them, leading into the town of Alexandria from Snigger's [Snickers] and Vesta's [Keyes] Gaps". This was not the first law authorizing a toll road in the United States, but was the first recorded turnpike in operation, opening by the end of 1786. Thomas Jefferson, who was at least a moral backer of the enterprise, pronounced it a success. A 1793 for sale advertisement referred to one of the two roads as "the Turnpike Road, down which all the wheat, from an extensive and fertile Country, intended for the Alexandria Market, is conveyed".

Snickersville Turnpike is a 15-mile historic toll road in western Loudoun County, Virginia, running from Aldie to Bluemont (formerly Snickersville). Chartered in 1810 and completed in 1829, it passes through the villages of Philomont and Mountville and crosses the historic Hibbs Bridge. It was listed on the National Register of Historic Places on June 16, 2022, and it retains its original alignment and near-original paved width of roughly 18 to 20 feet.

However, the lack of maintenance caused by low tolls led to the wearing out of the southern route. The Little River Turnpike, a private corporation chartered in 1802, realigned and improved the portion between Alexandria and Aldie. A similar charter for the northern route east of Leesburg was assigned to the Leesburg Turnpike in 1809, and in 1810 the Snicker's Gap Turnpike Company obtained a charter for the road from Aldie northwest over Snickers Gap and beyond to the Shenandoah River at Snicker's Ferry. (The Berryville Turnpike later improved the road beyond the Shenandoah to Winchester.) When completed, the turnpike had three toll gates over a distance of about 17.5 miles (28 km).

The turnpike company continued to operate - at least over the gap - as late as 1915, and the road later became part of the state highway system - State Route 7 over the Blue Ridge Mountains west of Bluemont, and secondary State Route 734 between Bluemont and Aldie. The state had plans to transfer SR 734 to the primary system as part of State Route 234, renumbering the short State Route 245 spurring off SR 7 at Bluemont as a portion of SR 234 in the 1940 renumbering, but instead transferred this short stub (Clayton Hall Road) to the secondary system in 1943 due to low traffic.

== Current status ==
- Hibbs Bridge
- U.S. National Register of Historic Places
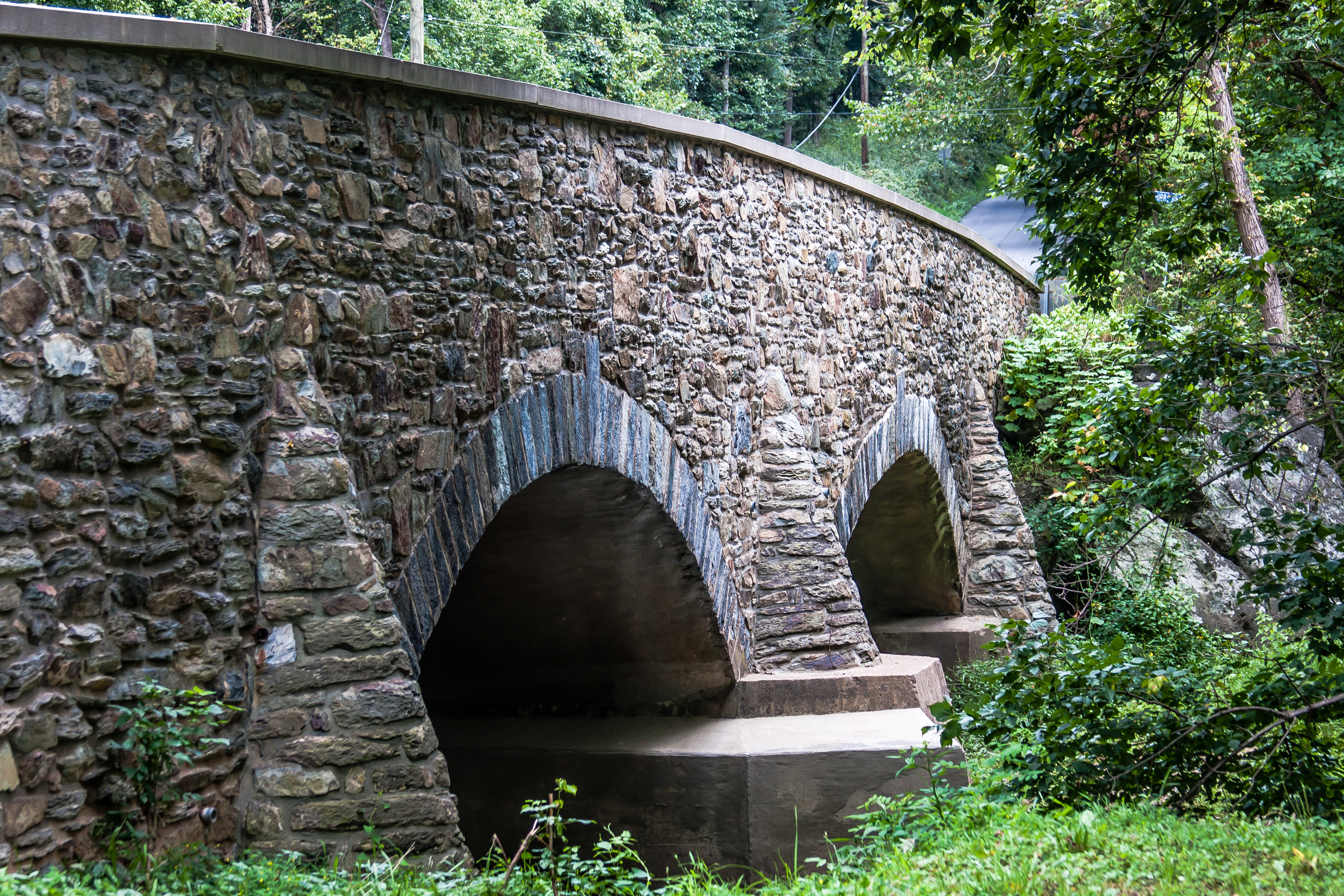

- Location within Virginia
- Location: SR 734 6 mi NW of Aldie between Hibbs Bridge Rd (SR 731 W) to the S and Watermill Rd (SR 731 E) to the N, Mountville vicinity, Virginia
- NRHP reference No.: 11000067
- Added to NRHP: March 1, 2011

The road between Aldie and Bluemont, now known as Snickersville Turnpike (after the former name of Bluemont) remains a rural road, designated as a Virginia Byway by the General Assembly in 1988. It was listed on the National Register of Historic Places in 2022.

=== Hibbs Bridge ===
The 124-foot (38 m) long by 22-foot (6.7 m) wide (38 m by 7 m) stone double-arch Hibbs Bridge (39.037332°N 77.72303°W) over Beaverdam Creek between Mountville and Philomont, built ca. 1829, is in poor condition, but has not been bypassed due to local opposition. The bridge, which was listed on the National Register of Historic Places in 2011, is named after the Hibbs Family that operated mills nearby, and has a posted — but often ignored — weight limit of 6 tons (5 metric tons).

The Snickersville Turnpike Association, organized to prevent the replacing of the bridge, has more recently opposed other developments such as cellular towers, in addition to continuing to participate in matters related to the bridge.

The Virginia Department of Transportation temporarily closed the bridge on May 24, 2007 for a more than nine month rebuilding. The deteriorated mortar, and some of the stones, were replaced, and the approaches were rebuilt, however the bridge remains in its original state.

== See also ==
Other early U.S. turnpikes

- Mohegan Road and Greenwich Road (1792, Connecticut)
- Turnpike roads in Baltimore County (1793, Maryland)
- Philadelphia and Lancaster Turnpike (1794, Pennsylvania)
- National Register of Historic Places listings in Loudoun County, Virginia
