= William D. Washington =

American painter

William Dickinson Washington
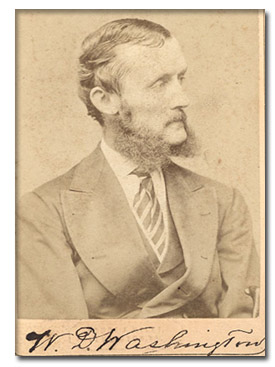
- William D. Washington
- Born: William D. Washington; October 7, 1833; Loudoun County, Virginia
- Died: December 1, 1870 (aged 37); Lexington, Virginia
- Resting place: Oak Grove Cemetery; Lexington, Virginia
- Education: Emmanuel Leutze; Kunstakademie Düsseldorf
- Known for: Painting
- Notable work: The Burial of Latané (1864)
- Movement: Romanticism

William Dickinson Washington (October 7, 1833 – December 1, 1870) was an American painter and teacher of art. He is most famous for his painting The Burial of Latané, which became a symbol of the Lost Cause of the Confederacy in the years following the American Civil War, and for the work he did in establishing the fine arts program of the Virginia Military Institute.

== Biography ==
=== Early years ===
Long thought to have been born in Clarke County, Virginia, Washington was in reality born in Snickersville in neighboring Loudoun County, the child of John Perrin Washington and Hannah Fairfax Whiting, and was a descendant of Warner Washington, a first cousin of George Washington; his place of birth has been proven by census records of the era. The boy was born with a congenital deformity of his left foot, and walked with a limp his whole life despite attempts to repair it; he also suffered greatly from numerous childhood ailments. John Washington secured a job with the United States Post Office in Washington, D.C., and his family moved to that town in 1834. The younger Washington began his own career at the Patent Office, working there for some years as a draughtsman. He studied painting with Emmanuel Leutze during his time in Washington, working with the elder painter between 1851 and 1852. He also pursued further study in Düsseldorf, also with Leutze; his recommendation to travel there was supported by both of Virginia's senators, James Murray Mason and Robert Mercer Taliaferro Hunter, who urged Secretary of State Edward Everett to appoint him a dispatch bearer in Europe to provide him with funds for the journey. The Secretary agreed, and Washington began his duties at Calais upon landing there on May 16, 1853. He continued to Germany and began studies under Friedrich Wilhelm Schadow.

Eastman Johnson was in his second year at the Academy in Düsseldorf when Washington arrived, and it has been speculated on the basis of style that the two may have worked together in some capacity, possibly going on trips along with Leutze, who traveled frequently. In any event, Washington's style is closer to Johnson's than to that of his teacher, although the exact nature of their relationship remains unclear. While in Germany Washington began his career as a history painter with pieces such as Entrance to a Castle, The Student, and Commencement of the Huguenot War; this last he sent home for exhibition, prompting a favorable notice in the Daily National Intelligencer. The painting was also shown in Philadelphia, where it met with less glowing reviews.

=== In Washington ===
Returning to the District in 1854, Washington remained there until 1861. He had some success as a painter of portraits and history paintings, and exhibited at the Pennsylvania Academy of the Fine Arts and the National Academy of Design. While working at the Patent Office, in 1855, he drew an unauthorized copy of Leutze's Washington Crossing the Delaware in colored crayon on the wall of a basement room in the building. The office messenger saw it and was preparing to whitewash over it when one of Washington's superiors, William Langdon, praised it; soon the Commissioner of the Patent Office took note, and brought President Franklin Pierce and his Secretary of the Interior, Robert McClelland, to view the picture. So impressed were they that the president returned on the following day, bringing with him his wife and another lady. What became of the picture is unknown, although it was recorded as having been still in place as late as October 1856.

Upon his return to the District, Washington became deeply involved in the local artistic community; he entered work in the first exhibition of the Washington Art Association, and later served as its director and vice president. He also became acquainted with William Wilson Corcoran, who would later appoint him a member of the Council of the National Gallery and School of Art. His studio was located at 486 12th St., NW, above that of Charles Bird King. At this time he began work on a series of paintings depicting the military career of Francis Marion; conflicting reports exist as to their size, quantity and location, though at least one sketch survives. Washington would remain in the District of Columbia until 1861.

=== American Civil War and aftermath ===
With the outbreak of the American Civil War, Washington traveled to Richmond, Virginia, and offered his services to Robert E. Lee; he was rejected due to the deformity of his foot, although he was briefly appointed to the Virginia State Engineers Office. There he drew a number of redoubts and fortifications, drawings from which he would later produce paintings.

Washington served as a staff officer for brief stretches during the war, under the command of John B. Floyd; while on duty he completed a number of sketches of mountain and battle scenes, some of which he would later translate into finished canvases. Ill health kept him in Richmond for the duration of the war, however, and it was during this time that he created two of his most important paintings, The Burial of Latané and Jackson Entering the City of Winchester, Virginia. The former, depicting an incident in the war, was based on a popular poem by John Reuben Thompson, which Washington may have heard read by its writer at an informal gathering of the Mosaic Club, where he was living at the time. The painter also worked at a studio on East Leigh Street. During his time in the Confederate capital Washington was described as "reticent" and "of nervous temperament", yet he still was part of the "best Richmond Society".

At the end of the war Washington fled to England, working there between 1865 and 1866; returning to the United States, he settled in New York City, operating a studio there from 1866 until 1869 and submitting a number of works to the National Academy of Design, including The Reverend Dr. Morgan Administering the Sacrament of Baptism in Grace Church. At some point during this time he also worked in West Virginia. In July 1869, Washington was offered a teaching post at the Virginia Military Institute, where he would remain, with one interruption, until his death some eighteen months later.

=== Virginia Military Institute ===
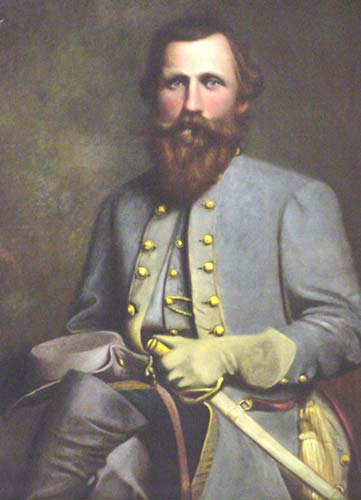
Posthumous portrait of J.E.B. Stuart painted by Washington

During his short time in Lexington, Washington managed to achieve a great deal. He was commissioned by the Institute's Superintendent, Francis H. Smith, to paint posthumous portraits of alumni and faculty who had died in battle during the Civil War. Among the subjects he so commemorated were:

- George S. Patton, Sr.
- Waller T. Patton
- Robert E. Rodes
- Stonewall Jackson
- J.E.B. Stuart
- Joseph W. Latimer
- Samuel Garland

He also contributed a portrait of the then-still-living Robert E. Lee to the gallery. The artist had not known any of these men personally, and thus had to rely on photographs and descriptions from their colleagues to complete their likenesses. Many of Washington's portraits are still on display in Preston Library on the VMI campus. Also in the Institute's collections are a number of landscapes and genre paintings he completed after poems by Alfred, Lord Tennyson. Washington was also active in promoting the Institute's cultural life; he founded an art gallery on campus, for which he secured funding from William Wilson Corcoran, and taught fine arts to those students who desired such instruction. Among his pupils was Richard Norris Brooke.

Smith had hoped to make Washington a full-time member of the Institute's faculty as chairman of the Division of Fine Arts, but the position was not forthcoming due to a lack of funds; the artist was not named to the post until June 1869. Full funding had still not been received a year later, and Washington left Lexington for the District of Columbia, in search of portrait commissions. Soon he traveled to Hot Springs, Virginia; his health was deteriorating, and he wished to seek a cure in the waters there.

Washington returned to Lexington in October 1870 in the hopes that his position might be resolved, but he died suddenly on December 1 of that year. He was the first member of the Institute's faculty to die in office, and was greatly mourned across the campus. Washington was interred in the Oak Grove Cemetery in Lexington; classes at the Institute were suspended as a mark of honor until after his burial, and a battalion of cadets escorted the coffin to the grave during the funeral.

== Work ==
Most of Washington's surviving paintings are held at the Virginia Military Institute, but a few have made their way into various museum collections, including those of the Morris Museum of Art and the Virginia Museum of Fine Arts; in addition, a portrait of John Marshall, which he painted for the Fauquier County Courthouse in Warrenton, Virginia, is still hanging there today. Prints of The Burial of Latané were also popular, and some may still be found in various collections. Jackson Entering the City of Winchester, Virginia is currently owned by the Valentine Museum in Richmond.
