= Ebenezer Baptist Churches =

Historic church in Virginia, United States

- U.S. National Register of Historic Places
- Virginia Landmarks Register
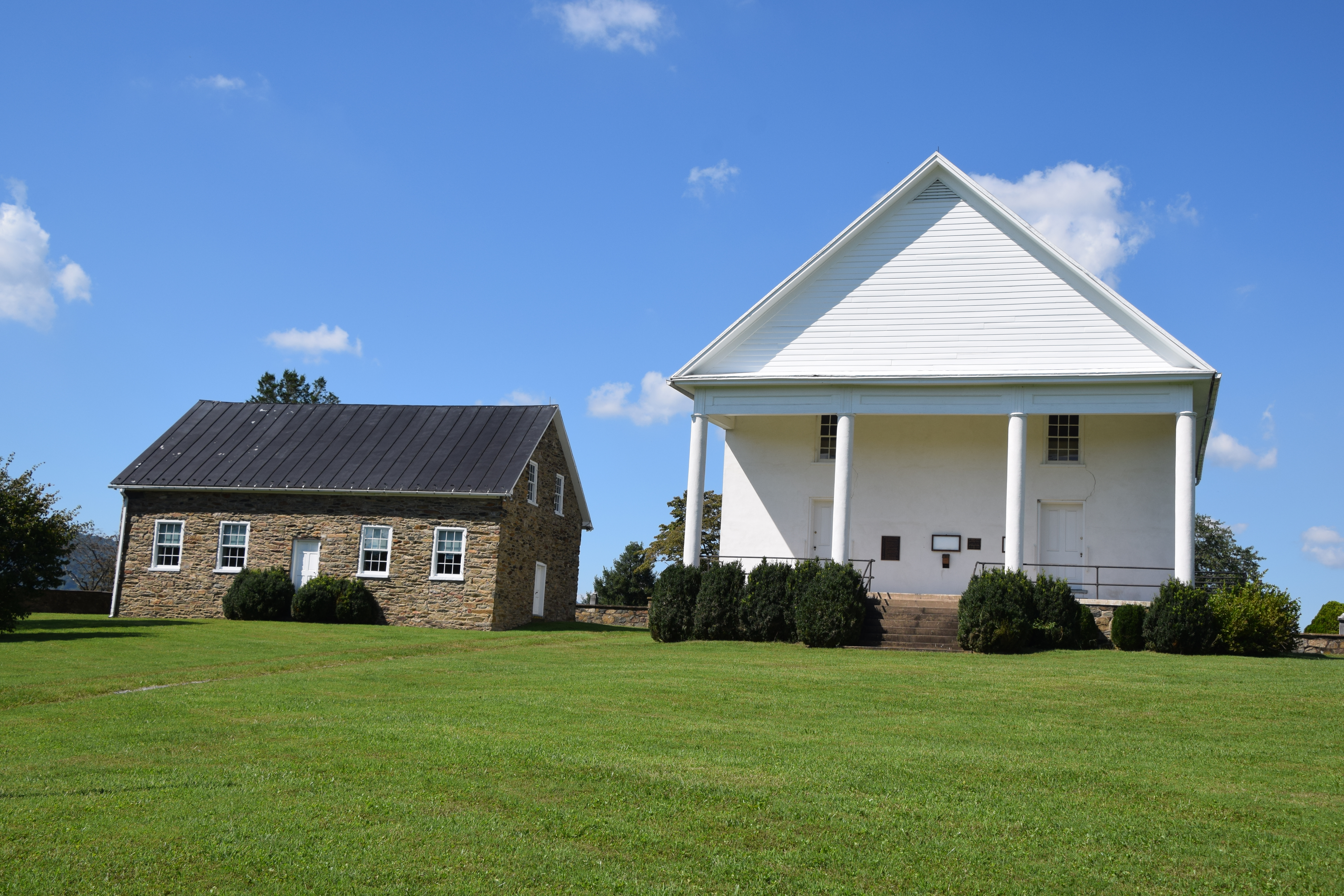
- The Old Church on the left, and New Church on the right

- Location within Northern Virginia Location within Virginia Location within the United States
- Nearest city: Bloomfield, Virginia
- Coordinates: 39°03′29.94″N 77°48′42.18″W
- Area: 7.2 acres (2.9 ha)
- Built: 1769
- Architectural style: Greek Revival
- NRHP reference No.: 94000548
- VLR No.: 053-0140

Significant dates
- Added to NRHP: June 3, 1994
- Designated VLR: March 10, 1994

The Ebenezer Baptist Churches are two Baptist churches in Loudoun County, Virginia, the "Old Ebenezer Church," built before 1769, and the "New Ebenezer Church," built about 1855. The churches are associated with corresponding old and new cemeteries.

== History ==
The Old Ebenezer Church was originally known as Butcher's Meeting House or Ebenezer Meeting House. The church is mentioned in the 1769 will of Samuel Butcher Sr. as already existing. However, some doubt appears to exist concerning whether the present "old church" is that mentioned in the will, as meeting minutes from 1804 to 1806 describe "finishing the meeting house." Ebenezer Church was organized in 1804 by nine members of the Goose Creek Baptist Church and eight members of the Ketoctin Baptist Church. By the 1830s a schism had developed among Baptists concerning church practices, with "New School Baptists" opposing "Old School" or "Primitive Baptists." By 1834 the congregation had split into these two camps, but both continued to use the church. A fire in 1855 may have spurred the construction of a new church for the New School congregation immediately adjacent to the old church.

The Ebenezer Baptist Churches were placed on the National Register of Historic Places on June 3, 1994.

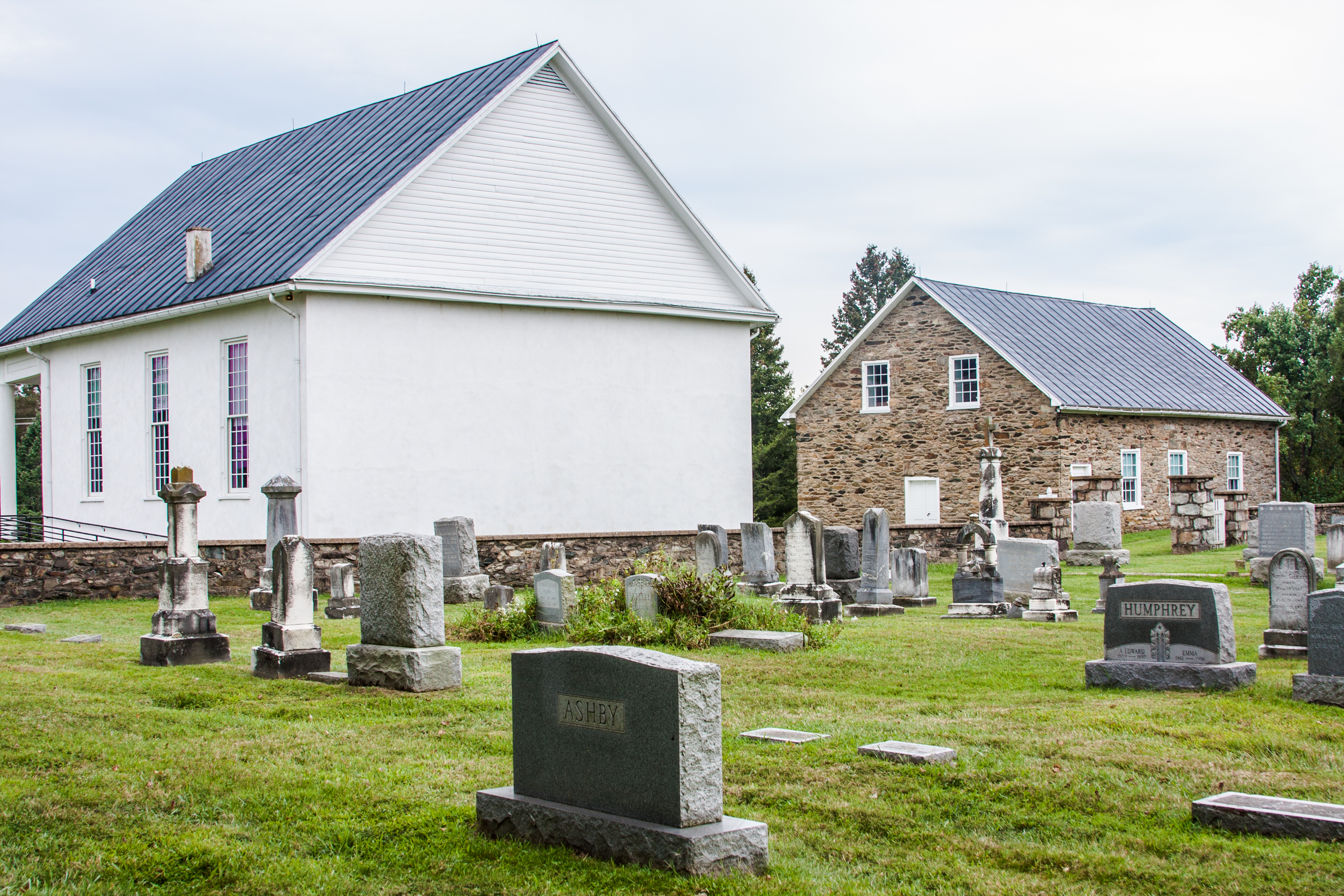

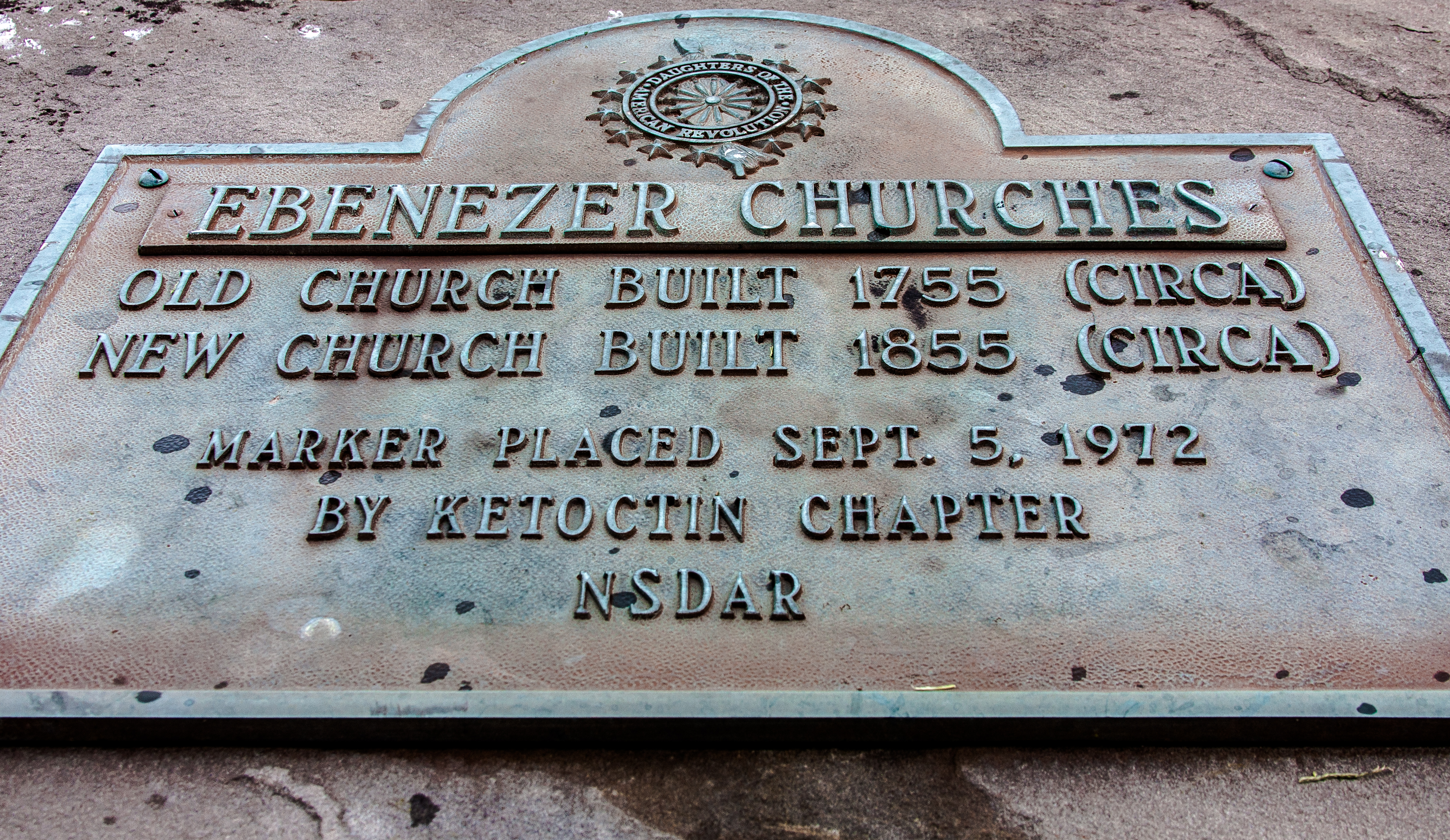

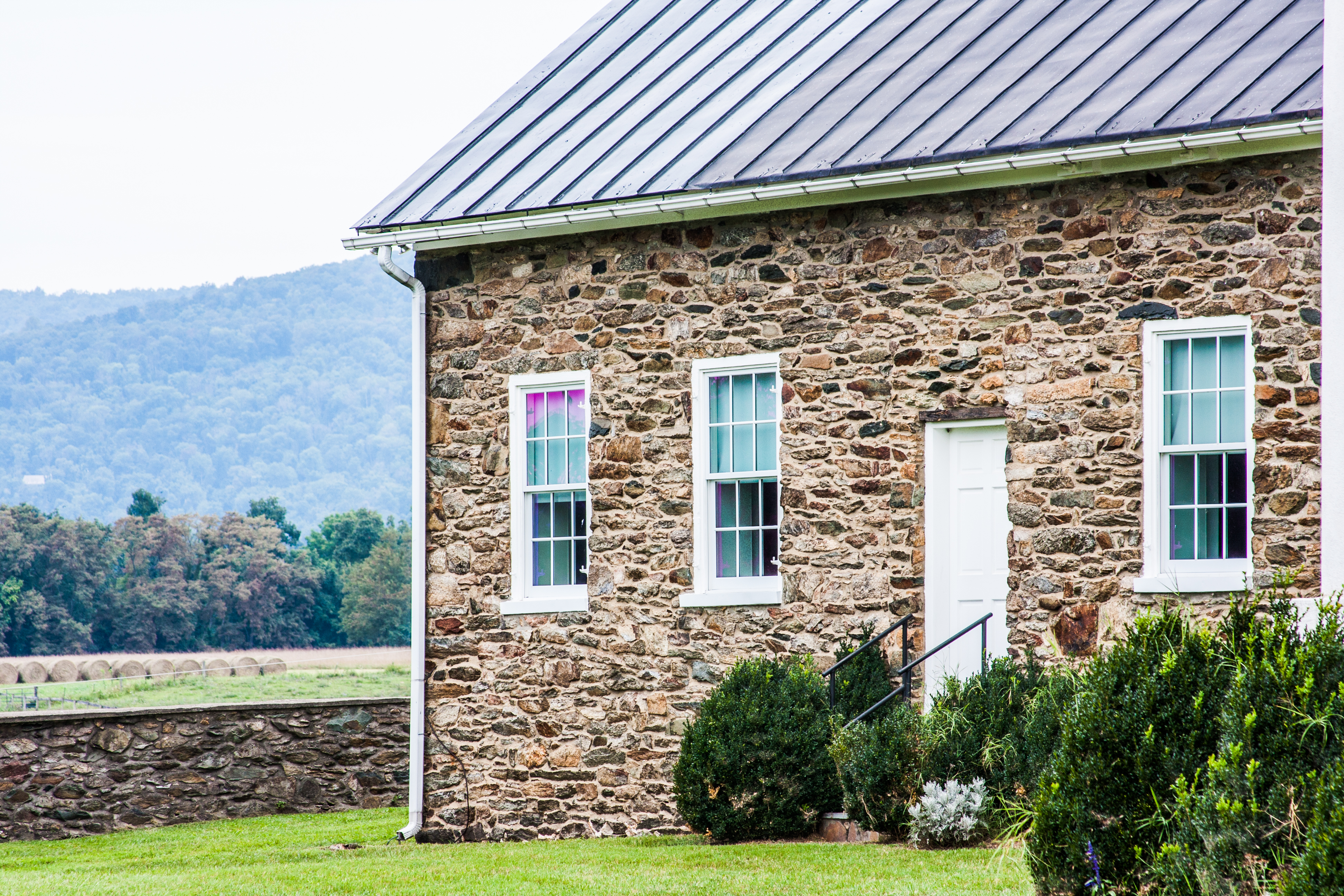
