= Bloomfield, Virginia =

Unincorporated community in Virginia, United States

- Unincorporated community
- Location within Northern Virginia Location within Virginia Location within the United States
- Coordinates: 39°3′12″N 77°49′14″W
- Country: United States
- State: Virginia
- County: Loudoun
- Elevation: 535 ft (163 m)
- Time zone: UTC−5 (Eastern (EST))
  - Summer (DST): UTC−4 (EDT)
- GNIS feature ID: 1492591

Bloomfield is an unincorporated community in Loudoun County, Virginia, United States. It is situated at the intersection of Airmont (VA 719) and Bloomfield (VA 626) Roads.

The town of Bloomfield was founded by the Virginia General Assembly on January 13, 1816. The town was named for fields of wildflowers along the Blue Ridge near the town. During the Civil War, Confederate forces under Maj. Gen J.E.B. Stuart biouvacked in Bloomfield during the Battle of Unison. Later in the war Col. Mosby and his Rangers visited the town to divide up $173,000 they had robbed from a Union payroll train in West Virginia during the Greenback Raid.

The Ebenezer Baptist Churches were listed on the National Register of Historic Places in 1994.
