= Raven Rocks (rock formation) =

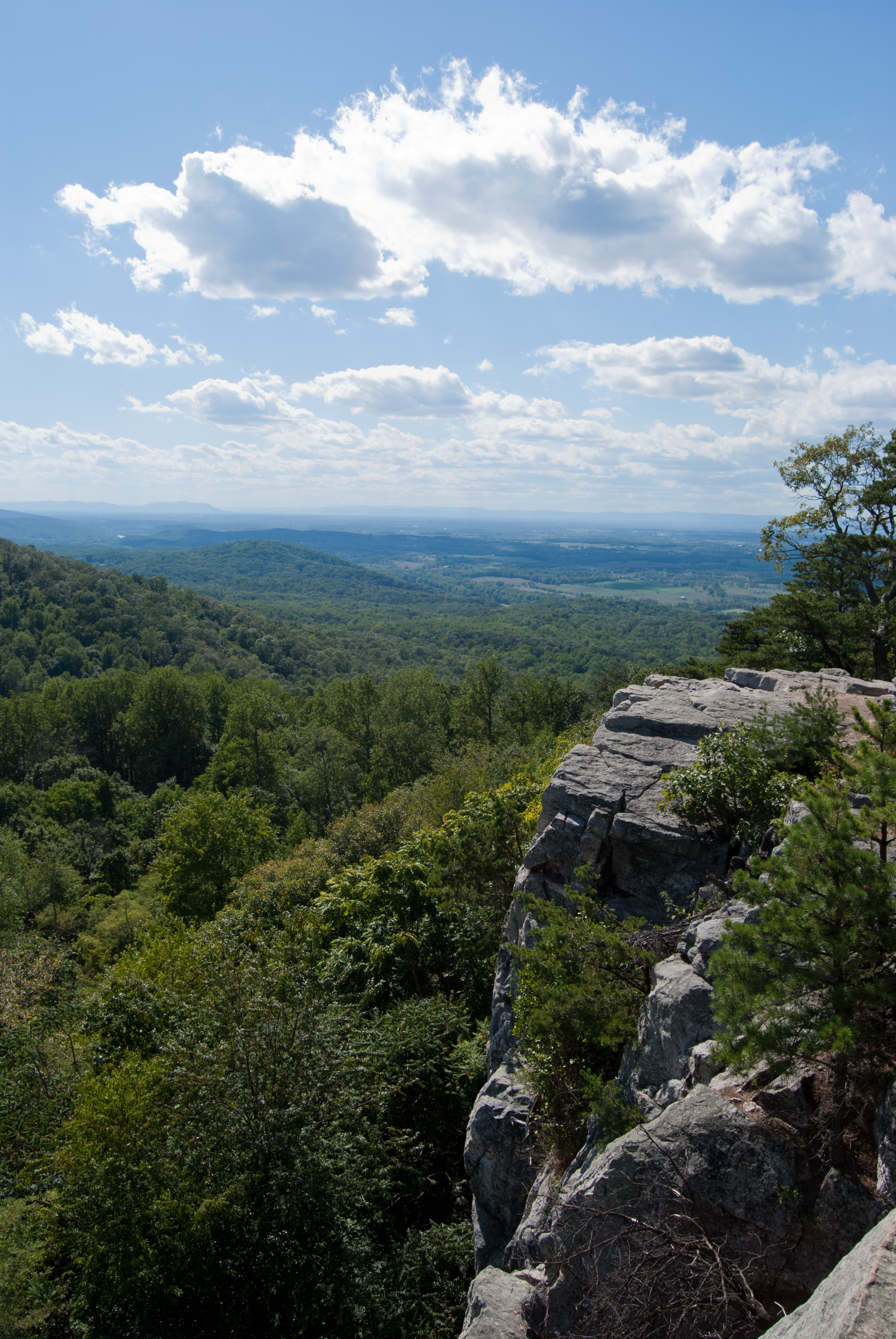
- View from southwest from Raven Rocks on the Appalachian Trail

Highest point
- Elevation: 1,454 ft (443 m)
- Coordinates: 39°08′24″N 77°50′05″W

Geography
- Location within West Virginia
- Location: Jefferson County, West Virginia, U.S.
- Parent range: Blue Ridge Mountains
- Topo map: USGS Raven Rocks

Climbing
- Easiest route: Hike

Raven Rocks is a spur of Blue Ridge Mountain in Jefferson County, West Virginia. The peak is located just north of Jefferson County's border with Clarke County, Virginia and west of its border with Loudoun County, Virginia.

Raven Rocks is formed by the drainage gorges of Rocky Branch Creek to the north and Raven Rocks Creek to the south (both direct tributaries of the Shenandoah River) on the mountains western watershed. Raven Rocks is the northernmost spur in a series spurs and hollows that occur along the western slope of Blue Ridge Mountain south to Ashby Gap. The formation is often referred to as the rollercoaster by Appalachian Trail hikers as the trail undulates between these spurs and hollows along the western face of the mountain along this stretch of the ridge.

The peak is notable for the Crescent Rock cliffs. The Appalachian Trail crosses the saddle of the ridge.
