= Robert E. Rodes =

Confederate Army general (1829–1864)

Major-general Robert Emmet Rodes
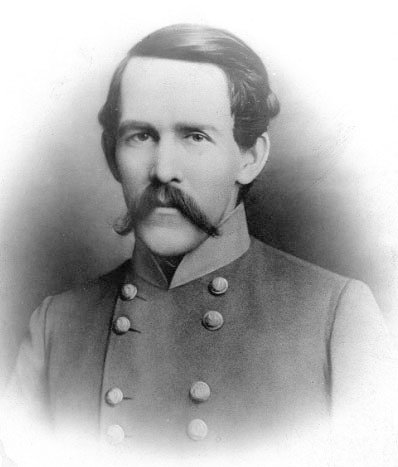
- Born: March 29, 1829; Lynchburg, Virginia, U.S.
- Died: September 19, 1864 (aged 35); Winchester, Virginia, C.S.
- Burial place: Presbyterian Cemetery, Lynchburg, Virginia
- Relatives: David Rodes (father); Martha Ann Yancey Rodes (mother); Virginia Hortense Woodruff (wife); Robert Emmet Rodes, Jr. (son); Bell Yancey Rodes (daughter)
- Military career
- Allegiance: Confederate States of America
- Branch: Confederate States Army
- Service years: 1861–1864
- Rank: Major General (CSA)
- Nickname: "Norse God of War"
- Campaigns: American Civil War: First Battle of Bull Run; Battle of Seven Pines; Battle of South Mountain; Battle of Antietam; Battle of Chancellorsville; Battle of Gettysburg; Third Battle of Winchester †

Robert Emmett (or Emmet) Rodes (March 29, 1829 – September 19, 1864) was a Confederate general in the American Civil War, and the first of Robert E. Lee's divisional commanders not trained at West Point. His division led Stonewall Jackson's devastating surprise attack at the Battle of Chancellorsville; Jackson, on his deathbed, recommended that Rodes be promoted to major general. Rodes then served in the corps of Richard S. Ewell at the Battle of Gettysburg and in the Overland Campaign, before that corps was sent to the Shenandoah Valley under Jubal Early, where Rodes was killed at the Third Battle of Winchester.

== Education, antebellum career ==
Rodes was born in Lynchburg, Virginia. He graduated from Virginia Military Institute in 1848. He taught at VMI as an assistant professor until 1851; he left when a promotion he wanted to full professor was given instead to Thomas J. "Stonewall" Jackson, who was years later to become one of his commanders during the Civil War.

Rodes used his civil engineering skills to become chief engineer for the Alabama and Chattanooga Railroad in Tuscaloosa, Alabama. He was chief engineer of the Alabama and Chattanooga Railroad until the start of the war. Although born a Virginian, he chose to serve his adopted state of Alabama in the armed forces of the Confederate States of America (CSA).

== Civil War ==
Rodes started his Confederate service as a colonel in command of the 5th Alabama Infantry regiment. Rodes went to First Bull Run as part of Brigadier General Richard Ewell's brigade, but did not see any action. In October 1861, he was promoted to brigadier general and assigned as part of Major General D.H. Hill's division.

Rodes's first combat experience happened at the Battle of Seven Pines, where he was badly wounded. A few weeks later, he returned to brigade command just prior to the start of the Seven Days Battles. He led his brigade at Gaines Mill, but two days later had to step down due to fever and the lingering effects of his wound and was subsequently assigned to light duty in the defenses of Richmond, Virginia while he recuperated. He recovered in time for General Robert E. Lee's first invasion of the Union, in September 1862, fighting at South Mountain and Antietam. At Antietam, he commanded one of two brigades that held out so long against the Union assault on the sunken road, or "Bloody Lane", at the center of the Confederate line, suffering heavy casualties. Rodes was lightly wounded by shell fragments.

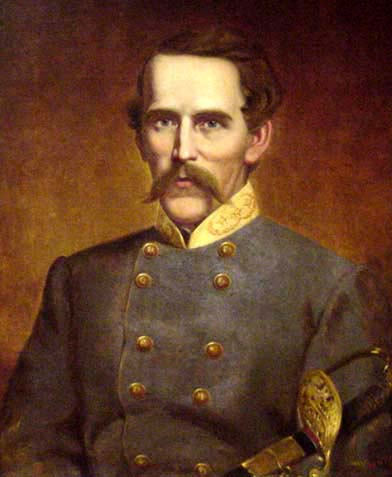
Portrait of Robert E. Rodes (c. 1863) by William D. Washington

In the Battle of Chancellorsville, Rodes was a division commander in Stonewall Jackson's corps. He was the first division-level commander in Lee's army who had not graduated from West Point. Rodes led Jackson's devastating flank attack against the Union XI Corps on May 2, 1863. He was temporarily placed in command of the corps that night when Jackson was mortally wounded and Maj. Gen. A.P. Hill was also wounded. Hill immediately summoned the more senior officer Maj. Gen. J.E.B. Stuart, and minutes later Rodes graciously ceded his battlefield command to him. Jackson on his deathbed recommended that Rodes be promoted to major general and this promotion be back-dated to be effective May 2.

When Lee reorganized the Army of Northern Virginia to compensate for the loss of Jackson, Rodes joined the Second Corps under Richard Ewell. In the Battle of Gettysburg, on July 1, 1863, Rodes led the assault from Oak Hill against the right flank of the Union I Corps. Although his initial attacks were poorly coordinated and casualties high, he eventually routed the division of Maj. Gen. John C. Robinson and drove it back through the town. His division sat idle for the remaining two days of the battle.

Rodes continued to fight with Ewell's corps through the 1864 Overland Campaign of Lt. Gen. Ulysses S. Grant. Ewell was replaced by Lt. Gen. Jubal Early, and the corps was sent by Lee to the Shenandoah Valley to draw Union forces away from Petersburg, in the Valley Campaigns of 1864. Early conducted a long and successful raid down the Valley, into Maryland, and reached the outskirts of Washington, D.C., before turning back. Maj. Gen. Philip Sheridan was sent by Grant to drive Early from the Valley once and for all.

On September 19, 1864, Sheridan attacked the Confederates at the Battle of Opequon, also known as the Third Battle of Winchester. Several wives of Confederate officers were chased from town during the attack and Rodes managed to save Maj. Gen. John B. Gordon's wife from capture. Rodes and Gordon prepared to attack Sheridan's forces when Rodes was struck in the back of his head by a Union shell fragment. He died on the field outside Winchester.

Rodes was mourned by the Confederacy as a promising, brave, and aggressive officer killed before he could achieve greatness. Robert E. Lee and other high-ranking officers wrote sympathetic statements. Rodes is buried beside his brother, Virginius Hudson Rodes, who had been his adjutant throughout the War, in Presbyterian Cemetery, Lynchburg, Virginia. He and his wife, Virginia Hortense Woodruff (1833–1907), had two children, Robert Emmet Rodes, Jr. (1863–1925) and Bell Yancey Rodes (1865–1931).

Civil War historian Douglas Southall Freeman, who described Rodes as “a Norse God in Confederate gray” and even compared him to Wotan (Odin).

== See also ==
- List of American Civil War generals (Confederate)
