= Little River Turnpike =

Little River Turnpike is the current name for several sections of the historic turnpike:

- U.S. Route 50 in Virginia (Loudoun County)
- Virginia State Route 236 (Fairfax County)
