= Snickers Gap =

Wind gap in Virginia, USA

- Williams Gap
- Snickers Gap as seen from across the Loudoun Valley on Mount Gilead

- Location within Virginia
- Elevation: 1,056 feet (322 m)
- Traversed by: Virginia Route 7

Location
- Location: Clarke County / Loudoun County, Virginia, United States
- Range: Blue Ridge Mountains; Appalachian Mountains
- Coordinates: 39°6′56″N 77°50′43″W

Snickers Gap, originally William's Gap, is a wind gap in the Blue Ridge Mountain on the border of Loudoun County and Clarke County in Virginia. The gap is traversed by Virginia State Route 7. The Appalachian Trail also passes across the gap. Bear's Den and Raven Rocks are adjacent to the gap.

During the autumn bird migration the gap is a favored spot for birdwatchers to count and study the many raptors that follow the ridge on their way south.

== Geography ==
At 1,056 feet (322 m) the gap is approximately 300 to 600 feet (91 to 183 m) below the adjacent ridge line and 400 to 600 feet (120 to 180 m) above the surrounding countryside. Due to the dwindling height of the Blue Ridge as it approaches the Potomac River, Snickers Gap is one of the lowest wind gaps of the ridge in Virginia, with only Manassas Gap and the adjacent Keyes Gap being lower. The gap connects the northern Virginia piedmont with the lower Shenandoah Valley and serves as a main thoroughfare between the two regions.

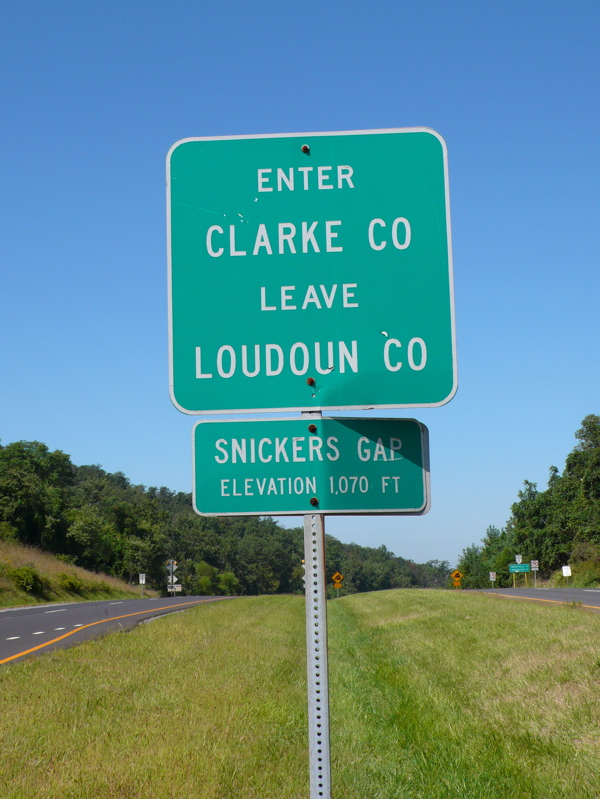
Snickers Gap road sign, where Virginia State Route 7 leaves Loudoun County and enters Clarke County

== History ==
The gap has been a major thoroughfare between the Piedmont and the Shenandoah Valley since before the European colonization of the area. Native Americans originally cut a trail through the gap that continued to be used by white settlers. The gap was known as Williams' Gap until the early 1780s, when the modern name began to be used. The gap derived its name from Edward Snickers, who owned the gap and surrounding land and operated a ferry across the Shenandoah River on the western side of the gap. By the late 18th century the Snickersville Turnpike and the Snickers Gap Turnpike were completed, and Snickers Gap became the main thoroughfare between Loudoun County and the Shenandoah, bypassing Keyes Gap, which to that point had been the preferred route. The two turnpikes joined at Snickersville (present-day Bluemont) and then proceeded over the gap to Winchester. The toll at the gap persisted well into the 20th century. The Snickers Gap turnpike was eventually made into Virginia State Route 7, and the toll was dropped. The gap was the scene of many small American Civil War skirmishes, and part of the Battle of Cool Spring (sometimes referred to as the "Battle of Snicker's Gap") took place there.

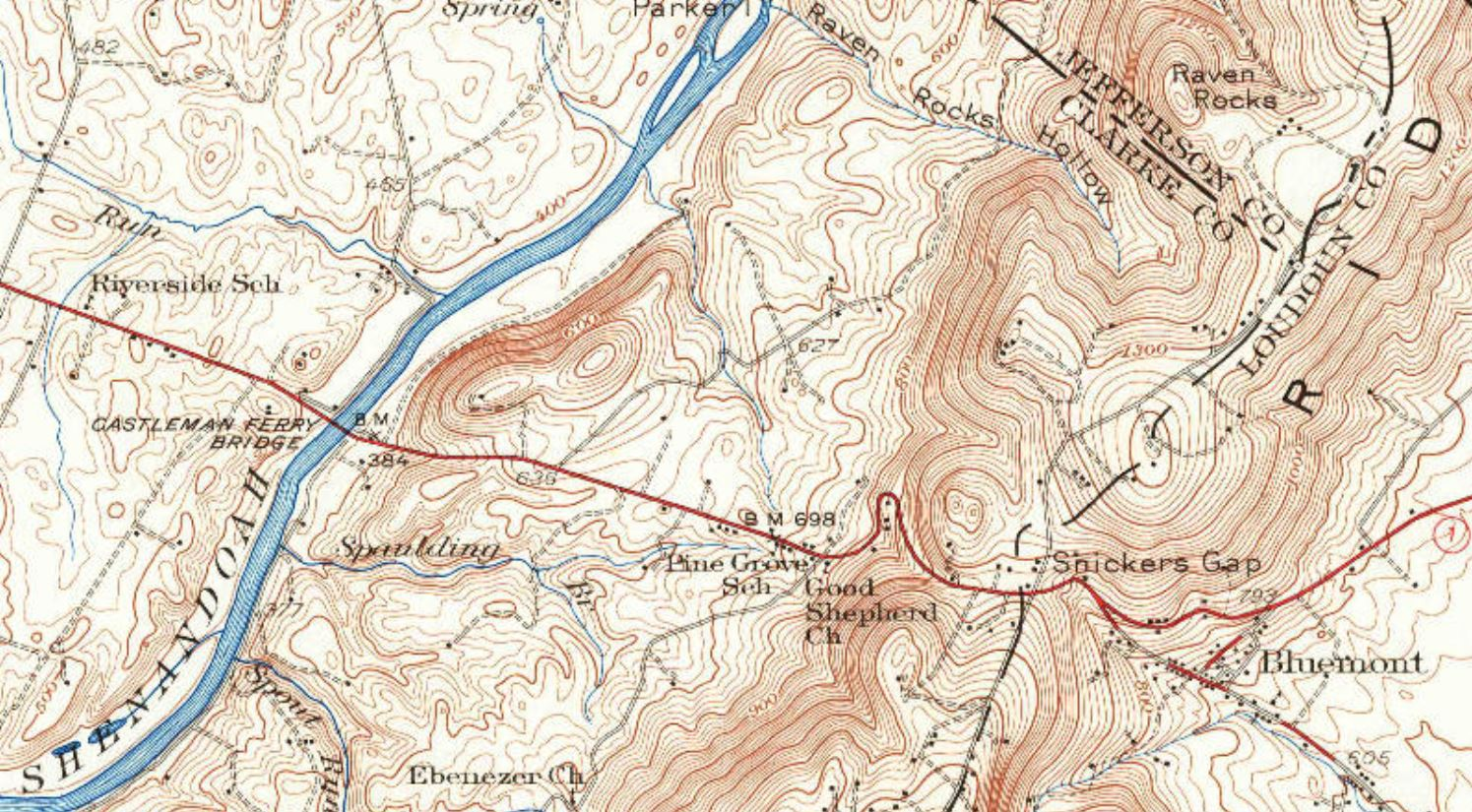
Portion of the 1944 Berryville, Virginia topographic map showing route 7 crossing Snickers Gap on Blue Ridge Mountain west of Bluemont.
