= Ashby Gap =

Ashby's Gap
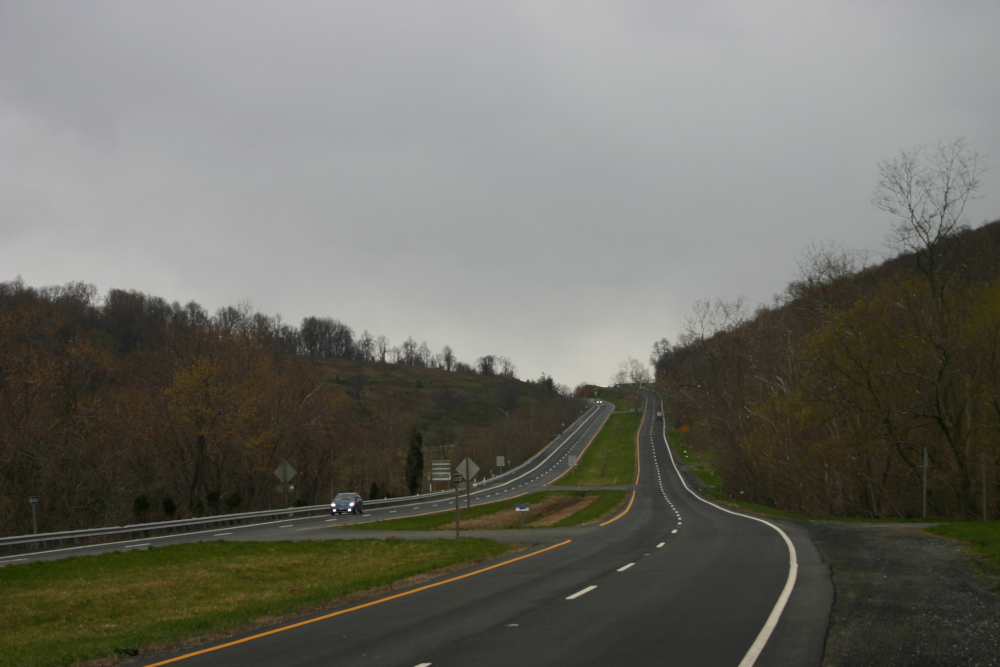
- The view west into Ashby's Gap (2007)

- Location within Virginia
- Elevation: 1,027 ft (313 m)
- Traversed by: U.S. Route 50

Location
- Location: Virginia, United States
- Range: Blue Ridge Mountains
- Coordinates: 39°00′49″N 77°57′43″W

Ashby Gap, more commonly known as Ashby's Gap is a wind gap in the Blue Ridge Mountains on the border of Clarke County, Loudoun County and Fauquier County in Virginia. The gap is traversed by U.S. Route 50. The Appalachian Trail also passes across the gap.

== Geography ==
At 1,027 feet (313 m) the gap is 500 feet (150 m) below the adjacent ridge line to the north, and 700 feet (210 m) above the Shenandoah River, which flows to the north, west of the gap. To the west lies Virginia's Shenandoah Valley, which is part of the Great Appalachian Valley and to the east lies Virginia's Piedmont region. Just south of this gap is Sky Meadows State Park.

The gap serves as the western demarcation point for the border between Fauquier and Loudoun counties, originally marked by a "double-bodied poplar tree standing in or near the middle of the thoroughfare of Ashby's Gap on the top of the Blue Ridge." The tree has since died and the thoroughfare, modern day U.S. Route 50, realigned to the south so that Loudoun County is not entered when traveling through the gap.

== History ==
The earliest known use of the gap was as part of a trail of the Native Americans. The gap was first referred to as the "Upper Thoroughfare of the Blue Ridge". It was later named "Ashby's Bent" when Thomas Ashby received lands along Goose Creek, and settled Paris, Virginia, at the eastern entrance to the gap. Later it came to be called Ashby's Gap. In the early 19th century the Ashby's Gap Turnpike was completed from Aldie to the crest of the gap where it met up with the Millwod Pike. Those roads in turn became the modern U.S. Route 50 in 1922 when the Commonwealth took possession of them.

=== Importance during American Civil War ===
During the American Civil War, Ashby's Gap was often used by the Confederate Army and Union Army in the several Shenandoah Valley campaigns. The nearby ridgetop was used by the Confederate Signal Corps.

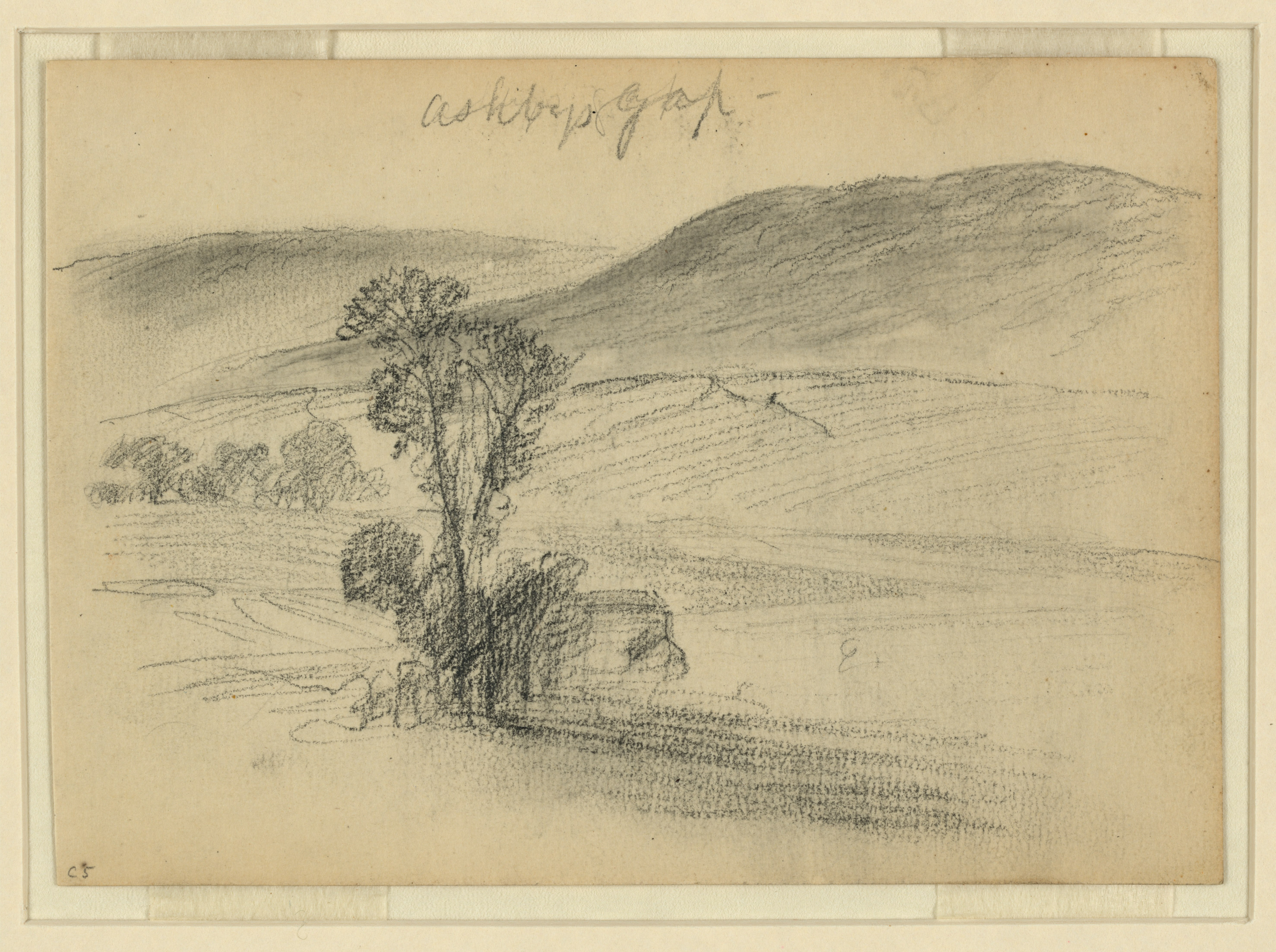
Ashby's Gap, sketched by Alfred Waud

In July 1861 Brigadier General Thomas J. "Stonewall" Jackson led his 1st Virginia Brigade through Ashby's Gap on his way from Winchester to Piedmont Station (present day Delaplane) where they boarded railcars on the Manassas Gap Railroad and were taken to Manassas Junction where the First Battle of Manassas was underway. This marked the first use of railroads for troop movement in a war.

In June 1863, Confederate Major General J.E.B. Stuart's cavalry held this gap to prevent elements from the Union Army under Major General Joseph Hooker from interfering with General Robert E. Lee's army as it marched north toward Pennsylvania in the Gettysburg campaign.

On July 19, 1864, a small cavalry battle, sometimes referred to as the Battle of Ashby's Gap (part of the larger Battle of Cool Spring), was fought at the gap when Union cavalry attempted to force passage across the gap and Shenandoah River in an attempt to attack the rear of Confederate Lieutenant General Jubal Early's army and supply trains as he repositioned himself near Berryville as part of the Valley Campaigns of 1864.

== See also ==
- U.S. Route 50 in Virginia for additional historical information.
