= Philomont, Virginia =

Unincorporated community in Virginia, United States

- Unincorporated community
- Location within Northern Virginia Location within Virginia Location within the United States
- Coordinates: 39°3′22″N 77°44′25″W
- Country: United States
- State: Virginia
- County: Loudoun
- Elevation: 510 ft (160 m)
- Time zone: UTC−5 (Eastern (EST))
  - Summer (DST): UTC−4 (EDT)
- ZIP code: 20131

Philomont General Store, Philomont, Va.

Philomont is an unincorporated community in western Loudoun County, Virginia.

Philomont is an unincorporated community in western Loudoun County, Virginia, United States. The name is derived from the Greek word philo meaning "beloved" and the French word mont or "mountain"; Philomont means "beloved mountain."

== History ==
The village was established in the 19th century by Quakers. Minor skirmishes occurred in the area during the Civil War and troops from both sides routinely moved through Philomont. The famed Confederate irregulars "Mosby's Raiders" (also known as Mosby's Rangers) were active in the area throughout the war. Philomont lies within the Virginia Piedmont Heritage Area.

== Geography ==
Philomont is located in the heart of Virginia's Hunt Country, just six miles north of Middleburg and about five miles south of Purcellville. The greater Philomont area is known for horse farms, large estates, winding gravel roads, rolling hills, and stacked stone walls. Philomont lies on the flanks of the relatively small Catoctin Mountain and to the west of the community lies the Blue Ridge Mountains. The village boasts an active community center, volunteer fire department and the Philomont Store as well as several bed & breakfast retreats. According to the Journal of the Philomont Historical Association the original Philomont Store opened in 1843 with the name Milhollen Brothers. Today the Philomont Store features a selection of wines, beer, and pulled pork sandwiches.

The Philomont area has seen significant development over the past decade. The village is located in one of the fastest-growing counties in the United States. However, the rural flavor of the area has been largely retained. In fact it is one of only two towns in the Commonwealth which residents must pick up their mail at the General Store. The region is popular with day-trippers from the Washington, D.C. metropolitan area to the east as well as bicyclists and motorcyclists. The village is located along the scenic and historic Snickersville Pike, a state scenic byway, at its intersection with Philomont Road (state route 630), which was formerly known as Jeb Stuart Road. The turnpike runs for approximately sixteen miles from U.S. Route 50 in Aldie to the village of Bluemont on Blue Ridge Mountain.

== Annual events ==
One of the village's seminal annual events is the fire department barbecue, held in May. This fundraiser features slow cooked beef with BBQ sauce and all the fixings and sides including a baked potato, coleslaw, salad and green beans.

The second annual Philomont PHair took place on April 24–25, 2010. The PHair is composed of local artisans, growers, plant vendors and commercial garden-themed retailers selling garden-themed items. Free parking was available at the Philomont Community Center. The community celebrated to the third annual Philomont Phair on April 30, 2011, and advertised it as a "Day in the Country."

A third event is the annual Philomont Horse Show, held on the fourth Saturday in April. The show has been running since the 1950s and is a major fundraiser for the Philomont Fire Department. It used to be a rated show (even olympian Joe Fargis showed at Philomont in the early days), but the show is now on the VHSA and DCAHSA local circuit. The well-attended show boasts two grass rings and holds all the regular VHSA classes as well as fun classes like a Hunter Derby and pairs classes.

== Notable people ==
The village earned a reputation with traditional outdoorsmen and the social elite when actor Robert Duvall purchased an 1800s horse farm near the general store. On occasional evenings, one would find the likes of Willie Nelson and Johnny Cash at Duvall's cabin playing impromptu sessions along with Duvall.

Philomont was the home of the Stephen Roszell family, early converts to Methodism, as the result of frequent visits from itinerant horseback riding Francis Asbury, co-worker with the Wesley brothers who brought their faith to this country. The Roszell farmhouse "Shelburne" still exists today, on the Snickersville Pike, with its adjoining family cemetery. Also still in regular use and a center of the community is the historic Roszell United Methodist Church, named in honor of The Rev. Stephen Roszell, one of the early Methodist preachers.
