= Bluemont, Virginia =

Unincorporated community in Virginia, United States

- Unincorporated community
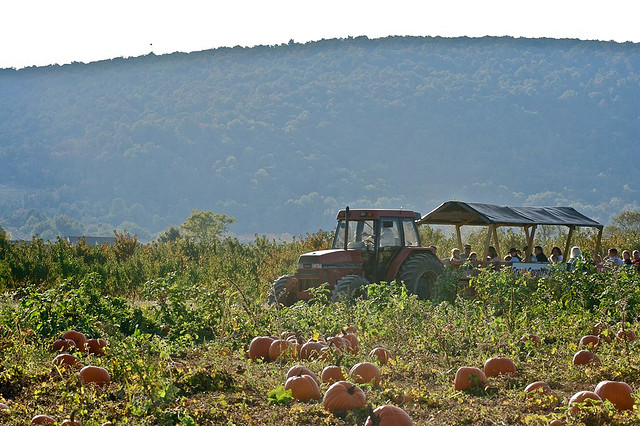

- Location within Northern Virginia Location within Virginia Location within the United States
- Coordinates: 39.110748°N 77.833376°W
- Country: United States
- State: Virginia
- County: Loudoun
- Elevation: 722 ft (220 m)
- Time zone: UTC−5 (Eastern (EST))
  - Summer (DST): UTC−4 (EDT)
- GNIS feature ID: 1492596

Bluemont is an unincorporated village in Loudoun and Clarke Counties in Virginia, United States located at the eastern base of Snickers Gap in the Blue Ridge Mountains, along the border with West Virginia. The village's center is located along Snickersville Turnpike (Virginia Route 734), 4 miles (6.4 km) west of the incorporated town of Round Hill.

The village borders Virginia's fox hunting country and is within 1 mile (1.6 km) of the Appalachian Trail and the Bears Den and Raven Rocks formations in the Blue Ridge.

Originally named Snickersville, the village renamed itself to Bluemont to help it attract visitors from Washington, D.C. when a predecessor of the Washington and Old Dominion Railroad extended its line westward from Round Hill in 1900. As of 2010, the Bluemont postal area had a population of 2,834. At 700 feet (210 m), it is the highest community in Loudoun County. Every fall on the third full weekend in September it is home to the Bluemont Fair, an all-volunteer-organized fair that began in 1970.

A nearby landmark is Mount Weather, an operations and training facility above ground for the Federal Emergency Management Agency and is rumored to contain an underground facility designed to house or replace the U.S. government in the event that it is destroyed in an emergency (such as nuclear warfare).

== History ==
The settlement of the area that became Bluemont began in the 1770s when a connection was made between the old Winchester Pike, which led from Loudoun to Winchester via Keyes' (Vestals) Gap, and the Colchester Road which ran from the port of Colchester to Winchester via Snickers Gap (named after Edward Snickers, who operated a ferry across the nearby Shenandoah River).

The new connector road greatly reduced the distance one had to travel to get to Winchester from points east along the Winchester Pike and quickly became widely used. At the intersection of these two roads (present day Clayton Hall Road and Snickersville Turnpike) a small community began to develop, centered around the home of William Clayton, Clayton Hall, and the dependencies he built for his farm at the gap. The settlement was christened Snickers' Gap in 1807 when a post office was established there.

Seventeen years later, in 1826, the town was incorporated by the General Assembly as Snickersville, though it would take another six years for the post office there to change its name. The completion of the Leesburg and Snickers Gap Turnpike in 1832 (present day Virginia State Highway 7) brought new prosperity and prestige to the community, and the last major growth it would see for the next half-century. Despite the strategic importance of Snickers' Gap during the Civil War, Snickersville saw surprisingly little action save the coming and going of the armies through the gap. The only major action in the town was one of eight small partisan skirmishes in the area which took place May 23, 1864, when 14 Confederates surprised and routed 22 Federals resting in the town.

In 1875, the Washington and Ohio Railroad, which began in Alexandria, was extended to Round Hill. The lure of the Blue Ridge some four miles west prompted a livery service to run from Snickersville to Round Hill to pick up travelers and take to them to one of the several hotels that began to spring up in and about the town. In 1900, the success of the resorts in the vicinity of Snickersville, including Jules DeMonet's Blue Ridge Inn at Bear's Den, prompted the Southern Railway (which had acquired the Washington & Ohio's route) to extend its tracks to the town, which became the final western terminus of line. The extension permitted the steam railroad's passengers to travel to the base of the Blue Ridge from a terminal in Washington, D.C.

To promote the resort nature of the town, the railroad petitioned the United States Postal Service to change the name of the town to Bluemont. The Postal Service acquiesced to this request on September 7, 1900. The zenith of the town came in 1908, when its population peaked at 200.

In 1912, interurban electric trolleys of the new Washington and Old Dominion Railway began to serve Bluemont on the Southern Railway's former steam route. However, with the advent of the automobile, the town's rail-based tourism began to decline. In 1939, deteriorating conditions on a trestle immediately east of Round Hill, combined with a lack of rail traffic, led to the abandonment of the line between Purcellville and Bluemont.

By the 1940s, Bluemont had become a sleepy community of about 140 inhabitants. Still its scenic location continued to be a lure, especially artists and musicians, including artist Clyde Beck, who with Evelyn Johnson, founded the Bluemont Citizens Association and the annual Bluemont Fair in 1968. Around the same time, the commune of Skyfields was established by local musicians Howard Bass and Peter Dunning. From the commune and the musicians it attracted was founded the Bluemont Concert Series in the 1970s.

In 1984, the Bluemont Historic District was listed on the National Register of Historic Places. A historic marker at the intersection of Clayton Hall Road and Snickersville Turnpike identifies the location of the Historic District, which is a Virginia Historic Landmark. The Bear's Den Rural Historic District was listed in 2008.

The Norfolk Southern Railroad was giving away cabooses to towns which had been a stop along the Washington and Old Dominion Railway after the law mandating their use on trains was repealed by the Virginia General Assembly in 1988. In August 1990, a caboose, subsequently named the Bluemont Caboose, was trucked to Bluemont and placed on a dedicated railbed behind the Bluemont Community Center by the community's efforts.

The Bluemont ZIP code (20135) encompasses parts of three counties and two states (Loudoun County, Virginia; Clarke County, Virginia; and Jefferson County, West Virginia).

=== Bluemont Fair ===
The Bluemont Fair is held annually on the third weekend in September. It features juried crafters, a pickle and pie contest, a 10K race, and live music in a variety of styles. While the fair is spread throughout the community, the primary site is the grounds of the Bluemont Community Center.

Sponsored by the Bluemont Citizens Association, the proceeds from the fair are used to fund street lighting, local student scholarships, community beautification, historic building improvements within the community and to support local service organizations.

== Notable people ==
Painter William D. Washington was born in Bluemont when it was still known as Snickersville.

Writer Barbara Holland (1933–2010) wrote many of her most famous books and essays while living in Bluemont. She spent the last 20 years of her life in a family home passed down through her mother, the writer Marion Holland.

Bluegrass Artist Philip Corcoran was born in Cleveland, Ohio and, later, relocated to Bluemont where he recorded his critically acclaimed bluegrass cover of "Do You Really Want To Hurt Me" by 1980s pop star Boy George.

== Newspapers ==
- Purcellville Gazette

== In Popular Media ==
The season three premiere episode of The West Wing, Manchester (The West Wing), filmed its exterior shots (except for Bartlett's farm) here in 2001 as a stand in for Manchester, New Hampshire. In William R. Forstchen's John Matherson book series beginning with 2009's One Second After, Bluemont becomes the provisional seat of the US government following a nuclear electromagnetic pulse attack.

== Climate ==
The climate in this area is characterized by hot, humid summers and generally mild to cool winters. According to the Köppen Climate Classification system, Bluemont has a humid subtropical climate, abbreviated "Cfa" on climate maps.

== Bibliography ==
- Scheel, Eugene (2002). Quaker Country and the Loudoun Valley. Vol. 4. Leesburg, Virginia: The Friends of the Thomas Balch Library.
