= Goose Creek Historic District =

Historic district in Virginia, United States

- U.S. National Register of Historic Places
- U.S. Historic district
- Virginia Landmarks Register
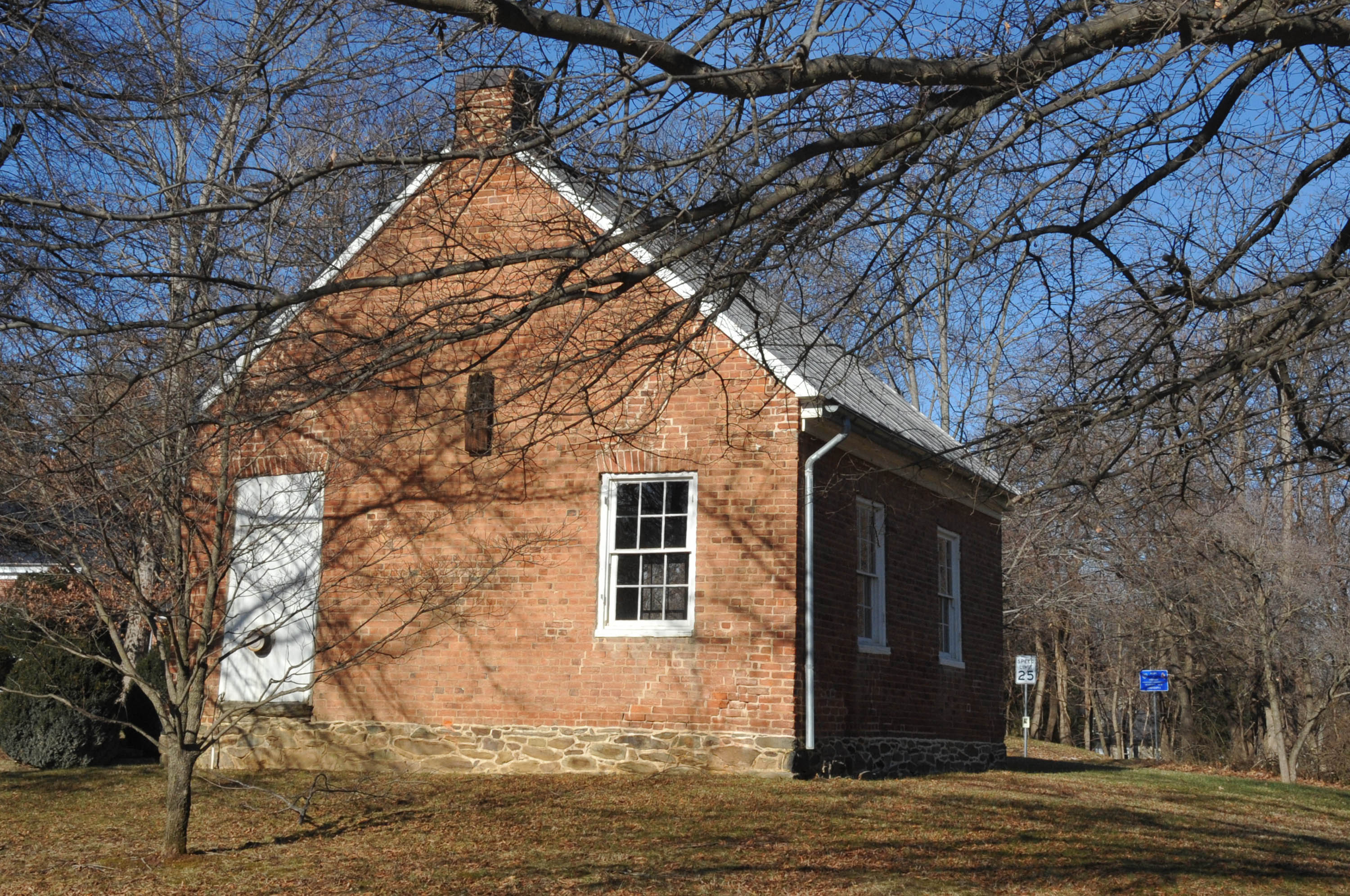

- Location within Northern Virginia Location within Virginia Location within the United States
- Location: Roughly bounded by Purcellville, Virginia 611, 728, 797, 622, 704, and 709, Lincoln, Virginia
- Coordinates: 39°07′00″N 77°41′00″W
- Area: 865 acres (350 ha)
- NRHP reference No.: 82001822
- VLR No.: 053-0002

Significant dates
- Added to NRHP: November 14, 1982
- Designated VLR: July 21, 1981

The Goose Creek Historic District is a rural landscape in the Goose Creek valley of Loudoun County, Virginia. The district covers about 10,000 acres (4,000 ha) south of Hamilton and Purcellville and includes the village of Lincoln. The majority of the district is farmland, with areas of forest along Hogback Mountain. The area was settled by Quakers in the mid-18th century, represented by simple houses and the Goose Creek Meetinghouse Complex in Lincoln, separately listed on the National Register of Historic Places. About 270 buildings lie within the district. The district includes 44 stone buildings, reflecting the popularity of this material in the 18th and 19th centuries in this area. Many houses have outbuildings and barns built in a manner complementary to the dwellings. By the mid-19th century, materials turned to brick, with the Glebe of Shelburne Parish an NRHP-listed example of a brick Federal-style house, as well as the Israel Janney House.

The Goose Creek Historic District was placed on the National Register of Historic Places on November 14, 1982.
