= Valley campaigns of 1864 =

American Civil War operations and battles

Shenandoah Valley campaigns of 1864
- Part of the American Civil War
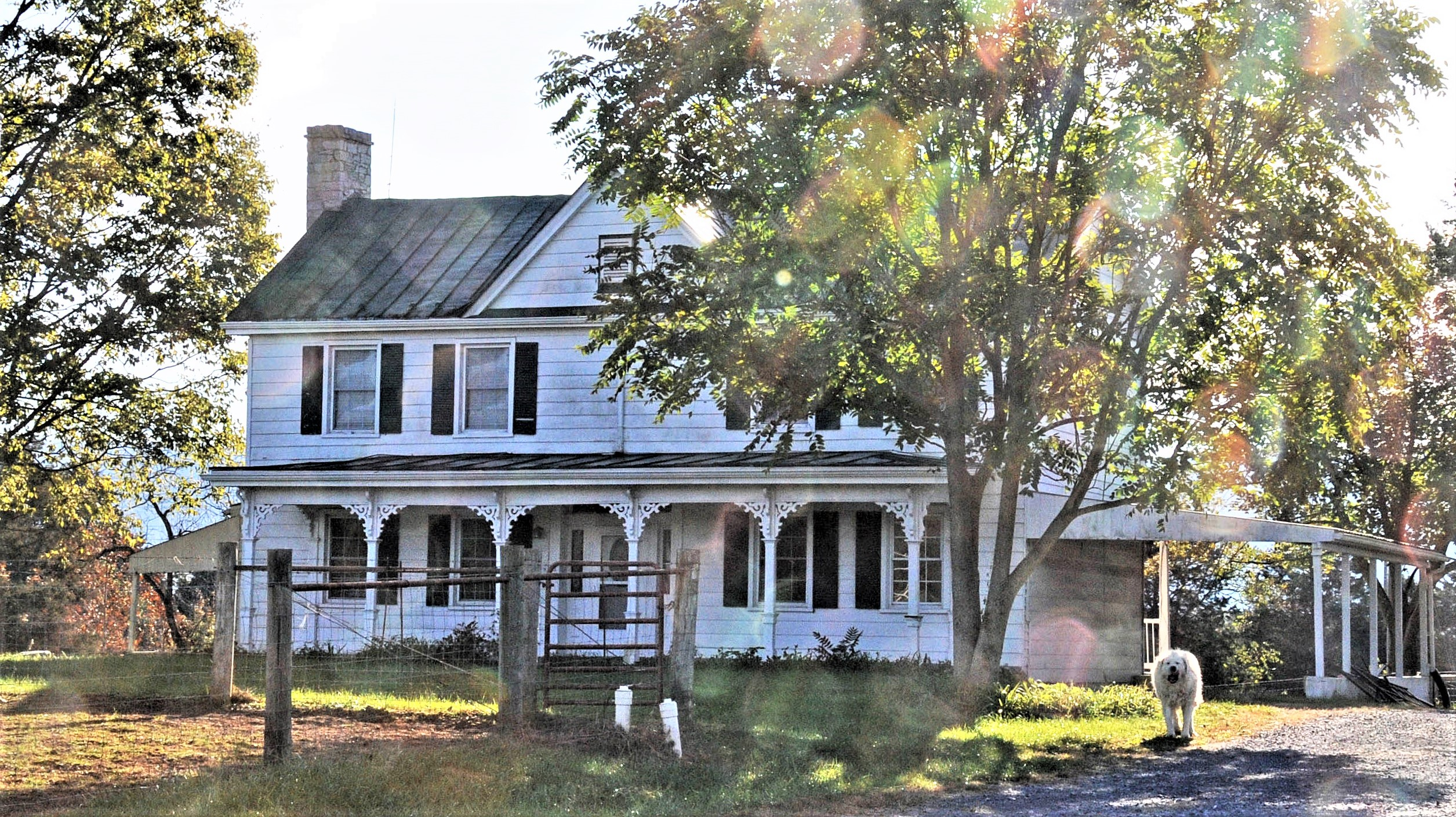
- Funkhoser House and Farm, Toms Brook, Shenandoah County, Virginia
Date	May–October 1864
Location	Shenandoah Valley, Virginia
Result	United States victory

Belligerents
United States of America	Confederate States of America

Commanders and leaders
Franz Sigel; David Hunter; Lew Wallace; George Crook; Philip Sheridan	John C. Breckinridge; Jubal A. Early

Units involved
Department of West Virginia (June 1864); VIII Corps (detachment) & VI Corps (detachment; June–July 1864); Defenses of the Potomac River & Washington (Mid July – August 1, 1864); Army of West Virginia; Army of the Shenandoah (August 1, 1864 – June 27, 1865)	Department of Western Virginia; Army of the Valley

Strength
8,500 (June 1864); 5,800 (early July 1864); 9,600 (mid-July 1864); 40,000 (August–October 1864)	5,000 (June 1864); 14,000 (June–July); 21,100 (October 1864)

Casualties and losses
18,400	17,300

The Valley campaigns of 1864 began as operations initiated by Union Lieutenant General Ulysses S. Grant and resulting battles that took place in the Shenandoah Valley of Virginia during the American Civil War from May to October 1864. Some military historians divide this period into three separate campaigns. This article considers them together, as the campaigns interacted and built upon one another.

== Background ==
As 1864 began, Ulysses S. Grant was promoted to lieutenant general and given command of all Union armies. He chose to make his headquarters with the Army of the Potomac, although Maj. Gen. George G. Meade remained the commander of that army. Grant kept Maj. Gen. William Tecumseh Sherman in command of most of the Western armies. Grant understood the concept of total war and believed, as did Sherman and President Abraham Lincoln, that only the utter defeat of Confederate forces and their economic base would bring the Civil War to an end. He determined to use scorched earth tactics in some important theaters.

Grant devised a coordinated strategy that would strike at the heart of the Confederacy from multiple directions: he would join with Meade and Maj. Gen. Benjamin Butler to fight against Robert E. Lee's Army of Northern Virginia near Richmond; Maj. Gen. Franz Sigel would invade the Shenandoah Valley and destroy Lee's supply lines; Maj. Gen. Sherman would attack Joseph E. Johnston's Army of Tennessee, invade Georgia and capture Atlanta; and finally Maj. Gen. Nathaniel P. Banks was assigned to capture Mobile, Alabama, an important port on the Gulf Coast.

== Lynchburg campaign (May–June 1864) ==
Shenandoah Valley operations, May–July 1864

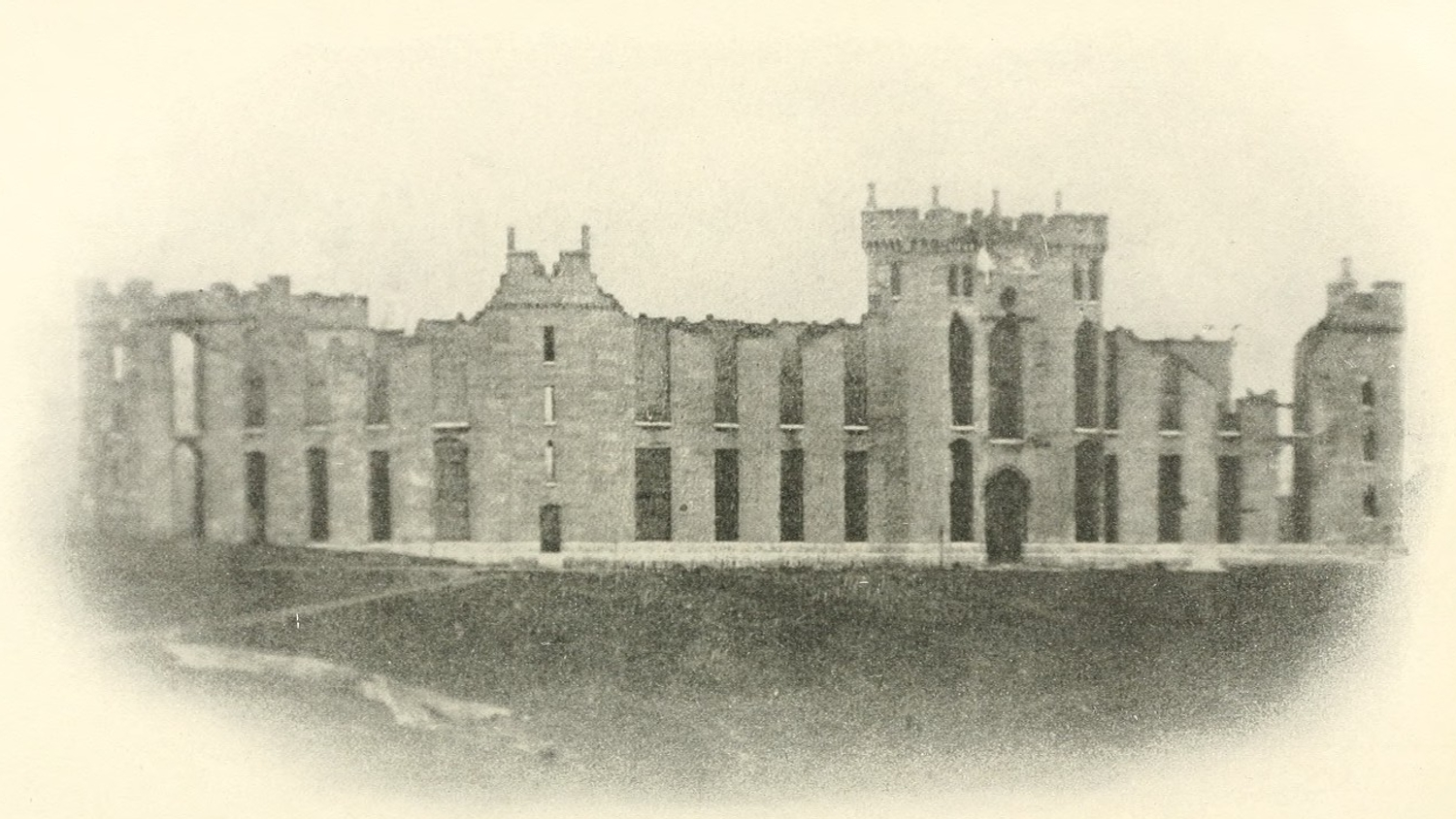
The ruins of the Virginia Military Institute after Hunter's Raid in 1864.

The first campaign started with Grant's planned invasion of the Shenandoah Valley from the Department of West Virginia, which Gen. Sigel commanded. West Virginia had been created by the Federal government as a Union state in 1863, but many of the Confederate troops defending the Valley had been recruited in the new state. Grant ordered Sigel to move "up the Valley" (i.e., southwest to the higher elevations) with 10,000 men to destroy the railroad and canal complex at Lynchburg, Virginia.

=== New Market (May 15) ===
Sigel was intercepted and defeated by 4,000 troops and cadets from the Virginia Military Institute under Confederate Maj. Gen. John C. Breckinridge. His forces retreated to Strasburg, Virginia. Maj. Gen. David Hunter replaced Sigel. As discussed below he initiated another strike to the south, eventually burning VMI in retaliation for the Jones-Imboden Raid as well as subsequent actions of VMI cadets.

=== Piedmont (June 5–6) ===
Hunter resumed the Union offensive and defeated William E. "Grumble" Jones at the Battle of the Piedmont. Jones died in the battle, and Hunter occupied Staunton, Virginia.

On June 11 Hunter, who had continued to strike southward, fought at Lexington against John McCausland's Confederate cavalry, which retreated to the mountains around Buchanan. Hunter ordered Col. Alfred N. Duffié's cavalry division to join him in Lexington. While awaiting their arrival, Union forces burned former Governor John Letcher's home, in addition to shelling and burning the Virginia Military Institute. They seized the statue of George Washington, and nearly destroyed the campus. (VMI moved its classes to the Richmond Alms House).

Joined by Duffié on June 13, Hunter sent Averell to drive McCausland out of Buchanan and capture the James River bridge. But McCausland burned the bridge and fled. Hunter joined General William Averell in Buchanan on June 14 and on June 15 advanced via the road between the Peaks of Otter to occupy Liberty that evening. Meanwhile, Confederate Maj. Gen. John C. Breckinridge sent Brig. Gen. John D. Imboden and his cavalry to join McCausland. Breckinridge arrived in Lynchburg the next day. Maj. Gen. Daniel Harvey Hill and Brig. Gen. Harry T. Hays constructed a defense line in the hills just southwest of the city. When McCausland fell back, Averell's cavalry pursued, engaging in the afternoon Skirmish at New London Academy. Union forces launched another attack on McCausland and Imboden that evening, and the Confederates retreated from New London.

=== Lynchburg (June 17–18) ===
Confederate Gen. Jubal A. Early and his troops arrived in Lynchburg on June 17 at 1 p.m. Although Hunter had planned to destroy railroads and hospitals in Lynchburg, and the James River Canal, when Early's initial units arrived, Hunter thought his forces outnumbered. Hunter, short on supplies, retreated back through West Virginia.

== Early's Invasion of the North and operations against the B&O Railroad (June–August 1864) ==
Commanding General Robert E. Lee was concerned about Hunter's advances in the Valley, which threatened critical railroad lines and provisions for the Virginia-based Confederate forces. He sent Jubal Early's corps to sweep Union forces from the Valley and, if possible, to menace Washington, D.C., hoping to compel Grant to dilute his forces against Lee around Petersburg, Virginia. Early was operating in the same area where Confederate Thomas J. "Stonewall" Jackson had conducted his successful 1862 Valley campaign. Early got off to a good start. He drove downriver through the Valley without opposition, bypassed Harpers Ferry, crossed the Potomac River, and advanced into Maryland. Grant dispatched a corps under Horatio G. Wright and other troops under George Crook to reinforce Washington and pursue Early.

=== Monocacy (July 9) ===
Early defeated a smaller force under Lew Wallace near Frederick, Maryland. This battle delayed his progress enough to allow the Union time to reinforce the defenses of Washington.

=== Fort Stevens (July 11–12) ===
Early attacked a fort on the northwest defensive perimeter of Washington without success and withdrew across the Potomac to Virginia.

=== Heaton's Crossroads (July 16) ===
Union cavalry attacked Early's supply trains at Purcellville as the Confederates withdrew across the Loudoun Valley toward the Blue Ridge Mountains. Several small cavalry skirmishes occurred throughout the day as the Federals attempted to harass Early's column.

=== Cool Spring (July 17–18) ===
Also known as Snicker's Ferry

Early attacked and repulsed pursuing Union forces under Wright.

=== Rutherford's Farm (July 20) ===
A Union division attacked a Confederate division under Stephen Dodson Ramseur and routed it. Early withdrew his army south to Fisher's Hill, near Strasburg, Virginia.

=== Second Kernstown (July 24) ===
Wright withdrew, thinking Early was no longer a threat. Early attacked the troops Wright had left at Winchester under Crook to prevent or delay their return to Grant's forces besieging Petersburg. Union troops were routed, streaming through the streets of Winchester. Early pursued and ordered the burning of Chambersburg, Pennsylvania, in part in retaliation for Hunter's previous destruction in the Valley.

=== Folck's Mill (August 1) ===
Also known as the Battle of Cumberland

An inconclusive small cavalry battle in Maryland.

=== Moorefield (August 7) ===
Also known as the Battle of Oldfields

Confederate cavalry returning from the Chambersburg burning were surprised in the early morning and defeated by Union cavalry.

== Sheridan's Shenandoah Valley campaign (August–October 1864) ==
Shenandoah Valley operations, August–October 1864

Grant finally lost patience with Hunter, particularly his allowing Early to burn Chambersburg, and knew that Washington remained vulnerable if Early was still on the loose. He found a new commander aggressive enough to defeat Early: Philip Sheridan, the cavalry commander of the Army of the Potomac, who was given command of all forces in the area, calling them the Army of the Shenandoah. Sheridan initially started slowly, primarily because the impending presidential election of 1864 demanded a cautious approach, avoiding any disaster that might lead to the defeat of Abraham Lincoln.

=== Guard Hill (August 16) ===
Also known as Front Royal or Cedarville

Confederate forces under Richard H. Anderson were sent from Petersburg to reinforce Early. Brig. Gen. Wesley Merritt's Union cavalry division surprised the Confederate columns while they were crossing the Shenandoah River, capturing about 300. The Confederates rallied and advanced, gradually pushing back Merritt's men to Cedarville. The battle was inconclusive.

=== Summit Point (August 21) ===
Also known as Flowing Springs or Cameron's Depot

Early and Anderson struck Sheridan near Charles Town, West Virginia. Sheridan conducted a fighting withdrawal.

=== Smithfield Crossing (August 25–29) ===
Two Confederate divisions crossed Opequon Creek and forced a Union cavalry division back to Charles Town; a Union infantry division was brought up to stop the Confederate advance.

=== Berryville (September 3–4) ===
A minor engagement in which Early attempted to stop Sheridan's march up the Valley. Early withdrew to Opequon Creek when he realized he was in a poor position for attacking Sheridan's full force.

=== Third Winchester (September 19) ===
Also known as the Battle of Opequon

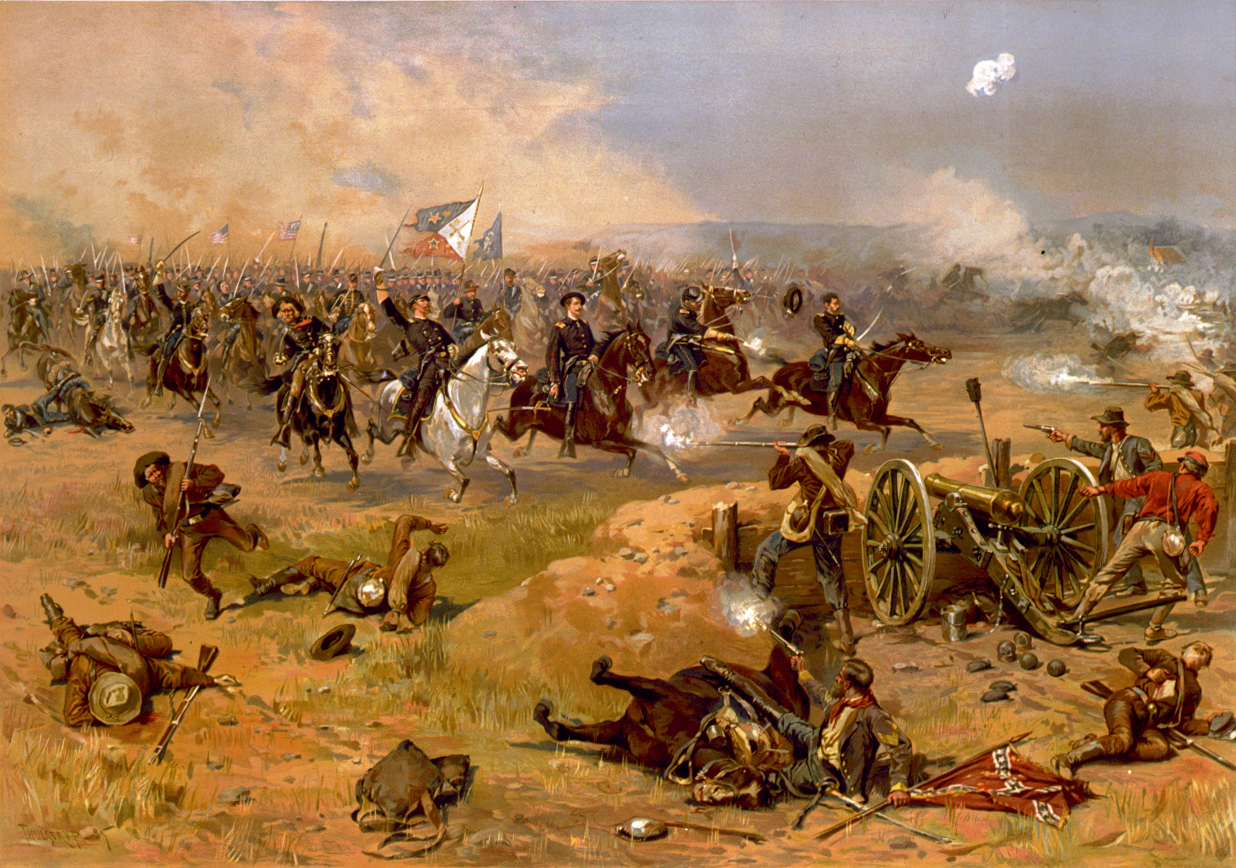
Sheridan's final charge at Winchester

After learning from Quaker Unionist Rebecca Wright that Early had dispersed his forces to raid the B&O Railroad and had removed infantry and artillery from nearby Winchester, Virginia (an important town and transportation center that changed hands over 70 times in the war), Sheridan attacked Early's camp at Opequon Creek just outside the town. Sustaining ruinous casualties, Early retreated from what was the largest battle in all three of the Valley campaigns, taking up defensive positions at Fisher's Hill.

=== Fisher's Hill (September 21–22) ===
Sheridan hit Early in an afternoon flanking attack, routing the Confederates with moderate losses. Early retreated to Waynesboro, Virginia.

With Early damaged and pinned down, the Valley lay open to the Union. And because of Sherman's capture of Atlanta, Lincoln's re-election now seemed assured. Sheridan moved slowly down the Valley, conducting a scorched earth campaign that would presage Sherman's March to the Sea in November. The goal was to deny the Confederacy the means of feeding and supplying its armies in Virginia, and Sheridan's army ruthlessly burned crops, barns, mills, and factories.

=== Tom's Brook (October 9) ===
As Early began a pursuit of Sheridan, Union cavalry routed two divisions of Confederate cavalry.

=== Cedar Creek (October 19) ===
In a surprise attack, Early smashed two-thirds of the Union army, but his troops were hungry and exhausted and fell out of their ranks to pillage the Union camp. Sheridan, in a ride from Winchester, managed to rally his troops and utterly rout Early's men, and the Confederates lost everything they had gained in the morning. This victory helped Lincoln get re-elected.

== Aftermath ==
After his missions of neutralizing Early and suppressing the Valley's military-related economy, Sheridan returned to assist Grant at Petersburg. Most of the men of Early's corps rejoined Lee at Petersburg in December, while Early remained in the Valley to command a skeleton force. He was defeated at the Battle of Waynesboro on March 2, 1865, after which Lee removed him from his command because the Confederate government and people had lost confidence in him.

== See also ==
- Field of Lost Shoes
