= Samuel M. Janney =

Influential American Abolitionist (1801 – 1880)

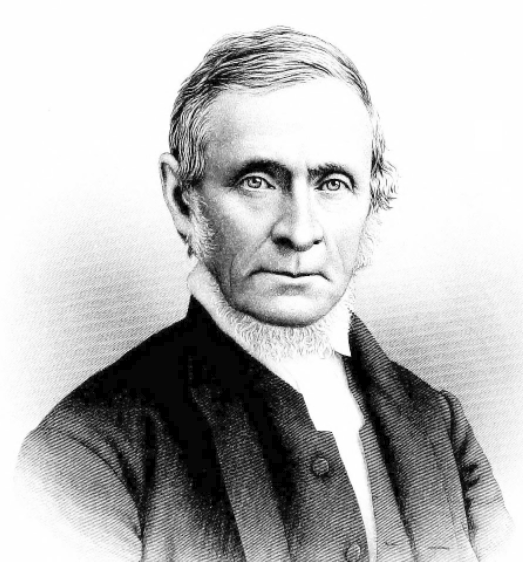
- Church: Religious Society of Friends (Quakers)

Personal details
- Born: January 11, 1801 Loudoun County, Virginia
- Died: April 30, 1880 (aged 79) Lincoln, Virginia
- Buried: Goose Creek Meetinghouse Complex
- Denomination: Quaker
- Parents: Abijah Janney and Jane McPherson
- Spouse: Elizabeth Hopkins Janney
- Children: 8
- Profession: educator, author, abolitionist

Samuel McPherson Janney (January 11, 1801 – April 30, 1880) was an American Quaker minister, educator and author. An influential advocate for the abolition of slavery, Janney became known for improving education for women in his native Virginia, as well as for African Americans and Native Americans. He was a relative of philanthropist Johns Hopkins.

== Early and family life ==
Samuel McPherson Janney was born on January 11, 1801, in Loudoun County, Virginia, the eldest child of Abijah Janney and his first wife, the former Jane McPherson, both members of the Religious Society of Friends (Quakers). He was descended from Thomas Janney (1633-1697), a Quaker minister who had spread his faith from his native Cheshire in England around that country and Ireland before emigrating across the Atlantic Ocean with his wife, four sons and two servants in 1683. They settled in Bucks County, Pennsylvania, near where some of his wife's relatives had already settled. That Thomas Janney became a member of the Provincial Council for Pennsylvania, as well as a local justice of the peace, although he died on a trip to England. His grandson, Abel Janney (son of his son, another Thomas Janney) had moved to Virginia with his wife, and established the Fairfax Monthly Meeting, which would later establish monthly meetings in Alexandria Virginia as well as Goose Creek in Loudoun County. Other Janneys arrived in Virginia from Pennsylvania (including descendants of Abel's brother Joseph, who was a great-great-grandfather of this boy), as well as from England. His distant cousin John Janney, also descended from Thomas Janney's son Joseph and grandson Jacob, would hold many important offices in Loudoun County, as well as chaired the 1861 Virginia Secession Convention. Thirty different people with the Janney surname appear as heads of households in Loudoun County in the 1820s, 1830s and 1840s.

After his mother's death, Janney's father sold his Loudoun farm, as well as remarried and moved to nearby Fairfax County, where he and two partners built a mill about four miles west of Alexandria. At age 14, Samuel Janney left school to work for his uncle Phineas Janney, a merchant in Alexandria. He lived with his uncle's family, but had time to continue his education, including night classes at a school run by Benjamin Hallowell. Janney also appreciated the Alexandria Friend's meeting led by Edward Stabler and Dr. Elisha C. Dick, and his good friend was William Lamphier, a Methodist preacher.

On November 12, 1823, at the age of 22, Janney married his (third) cousin, Elizabeth Hopkins Janney, at Goose Creek Meeting House in Lincoln, Virginia. They would have eight children together.

== Career ==
Janney initially was trained as a merchant in Alexandria, and in 1829 he established a partnership with is brother in law Samuel H. Janney to operate a cotton factory in Occoquan in Prince William County sixteen miles south of Alexandria. However, he developed a troublesome cough, and fearing tuberculosis, as well as having published a volume of poems that previously appeared in the New-York Mirror, gave up that mercantile career around 1839 and moved back to Loudoun County.

Janney then devoted his life to his religion, education and social reform. During his commercial career, he had helped establish a Quaker meeting near Occoquan, as well as traveled to meetings in Maryland, in Bedford, Pennsylvania and the New York Yearly Meeting. In 1839, Janney founded Springdale Boarding School for Girls in Loudoun County. The school emphasized education and intellectual growth in the Quaker tradition. Janney also traveled to various Quaker meetings in Virginia. He joined the Loudoun meeting of the American Colonization Society, and also petitioned Congress for the abolition of slavery in the District of Columbia. Janney continued to write and published theological works and histories, including The Life of William Penn (1851) and History of the Religious Society of Friends from Its Rise to the Year 1828 (1860).

A prominent abolitionist, Janney condemned slavery in his writings, arguing that it was morally and socially unjust. He first began writing against slavery in the Alexandria Gazette in 1827. In 1849, Janney wrote three anti-slavery essays in rebuttal to Methodist Reverend William A. Smith's pro-slavery speech. However, he soon found himself jailed in Loudoun County. After a trial lasting several months, Janney was freed of all charges. He continued to support gradual emancipation and efforts to improve the lives of freed African Americans.

The Civil War began while Janney was in Philadelphia attending to publication of his "History of the Friends." He traveled through the opposing armies in order to return home, and then again to attend the Baltimore Yearly Meeting. When he returned, he was arrested but released after four days' detention, and later visited another subordinate meeting of the Baltimore Yearly Meeting, as well as the New York Yearly Meeting. Janney also traveled to Washington D.C. to negotiate the release of Loudoun people imprisoned for Confederate sympathies.

After the conflict, former General, now President Ulysses S. Grant asked the Baltimore Yearly Meeting to take charge of some Native Americans in the west. They accepted the charge and Grant appointed Janney as Superintendent of Indian Affairs in Omaha, Nebraska. From 1869 until his 1871 resignation citing health concerns, Janney distributed rations, established schools to teach farming and domestic skills and promoted peaceful relations for approximately 6000 Native Americans (many of them Pawnee) under his care.

== Death and legacy ==
Samuel M. Janney died on April 30, 1880, in Lincoln, Virginia, at the age of 79. He was buried in the Friends Burial Ground at Goose Creek Meeting House.
