= William Averell (disambiguation) =

William Averell (1556–1605) was an English pamphleteer.

William Averell may also refer to:

- William D. Averell (1853–1928), conchologist and editor of The Nautilus
- William W. Averell (1832–1900), Union general in the American Civil War

== See also ==
- William Averell Harriman (1891–1986), American politician, businessman, and diplomat
