= Cameron Parish, Virginia =

Former ecclesiastical organization of the Anglican church in colonial Virginia

Cameron Parish was the ecclesiastical jurisdiction of the Anglican church in colonial Virginia with jurisdiction over the western part of Fairfax County and, once it was created in 1757, over Loudoun County. The parish was named for the minor title of Thomas, Lord Fairfax, Baron of Cameron. The parish was created in 1748 from Truro Parish. It was divided in 1770 and Shelburne Parish was formed from the western half of Loudoun County. After 1770, Cameron Parish covered eastern Loudoun County until disestablishment ended the parish system by 1786.

== The parish in colonial Virginia ==
The Anglican church was the established religion of the Colony of Virginia from 1619 - 1776. Each parish in the colony was ministered to by a single minister and governed by a vestry usually composed of 12 local men of wealth and standing in the community. Parishes were created by acts of the House of Burgesses and the upper house of the legislature, the Governor's Council.

== Formation of the parish ==
Cameron Parish was created by the General Assembly of Virginia in 1748 when Truro Parish was divided along Difficult Run. It included what is, at present, Loudoun County and the western part of Fairfax County. The parish was named for Thomas, Lord Fairfax, who was also 6th Baron Cameron. He was the lord proprietor of much of Northern Virginia during the colonial period, which he inherited through his mother's line, the Culpepers.

In 1763, the parish boundaries were adjusted to include all of Loudoun County, as it was then configured. In 1770, Shelburne Parish was created out of the western part of Cameron Parish. Thus, Cameron Parish's boundaries included the Potomac River on the north, Bull Run on the south, Goose Creek to the west, and the Fairfax County line in the east.

== Places of worship ==
The oldest chapel built in what would become Cameron Parish was originally a "Chapel of Ease for the comfort of the people above the Goose Creek," built in 1733 by the vestry of Truro Parish. It was a log structure near the Big Spring about two miles north of present-day Leesburg.

Other churches built were all also wooden structures and included Rocky Run Chapel, Broad Run Church, and Mountain Chapel. In 1773, the Sugarland Run Church, a brick structure, was built on a site in present-day Sterling.

== Clergy ==
- Rev. John Andrews (1758–67)
- Rev. Archibald Avens (1767–71)
- Rev. Spence Monroe Grayson (1773–76)

== See also ==
Episcopal Diocese of Virginia:History
