= Rebecca Wright Bonsal =

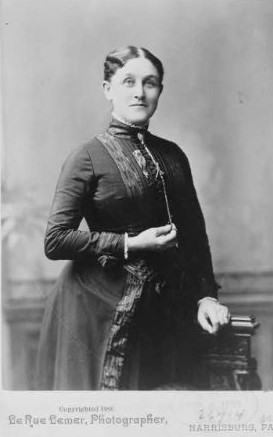
- Bonsal in 1889
- Born: January 31, 1838; Maryland, US
- Died: May 15, 1914 (aged 76); Washington, D.C., US
- Occupation: Teacher
- Known for: Union spy, federal bureaucrat
- Spouse: William Bonsal

Rebecca McPherson Wright Bonsal (January 31, 1838 or 1842 – May 15, 1914) was an American Quaker teacher who was fired for her Unionist loyalty. She delivered important intelligence to the Union Army during the American Civil War, which helped Union Generals Philip Sheridan and George Crook defeat Confederate General Jubal Early in the crucial Third Battle of Winchester in September, 1864.

However, the retaliation she feared from Confederate sympathizers in Winchester (the seat of Frederick County at the northern end of the Shenandoah Valley), proved well-founded. After Wright wore a brooch given to her by General Sheridan in early 1867, her Confederate-sympathizing sister told a reporter its provenance. The resulting newspaper article led to social ostracism of Rebecca Wright and a boycott of the boarding house her mother ran with her daughters' help, and forced them to move to Philadelphia, Pennsylvania. Denied a soldier's pension because of her sex despite the efforts of Congressman Thaddeus Stevens and General Sheridan, eventually Wright accepted a clerical job at the U.S. Treasury Department and moved to Washington, D.C., where she married a Union veteran, and worked until shortly before her death.

== Early life ==
Rebecca Wright was the oldest surviving child of furniture manufacturer Amos Wright (1802-1864) and his wife Rachel (1810-1874). The Wright family were members of the Hopewell Meeting (a/k/a "Opequon Meeting") and thus did not own slaves. Young Rebecca was educated in Winchester, as well as for a year at the Friends School in nearby Loudoun County run by Samuel Janney. During the 1850 federal census, the family included three younger brothers and a young sister, By 1860, the older boys (subject to conscription) no longer resided with them. The Wright household in 1860 only included Amos, his wife, daughters, son John (aged 9) and a domestic servant, as well as two other families (a coachmaker, his wife and infant son, and a hatter, his wife and teen-aged daughter).

== American Civil War ==
Rebecca Wright began teaching children when she was 15 years old, and during the three years before the American Civil War taught at the Hopewell Meeting's school, as well as assisted at Powell's Academy (a private school). Winchester changed hands 75 times in the four wartime years, including as a result of three major battles which occurred nearby. However, most townspeople sympathized with the Confederacy. In March 1862, Confederate troops arrested her father Amos (a leading Union sympathizer, as well as secession opponent the previous year) and brought him into town, along with Smith Gilkeson and Jason Rea, and some feared they would be lynched. Amos Wright may have died in a Confederate prison in 1864. His wife and daughters lived on Fort Hill in Winchester; Hannah Wright had Confederate sympathies.

On September 16, 1864, General Sheridan sent Tom Laws, an elderly black slave from Millwood, Virginia who had a Confederate permit to sell produce in Winchester three days a week, to contact the fired schoolteacher at her Winchester home. She conveyed information about General Early's forces which a Confederate officer had publicly bragged about the previous day, namely that Confederate infantry and artillery battalions had left town.

Acting on that information, Sheridan engaged Early's forces near Opequon Creek in which proved to be the second bloodiest battle in the Shenandoah Valley. By the sunset on September 19, 1864, Early's army had been routed: of 14,500 Confederate troops, 2,000 had been killed or wounded, 1800 men were missing and three important brigade commanders had been killed (General Robert E. Rodes, Colonels Archibald C. Godwin, George S. Patton Sr. and John H. S. Funk). Union forces suffered over 5,000 casualties, but those 40,000 troops could only fail to account for 500 men. Generals Sheridan and Crook attempted to thank Wright for her assistance after the victory, but she urged confidentiality, fearing retaliation. General Sheridan would pursue Early's retreating army, and again defeat it at Fisher's Hill on September 22, and yet again, even more bloodily, at the Battle of Cedar Creek on October 19. By mid-November the Winchester and Potomac Railroad had resumed service from Harper's Ferry to Stephenson's Depot, allowing the Federals a secure supply line, and Winchester had become the Union army's winter quarters would not again change hands.

== Later life ==
In 1867, Sheridan learned of the Wright ladies' financial distress and sent Rebecca Wright a pocket watch and elegant brooch, as well as a recommendation from General Ulysses S. Grant for a position in the U.S. Treasury Department in Washington, D.C. However, after Rebecca wore the brooch, a boarder who was a reporter for the Baltimore Sun, asked her sister Hanna about its source, and the Winchester Star published the story on February 20, 1867. Neighbors then boycotted the Wrights' boarding house and boys spat at Rebecca in the street, so the Wright women moved to Philadelphia, Pennsylvania. Congressman Thaddeus Stevens proposed a special bill to allow Wright a federal pension, but failed to secure its passage, other members objecting on account of her sex. Rebecca Wright eventually accepted the job offer, moved to Washington, D.C. the following July, and remained a federal civil servant for 47 years. She married William Bonsal, a veteran of the 16th Pennsylvania Cavalry in 1871, and financed his purchase of a farm in Kansas, but successive poor crops led him to return to Washington, D.C.

== Death and legacy ==
Rebecca Wright Bonsal retired from her federal job shortly before her death in 1914. Winchester and surrounding counties have recently erected monuments explaining her wartime service, and that of Thomas Laws.
