= Sara Haines Smith Hoge =

American temperance advocate, leader (1864–1939)

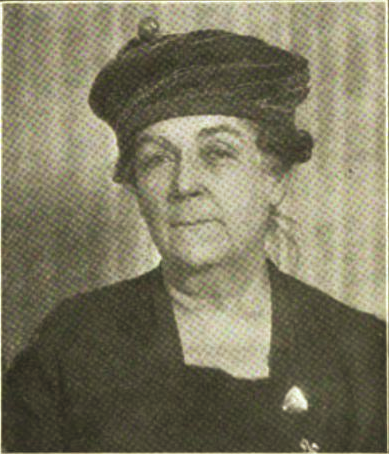
- Portrait from Standard Encyclopedia of the Alcohol Problem (1926)
- Born: Sara Haines Smith; March 22, 1864; Lincoln, Virginia, U.S.
- Died: November 29, 1939 (aged 75); Takoma Park, Maryland, U.S.
- Other name: Mrs. Howard M. Hoge
- Education: Swarthmore College
- Occupations: President, Virginia Woman's Christian Temperance Union
- Spouse: Howard M. Hoge (m. 1886)

Sara Haines Smith Hoge (née, Smith; known in print media after marriage as Mrs. Howard M. Hoge; 1864-1939) was an American temperance advocate. For 40 years, she served as President of the Virginia Woman's Christian Temperance Union (WCTU).

== Early life and education ==
Sara (or Sarah) Haines Smith was born near Lincoln, Virginia, March 22, 1864.

She was educated in the local schools and at Darlington Seminary, West Chester, Pennsylvania, and Swarthmore College, at Swarthmore, Pennsylvania.

== Career ==
She taught for four years.

Hoge joined the WCTU in 1887, on its first organization in Virginia, and was made recording secretary and, later, president of the Lincoln branch. A few years later she was sent as a delegate to the State WCTU convention, where she was elected recording secretary of the Virginia WCTU, serving until 1898, when she was elected State president of that body. She has been annually reelected to that position. During her term of service as State recording secretary, she introduced medal-contest work, and was for several years superintendent of that department in connection with her other duties.

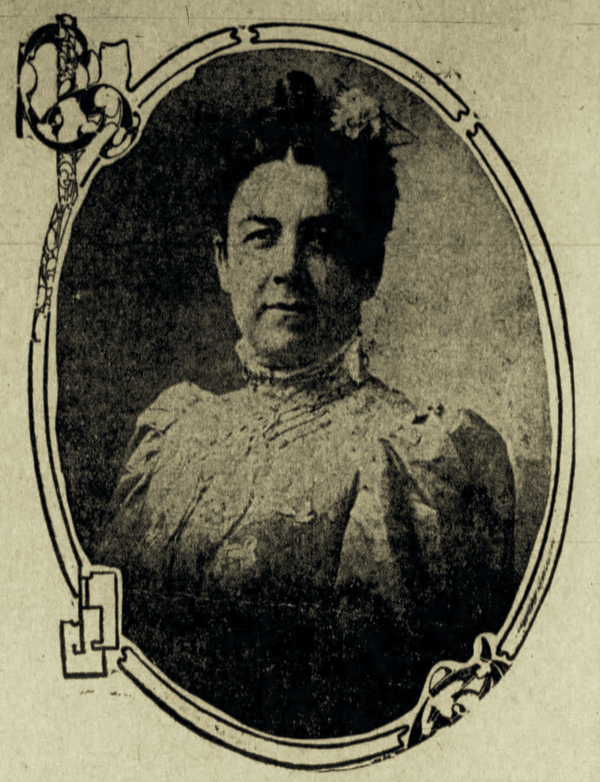
Portrait from The Virginian-Pilot (1910)

The membership of the WCTU greatly increased during Hoge’s term of office as State President, and its efficiency was strikingly manifested in the successful campaign for a dry Virginia in September, 1914. In 1906, in addition to her responsible duties as State president, Hoge was elected assistant recording secretary of the National WCTU, and has been retained in that position ever since.

She was a member of the Woman's National Democratic Law enforcement League, Citizens Committee of One Thousand, National Temperance Council, and the Home Interest Club.

== Personal life ==
In 1886, she married Rev. Howard M. Hoge, a minister of the Friends’ Church at Lincoln, and with him took up her residence near the place of her birth. He was a minister and horticulturist. He was President, Virginia State Horticultural Society; President, Loudoun County Community Association; President, Loudoun County Fruit Growers' Association; and a member of the National Temperance Council.

Sara Haines Smith Hoge died at a sanitarium in Takoma Park, Maryland, November 29, 1939. Burial was at Lincoln Cemetery.
