= Hamilton Masonic Lodge =

Historic building in Virginia, US

- U.S. National Register of Historic Places
- Virginia Landmarks Register
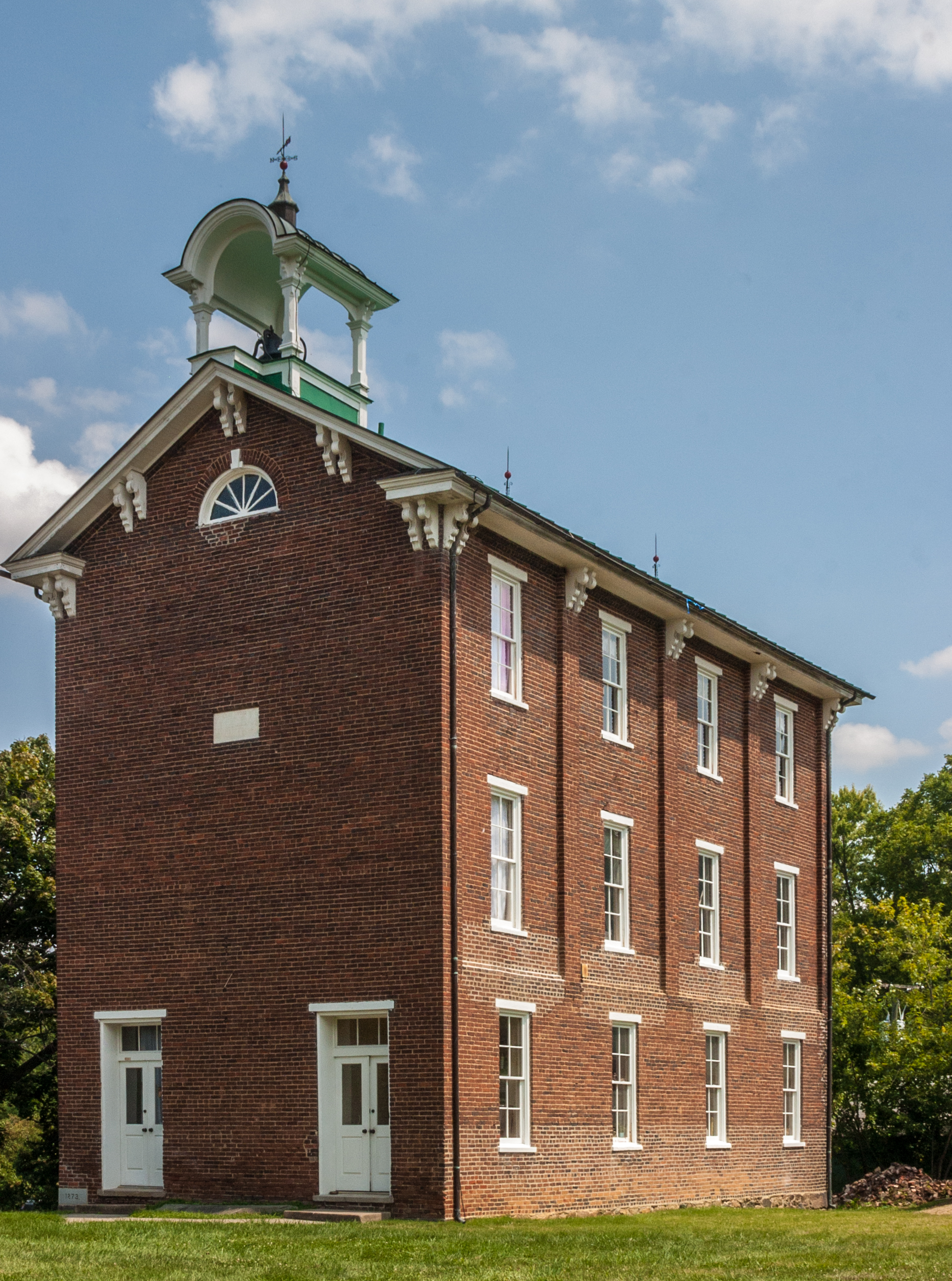
- Hamilton Masonic Lodge, 2013

- Location within Northern Virginia Location within Virginia Location within the United States
- Location: 43 S. Rogers St., Hamilton, Virginia
- Coordinates: 39°8′1″N 77°39′54″W
- Area: less than one acre
- Built: 1873
- Architect: Lamden, John R.; Ruse, Richard
- Architectural style: Italianate
- NRHP reference No.: 99001505
- VLR No.: 232-5005

Significant dates
- Added to NRHP: December 9, 1999
- Designated VLR: September 15, 1999

The Hamilton Masonic Lodge is a historic brick building built in 1873, located in Hamilton, Virginia. Built in the Italianate style, it historically served as a Masonic meeting hall and (until the 1920s) as a school for grades 1−12.

It was listed on the National Register of Historic Places in 1999.

No Masonic lodges meet in the building today, and its original 1873-dated cornerstone was (as of the 1999 NRHP-listing) on display at another Masonic lodge building several miles away.
