= Sunnyside Farm (Hamilton, Virginia) =

Historic house in Virginia, United States

- U.S. National Register of Historic Places
- Virginia Landmarks Register
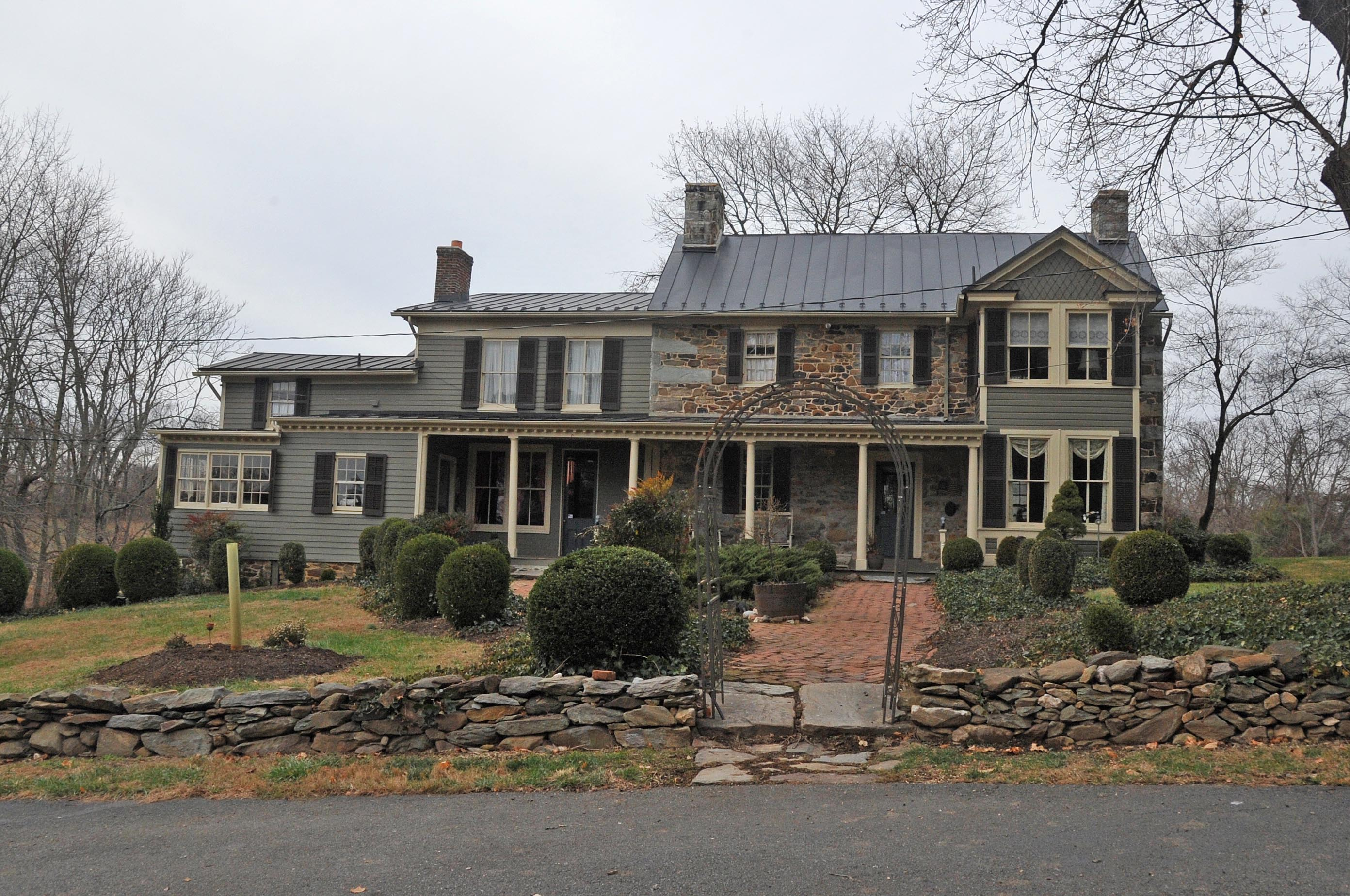

- Location within Northern Virginia Location within Virginia Location within the United States
- Location: South side of VA Business Route 7, 1,150 feet (350 m) east of the junction with VA 287, Hamilton, Virginia
- Coordinates: 39°07′54″N 77°41′15″W
- Area: 35 acres (14 ha)
- Built: c. 1815
- Architectural style: Early Republic
- NRHP reference No.: 94000989
- VLR No.: 053-0304

Significant dates
- Added to NRHP: August 16, 1994
- Designated VLR: June 15, 1994

Sunnyside Farm is a historic home and farm located near Hamilton, Loudoun County, Virginia. The original section of the house was built about 1815, and is a two-story, three-bay, vernacular Federal style dwelling. There are several frame additions built from c. 1855–1860 up through the 20th century. Also on the property are the contributing brick barn with diamond-patterned ventilation holes (c. 1813), two-story springhouse (c. 1813), a wide loafing shed, a large corncrib, and two-car garage (c. 1948).

It was listed on the National Register of Historic Places in 1994.
