= Spring Hill Farm (Hamilton, Virginia) =

Historic house in Virginia, United States

- U.S. National Register of Historic Places
- Virginia Landmarks Register
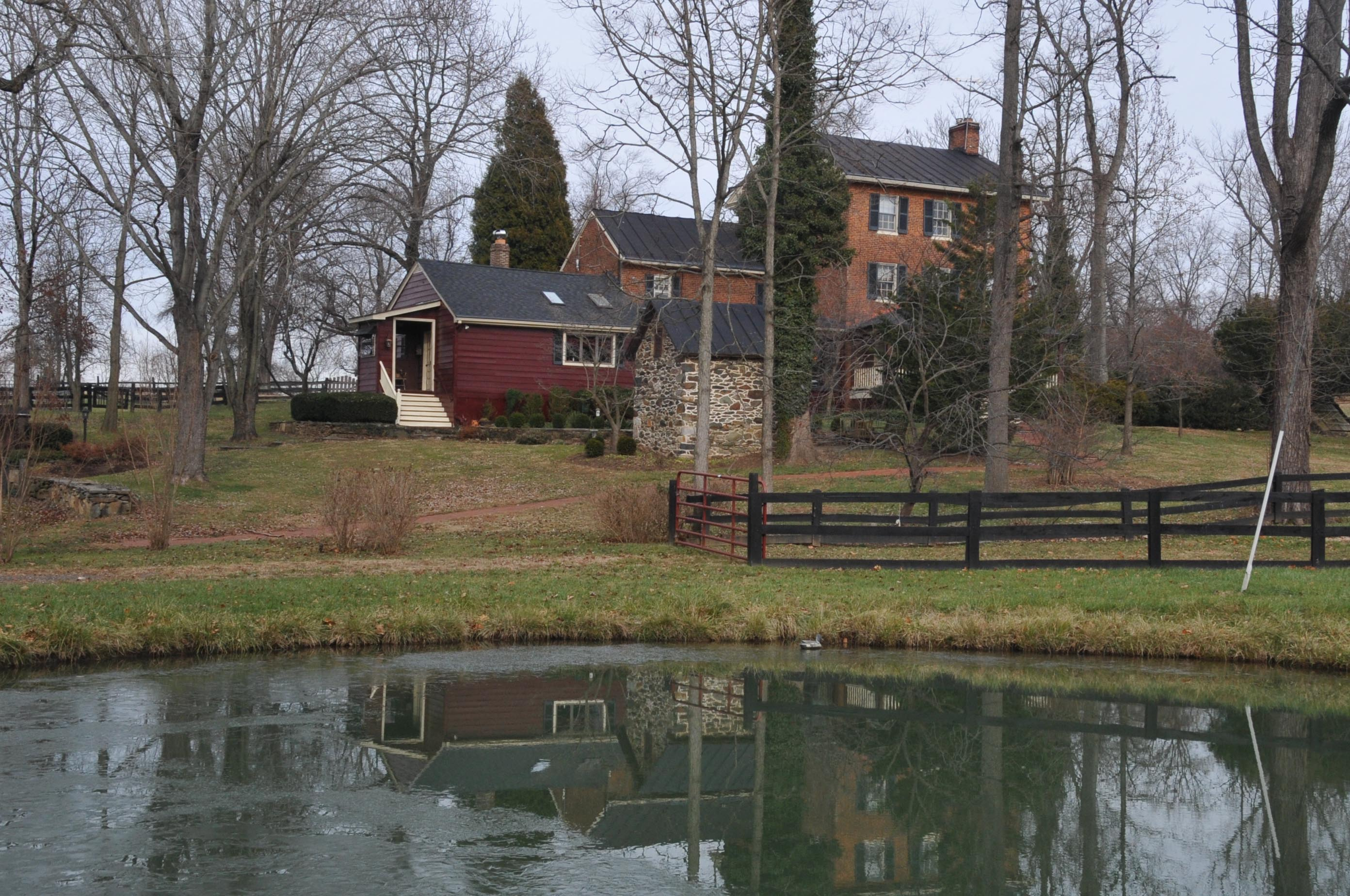

- Location within Northern Virginia Location within Virginia Location within the United States
- Location: 39018 Piggott Bottom Rd., Hamilton, Virginia
- Coordinates: 39°9′21″N 77°38′56″W
- Area: 1.6 acres (0.65 ha)
- Built: 1830
- Architectural style: Early Republic, Greek Revival
- NRHP reference No.: 05000766
- VLR No.: 053-5546

Significant dates
- Added to NRHP: July 27, 2005
- Designated VLR: June 1, 2005

The Spring Hill Farm is a historic farm in Hamilton, Virginia. Dating back to 1830, it was listed on the National Register of Historic Places in 2005. The listing included five contributing buildings.

The main building has a telescope plan design and is built with Flemish bond brickwork.
