= Janney House =

Historic house in Virginia, United States

- U.S. National Register of Historic Places
- Virginia Landmarks Register
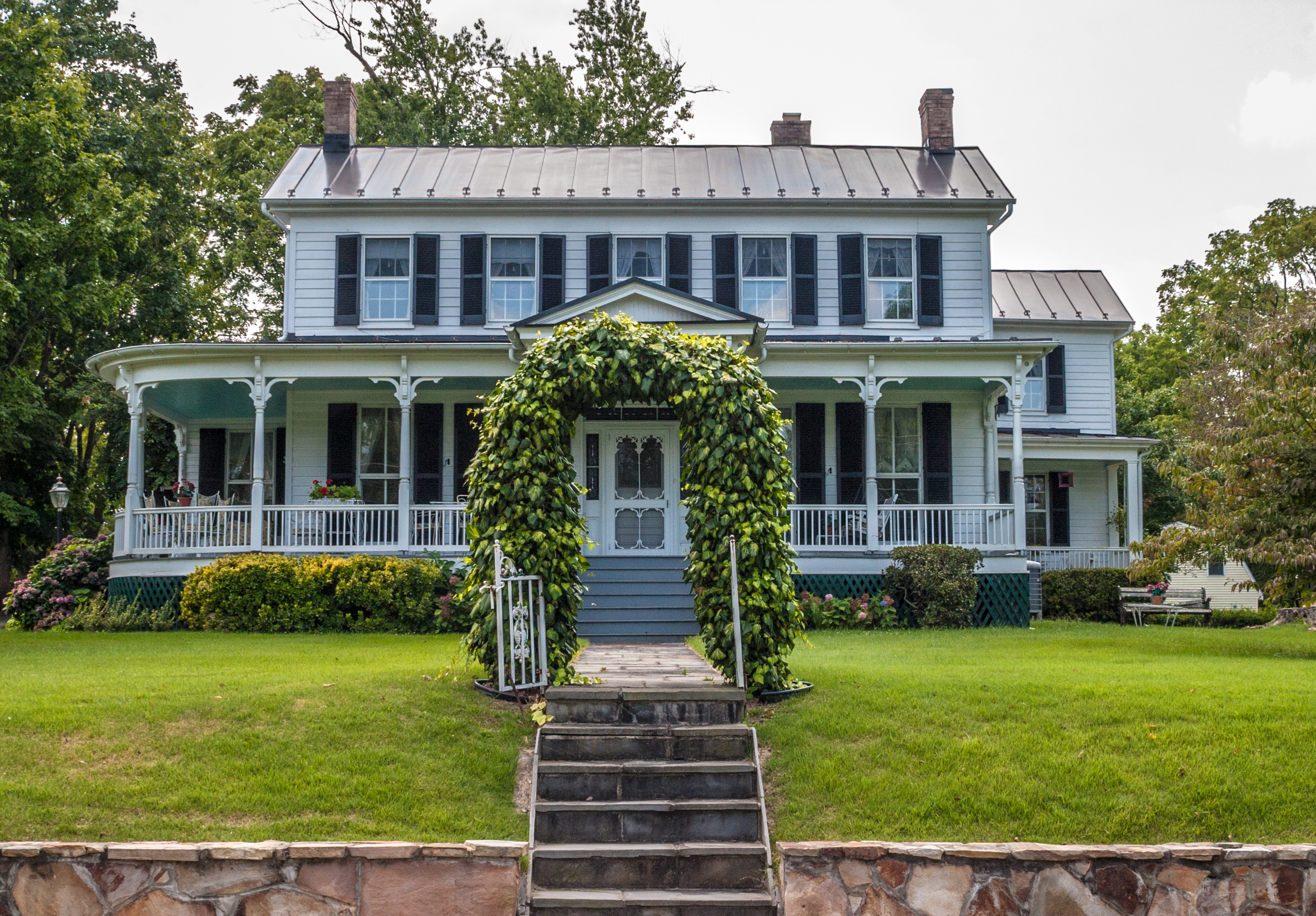
- Janney House, 2013

- Location within Northern Virginia Location within Virginia Location within the United States
- Location: 15 W. Colonial Hwy., Hamilton, Virginia
- Coordinates: 39°8′4″N 77°39′55″W
- Area: 1 acre (0.40 ha)
- Built: 1876
- Built by: Thomas, J.H.; Silcott, Charles
- Architectural style: Late Victorian, Folk Victorian
- NRHP reference No.: 04001269
- VLR No.: 232-5006

Significant dates
- Added to NRHP: November 27, 2004
- Designated VLR: March 17, 2004

Janney House, also known as Morrison House and Janney Hill, is a historic home located at Hamilton, Loudoun County, Virginia. It was built in 1876, and is a 2 1/2-story, five-bay, wood frame I-house in the Late Victorian style. It sits on a stone foundation and has a standing seam metal side gable roof. It features a one-story, wraparound porch. Also on the property is a contributing combination garage and stable building.

It was listed on the National Register of Historic Places in 2004.
