= Glebe of Shelburne Parish =

Historic house in Virginia, US

- U.S. National Register of Historic Places
- Virginia Landmarks Register
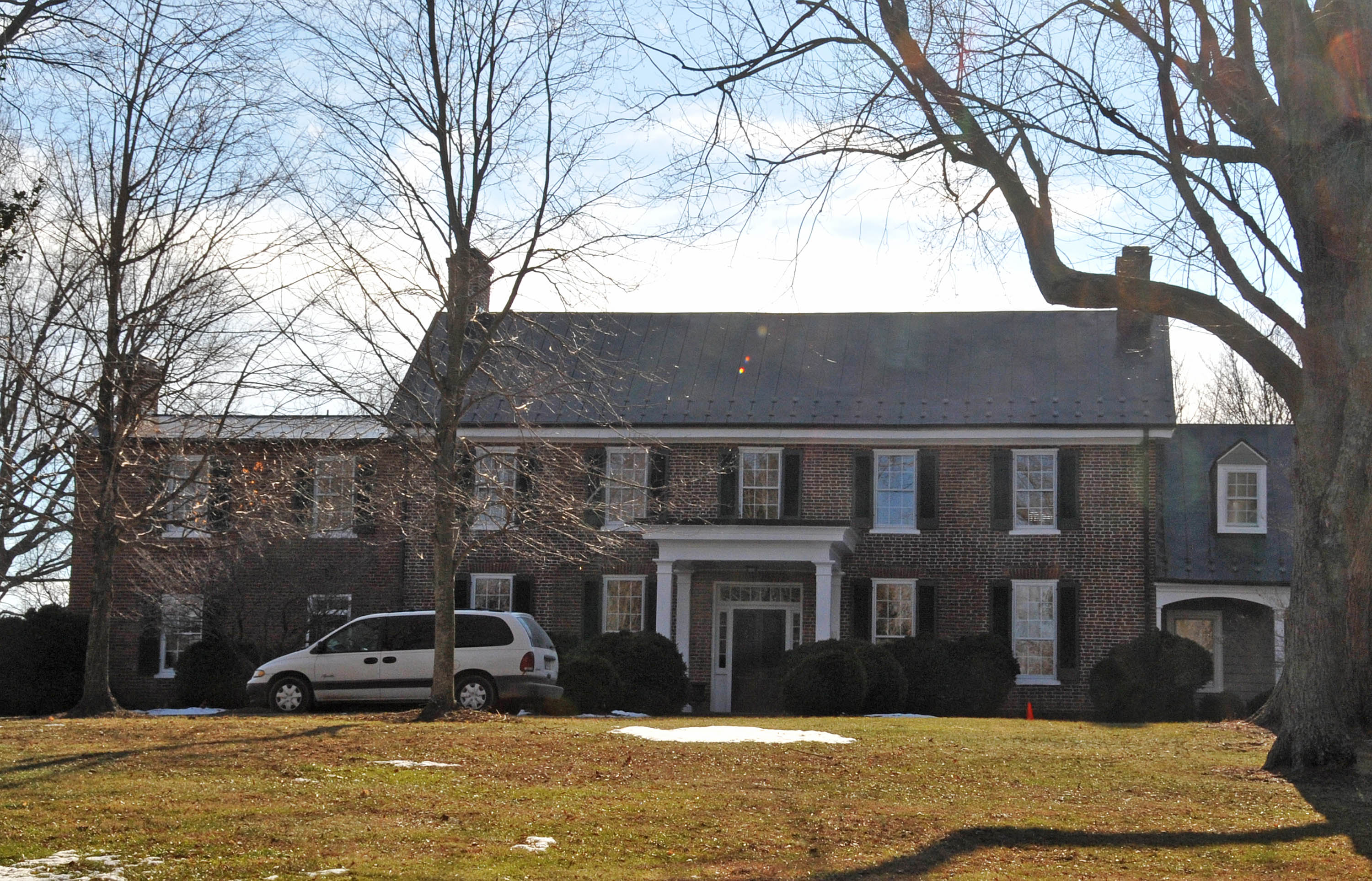

- Location within Northern Virginia Location within Virginia Location within the United States
- Location: 3.5 miles (5.6 km) south of Lincoln off VA 728, near Lincoln, Virginia
- Coordinates: 39°04′12.85″N 77°40′31.75″W
- Area: 734 acres (297 ha)
- NRHP reference No.: 75002023
- VLR No.: 053-0186

Significant dates
- Added to NRHP: April 1, 1975
- Designated VLR: November 19, 1974

The Glebe of Shelburne Parish is a house built as a glebe in rural Loudoun County, Virginia around 1775 to attract a cleric to preach in the Shelburne Parish of the Anglican Church. Shelburne Parish, named for the Earls of Shelburne, desired in 1771 that a minister preach at Leesburg, Virginia every three months. The absence of a glebe and glebe lands detracted from efforts to recruit a parson, so in 1773 the parish purchased 473 acres (191 ha) and built a house on the property.

The two-story brick house stands on a hilltop overlooking Goose Creek. There are five bays, of which two may have been added. A two-bay kitchen wing is appended. The interior, which by vestry order was to include one large room 20 feet (6.1 m) by 20 feet (6.1 m) and another 18 feet (5.5 m) by 19 feet (5.8 m), follows a hall-and-parlor plan. The interior may not have been completed until after the American Revolution, as its detailing is Greek Revival in character. The property includes a number of outbuildings, including an ice house and a kitchen.

Virginia ordered the sale of all glebes in 1802, but the parish resisted. Legal action was not settled until 1830, and the property was finally sold in 1840. It was placed on the National Register of Historic Places on April 1, 1975. The Shelburne Glebe is contained within the larger Goose Creek Historic District, a rural landscape.
