= Goose Creek Meetinghouse Complex =

Historic church in Virginia, United States

- Goose Creek Meeting House Complex
- U.S. National Register of Historic Places
- Virginia Landmarks Register
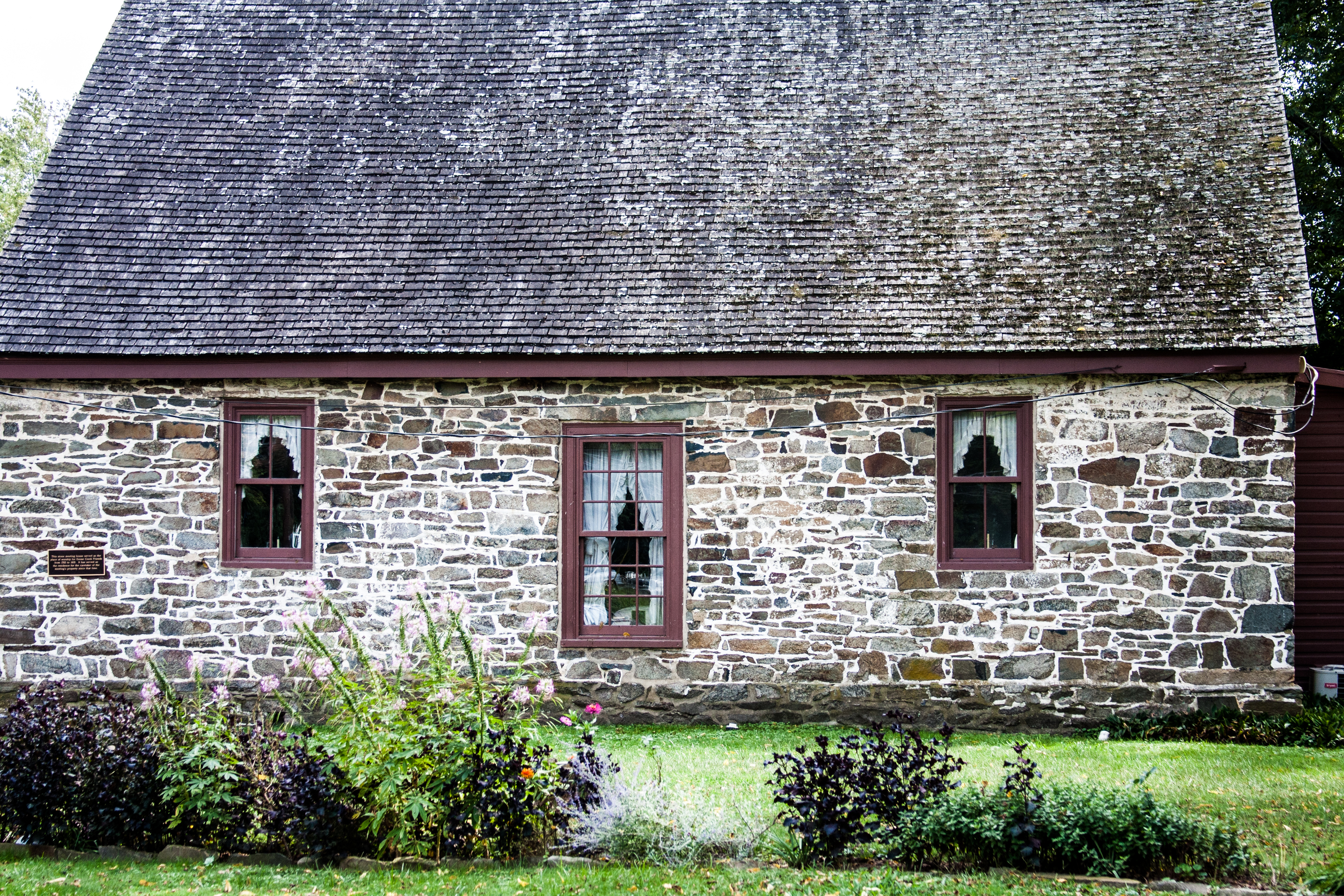
- Goose Creek Friends Caretaker House, September 2012

- Location within Northern Virginia Location within Virginia Location within the United States
- Location: S of VA 7, Lincoln, Virginia
- Coordinates: 39°06′48.92″N 77°41′40.96″W
- Area: 14 acres (5.7 ha)
- Built: 1765
- NRHP reference No.: 74002135
- VLR No.: 053-0305

Significant dates
- Added to NRHP: July 24, 1974
- Designated VLR: January 15, 1974

The Goose Creek Meeting House Complex is a Quaker worship center, with an original 1765 Meeting House, an 1817 meeting house, a burying ground, and the Oakdale schoolhouse in the village of Lincoln, Virginia. The complex is on the site of the original log meeting house, built about 1750. The 1765 meeting house is a one-story stone building, and was converted to a residence after the construction of the 1817 meeting house.

The 1817 meeting house was originally built as a two-story brick building, but was damaged in a windstorm in 1944 and its upper story was removed. The building remained unrepaired for some years after the storm because of wartime restrictions on building materials. Due to a schism in American Quakerism in the early 19th century, there was a second Quaker meeting in Lincoln. Friends from this meeting, known as "Orthodox" Friends, invited the members of Goose Creek to worship with them until the Goose Creek Meeting House could be repaired. When the repairs were completed, the two meetings reunited to form the Goose Creek United Meeting, worshipping in the now-single story 1817 meeting house. The 1817 meeting house was enlarged with the addition of a Gathering Room or First Day School room in 1982

Today, the meeting house continues to be an active center for worship and the activities of the Monthly and Yearly Meetings of Friends.

The schoolhouse is a one-story brick building on a stone foundation, built in 1815. Oakdale School was the first public school in Loudoun County, Virginia, and following the American Civil War was the first school in the region to offer education to African-American children.

The complex was listed on the National Register of Historic Places on July 24, 1974.

The Goose Creek Meeting House complex and the village of Lincoln lie within the Goose Creek Historic District, a rural landscape district.
