= Lincoln, Virginia =

Unincorporated community in Virginia, United States

- Unincorporated village
- Location within Northern Virginia Location within Virginia Location within the United States
- Coordinates: 39°6′55″N 77°41′42″W
- Country: United States
- State: Virginia
- County: Loudoun
- Time zone: UTC−5 (Eastern (EST))
  - Summer (DST): UTC−4 (EDT)
- ZIP code: 20160

Lincoln is a historic unincorporated village in the Loudoun Valley of Loudoun County, Virginia, United States, located approximately 1.5 miles (2.4 km) south of Purcellville. It was established as the community of Goose Creek during the 1750s by Quaker settlers and renamed "Lincoln" for the president of the same name, shortly after his election in 1860.

Lining the main road through the village are several stately homes, the Goose Creek Friends Meeting House, the Glebe of Shelburne Parish, and a historic Quaker cemetery. The village is surrounded by and included in the Goose Creek Historic District.

== Climate ==
The climate in this area is characterized by hot, humid summers and generally mild to cool winters. According to the Köppen Climate Classification system, Lincoln has a humid subtropical climate, abbreviated "Cfa" on climate maps.

== Notable people ==
- Sara Haines Smith Hoge (1864-1939), President, Virginia Woman's Christian Temperance Union
