= Hamilton, Virginia =

- Town
- Town of Hamilton
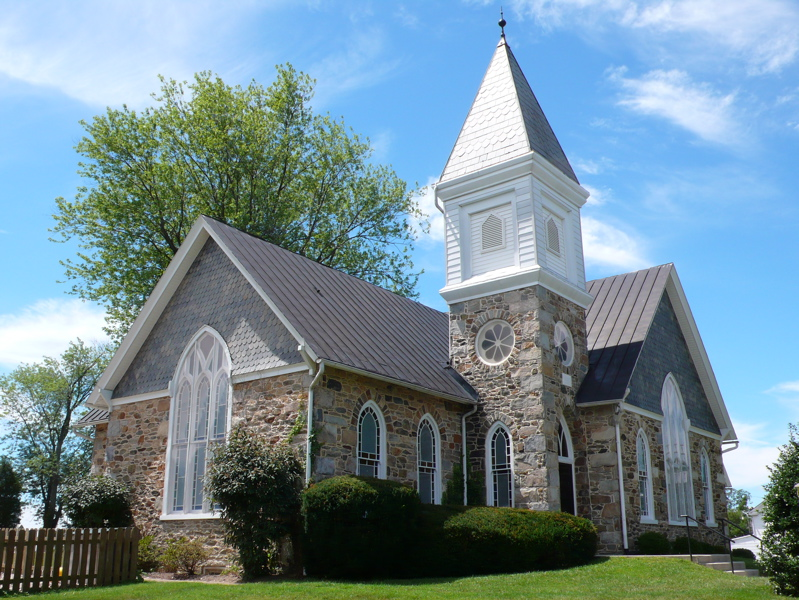
- The Harmony United Methodist Church in Hamilton

- Location within Northern Virginia Location within Virginia Location within the United States
- Coordinates: 39°8′2″N 77°39′51″W
- Country: United States
- State: Virginia
- County: Loudoun

Government
  - Mayor: Ken Wine

Area
  - Total: 0.21 sq mi (0.54 km^{2})
  - Land: 0.21 sq mi (0.54 km^{2})
  - Water: 0 sq mi (0.00 km^{2})
- Elevation: 512 ft (156 m)

Population (2020)
  - Total: 619
  - Estimate (2019): 629
  - Density: 3,008.7/sq mi (1,161.67/km^{2})
- Time zone: UTC−5 (Eastern (EST))
  - Summer (DST): UTC−4 (EDT)
- ZIP codes: 20158-20159
- Area code: 540
- FIPS code: 51-34240
- GNIS feature ID: 1499516
- Website: hamiltonva.gov

Hamilton is a town in the Loudoun Valley of Loudoun County, Virginia, United States. As of the 2020 census, Hamilton had a population of 619.

== Geography ==
Hamilton is located six miles west of the county seat of Leesburg at 39°8′2″N 77°39′51″W (39.133889, −77.664151), near the western base of Catoctin Mountain.

According to the United States Census Bureau, the town has a total area of 0.2 square miles (0.6 km^{2}), all land.

== History ==
The present Town of Hamilton was once occupied by several native tribes. European settlers arrived in the 1730s. In 1768, George and Tabitha Roach Tavenner built the first house in the Hamilton area. Their son, Richard and his wife Ann Hatcher, built an estate called Harmony and the surrounding area was thereafter known as Harmony.

The Leesburg and Snickers Gap Turnpike Company opened a road connecting Leesburg and Snickersville in 1831. Growth ensued and by 1833, the area had enough population to sustain Harmony Methodist Church, which was built on land donated by Richard and Ann Hatcher Tavenner. The town also became known as Hamilton Store after a store founded there by Charles Bennett Hamilton. In 1835, John Quincy Adams approved a post office located in Hamilton's store and the town's name was recorded as Hamilton.

The last important Civil War action in Loudoun County, known as The Harmony Skirmish, took place on March 21, 1865, as confederate Colonel John S. Mosby and his troops surprised troops commanded by Colonel Marcus Reno.

By 1868, a steam railroad from Alexandria had come to Hamilton along the future route of the Washington and Old Dominion Railroad. Many tourists came to the town seeking relief from the city's heat. There was a 1 1/2-mile boardwalk that traversed the town and a dance hall. By 1900, the Town of Hamilton was Loudoun County's second largest town. The booming businesses in Hamilton included two newspapers, a butcher shop, a men's clothing store, a broom factory, a milliner, a dentist, two hardware stores, a stove shop, a flat racecourse, a livery stable and boarding houses.

The advent of the automobile led to a slow decline in tourism. In 1926, many of the town's central businesses were destroyed by fire and tourism thereafter declined sharply. Hamilton has since been known more as a residential community.

During the town's history, it was the site of a vibrant Afro-American community.

The Hamilton Masonic Lodge, Janney House, William Smith House, Spring Hill Farm, and Sunnyside Farm are listed on the National Register of Historic Places.

== Transportation ==
=== Highways ===
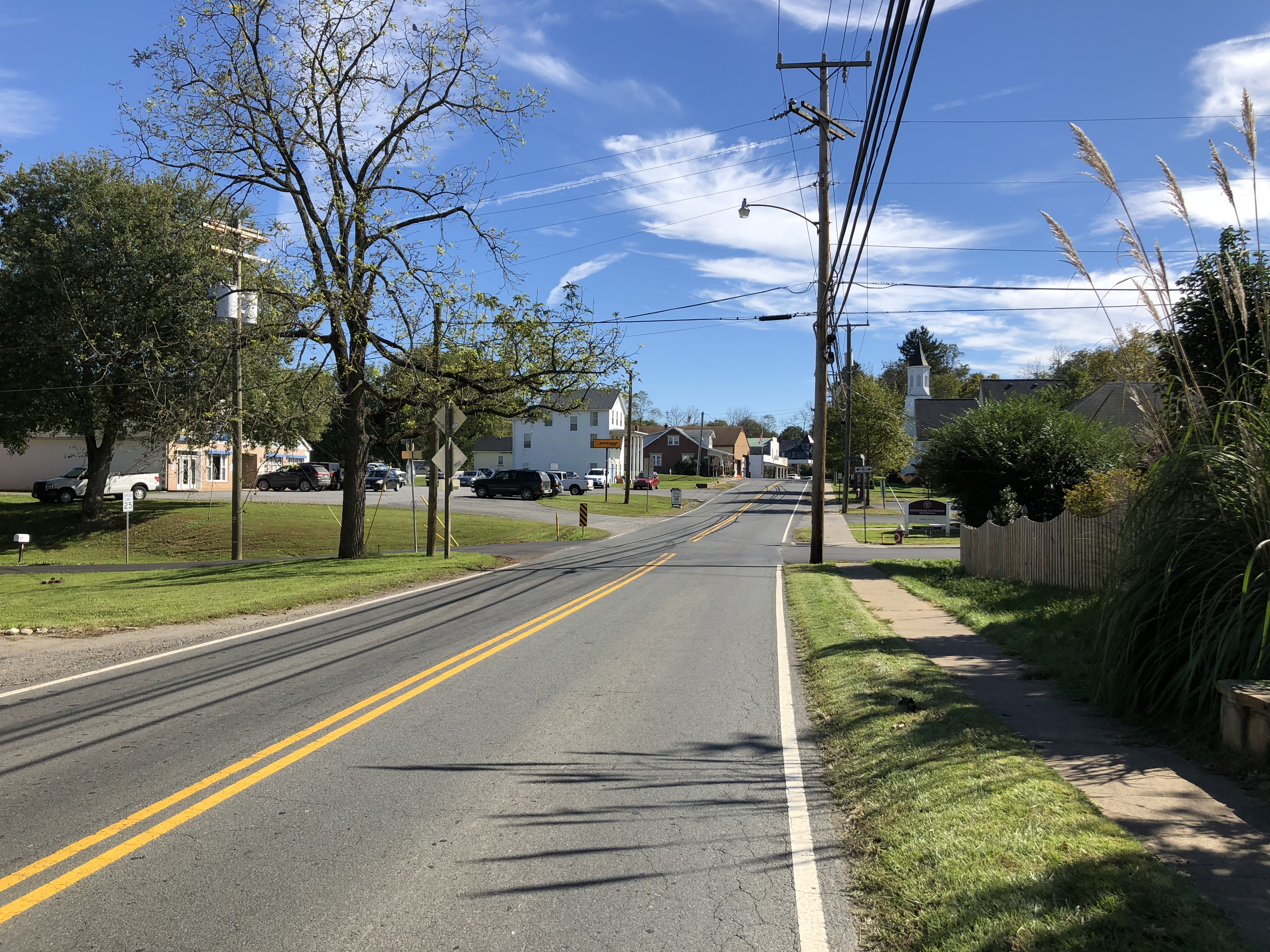
SR 7 Bus in Hamilton

The only primary highway directly serving Hamilton is Virginia State Route 7 Business. SR 7 Bus follows Colonial Highway west to east through central Hamilton, connecting to Purcellville to the west and Leesburg to the east. Virginia State Route 7, which originally followed Colonial Highway through Hamilton, now bypasses the town just to the north. Via SR 7, travelers may head westward to Winchester or turn eastward, eventually reaching Alexandria. SR 7 also interchanges with Interstate 66, Interstate 81, Interstate 395 and Interstate 495.

=== Public transportation ===
The Harmony Park and ride lot is located in Hamilton, which is served by Loudoun County Transit.

Route 40 (Purcellville Connector) operated by Virginia Regional Transit, serves Hamilton.

== Demographics ==
Historical population
Census	Pop.	Note	%±
1880	248		—
1890	407		64.1%
1900	364		−10.6%
1910	315		−13.5%
1920	287		−8.9%
1930	295		2.8%
1940	409		38.6%
1950	351		−14.2%
1960	403		14.8%
1970	502		24.6%
1980	598		19.1%
1990	700		17.1%
2000	562		−19.7%
2010	506		−10.0%
2020	619		22.3%
U.S. Decennial Census

As of the census of 2000, there were 562 people, 216 households, and 157 families living in the town. The population density was 2,218.2 people per square mile (868.0/km^{2}). There were 224 housing units at an average density of 884.1 per square mile (345.9/km^{2}). The racial makeup of the town was 97.69% White, 1.42% African American, 0.53% Asian, 0.36% from other races. Hispanic or Latino of any race were 1.07% of the population.

There were 216 households, out of which 41.7% had children under the age of 18 living with them, 58.3% were married couples living together, 13.0% had a female householder with no husband present, and 26.9% were non-families. 21.8% of all households were made up of individuals, and 6.5% had someone living alone who was 65 years of age or older. The average household size was 2.60 and the average family size was 3.05.

In the town, the population was spread out, with 28.3% under the age of 18, 4.4% from 18 to 24, 33.3% from 25 to 44, 26.0% from 45 to 64, and 8.0% who were 65 years of age or older. The median age was 37 years. For every 100 females, there were 87.3 males. For every 100 females aged 18 and over, there were 79.9 males.

The median income for a household in the town was $59,688, and the median income for a family was $73,333. Males had a median income of $53,571 versus $32,857 for females. The per capita income for the town was $27,474. About 2.4% of families and 3.3% of the population were below the poverty line, including 3.6% of those under age 18 and 6.1% of those age 65 or over.

== Notable people ==
- Jimmye Laycock, college football player and coach
- Ashley Caldwell, 2010 US Ski Team Member US Olympic Team Member Aerials (youngest US Olympian in the 2010 Vancouver Games)
