= William Averell =

16th-century English pamphleteer, prose writer, parish clerk, and schoolmaster

William Averell (baptised 12 February 1556 – buried 23 September 1605) was an English pamphleteer, prose writer, parish clerk, and schoolmaster. He is best known as the author of A Mervalious Combat of Contrarieties (1588) that William Shakespeare used as the source for the parable of the revolt of the members against the belly in Coriolanus.

== Birth, life, and death ==
Averell's baptism on 12 February 1556 is recorded in the records of the parish of St Peter upon Cornhill. His father, a joiner, was John Averell (d. 1569), and his mother Margareth (d. 1578). Nothing is known about his early life and education, but William E. Burns, writing about Averell in the Oxford Dictionary of National Biography, notes that he was a member of the Worshipful Company of Merchant Taylors and the Worshipful Company of Vintners. Burns also notes that Averell's prose is Euphuistic and draws on classical knowledge, despite there being no record of his having graduated from Oxford or Cambridge.

On 2 November 1578 he married Gyllian Averell, née Goodale (1556–1596), the daughter of a baker, Robert Goodale and his wife, Ann. Their first child, Annes, was born three months after the wedding. Burns points out the irony of Averell conceiving a child before marriage given the moralism of some of his pamphlets. Gyllian Averell died in 1596, shortly after the birth of their 17th child.

Averell remarried and had a further daughter, Elizabeth, born 28 November 1597. Averell died in 1605 and was buried in St Peter upon Cornhill on 23 September.

== Works ==
Averell supported himself by working as a parish clerk and schoolmaster in St Peter upon Cornhill, where he adorned the parish registers with drawings and poems. He was also a pamphleteer and prose writer, and "published several works showing literary versatility and a keen desire to acquire the patronage of the London civic élite."

His first known publication, An excellent historie, both pithy and pleasant, on the life and death of Charles and Julia, two Brittish, or rather Welsh lovers (1581), was a verse story of star-crossed lovers set in the period of British mythology at the time of Brutus of Troy, and was dedicated to Henry Campyon, a mercer and brewer. Burns describes it as "not a distinguished piece of literature", but it was one of the few romantic poems of the period that used a British rather than Italian setting.

The next was A wonderfull and straunge newes, which happened in the county of Suffolke, and Essex, the first of February, being Friday, where it rayned wheat, the space of vi or vii miles compass (1583). This was a prodigy pamphlet that took a zealously Protestant stand, arguing that the referenced wonder was a sign of the end of the world. It was followed by A Dyall for Dainty Darlings (1584), dedicated to William Wrathe, warden of the Mercers' Company. (Note: It also identifies Averell on its title-page as "Student in Divinitie and Schoolmaister".) This was expanded and reissued as Four Notable Histories (1590), now dedicated to Hugh Ofley. (Note: Ofley was a London alderman, leatherworker, and Marian exile.)

The publication for which Averell is best known is A Mervalious Combat of Contrarieties (1588). (Note: It was later reprinted as a part of Four Notable Histories (1590).) It begins as a dialogue between the parts of the body in which the tongue urges the body to revolt against the belly and back because of their greed and pride, but is ultimately unmasked as a traitor. Averell eventually abandons the dialogue format and concludes with an exhortation to loyalty to the queen. It was published during the Armada crisis, dedicated to Sir George Bond, the Lord Mayor of London, and includes fierce attacks on Roman Catholics and Jesuits. It was also the principal source for William Shakespeare's use of the parable of the revolt of the members against the belly in Coriolanus.

== Sources ==
- Burns, William E. (2004). "Averell, William (bap. 1556, d. 1605)". Oxford Dictionary of National Biography (online ed.). Oxford University Press. doi:10.1093/ref:odnb/40543. (Subscription or UK public library membership required.)
