= Cardinal District =

The Cardinal District is a high school conference in the state of Virginia that includes schools exclusively from Prince William County. This district used to serve as one of the four districts in the AAA Northwestern Region, exclusively as Prince Williams' 6 highest enrolled high schools at the time, alongside Osbourn within the city of Manassas. The District, nowadays, serves as one of the three districts represented in Class 6 Region B, which is a modernized version of the Northwestern Region.

== Membership History ==
=== Current members ===
As of 2026, the seven schools in the district are:

- C.D. Hylton Bulldogs of Woodbridge
- Colgan Sharks of Manassas
- Forest Park Bruins of Woodbridge
- Freedom Eagles of Woodbridge
- Gar-Field Red Wolves of Woodbridge
- Potomac Panthers of Dumfries
- Woodbridge Vikings of Woodbridge

=== Former Members ===
- Battlefield Bobcats of Haymarket (2013-2017)
- Osbourn Eagles of Manassas (2013-2017)
- Osbourn Park Yellow Jackets of Manassas (2009-2013)
- Stonewall Jackson Raiders of Manassas (2013-2017)
- Patriot Pioneers of Nokesville (2013-2017)
