= Cedar Run District =

United States secondary education sports conference

The Cedar Run District is a high school conference in the US state of Virginia that includes schools from Prince William County, Manassas, & Loudoun County.

== History ==
The Cedar Run District was established in 2001 to serve two purposes. The first was to alleviate crowding in the Cardinal District, and the second purpose was to be a fourth district in the Northwestern Region, after two Southwest Virginia AAA Districts were consolidated into the Western Valley District.

=== District history ===
The charter members of the Cedar Run were Osbourn, Osbourn Park, Potomac, and Stonewall Jackson which all split from the Cardinal District. As Prince William County grew, Battlefield High School of Haymarket opened and joined the district in 2004. In 2005, Potomac was moved back to the Cardinal District, but the Cedar Run accepted Culpeper County High School from the Commonwealth District and Fauquier High School of the AA Northwestern District which expanded the district's geography considerably. In 2007, the Cedar Run District welcomed two more members, Liberty High School of Fauquier County from the AA Northwestern District, and Loudoun Valley High School of the AAA National District.

In 2009–2010, Liberty High School, Fauquier High School, and Culpeper County High School moved down to AA because of new schools opening up in their respective areas. A preliminary plan had two additional Loudoun County schools joining the district with Heritage High School of Leesburg coming from Group AA, and Stone Bridge High School of Ashburn coming from the Liberty District and AAA Northern Region. In addition, Osbourn Park was also expected to move back to the Cardinal District. However the preliminary plan was not passed and Stone Bridge was granted the right to stay in the Northern Region, Liberty District. Starting in the 2009/2010 school year the Cedar Run only had five members; Heritage, Loudoun Valley, Battlefield, Stonewall Jackson, and Osbourn. The smallest member is Heritage with an enrollment of about 1,900 students and the largest is Battlefield with an enrollment of about 3,700.

In 2011–2012, Heritage-Leeseburg and Loudoun Valley returned to AA while be replaced in the Cedar Run District by Freedom-South Riding and Broad Run which moved up to AAA.

== 2017-2018 District champions ==
Fall Sports District Champions

- Cheerleading:
- Boys Cross Country: Patriot
- Girls Cross Country: Osbourn Park
- Field Hockey:
- Golf:
- Football: Patriot
- Volleyball: Patriot

Winter Sports District Champions

- Boys Basketball: Patriot
- Girls Basketball: Osbourn Park
- Girls Gymnastics:
- Boys Swimming:
- Girls Swimming:
- Boys Indoor Track:
- Girls Indoor Track:
- Wrestling:

Spring Sports District Champions

- Baseball:
- Boys Lacrosse:
- Girls Lacrosse:
- Boys Soccer: Battlefield
- Girls Soccer: Patriot
- Softball:
- Boys Tennis:
- Girls Tennis:
- Boys Track:
- Girls Track:

== 2020-2021 District champions ==
Fall Sports District Champions (Canceled Due To Pandemic)

- Cheerleading: N/A
- Boys Cross Country: N/A
- Girls Cross Country: N/A
- Field Hockey: N/A
- Golf: N/A
- Football: N/A
- Volleyball: N/A

Winter Sports District Champions (Canceled Due To Pandemic)

- Boys Basketball: N/A
- Girls Basketball: N/A
- Girls Gymnastics: N/A
- Boys Swimming: N/A
- Girls Swimming: N/A
- Boys Indoor Track: N/A
- Girls Indoor Track: N/A
- Wrestling: N/A

Spring Sports District Champions

- Baseball: Battlefield
- Boys Lacrosse: Battlefield
- Girls Lacrosse: Battlefield
- Boys Soccer: Osbourn
- Girls Soccer: Patriot
- Softball: Osbourn Park
- Boys Tennis:
- Girls Tennis:
- Boys Track:
- Girls Track:

== 2021-2022 District champions ==
Fall Sports District Champions

- Cheerleading:
- Boys Cross Country:
- Girls Cross Country:
- Field Hockey:
- Golf:
- Football: Battlefield
- Volleyball:

Winter Sports District Champions

- Boys Basketball: Patriot
- Girls Basketball: Osbourn Park
- Girls Gymnastics:
- Boys Swimming:
- Girls Swimming:
- Boys Indoor Track:
- Girls Indoor Track:
- Wrestling:

Spring Sports District Champions

- Baseball:
- Boys Lacrosse:
- Girls Lacrosse:
- Boys Soccer: Osbourn
- Girls Soccer: John Champe
- Softball:
- Boys Tennis:
- Girls Tennis:
- Boys Track:
- Girls Track:

== Membership history ==
=== Current members ===
- Battlefield Bobcats of Haymarket
- Independence Tigers of Ashburn
- Osbourn Eagles of Manassas
- Osbourn Park Yellow Jackets of Manassas
- Patriot Pioneers of Nokesville
- Unity Reed Lions of Manassas
- Gainesville Cardinals of Gainesville

=== Former members ===
- Broad Run Spartans of Ashburn (2011-2013)
- Culpeper Blue Devils of Culpeper (2005-2009)
- Fauquier Falcons of Fauquier (2005-2009)
- Freedom Eagles of South Riding (2011-2012, 2021-2025)
- Heritage Pride of Leesburg (2009-2011)
- John Champe Knights of Aldie (2019-2023)
- Liberty Eagles of Bealeton (2007-2009)
- Loudoun Valley Vikings Purcellville (2007-2011)
- Potomac Panthers of Dumfries (2001-2004)
