= Bill Holsclaw =

American football player coach (1936–2021)

Biographical details
- Born: May 26, 1936; Charleston, West Virginia, U.S.
- Died: November 7, 2021 (aged 85); Manassas, Virginia, U.S.

Playing career
- 1956–1958: Virginia Tech
- Position: Quarterback

Coaching career (HC unless noted)
- 1959: Big Creek HS (WV) (assistant)
- 1960–1962: Spotsylvania HS (VA)
- 1963–1971: Osbourn HS (VA)
- 1972–1974: Woodbridge HS (VA) (assistant)
- 1975–1987: Woodbridge HS (VA)

Head coaching record
- Overall: 135–111–3

John William Holsclaw III (May 26, 1936 – November 7, 2021) was American football player and coach. He played quarterback for the Virginia Tech Hokies.

Holsclaw attended Charleston High School in Charleston, West Virginia. He played at the tailback position in high school.

Holsclaw played college football at Virginia Tech under head coach Frank Moseley from 1956 to 1958. He was the starting quarterback of the 1958 team and became the first Virginia Tech player to tally 1,000 passing yards in a season. He also set new Southern Conference single-season records for both passing yards (1,013) and total offense (1,227 yards). His 1958 total also ranked sixth nationally in total offense. At the end of the 1958 season, he was selected by the Associated Press as the quarterback of the all-Southern Conference football team. He was also named the most valuable player within the boundaries of the Southern and Atlantic Coast Conferences.

Holsclaw later worked as a high school teacher and coach. He was a football coach at Big Creek High School (assistant coach, 1959), Spotsylvania High School (head coach, 1960–1962), Osbourn High School (1963–1971), and Woodbridge High School (assistant, 1972–1974; head coach, 1975–1989).

Holsclaw and his wife Yvonne had four children: Kirsten, Olga, T.D., and Ryan.

Holsclaw died on November 7, 2021.
