= Osbourn Park High School =

Coordinates: 38.763°N 77.45°W

Location
- 8909 Euclid Avenue; Manassas, Virginia 20111; United States

Information
- School type: Public, high school
- Founded: 1975
- School district: Prince William County Public Schools
- Principal: Lisamarie Kane
- Teaching staff: 150.93 (on an FTE basis)
- Grades: 9–12
- Enrollment: 2,757 (2021–22)
- Student to teacher ratio: 18.27
- Colors: Blue and Gold
- Mascot: Yellow Jacket
- Rival: Osbourn High School
- Feeder schools: Parkside Middle School
- Website: osbournparkhs.pwcs.edu

Osbourn Park High School is a Prince William County, Virginia public high school in a small county island between the cities of Manassas and Manassas Park, southwest of Washington D.C.

Osbourn Park serves the mid-part of the county. Osbourn Park has also been designated as Prince William County's The Center for Biotechnology and Engineering and houses two other unique programs: Allied Health and NJROTC. It has at various times had a student population ranging from 1900 to 3200, but it is currently around 2500 grades 9-12.

== History and Administration ==
Osbourn Park High School was first opened in 1975, serving students in both Manassas and Manassas Park. Shortly after the school opened, Manassas City and Manassas Park left Prince William County Schools, and created their own school systems (this created Osbourn High School and Manassas Park High School). The school was named for Eugenia Osbourn, a longtime Manassas educator.

=== Architecture ===
Osbourn Park was a classic school of the 1970s, constructed with open, modular classrooms. Renovations began in 2005 to update the nearly thirty-year-old interior of the building. Some of the changes include permanent walls for classrooms including doors, new floors, and newly painted walls. Unity Reed High School, another county high school constructed around the same time, is an exact replica of Osbourn Park. Both schools have a red brick facade.

=== Administration ===
The Principal of Osbourn Park High School is Lisamarie Kane. Before her appointment in 2021, she was an assistant principal at Gar-Field Senior High School. In 2024, Kane received the 2024 Outstanding High School Principal from the Virginia Association of Secondary School Principals.

== Demographics ==
In the 2023-2024 school year, Osbourn Park's student body of 2,744 was:

- 16.3% Black/African American
- 44.9% Hispanic
- 20.7% White
- 13.1% Asian
- 4.4% Two or More Races
- .4% Native Hawaiian/Pacific Islander
- .1% American Indian/Alaskan

== Academics ==
=== Programs ===
Center for Biotechnology and Engineering

Osbourn Park offers the Biotechnology program. It is a four-year program for students interested in Science, Technology, Engineering and Mathematics (STEM) related fields. The Biotechnology Program allows students to enroll in a variety of Advanced Placement (AP) science courses.

Osbourn Park High School recently purchased class sets of iPads. and the pre-governors school program.

CTE Programs

Osbourn Park also offers specialty programs through their automotive program, firefighting program, Navy JROTC, practical nursing program and project lead-the-way.

Fine and Performing Arts

Osbourn Park is a Virginia Music Educators Association (VMEA) Blue-Ribbon Award-winning school. Osbourn Park's Madrigal Singers was one of the four high school choir and orchestra groups that performed at the 2023 VMEA Convention.

== Athletics ==
=== Athletics ===
Osbourn Park High School is in the 6A Cedar Run District of the Virginia High School League. The school offers Cheer, Cross Country, Field Hockey, Football, golf, basketball, gymnastics, indoor and outdoor track, swimming and diving, baseball, crew, lacrosse, soccer, softball, and tennis.

=== State Championships ===
In 2024, Osbourn Park High School, won the 6A Girls Softball Championship, defeating Battlefield High School. In 2025, Osbourn Park High School won the Girls' Basketball State Championship, and repeated in 2026.

== Notable alumni ==
- David Robinson, Class of 1983, Basketball Hall of Fame player (center, San Antonio Spurs), alumnus of the United States Naval Academy, nicknamed "The Admiral".
- Leeann Tweeden, Class of 1991 (graduated in 3 years), model (Playboy, Frederick's of Hollywood, Hooters, Venus Swimwear) and TV personality (ESPN2, Fox Sports Network).
- Andrew Dykstra, Class of 2004, D.C. United Goalkeeper
- Travis Tucker, Class of 2001, semifinalist on American Idol Season 4.
- Julie Croteau, Class of 1988, first woman to play men's NCAA baseball, and first woman to coach men's NCAA Division I baseball.
- Jason Richardson, Class of 2009, current musician for All That Remains and solo project, former band Chelsea Grin and Born of Osiris
- Nico Greetham, Class of 2013, Season 10 finalist of So You Think You Can Dance, actor seen in American Horror Story, The Prom and Love, Victor.

== See also ==
- Prince William County Public Schools
