= Woodbridge High School (Virginia) =

Woodbridge Senior High School

Location
- 3001 Old Bridge Road; Woodbridge, Virginia 22192

Information
- School type: Public, high school
- Established: 1964
- School district: Prince William County Public Schools
- Principal: Heather Abney
- Teaching staff: 166.75 (on an FTE basis)
- Grades: 9–12
- Enrollment: 2,905 (2022–23)
- Average class size: English: 30; Math: 30; Science: 30; Social Studies: 30
- Student to teacher ratio: 17.42
- Color: Green And Gold
- Mascot: Viking
- Specialty Programs: AP Scholars; Army JROTC; Cosmetology; Project Lead The Way
- Website: https://woodbridgehs.pwcs.edu

Woodbridge Senior High School is a public high school located in Lake Ridge (northwest of Woodbridge), Prince William County, Virginia, United States.

== History and administration ==
The school opened in 1964 in the Marumsco Hills Subdivision due to extensive development of the Woodbridge community by Cecil D. Hylton. Classes were originally held at 2201 York Drive (now Woodbridge Middle School). Classes moved to the current building (3001 Old Bridge Road) in 1974. The first class to graduate having attended the full four years at the current building was the class of 1978.

=== Overcrowding ===
Parents have become concerned with overcrowding in the school. There are several teachers that are "rovers", teachers that take over another teacher's classroom during a free period. At over 2800 students, the school is over capacity. Prince William County Schools plans to build a 14th high school to relieve overcrowding in Woodbridge. However, the project, which has been discussed since 2017 and was originally slated for completion in 2026, has been pushed back to 2029.

=== Administration ===
The principal of Woodbridge Senior High School is Heather Abney. She has been the school's principal since 2016.

In 2026, Woodbridge's administration suspended 323 students for leaving school property during an anti-ICE protest.

== Geography ==
Woodbridge Senior High School is located at 34°41′02″N 105°23′11″W (34.683826, -105.386308). Woodbridge High School is of similar design as nearby Gar-Field High School, which was also built in the mid-1970s.

== Academics ==
=== Accreditation ===
Woodbridge Senior High School is fully accredited.

=== Programs ===
AP Scholars

Woodbridge High School is one of the two high schools in Prince William County to host the AP Scholars Program (the other school is Patriot High School). Launched at the school in 2017, the program is aligned with Advanced Placement Program from The College Board. Students in the program are responsible for completing a research project during their senior year. Students must also complete at least five AP courses before graduation and 60 hours of community service.

CTE Programs

Woodbridge houses an Army JROTC Program, an Aviation Maintenance Program, and a Cosmetology Program.

Fine and Performing Arts

The school also used to be home to the Center for Fine and Performing Arts (CFPA) until 2016, when the program was officially moved to the newly constructed Colgan High School. Because of this, the class of 2017 was the last graduating class to contain students who had been a part of the CFPA at Woodbridge. Woodbridge still has an established performing arts program; the school recently earned the VMEA Blue Ribbon Award.

Project Lead the Way (PLTW)

Woodbridge is one of four high schools in Prince William County to host Project Lead the Way (PLTW) (the others being Patriot High School, Gar-Field High School, and Battlefield High School). The school offers some of PLTW's engineering courses, including:

- Introduction to Engineering Design
- Principles of Engineering
- Digital Electronics, and
- Civil Engineering and Architecture

== Demographics ==
In 2013 it had 2,830 students, one of the largest such figures in the schools in Prince William County. In 2013 the student body became plurality white as ethnic diversity increased.

In the 2017-2018 school year, Woodbridge's student body was:

- 22.3% Black/African American
- 33.6% Hispanic
- 29.3% White
- 7.7% Asian
- 6.8% Two or More Races
- .3% American Indian/Alaskan
- .2% Hawaiian/Pacific Islander

== Athletics ==
Woodbridge Senior High School is in the 6A Cardinal District of the Virginia High School League. The school offers Cheer, Cross Country, Field Hockey, Football, golf, basketball, gymnastics, indoor and outdoor track, swimming and diving, baseball, lacrosse, soccer, softball, volleyball, and tennis.

=== State Championships ===
In 2019, the school's girls' basketball team won the 6A state championship, and in 2023 the school's boys cross country team won the 6A state championship.

== Notable alumni ==
- Hala Ayala, politician
- Joey Cook, contestant of American Idol XIV
- Russell Davis, former NFL football player
- Kyre Duplessis, NFL wide receiver
- Cerina Fairfax, dentist and Second Lady of Virginia
- Da'Shawn Hand, NFL football player
- R. Alan King, U.S. Army veteran and author
- Matt Lehr, former NFL football player
- Tony Lilly, former NFL football player
- Kris McCray, former MMA fighter
- Raphiael Putney, professional basketball player
- Tommy Richman singer and rapper
- Alex Taylor, distance runner

== See also ==
- Official Website
- Prince William County Public Schools
- Woodbridge High School Profile
- Woodbridge High School Data
