= Patriot High School =

Patriot High School may refer to:

- Patriot High School (California), located in Riverside, California
- Patriot High School (Virginia), Prince William County, Virginia
