= Gainesville High School =

Gainesville High School is the name of several high schools in the United States:

- Gainesville High School (Florida)
- Gainesville High School (Georgia)
- Gainesville High School (Missouri), Gainesville, Missouri
- Gainesville High School (Texas)
- Gainesville High School (Virginia)
