= Da'Shawn Hand =

American football player (born 1995)

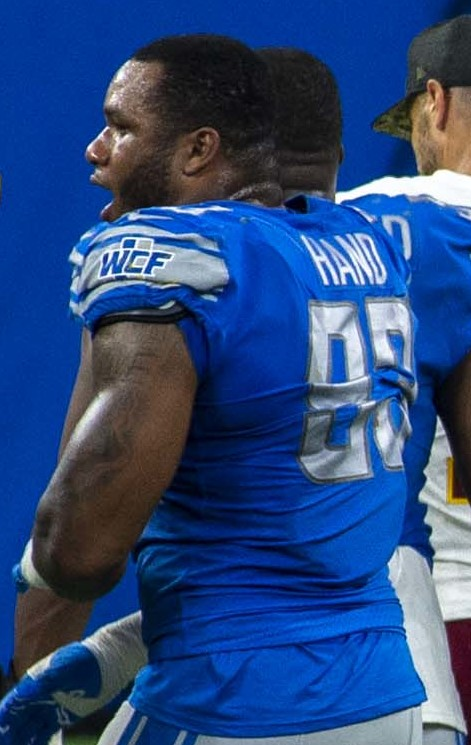
- Hand with the Detroit Lions in 2020

No. 90 – Atlanta Falcons
- Position: Defensive tackle
- Roster status: Injured reserve

Personal information
- Born: November 14, 1995 (age 30); Philadelphia, Pennsylvania, U.S.
- Listed height: 6 ft 3 in (1.91 m)
- Listed weight: 302 lb (137 kg)

Career information
- High school: Woodbridge (VA)
- College: Alabama (2014–2017)
- NFL draft: 2018: 4th round, 114th overall pick

Career history
- Detroit Lions (2018–2021); Indianapolis Colts (2021)*; Tennessee Titans (2021–2022); Miami Dolphins (2023–2024); Los Angeles Chargers (2025); Atlanta Falcons (2026–present)
- * Offseason or practice squad member only

Awards and highlights
- PFWA All-Rookie Team (2018); 2× CFP national champion (2015, 2017); 2× Second-team All-SEC (2016, 2017)

Career NFL statistics as of 2025
- Total tackles: 131
- Sacks: 6.5
- Forced fumbles: 4
- Fumble recoveries: 2
- Pass deflections: 9
- Interceptions: 1
- Stats at Pro Football Reference

Da'Shawn Hand (born November 14, 1995) is an American professional football defensive tackle for the Atlanta Falcons of the National Football League (NFL). He played college football for the Alabama Crimson Tide.

== Early life ==
Hand was born in Philadelphia; his father is Sharif Hand, who was a junior in high school when Da'Shawn was born. Hand's uncle, Damone Boone, was a Parade All-American running back at West Springfield High School in West Springfield, Virginia, in the mid-1990s.

After moving to Woodbridge, Virginia, Hand attended Woodbridge High School, where he was a three-sport athlete in football, wrestling and track. In football, he was an All-State defensive lineman. In his junior year, Hand recorded 110 tackles, 16 sacks, 40 tackles for loss, two pass deflections, four forced fumbles, and three fumble recoveries. Woodbridge finished the season 6–5, losing 0–17 to Haymarket Battlefield in the first round of the VHSL playoffs. After his junior year, Hand was named Rivals.com Junior of the Year, an honor that comes along with being rated the No. 1 prospect of one's class entering senior season. Media attention steadily increased, and The Washington Post made Hand the subject of a documentary series named First and 17, which followed him both on and off the field, "giving an inside look at the challenges facing a top recruit juggling school, football and his senior year".

In addition to playing football, Hand also excelled in wrestling and track. He was a regional champion in Virginia wrestling. In track & field, he competed primarily as a thrower, but also spend some time as a sprinter during his final year in 2014. At the Runner Store City-County Championships, he earned a second-place finish in the shot put event, recording a career-best throw of 15.81 meters (51 ft, 9 in). He placed 11th in the discus at the Gojekian Twilight Classic, notching a top-throw of 35.66 meters (116 ft, 9 in). In sprints, he clocked a 12.24-second 100-meter dash time at the 2014 Garfield Meet, where he took 7th. He ran a 4.7-second 40-yard dash and had a 33-inch vertical jump.

=== Recruiting ===
Hand was considered the nation's best recruit in the 2014 class by Rivals.com. In 2012, he was the Rivals High School Football Junior of the Year. With over 90 scholarship offers, Hand narrowed down his choice of college destination to three—Alabama, Florida, and Michigan—before the start of his senior season. On November 14, 2013, his eighteenth birthday, he committed to attend the University of Alabama. Eyeing a civil engineering major, Hand cited Alabama's civil engineering program as one of the key reasons he chose the Crimson Tide.

== College career ==
Hand attended Alabama from 2014–2017 under head coach Nick Saban. In his true freshman year at Alabama, Hand was a regular in the Crimson Tide defensive line rotation and played in nine games at defensive end. He started his college career with one solo tackle against West Virginia. Hand finished with seven tackles on the year, including four solo stops and two sacks (−10 yards). Hand started nine of the 11 games he played in 2017, missing time with a minor knee injury. He had 27 tackles, 3.5 tackles for loss, and three sacks in the season.

=== Collegiate statistics ===
Da'Shawn Hand						Tackles					Interceptions					Fumbles			
Year	School	Conf	Class	Pos	G	Solo	Ast	Tot	Loss	Sk	Int	Yds	Avg	TD	PD	FR	Yds	TD	FF
2014	Alabama	SEC	FR	DL	6	4	3	7	2.0	2.0	0	0		0	0	0			0
2015	Alabama	SEC	SO	DL	8	7	9	16	6.5	3.0	0	0		0	0	0			0
2016	Alabama	SEC	JR	DL	10	10	11	21	2.5	1.0	0	0		0	0	0			1
2017	Alabama	SEC	SR	DL	10	9	18	27	3.5	3.0	0	0		0	1	0			0
Career	Alabama					30	41	71	14.5	9.0	0	0		0	1	0			1

== Professional career ==
Pre-draft measurables
Height	Weight	Arm length	Hand span	Wingspan	40-yard dash	10-yard split	20-yard split	20-yard shuttle	Three-cone drill	Vertical jump	Broad jump	Bench press
6 ft 3 5/8 in (1.92 m)	297 lb (135 kg)	34 3/8 in (0.87 m)	9 3/4 in (0.25 m)	6 ft 8 5/8 in (2.05 m)	4.83 s	1.70 s	2.85 s	4.62 s	7.98 s	31.5 in (0.80 m)	9 ft 3 in (2.82 m)	28 reps
All values from NFL Combine

=== Detroit Lions ===
Hand was selected by the Detroit Lions in the fourth round (114th overall) of the 2018 NFL draft. He made his professional debut in the Lions' season opener against the New York Jets. In Week 4, against the Dallas Cowboys, he recorded his first professional sack. In the following game, he was able to record another sack in the victory against the Green Bay Packers. He was placed on injured reserve on December 18, 2018. He was named to the PFWA All-Rookie Team.

The 2019 season was an injury riddled sophomore season for Hand. He suffered an elbow injury early in training camp and missed the first six weeks of the regular season. He returned for two weeks, then suffered an ankle injury in Week 9 and missed the next three games. He returned in Week 13, but suffered a setback with the ankle injury and was placed on injured reserve on December 12, 2019.

In 2020, Hand was relegated to a backup role, playing in about 50% of the total defensive snaps while only starting one game of 10 games played. He missed three games early in the season with a groin injury, then suffered an ankle injury in Week 14. He was placed on injured reserve on December 19, 2020.

On September 2, 2021, Hand was placed on injured reserve. He was activated on October 30. He was placed back on injured reserve on November 23, ending his season. He was released on November 30.

=== Indianapolis Colts ===
On December 21, 2021, Hand was signed to the Indianapolis Colts' practice squad. He was released on December 31.

=== Tennessee Titans ===
On January 5, 2022, Hand was signed to the Tennessee Titans practice squad. On February 15, Hand signed a reserve/future contract with the Titans. He was placed on injured reserve on September 13.

=== Miami Dolphins ===
On August 6, 2023, Hand signed with the Miami Dolphins. He was released on August 29 and re-signed to the practice squad. Hand was promoted to the active roster on September 16.

On March 18, 2024, Hand re-signed with the Dolphins.

=== Los Angeles Chargers ===
On March 13, 2025, Hand signed with the Los Angeles Chargers on a one-year, $3.35 million contract. After suffering a groin injury in Week 5 against the Washington Commanders, Hand was placed on injured reserve on October 11. He was activated on November 8, ahead of the team's Week 10 matchup against the Pittsburgh Steelers.

=== Atlanta Falcons ===
On March 16, 2026, Hand signed a one-year, $3 million contract with the Atlanta Falcons. On September 16, Hand was placed on season-ending injured reserve after suffering a quad injury during the team's season opener against the Pittsburgh Steelers.

== NFL career statistics ==
Legend
**Bold**	Career high

=== Regular season ===
Year	Team	Games		Tackles					Interceptions						Fumbles				
Year	Team	GP	GS	Cmb	Solo	Ast	Sck	TFL	Int	Yds	Avg	Lng	TD	PD	FF	Fum	FR	Yds	TD
2018	DET	13	8	27	**22**	5	**3.0**	4	0	0	0.0	0	0	0	**2**	0	**1**	0	0
2019	DET	3	2	6	4	2	0.0	1	0	0	0.0	0	0	1	0	0	0	0	0
2020	DET	10	1	19	12	7	0.0	1	0	0	0.0	0	0	0	1	0	0	0	0
2021	DET	3	0	2	1	1	0.0	0	0	0	0.0	0	0	1	0	0	0	0	0
2021	TEN	1	0	0	0	0	0.0	0	0	0	0.0	0	0	0	0	0	0	0	0
2022	TEN	1	0	0	0	0	0.0	0	0	0	0.0	0	0	0	0	0	0	0	0
2023	MIA	16	0	17	6	**11**	1.0	1	0	0	0.0	0	0	2	0	0	0	0	0
2024	MIA	**17**	2	**31**	20	**11**	1.0	**5**	0	0	0.0	0	0	1	1	0	**1**	0	0
2025	LAC	13	**13**	29	18	**11**	1.5	**5**	**1**	**7**	**7.0**	**7**	0	**4**	0	**1**	0	0	0
2026	ATL	1	0	0	0	0	0.0	0	0	0	0.0	0	0	0	0	0	0	0	0
Career		78	26	131	83	48	6.5	17	1	7	7.0	7	0	9	4	1	2	0	0

=== Postseason ===
Year	Team	Games		Tackles					Interceptions						Fumbles				
Year	Team	GP	GS	Cmb	Solo	Ast	Sck	TFL	Int	Yds	Avg	Lng	TD	PD	FF	Fum	FR	Yds	TD
2023	MIA	**1**	0	**3**	**1**	**2**	0.0	0	0	0	0.0	0	0	0	0	0	**1**	**1**	0
2025	LAC	**1**	**1**	1	0	1	0.0	0	0	0	0.0	0	0	0	0	0	**1**	0	0
Career		2	1	4	1	3	0.0	0	0	0	0.0	0	0	0	0	0	2	1	0

== Personal life ==
Hand has one daughter.
