= 1958 All-Southern Conference football team =

The 1958 All-Southern Conference football team consists of American football players chosen by the Associated Press (AP) and United Press (UP) for the All-Southern Conference football team for the 1958 college football season.

== All-Southern Conference selections ==
=== Backs ===
- Bill Holsclaw, Virginia Tech (AP-1; UPI-1)
- Dick Longfellow, West Virginia (AP-1; UPI-1)
- Sam Horner, VMI (AP-1; UPI-1)
- Mel Reight, West Virginia (AP-1; UPI-2)
- Pete Johnson, VMI (AP-2; UPI-1)
- Ted Colna, George Washington (AP-2; UPI-2)
- Charlie Benson, Davidson (AP-2)
- Buddy Davis, Richmond (AP-2)
- Ray Peterson, West Virginia (UPI-2)
- Len Rubal, William & Mary (UPI-2)

=== Ends ===
- Carroll Dale, Virginia Tech (AP-1; UPI-1)
- Terry Fairbanks, West Virginia (AP-1; UPI-1)
- Joe Biscaha, Richmond (AP-2; UPI-2)
- Ray Siminski, Furman (AP-2)
- Paul Maguire, The Citadel (UPI-2)

=== Tackles ===
- Jim McFalls, VMI (AP-1; UPI-1)
- Ed Rutsch, George Washington (AP-1; UPI-2)
- Elliott Schaubach, William & Mary (AP-2; UPI-1)
- Jim Burks, Virginia Tech (AP-2)
- Dick Guesman, West Virginia (UPI-2)
- Mike Zeno, Virginia Tech (UPI-2)

=== Guards ===
- Bill Lopasky, West Virginia (AP-1; UPI-1)
- Bob Frulla, George Washington (AP-1; UPI-2)
- Dick Cleveland, The Citadel (AP-2; UPI-1)
- Nick Ruffin, VMI (AP-2)

=== Centers ===
- Jerry Borst, VMI (AP-1; UPI-1)
- Nick Mihalas, Virginia Tech (AP-2; UPI-2)

== Key ==
AP = Associated Press

UPI = United Press International

== See also ==
- 1958 College Football All-America Team
