= Battlefield High School =

Coordinates: 38.844755°N 77.633321°W

Location
- 15000 Graduation Drive; Haymarket, Virginia 20169

Information
- Type: Public
- Motto: Success Is A Choice
- Founded: 2004
- School district: Prince William County Public Schools
- Principal: DeLores Lucas
- Teaching staff: 139.25 (on an FTE basis)
- Grades: 9-12
- Enrollment: 2,322 (2022–23)
- Student to teacher ratio: 16.68
- Colors: Purple; Black; Silver
- Athletics conference: AAA Cedar Run District; AAA Northwest Region
- Mascot: Bobcat
- Newspaper: Inside 15000
- Website: battlefieldhs.pwcs.edu

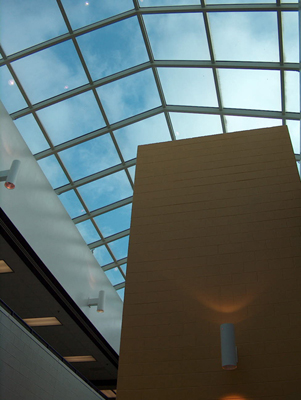
The atrium in the central stairwell.

BHS' location and the area it serves.

Battlefield High School is a public high school within the Gainesville District of unincorporated Prince William County, Virginia, United States, and is part of the Prince William County Public Schools. The school is located north of the town of Haymarket bearing a "Haymarket, Virginia" address. Battlefield is one of two Centers for Information Technology in the school division. In the 2010-2011 football season Battlefield's team won the Cedar Run District Title, Northwest Region Title, and the AAA Division 6 State Title.

== Communities served ==
The rapid construction of homes in the area surrounding Battlefield has resulted in a tremendous population increase, which guaranteed that for years, the school would operate well over its intended capacity. A quick glance in the building during operating hours made it clear that overcrowding was a considerable issue despite the building of Patriot High School nearby in 2011, and some students and parents even considered the overcrowding a danger.

In fall 2021, Prince William County opened a new Gainesville High School in nearby Gainesville, Virginia to assist with overcrowding. Communities served by Battlefield include Bull Run Mountain Estates, Carterwood, Catharpin, Crossroads, Dominion Valley, Evergreen, Greenhill Crossing, Heritage Hunt, Piedmont, Rocky Run, Oak Valley, Stony Branch Crossing, Villages of Piedmont, and Westmarket.

== Administration ==
The principal of Battlefield High School is Delores Lucas. Prior to coming to the school, Lucas was an assistant principal at Patriot High School. she also was an English teacher at Patriot.

== History ==
Battlefield High School was opened in September 2004 as the ninth high school in Prince William County.

=== Programs of study ===
Battlefield High School is a Center for Information Technology, and includes limited computer-based and computer-related coursework. Enrollment in the "iT" program is optional for both Battlefield students and for those who are zone-designated for other PWCS high schools. The program has several branches consisting of Graphic Design, Networking, Programming, and Hardware support.

In 2006–2007, the school began hosting its Air Force JROTC program. It is a federal program authorized under United States Code, Title 10, Sections 2031-2033, and the ROTC Revitalization Act of 1964 and mandates that all participating cadets be volunteers. There is no military service obligation associated with participation, but cadets who participate for at least three years, and are subsequently recommended by the Senior Air Science Instructor, may earn accelerated promotions in the active duty military. These programs vary depending on the branch of service and experience level of the cadet. The program is renowned, and according to faculty, students, and parents alike, their accolades are well-deserved. Day to day operations are led by a cadet staff composed of seniors, with a senior 4th-year AFJROTC cadet leading each class under the supervision of the faculty instructor. The curriculum is set by the Air Force and includes a 40% breakout of Air Science classes, 40% in leadership and character development, and 20% personal wellness (fitness and nutrition). All extracurricular activities are led by cadets, including drill team, rocketry club, Academic Bowl, and the Raider team (a form of field skills and physical fitness competition). Additionally, the cadets field their own CyberPatriot team to compete in the yearly competitions sponsored by the Air Force Association. By Headquarters AFJROTC directives, the cadet corps must number no less than 100 cadets based on Battlefield's total number of students, and no more than 180 cadets, based on PWCS authorized instructor staffing. Since the 2010-2011 school year, cadet enrollment has stabilized at roughly 150 cadets each year. Battlefield's program earned the AFJROTC Distinguished Unit Award (with Merit) in 2011, the Distinguished Unit Award in 2012, and after a brief hiatus of unit accolades, received the Outstanding Organization Award in 2017. For the 2016-2017 school year, they performed over 1,400 hours of community service in and around Haymarket and participated in 43 color guards for local organizations.

In 2007–2008, the school began hosting its Criminal Justice program which serves as a "mini police academy," instructing essential constitutional law and criminal justice practices.

=== Student performance ===
Battlefield High School has been named a "School of Excellence" by Prince William County four times. According to PWCS, "a School of Excellence must be fully accredited by the state and ... must ensure that ninety-five percent of students beginning the year on or above grade level pass the SOL tests. They must also ensure that fifty percent of students beginning the year below grade level pass the SOL tests.".

During the 2016, Battlefield's median SAT scores exceeded the county and the state's median scores significantly. The AP participation rate is 66% at BHS.

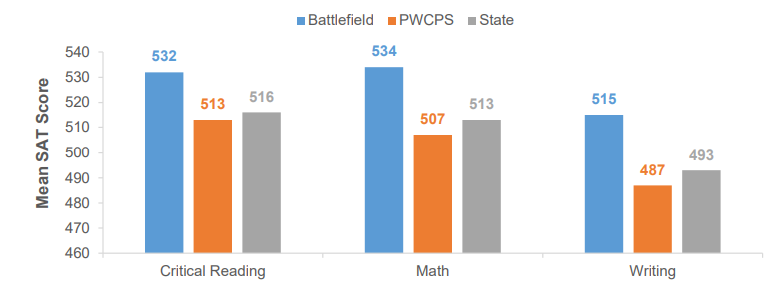

==== Accreditation ====
Battlefield High School has been a fully accredited high school based on its performance on the Standards of Learning tests in Virginia since its opening in 2004.

==== Ranking ====
US News has ranked Battlefield High School as the Number 1 high school in the Prince William County System for several years. Additionally, the school has been ranked as Number 18 in the state as well as Number 833 nationally in 2021 out of 17,857 high schools nationwide. BHS has performed exceptionally well against regional schools such as Briar Woods High School, traditionally seen as Loudoun County's premier high school which was ranked at Number 20 in the state and Number 1 in Loudoun County.

==== No Child Left Behind (NCLB) ====
Battlefield High School has made "Adequate Yearly Progress" (AYP) each year it has been open, according to the Virginia Department of Education's benchmarks set by the mandate of the No Child Left Behind Act.

=== School seal ===
The school seal, illustrated in the school colors of purple, black, and silver, was designed by Carl Kielbasa of Herff-Jones, Inc. The center of the seal is a representation of "graduation" with the traditional mortarboard and rolled diploma. Around the outside of the seal are representations of "the arts" (a drama mask, a lyre, and a palette), "academics" (the traditional "torch and tome"), "Information Technology" (the words wrapping the globe), and "athletics" (the winged shoe of Hermes (stylized as a modern sneaker) and the traditional laurel). The crest of the seal is a disembodied Bobcat head superimposed upon mountains, representing the Piedmont region of the Appalachian Mountains, a prominent local geographic feature. At the base of the seal on the tasseled scroll are the keywords "Courage," "Honor," and "Integrity."

=== Controversies ===
In March 2011, the students protested against Prince William County Student Dress and Appearance code banning "excessively tight and form fitting" clothing.

In December 2010, Battlefield High School made headlines after a candy cane food fight broke out before class. The students held responsible were part of the "Christmas Sweater Club," a group created to spread holiday cheer in the hallways. However, after the Christmas Sweater Club brought bags of candy canes to school one morning, chaos erupted as several students reported to have been hit in the head by flying candy canes. The students in the club were disciplined with two hours of detention, but parents protested that this was unfair punishment.

=== Campus ===
Battlefield High School, exterior.

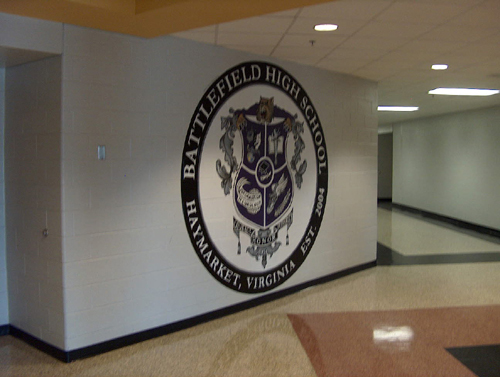
The school seal, painted in the foyer.

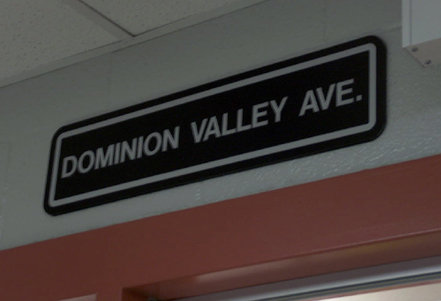
An interior "road sign".

Originally simply "High School #9," the campus includes one primary academic building, a separate security residence, an observation tower overlooking the large student parking lot, and the athletic stadium complex. (Battlefield Athletic Stadium) Located on Graduation Drive, the school is within the Dominion Valley subdivision. The academic facility ("the school") is approximately 276,000 square feet (25,600 m^{2}) in size, is located on a 79.77-acre (322,800 m^{2}) site, and was designed by Moseley Architects, formerly Moseley Wilkins, and Wood. Construction took place beginning in March 2002, with the facility opening on August 19, 2004. Battlefield High School shares a common design with C.D. Hylton High School, Forest Park High School, and Freedom High School. This "class" of high school designs has been retired as of 2011.

Many of the interior trim aspects were originally painted a salmon color, but after the selection of the school colors (purple, black, and silver), many trim sections were repainted in school colors. The floors of the school feature black tile borders along wall edges and school-colored purple lockers, configured "over-under" to provide two lockers per bay. The walls are white and power-efficient fluorescent lighting is used throughout. However, the building's lackluster design only provides natural light through few windows on the outside. An atrium at the center of the school is a functional architectural detail that creates the largest source of natural light in the building. In Summer of 2009, much of the interior trim of the school, some of which was still salmon in color since the original opening of the building, was repainted in matching Battlefield purple.

During Summer 2008, three years of effort by the Technology Committee, in tandem with the Office of Instructional Technology and support from the administration, led to the installation of ceiling-mounted DLP video projectors for use in classroom teaching in almost every instructional space, with the remainder placed in the following school years as budget allowed. "Smartboards" are also scattered throughout the building.

As is common practice with many modern schools, corridors are labeled with "road signs," helping students to navigate the large structure. At Battlefield, "east-west" roads are numbered First, Second, and Third streets on the ground level, beginning closest to the front of the school. On the upper level, Fourth and Fifth streets follow the same pattern. "North-south" corridors are "avenues," each beginning with an ascending letter of the alphabet and each named for something relevant to Battlefield's community. "Antioch Avenue" is the first on the ground floor, followed by "Bristow," "Catharpin," and "Dominion Valley" Avenues. On the upper floor, "Evergreen, "Freedom," "Gainesville," and "Haymarket" Avenues complete the grid.

Further identifying monikers for exterior routes were published in 2007 as part of a revised traffic pattern plan. The high volume of traffic on Graduation Drive and Route 15 has been concern not only for the school but for the local department of transportation as well. (According to an administration comment during a faculty meeting, BHS school officials counted over 1,300 automobiles passing through the campus during a single morning in September.) Several of the exterior roads carry the unofficial names "Bobcat Trail," "Senior Drive," and "Spirit Way." The school itself has only one exit accommodating the upwards of 1,300 automobiles, creating a traffic jam each day that sometimes lasts up to two hours.

The on-paper capacity of the school is 2,053.

(*) – Approximate figure (**) – Due to temporary classrooms ("trailers")

Dropout rates have been less than 2% since the school opened in 2004.

== Demographics ==
In the 2022–2023 school year, Battlefield's student body was:

- 57.1% White
- 13.4% Hispanic
- 13.0% Asian
- 8,7% Black
- 7.2% Two or More Races
- 0.4% Native Hawaiian/Pacific Islander
- 0.2% American Indian/Alaskan

== Faculty and staff ==
Battlefield High School employs over 250 total staff members, approximately 190 of whom are members of the instructional faculty with another dozen serving as paraprofessionals. The counseling center employs approximately 20 people.

There are currently several committees operating at the school, including the Freshman Transition Committee, the Technology Committee, the Social Committee, the Principal's Advisory Council, and the STAR Program Committee.

The iT Medal, featuring the logo for the Center for Information Technology.

== Curriculum ==
Battlefield offers a county wide IT-specialized program for qualified students. The program offers courses in computer science and programming, as well as advanced certification programs including A+, Oracle, Cisco, Microsoft Certified Systems, and is a certification center for the Certified Internet Web Professional program.

In 2006, the Virginia Department of Education conferred an award upon the iT team of business partners for collaboration between the iT program at Battlefield and local industry.

== Extracurricular and cocurricular activities ==
Battlefield Bobcats logo.

The school mascot is the bobcat and the sports teams currently play in the AAA Cedar Run District and Northwest Region.

The athletic team logo for Battlefield is a reproduction of the logo used by the Charlotte Bobcats NBA team.

According to members of the original school naming committee, the mascot "Cannons" was seriously considered but ultimately lost to "Bobcats."

=== Extracurricular accomplishments ===
Battlefield Orchestras have consistently earned top honors at district assessment, with the top group earning straight superiors and "A's" in all subcategories in the 2014 assessment at Patriot High School. In addition to being the school sending the largest delegation of musicians to honors groups such as the North Central Virginia Regional Orchestra, the Battlefield Orchestras have earned awards in statewide competitions, including top instrumental honors at the 2014 Music in the Parks Competition in Williamsburg, Virginia. The Battlefield Band is a Virginia Honor Band, and is affiliated with the Virginia Band and Orchestra Director's Association, or VBODA. The marching band has received a 'Superior' rating, or the highest rating possible, at the VBODA marching festivals from 2008-2013. The Marching Bobcats also took first place in their band class of AAA at the 2007 All State Sugar Bowl marching competition in New Orleans, Loisianna ( the band class refers to the size of the band, or how many students are in it, and the measurements used to define each class changes every year). The marching band also received 'Outstanding' ratings, the highest ratings possible, at the 2009 Champs Sports Bowl in Orlando, Florida. The Battlefield High School Marching Band is also the 2012 National Champions, receiving this title after traveling to the 2012 BCS Nation Championships in New Orleans, Louisiana.

In 2010, the football team won their first state title for any sport in school history.

In 2013, the boys' cross country team took third place at the State Championship Meet, and the following year took fourth place. The fourth-place finish in 2014, was heartbreaking since the boys only lost to first place by a mere four points, and lost a tiebreaker for third place.

In 2013, the girls' soccer team took second in the State Championship game. Junior, Sydney Sisk had the only goal of the game for Battlefield High School. In 2014, the girls were able to finally take home a State Title. In 2015, the girls took home the State Title for a second time. For the third consecutive year, the girl's varsity soccer team earned the State Title with a final score of 4-0, trumping Cox High School. The team has also won six consecutive regional championships.

The girls lacrosse team has made it to the state playoffs in 2022-2024. In that span they have finished second in the state twice and lost in the semifinals to the eventually state champions in 2024.

Battlefield's FIRST Robotics Competition team, was founded in 2006 and has the support of mentors and teachers who help the students get as much hands on experience as possible. In the year on 2011-2012 Robotics was moved into the classroom(making Battlefield the first team in Prince William County to attempt such an undertaking) and will compete with 9 teams. Currently the teams are divided into two classes; one class plans on participating in FIRST Tech Challenge until the FRC division starts while the other plans on participating in FTC full-time this year. The class is being taught by the Robotics team mentor Gail Drake and Battlefield High School's IT teacher Rebecca Conner. In the 2011-2012 school year, Battlefield's FIRST Tech Challenge team reached 1st place at the FIRST Championship and reached the semi-finals of the FIRST Championship for FIRST Robotics Competition.

== Graduation traditions ==
Following suit with other PWCS schools, Battlefield began holding graduation at nearby Jiffy Lube Live (formerly known as Nissan Pavilion) for the 2007 commencement exercises. However, it is now hosted at EagleBank Arena.

== Other photographs ==
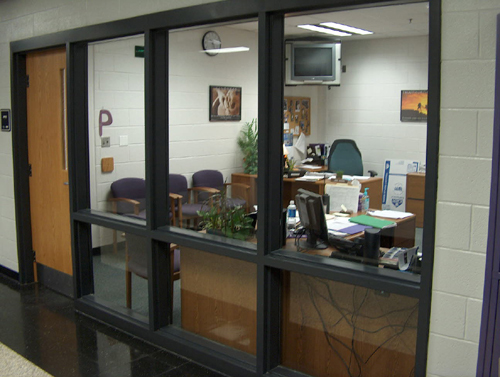
The "satellite" office, home to several Assistant Principals.

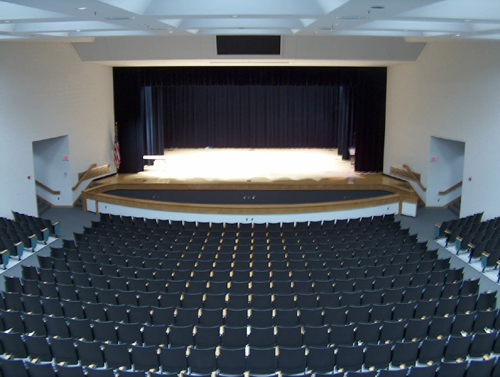
The 835-seat auditorium.

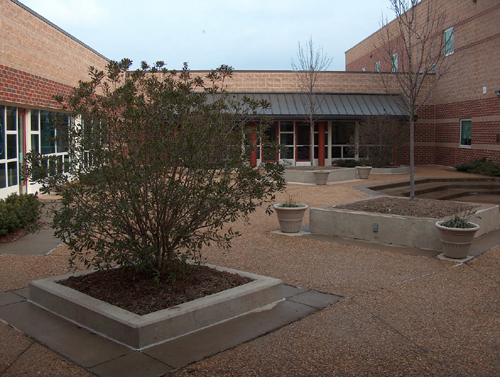
The courtyard in February.

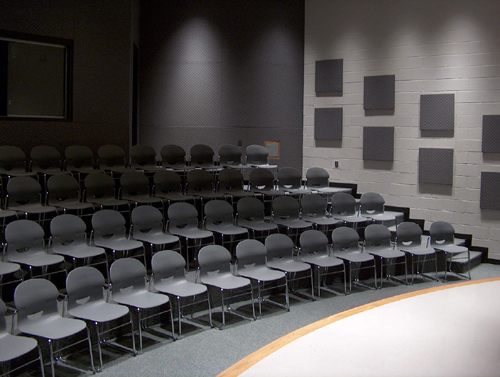
The "mini theatre," seating nearly 80.

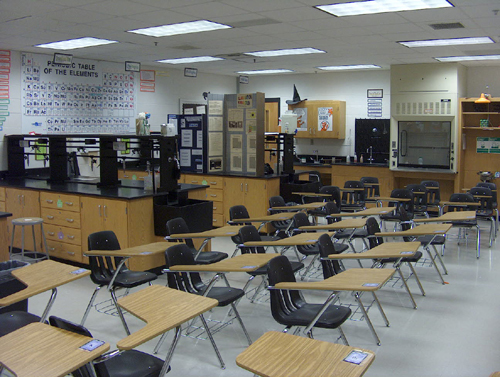
A science classroom.

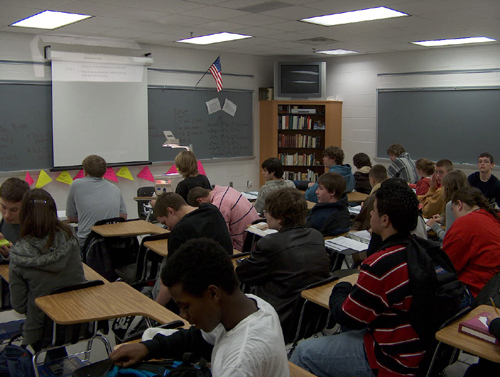
A language arts classroom.

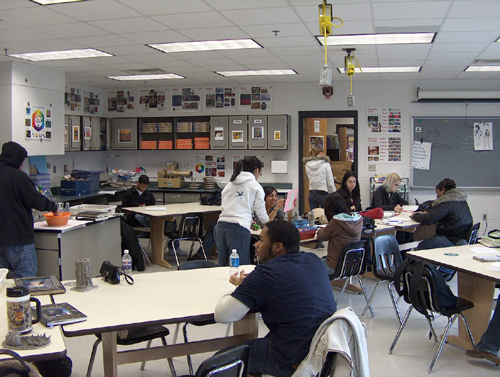
A visual arts classroom.

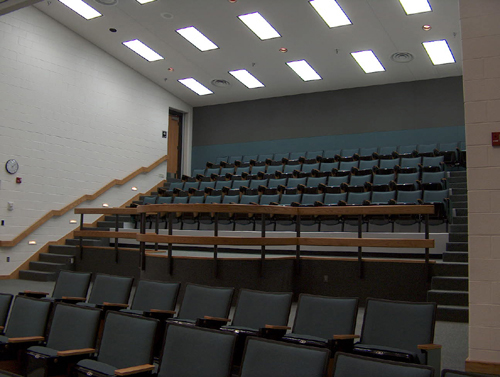
Lecture Two, one of the large seminar spaces at Battlefield.

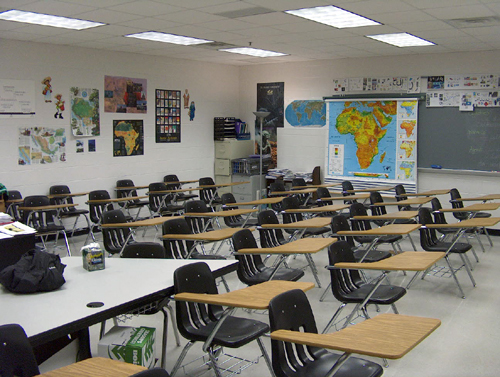
A social studies classroom.

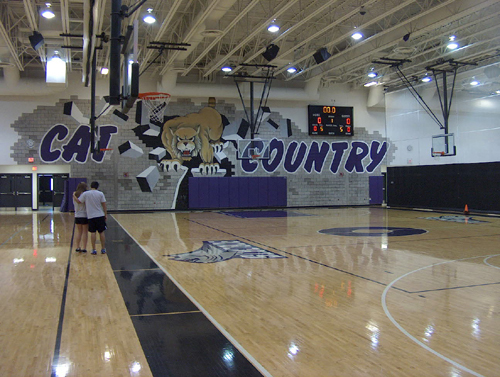
Gymnasium interior.

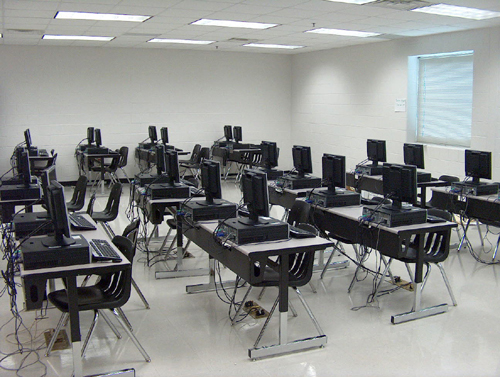
One of many computer labs in the facility.

== Notable alumni ==
- Christian Parker (2009), NCAA and NFL football coach
- Lauren Hoffman (2017), Olympic hurdler and sprinter, represents Philippines internationally
- Zach Agnos (2019), MLB baseball player
- Ryan Coll (2019), NFL football player
- Josh Oduro (2019 - transferred), professional basketball player
- Carleigh Frilles (2020), professional soccer player, represents Philippines internationally
- Wesley Williams (2022), NFL football player
- Caleb Woodson (2023), college football linebacker for the Alabama Crimson Tide
- Sarah Everhardt (2025), professional figure skater

== See also ==
- Prince William County Public Schools
