= Independent Hill School =

Coordinates: 38°37′58.53″N 77°26′12.99″W

Location
- 14780 Joplin Road; Manassas (address), Virginia 20112

Information
- Funding type: Public
- Motto: Building a Better World One Student at a Time
- Founded: 2004
- School district: Prince William County Schools
- School number: (703) 791-8150
- Principal: Jodi Pankowski
- Enrollment: 32
- Colors: Red and White
- Mascot: Horse (Colts)
- Website: http://independenthill.schools.pwcs.edu/

Independent Hill School is a special education school within Prince William County Public Schools. The facility serves special needs students from kindergarten to age 22 throughout the county.

Located on a former Air Force radar station that was deeded to the county, the school is named for the area, Independent Hill. The school is located adjacent to the densely populated administrative complex and about half a mile from the Edward Kelly Leadership Center.

Students enrolled at Independent Hill engage in a specialized curriculum that provides both academic and vocational instruction. Students are able to participate in a variety of programs, including the management of an on-site food service establishment, an on-site commercial kitchen, a full laundry, institutional and custodial services, adaptive physical education, an on-site commercial greenhouse, school-work programs, and an equestrian facility with barn and horses.

Academic and vocational instruction are stated by the district to include technology, modeling, logical thinking, workshops, community job site instruction, and work with support specialists. Physical training include sports and leisure activities, self-help, and regular participation in the Special Olympics.

The trophy case at the front of the school features several awards from the Special Olympics, conferred upon Independent Hill School students throughout their years of participation.

Additionally, the school's mission statement states that it provides methods to stimulate emotional well-being, such as the teaching of respect for self and others, the development of health self-esteem, enhanced coping mechanisms, and adaptability to change.

On April 2, 2018 students and staff moved to the new building that now houses PACE East, New Directions, And New Dominion Alternative Education Center called Independence Nontraditional School. After the move, the older building that originally housed the PACE East students, was torn down.

== See also ==
- Prince William County Public Schools
