= Brandon Hogan =

American football player (born 1988)

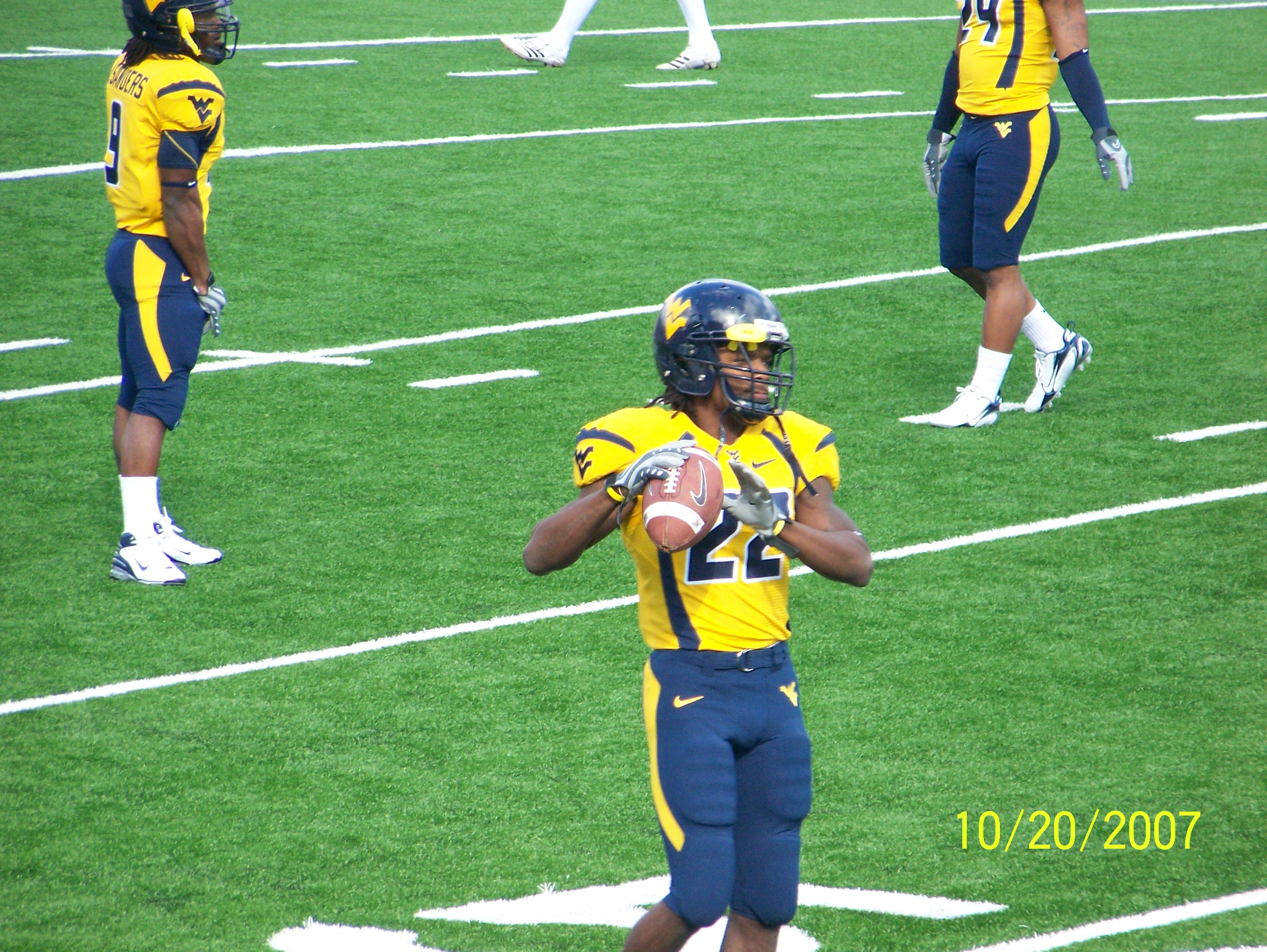
- Hogan with the West Virginia Mountaineers in 2007

No. 21
- Position: Defensive back

Personal information
- Born: April 1, 1988 (age 38); Manassas, Virginia, U.S.
- Listed height: 5 ft 10 in (1.78 m)
- Listed weight: 190 lb (86 kg)

Career information
- High school: Osbourn (Manassas)
- College: West Virginia
- NFL draft: 2011: 4th round, 98th overall pick

Career history
- Carolina Panthers (2011–2012); Winnipeg Blue Bombers (2014)

Awards and highlights
- Second-team All-Big East (2010)

Career NFL statistics
- Total tackles: 3
- Stats at Pro Football Reference

Brandon Hogan (born April 1, 1988) is an American former professional football player who was a defensive back for the Carolina Panthers of the National Football League (NFL). He played college football for the West Virginia Mountaineers. He was selected by the Panthers in the fourth round of the 2011 NFL draft.

== Early life ==
Brandon Hogan played football at Osbourn High School, where he began to earn respect on the collegiate recruiting scene. As a junior, Hogan passed for 2,045 yards and 18 touchdown, totaling 3,183 yards and 36 touchdowns on the season. In his senior season, Hogan passed for 2,430 yards and rushed for 1,781 yards with 59 total touchdowns as he led Osbourn to an undefeated AAA Division 6 State Championship. Hogan was named All-Metro by The Washington Post and all-state his senior year.

On the recruiting scene, Hogan was offered scholarships by West Virginia University, University of Kentucky, Marshall University, University of Maryland, University of Virginia, and Virginia Tech. Hogan was projected as a cornerback, rather than a quarterback. After a February 2 visit, Hogan chose to accept the scholarship offer at West Virginia.

== College career ==
=== Freshman season ===
After enrolling at West Virginia University in 2007, Hogan was projected as a defensive back on the team's roster. However, Hogan played slot receiver for his debut season. Hogan grabbed 12 receptions on the season for 67 yards, a 5.6 yard per catch average. Hogan saw action on more than 225 plays during the season, including a season-high 55 plays against ECU. In that game, Hogan recorded a season-high six receptions for 44 yards.

=== Sophomore season ===
Hogan began spring practices in April 2008 with an impressive performance in the team's first scrimmage. In the scrimmage, Hogan totaled a team-best six catches for 67 yards and a score and also rushed for a touchdown as he finished with 82 all-purpose yards and two touchdowns. In the Gold & Blue Spring Game on April 19, Hogan led all receivers with 6 receptions for 49 yards. However, as fall practice began Hogan made the transition from receiver to cornerback, the position he was projected to play when he arrived at West Virginia as a freshman.

Hogan saw his first career start at cornerback in the 27–3 victory over Marshall, in which he recorded four tackles and recovered a fumble. In the 24–17 victory over Rutgers, Hogan had 5 tackles in his second start at corner. Then in the win over Syracuse, Hogan had 4 tackles. Hogan followed-up the Syracuse game with 3 tackles in the 34–17 win over Auburn.

In the 35–13 win over Connecticut, Hogan had 3 tackles, a fumble recovery, and two interceptions for a total of 50 return yards. The interceptions were Hogan's first of his career. In the following 26–23 loss in overtime to Cincinnati, Hogan was second on the team with 9 tackles and two pass break-ups. In the 13–7 victory in the USF season finale, Hogan led the team with 9 tackles. However, he missed the Meineke Car Care Bowl victory over North Carolina due to a personal illness issue. Various players honored Hogan during the game, while the team held up Hogan's #22 jersey before the game.

Hogan finished his first season at cornerback as a sophomore with 60 tackles, 3 interceptions, seven pass breakups, two fumble recoveries, and two forced fumbles. Hogan played in 12 games and started 9 on the year; he tied for the team lead in interceptions and sixth on the team in tackles. Hogan earned WVU's Defensive Champion honors four times and the Special Teams Champion honor once.

Hogan was suspended indefinitely from the team on September 12, 2010, following a drunk driving arrest in Morgantown.

== Professional career ==
Pre-draft measurables
Height	Weight	Arm length	Hand span	Wingspan	Bench press
5 ft 10 1/4 in (1.78 m)	192 lb (87 kg)	30 3/8 in (0.77 m)	9 5/8 in (0.24 m)	5 ft 11 7/8 in (1.83 m)	19 reps
All values from NFL Combine

Hogan was selected 98th overall in the fourth round of the 2011 NFL draft by the Carolina Panthers. He was placed on the Physically Unable to Perform list because of his knee injury, but was taken off the list and added to the 53-man roster on November 8, 2011.

On October 29, 2012, the Carolina Panthers cut ties with Brandon Hogan, waiving him off injured reserve.

On April 8, 2014, Hogan signed with the Winnipeg Blue Bombers of the Canadian Football League.
