= Matt Lehr =

American football player (born 1979)

No. 68, 61
- Position: Guard / Center

Personal information
- Born: April 25, 1979 (age 47); Jacksonville, Florida, U.S.
- Listed height: 6 ft 2 in (1.88 m)
- Listed weight: 304 lb (138 kg)

Career information
- High school: Woodbridge (VA)
- College: Virginia Tech
- NFL draft: 2001: 5th round, 137th overall pick

Career history
- Dallas Cowboys (2001–2004); St. Louis Rams (2004); Atlanta Falcons (2005–2006); Tampa Bay Buccaneers (2007); New Orleans Saints (2008); Tennessee Titans (2009)*
- * Offseason or practice squad member only

Awards and highlights
- 2× Second-team All-Big East (1999, 2000)

Career NFL statistics
- Games played: 98
- Games started: 51
- Stats at Pro Football Reference

Matthew Steven Lehr (born April 25, 1979) is an American former professional football player who was a guard in the National Football League (NFL) for the Dallas Cowboys, St. Louis Rams, Atlanta Falcons, Tampa Bay Buccaneers and New Orleans Saints. He played college football for the Virginia Tech Hokies and was selected by the Dallas Cowboys in the fifth round of the 2001 NFL draft.

== Early life ==
Lehr attended Woodbridge High School, where he was a two-way player at offensive guard and defensive end. He was a three-time All-District and All-Northwest selection. As a junior, he received second-team All-state honors.

As a senior, he posted 40 tackles and 6 sacks, while being named to the All-state team. He was also an All-State selection in the shot put.

== College career ==
Lehr accepted a football scholarship from Virginia Tech. He appeared in 4 games as a freshman. The next year, he missed the first 2 games with an ankle injury, and became a starter at guard in the 10th game of the season against Rutgers University, blocking for quarterback Michael Vick.

As a junior, he was the regular starter at left guard, on a team that played in the BCS National Championship Game against Florida State University. He allowed only one sack and 3 quarterback pressures, leading the team with 57 knockdown blocks.

As a senior, he helped his team break the conference's rushing record with 270.5 rushing yards-per-game, which was also set by Virginia Tech the previous year. He surrendered only half a sack and 5 quarterback pressures, leading the team with 57 knockdown blocks.

== Professional career ==
=== Dallas Cowboys ===
Lehr was selected in the fifth round (137th overall) of the 2001 NFL draft by the Dallas Cowboys. Although he only played guard in college, he was expected to be the eventual replacement for Mark Stepnoski at center.

Lehr struggled during his time with the Cowboys because he lacked size and strength. As a rookie, he played eight games as a backup guard. In 2002, he was beat by Andre Gurode for the starting center position and Lehr remained mainly as a backup at guard and center, making 4 starts (2 in each position).

In 2003, Gurode was moved to guard and rookie Al Johnson missed the season with a right knee injury, which opened the door for Lehr to start 16 games at center on a team that made the playoffs. The next year, Johnson regained the starting center position and Lehr only started 2 games at right guard. On December 28, 2004, he was waived to create room to promote players from the practice squad.

=== St. Louis Rams ===
In 2004, he was claimed off waivers by the St. Louis Rams, but was inactive for the season finale and their two playoff games.

=== Atlanta Falcons ===
On March 11, 2005, he signed as a free agent with the Atlanta Falcons to help replace guard Roberto Garza. He started 15 games at left guard. The next year, he remained a starter, but was suspended for 4 games due to violating the NFL Substance Abuse Policy. On November 20, he returned to start the remaining games of the season. He was released on March 5, 2007.

=== Tampa Bay Buccaneers ===
On February 5, 2007, he signed as a free agent with the Tampa Bay Buccaneers, to compete for the left guard position, while Dan Buenning recovered from knee surgery. He played in all 16 games, but was used mostly on special teams. He wasn't re-signed after the season.

=== New Orleans Saints ===
On March 22, 2008, he signed with the New Orleans Saints reuniting him with head coach and former Cowboys offensive coordinator Sean Payton. On September 7 he was cut and re-signed 2 days later. On September 13, he was released and re-signed 4 days later.

He appeared in 13 contests and started 3 games in place of center Jonathan Goodwin, who was sidelined with a partially dislocated kneecap. He wasn't re-signed after the season.

=== Tennessee Titans ===
On August 25, 2009, he was signed as a free agent by the Tennessee Titans. He was released on September 1.

== Personal life ==
Lehr picked up the sport of bodybuilding and trained regularly with IFBB Pro Branch Warren. Lehr lives in the Dallas area.
