= Manassas City Public Schools =

School district in Virginia, United States

Address
- 8700 Centreville Rd., Suite 400 Manassas, Virginia, 20110; United States

District information
- Type: Public
- Grades: Pre-K through 12
- Superintendent: Kevin Newman
- School board: 7 members
- Chair of the board: Jill Spall
- Governing agency: Virginia Department of Education
- Schools: 9

Other information
- Website: www.mcpsva.org

Manassas City Public Schools is a school division that serves the city of Manassas, Virginia, United States. A small school district located in the Northern Virginia region, Manassas administers 5 elementary schools, 2 intermediate schools, 1 middle school, and 1 high school.

== History ==
=== Pre-establishment ===
Manassas has a history of prioritizing education since its establishment. In 1869, George Carr Round helped establish the Manassas Village School. The school met in the basement of a church for two years. In1872, The Ruffner School, named for William H. Ruffner, Virginia's first state superintendent, was built as the first public school in Virginia. Construction of the school was overseen by Round. The city was also home to the Manassas Institute. The school became a high school in 1908. and was renamed Manassas Agricultural High School in 1912.

==== African American Education ====
In 1869, the Manassas Village Colored School was opened as a private school, offering classes to primary grades. The school was renamed in 1872 after Mary Brown, a member of the Society of Friends. The school was the second public school in Manassas and the first for black students. The school moved locations in 1928 until its closing in 1954.

In 1893, the Manassas Industrial School for Colored Youth was founded by Jennie Dean. Frederick Douglass spoke at the school's dedication. The school mainly focused on vocational training for students in the black community. In 1954, after the decision of Brown v. Board of Education, the Brown School closed and students began attending Manassas Regional School. In 1960, the Prince William County Schools took control of the school and renamed it in Dean's honor: Jennie Dean High School. Students attended the school until schools fully integrated in 1966.

=== School District History (1977-present) ===
In 1977, Manassas started its own school system. They bought three schools from Prince William County and renovated them (one of which was Jennie Dean). Students attended Baldwin Elementary School, Jennie Dean Middle School (formerly Jennie Dean High School), and Osbourn High School. Weems Elementary (named after John Crompton Weems) was also opened in 1977.

In 1979, a 3rd elementary school was opened. It was named after Richard C. Haydon, a lifelong resident of Manassas and a former superintendent.

In 1986, a 4th elementary school was opened. It was named for George Carr Round, who a union army veteran and former state delegate who helped establish schools in the city.

In 1991, Jennie Dean Middle School was converted to an elementary school after the opening of a Junior High School named after longtime Manassas educator Grace E. Metz. The school was opened in serving grades 7, 8, and 9. Baldwin Elementary also received an expansion 1991.

In 2004, the school board approved building of a new school due to overcrowding. Mayfield Intermediate School opened in, changing the grades housed on each school level. Mayfield provided relief for the elementary schools in the district and Metz Middle School by housing fifth and sixth graders.

In 2016, Baldwin Elementary and Intermediate schools had opened a new campus. Baldwin Intermediate became the first new school opened in 10 years in the district. In 2024, Manassas City Public Schools also voted to rebuild Jennie Dean Elementary School.

==== Former Superintendents ====
- James Joseph Leo served as the district's first superintendent from 1977 to 1981. Before his appointment, he was an assistant principal at Osbourn High School and the Principal of Marstellar Junior High School (now Marstellar Middle School).
- Forrest Brent Sandidge served as the superintendent from 1981 to 1986. Before his appointment, he served as a principal in Augusta County Public Schools followed by administrative positions with Warren County Public Schools, Rappahanock County Public Schools, and Staunton City Schools. In 1964, he became Superintendent of Culpeper County Public Schools and then obtained a position with the State Department of Education in Richmond serving as Assistant Superintendent for Administration and Finance.
- Russell L. Thomas served as the superintendent from 1986 to 1989. Before his appointment, Thomas was the district's director of instruction.
- James Upperman served as the superintendent from 1989 to 2001. Before his appointment, Upperman was the principal at Osbourn High School and the district's assistant superintendent. Upperman was responsible for the "Safe and Secure Schools" initiative. As superintendent, he also oversaw a dropout rate decrease, a raise in standardized test scores, and an active staff development program.
- Sydney "Chip" Zullinger served as the superintendent from 2001 to 2006. Before his appointment, he was the Superintendent of the Natrona County School District Number 1, Sampson County Schools, Yancey County Schools, Charleston County School District and Denver Public Schools. Due to, Zullinger was forced out by the school board in September 2006 and resigned his duties immediately. After his dismissal, Zullinger served as the Chief Elementary Officer off Houston Independent School District.
- Dr. Gail E. Pope served as the superintendent from 2006 to 2012. Before her appointment, she was a school administrator in Spring Branch Independent School District and Virginia Beach City Public Schools, the Director of the Governor’s Best Practice Center with the Virginia Department of Education, and the Associate Superintendent for Curriculum and Instruction for Manassas Park City Schools. She was awarded the VASCD Curriculum Leader of the Year in 2006. During her tenure, Pope oversaw the full accreditation of Grace E. Metz Middle School and the roof repair of Mayfield Intermediate School. Pope was also selected for Region IV Superintendent of the Year in 2011.
- Dr. Catherine Magouyrk served as the superintendent from 2012 to 2018. Before her appointment, she was the assistant superintendent for the Douglas County School District.

== Administration ==
=== Superintendent ===
The superintendent of Manassas City Public Schools is Kevin Newman. He became superintendent on July 2, 2018. Newman previously served as the superintendent of Colonial Beach Public Schools. He was also a principal in King George County Schools, and in Colonial Beach.

=== School Board ===
There are 7 members of the Manassas City School Board and 2 student representatives. In 2024, three new school board members were elected. Diana Brown, Dr. Zella Jones, and Dayna-Marie Miles will be replacing Christina Brooks, Carl Hollingsworth, and Robyn R. Williams.

- Jill Spall, Chair
- Dr. Zella Jones, Vice-Chair
- Sara Brescia
- Diana Brown
- Dayna-Marie Miles
- Suzanne W. Seaberg
- Lisa A. Stevens
- Amelia Breeden, Student Representative
- Henok Emun, Student Representative

== Schools ==
There are 9 schools in the district: 5 elementary schools, 2 intermediate schools, one middle school, and one high school. All schools are located in the city of Manassas.

=== Elementary schools (PreK-4) ===
- Baldwin Elementary School
- Jennie Dean Elementary School
- R. C. Haydon Elementary School
- George C. Round Elementary School
- Weems Elementary School

=== Intermediate Schools (5-6) ===
- Baldwin Intermediate School
- Mayfield Intermediate School

=== Middle School (7-8) ===
- Grace E. Metz Middle School

=== High School (9-12) ===
- Osbourn High School
