= Gar-Field Senior High School =

Public high school in Woodbridge, Virginia, United States

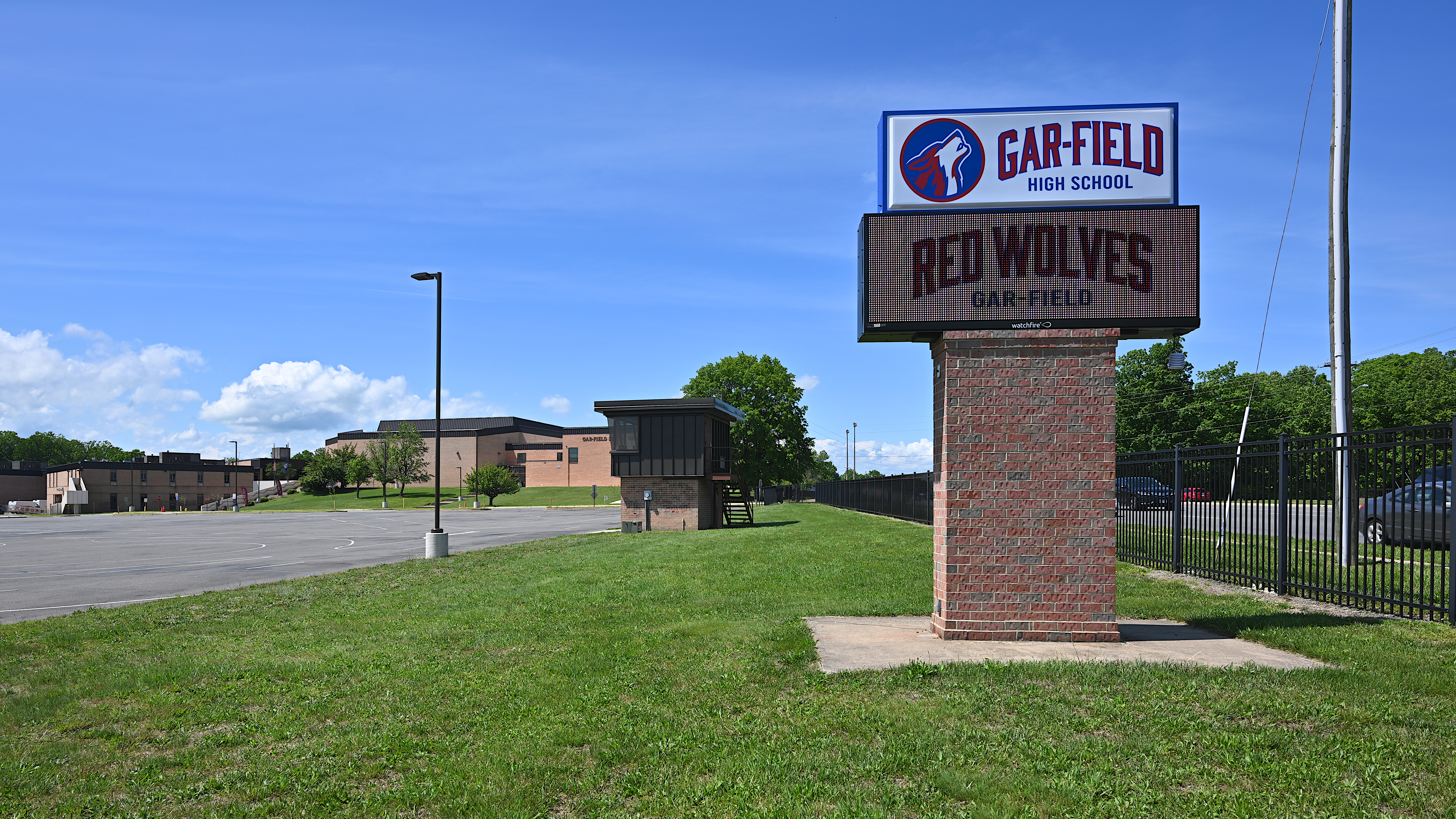
- Gar-Field High School in May 2022

Location
- 14000 Smoketown Road; Woodbridge, Virginia 22192

Information
- School type: Public, high school
- Motto: School of Champions
- Founded: 1953
- School district: Prince William County Public Schools
- Principal: Matthew Mathison
- Teaching staff: 151.00 (on an FTE basis)
- Grades: 9-12
- Enrollment: 2,550 (2022–23)
- Student to teacher ratio: 16.89
- Colors: Red; Blue
- Mascot: Indians (1953–2021); Red Wolves (2021–present)
- Website: Official Gar-Field High School website

Gar-Field Senior High School is a senior high school in Woodbridge in Prince William County, Virginia, United States, educating students in grades 9 to 12.

== History and administration ==
Gar-Field High School was opened on December 8, 1953, as a successor school to Occoquan District High School. The name Gar-Field is derived from two prominent local families, the Garbers and the Manderfields. According to Prince William County Circuit Court records, the Garbers and Manderfields donated approximately 20 acres of land for the original school near Neabsco Creek that had once been part of “Round Top Farm”, just off of U.S. Highway #1. The gift to Prince William County’s School Board stipulated that this land would be used for building a public school for white children. The school was later integrated by an African-American student named Joyce Russell Taylor in 1961. Russell Taylor's name was suggested when Prince William County Schools was choosing a new name for Stonewall Jackson (now Unity Reed High School) and when the district was choosing a name for their 13th High School (now Gainesville High School). Gar-Field was originally located at 15941 Cardinal Drive until the current school opened in 1972 on 14000 Smoketown Road.

=== Mascot name change ===
Since the creation of its predecessor, Occoquan District High School in 1927, Gar-Field's mascot was originally the Indians. However, in March 2021, at the request of student leaders, the school announced the name of the school's mascot would change. In June of the same year, the school announced the new mascot would be the Red Wolves.

=== Administration ===
The principal of Gar-Field High School is Matthew Mathison. Before coming to Gar-Field, he was an assistant principal at Woodbridge Senior High School. He has been principal since 2019.

== Academic programs ==
=== International Baccalaureate (IB) Program ===
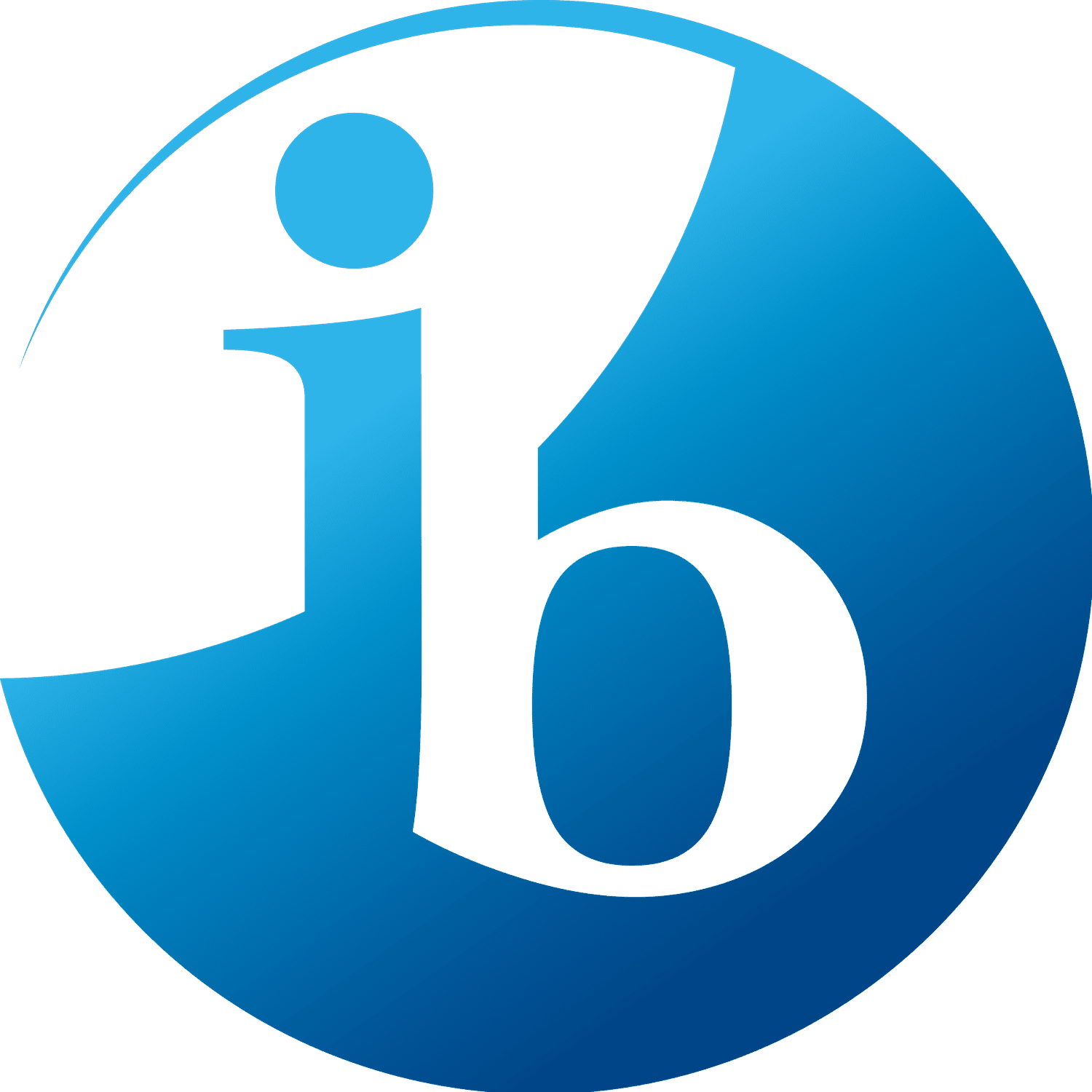
International Baccalaureate Program Logo

Gar-Field High School is an International Baccalaureate (IB) World School. They offer the IB Middle Years Programme (MYP), the IB Diploma Programme (DP), and the IB Career Related Programme (CP).

Gar-Field High School was first authorized to offer the IB Diploma Programme in 2000, IB Middle Years Programme in 2002, and Career Related Programme in 2016. Students can take part in full IB Programs at Gar-Field High School to earn a diploma or certificate. A student can also take courses offered by the IB in their levels of strength and interest, but do not have to be part of a larger IB Program. These are known as IB/MYP Course Students. Students can be awarded college credit with IB classes, and it weighs the GPA. Gar-Field is one of two high schools that houses the IB Program in Prince William County (the other is Unity Reed High School).

=== Other programs ===
Gar-Field High School also offers CTE programs in Culinary Arts, Law and Public Safety, and plumbing.

== Demographics ==
In the 2022–2023 school year, Gar-Field's 2,550 student body was:

- 62.6% Hispanic
- 20.7% Black
- 7.1% White
- 6.5% Asian
- 3.0% Two or More Races
- 0.1% American Indian/Alaskan

== Athletics ==
Gar-Field High School is in the 6A Cardinal District of the Virginia High School League. The school offers Cheer, Cross Country, Field Hockey, Football, golf, basketball, gymnastics, indoor and outdoor track, swimming and diving, baseball, crew, lacrosse, soccer, softball, and tennis.

== Notable alumni ==
- Jeff Baker, former MLB player (2005-2015)
- Benita Fitzgerald, 1984 Olympic gold medalist, 100-meter hurdles
- Bishop Fitzgerald, college football safety for the USC Trojans
- Paula Girven, Olympic high jumper
- Emmylou Harris, country western singer
- Bob Malloy, Texas Rangers/Montreal Expos professional MLB player 1987 and 1990
- Brian McNichol, former MLB player for the Chicago Cubs
- Lane Napper, actor, choreographer, dancer, acting coach, and dance teacher.
- Jeff Nixon, professional football player
- Winston October, college football coach and former professional football player
- Clint Sintim, college football coach and former NFL Linebacker for the New York Giants
- Chris Sprouse, comic book artist
- Shaboozey, recording artist
- Sheena Tosta (née Johnson), Olympic hurdler and 2008 silver medalist
- Tara Wheeler, Miss Virginia 2008 and news anchor for WCAV CBS19 in Charlottesville, VA
- Othell Wilson, former NBA basketball player
- Andrew York, Grammy-winning recording artist
