= 1959 All-Southern Conference football team =

The 1959 All-Southern Conference football team consists of American football players chosen by the Associated Press (AP) and United Press (UP) for the All-Southern Conference football team for the 1959 college football season.

== All-Southern Conference selections ==
=== Backs ===
- Howard Dyer, VMI (AP-1)
- Alger Pugh, Virginia Tech (AP-1)
- David Ames, Richmond (AP-1)
- Sam Horner, VMI (AP-1)
- Ed Hino, George Washington (AP-2)
- Ray Peterson, West Virginia (AP-2)
- Jerry Nettles, The Citadel (AP-2)
- John Traynham, VMI (AP-2)

=== Ends ===
- Carroll Dale, Virginia Tech (AP-1)
- Paul Maguire, The Citadel (AP-1)
- Dick Evans, VMI (AP-2)
- Danny House, Davidson (AP-2)

=== Tackles ===
- Mike Lashley, William & Mary (AP-1)
- Pat Lamberti, Richmond (AP-1)
- Carl Dannenberg, West Virginia (AP-2)
- Bernie Vishneski, Virginia Tech (AP-2)

=== Guards ===
- Bill Lopasky, West Virginia (AP-1)
- Mike Zeno, Virginia Tech (AP-1)
- Lou Shuba, VMI (AP-2)
- Wayne Woolwine, William & Mary (AP-2)

=== Centers ===
- Ron DeMelfi, George Washington (AP-1)
- Chuck Boone, Richmond (AP-2)

== Key ==
AP = Associated Press

== See also ==
- 1959 College Football All-America Team
