= Bill Lopasky =

American football player (born 1937)

No. 57
- Position: Offensive guard

Personal information
- Born: January 29, 1937 (age 89); Wilkes-Barre, Pennsylvania, U.S.
- Listed height: 6 ft 2 in (1.88 m)
- Listed weight: 235 lb (107 kg)

Career information
- High school: Lehman (Lehman Township, Pennsylvania)
- College: West Virginia
- NFL draft: 1959: 13th round, 150th overall pick

Career history
- San Francisco 49ers (1960–1961); New York Jets (1963)*
- * Offseason or practice squad member only

Awards and highlights
- 2× First-team All-Southern (1958, 1959)
- Stats at Pro Football Reference

William Joseph Lopasky (born January 29, 1937) is an American former professional football offensive guard who played for the San Francisco 49ers of the National Football League (NFL). He played college football for the West Virginia Mountaineers and was selected by the 49ers in the 13th round of the 1959 NFL draft.

== Early life ==
William Joseph Lopasky was born on January 29, 1937, in Wilkes-Barre, Pennsylvania. He attended Lehman High School in Lehman Township, Luzerne County, Pennsylvania.

== College career ==
Lopasky enrolled at West Virginia University to play college football for the Mountaineers. He was on the freshmen team in 1955 and did not play in 1956. He worked as a gravedigger in his hometown of Lehman before the 1957 season. Lopasky played for the varsity team in 1957 but did not earn a letter. He was a two-year letterman from 1958 to 1959. He was named Associated Press (AP) and United Press first-team All-Southern Conference in 1958 and AP first-team All-Southern Conference in 1959. Lopasky was the Mountaineer team captain his senior year in 1959.

== Professional career ==
Lopasky was selected by the San Francisco 49ers in the 13th round, with the 150th overall pick, of the 1959 NFL draft and by the Los Angeles Chargers in the first selections portion of the 1960 AFL draft. He signed with the 49ers for the 1960 season but ended up spending the entire year on injured reserve with a leg injury. He was waived on September 11, 1961, before the start of the 1961 season. On October 12, it was reported that Lopasky had re-signed with the 49ers after Dale Messer suffered a broken leg. Lopasky played in ten games during the 1961 season as a reserve offensive guard/linebacker. He was waived again on August 28, 1962.

Lopasky signed with the New York Jets of the American Football League in 1963. He was released on August 27, 1963.

== Personal life ==
Lopasky's brother, Joe Lopasky, played college football for the Houston Cougars. Bill was a teacher for 37 years.
