= Lucky Whitehead =

American football player (born 1992)

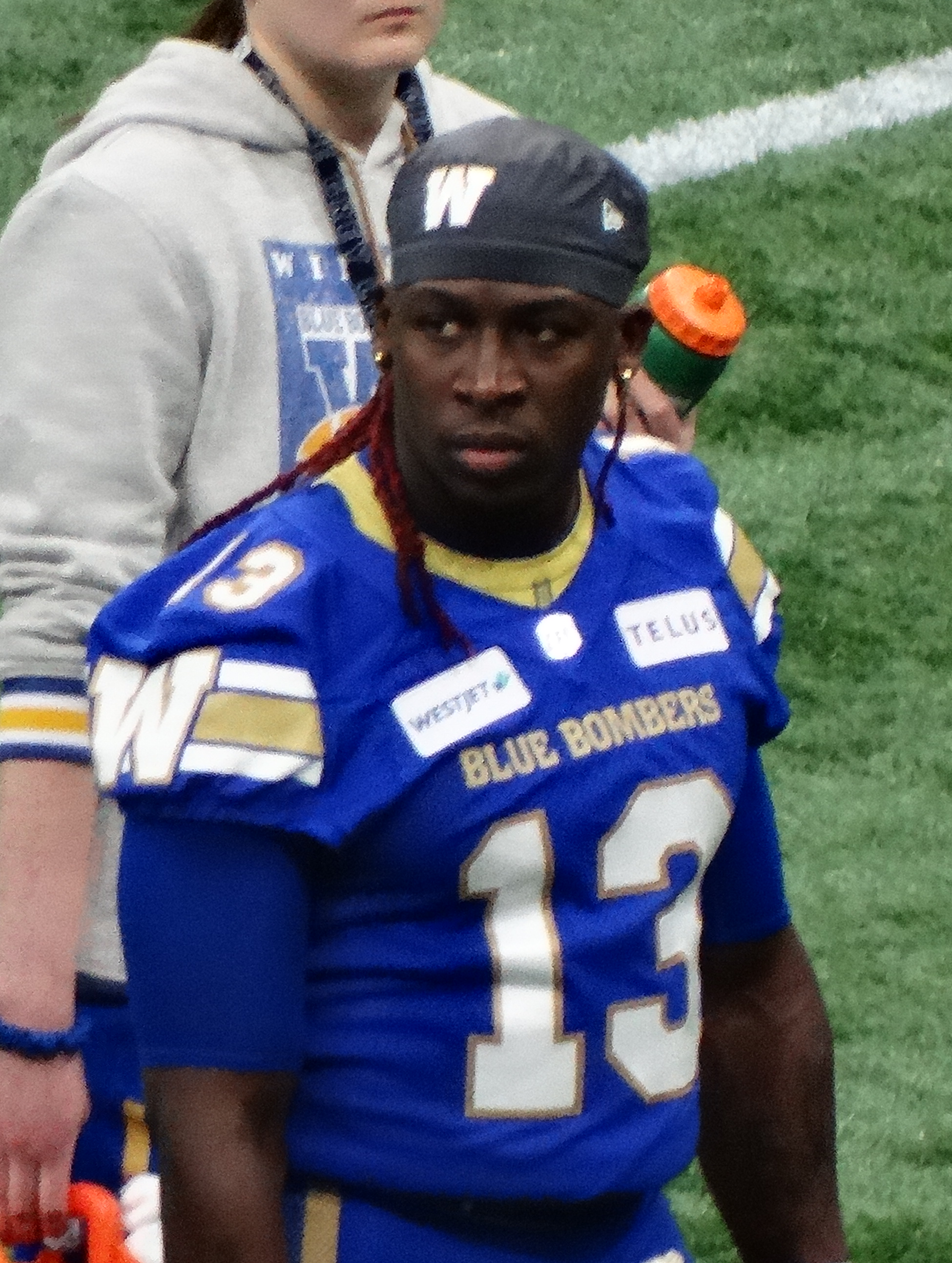
- Whitehead with the Winnipeg Blue Bombers

No. 13
- Positions: Wide receiver, kick returner

Personal information
- Born: June 2, 1992 (age 34); Manassas, Virginia, U.S.
- Listed height: 5 ft 10 in (1.78 m)
- Listed weight: 177 lb (80 kg)

Career information
- High school: Osbourn (Manassas)
- College: Florida Atlantic
- NFL draft: 2015: undrafted

Career history
- Dallas Cowboys (2015–2016); New York Jets (2017); Winnipeg Blue Bombers (2019–2020); BC Lions (2021–2023); Winnipeg Blue Bombers (2024)

Awards and highlights
- Grey Cup champion (2019); CFL All-Star (2021); CFL West All-Star (2021); First-team All-Conference USA (2014)

Career NFL statistics
- Receptions: 9
- Receiving yards: 64
- Rushing yards: 189
- Return yards: 1,151
- Total touchdowns: 2
- Stats at Pro Football Reference

Career CFL statistics
- Receptions: 248
- Receiving yards: 3,192
- Rushing yards: 118
- Total return yards: 1,099
- Total touchdowns: 16
- Stats at CFL.ca

Rodney Darnell "Lucky" Whitehead Jr. (born June 2, 1992) is an American former professional football player who was a wide receiver and kick returner for three seasons in the National Football League (NFL) and five years in the Canadian Football League (CFL). He was a member of the Dallas Cowboys, New York Jets, Winnipeg Blue Bombers, and BC Lions. He is a Grey Cup champion after winning with the Blue Bombers in 2019 and was named a CFL All-Star in 2021. He played college football for the Florida Atlantic Owls.

== Early life ==
Whitehead was born in Manassas, Virginia on June 2, 1992. He attended George C. Round Elementary and Osbourn High School where he played wide receiver and cornerback on the football team, while being named All-Conference as a senior.

== College career ==
Whitehead first attended Dean College in Franklin, Massachusetts, where he played wide receiver and return specialist for the Bulldogs, receiving All-American and All-Conference honors. In 2013, he transferred to Florida Atlantic University to play for the Owls where he registered 284 all-purpose yards. As a senior, Whitehead was the team's slot receiver, registering 76 receptions, which led the conference, for 706 yards and six touchdowns, 21 carries for 210 yards and two touchdowns, and a 24.7-yard average on kickoff returns. He had a 73-yard punt return for a touchdown in his last college game against the Old Dominion Monarchs.

== Professional career ==
Pre-draft measurables
| Height | Weight | Arm length | Hand span | 40-yard dash | 10-yard split | 20-yard split | 20-yard shuttle | Three-cone drill | Vertical jump | Broad jump | Bench press |
|---|---|---|---|---|---|---|---|---|---|---|---|
| 5 ft 9 1/2 in (1.77 m) | 179 lb (81 kg) | 32 in (0.81 m) | 8 7/8 in (0.23 m) | 4.39 s | 1.54 s | 2.54 s | 4.18 s | 6.89 s | 36.0 in (0.91 m) | 10 ft 1 in (3.07 m) | 20 reps |
All values from Pro Day

=== Dallas Cowboys ===
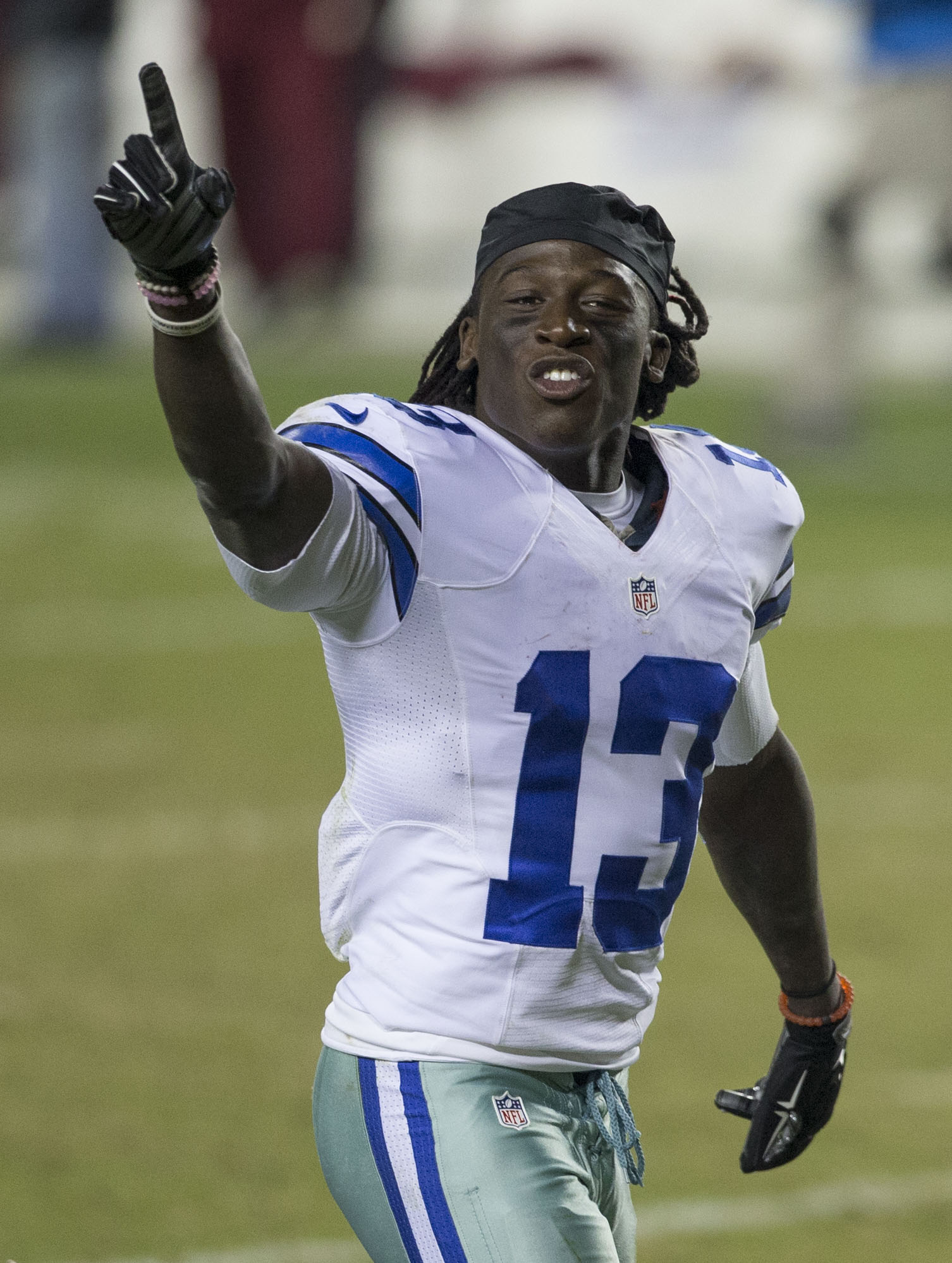
Whitehead with the Dallas Cowboys in 2015.

==== 2015 season ====
Whitehead was signed as an undrafted free agent by the Dallas Cowboys after the 2015 NFL draft. He made the team as one of the players that was looked upon to replace the departed Dwayne Harris special teams production. Although wide receiver Cole Beasley was the assigned punt returner early in the season, because he provided better ball security, Whitehead was given opportunities until earning the returner role for the final six games. He only averaged 5.8 yards per attempt as a punt returner, but showed glimpses as a kickoff returner (28.3 yards avg.), like his 79-yard kickoff return against the Philadelphia Eagles or his key 46-yard kickoff return against the Washington Redskins to set up the game-winning field goal with 14 seconds left. Whitehead was used on offense with special runs designed for him. In the sixth game of the season against the New York Giants, he set a franchise record for a wide receiver with four rushing attempts. He finished the 2015 season with 10 rushes for 107 yards and six receptions for 16 yards.

==== 2016 season ====
In the preseason opener, which was the first NFL game in Los Angeles since 1994, against the Los Angeles Rams at the Los Angeles Memorial Coliseum, Whitehead returned the opening kickoff 101 yards for a touchdown. In addition, he had one catch for six yards and one rushing attempt for 11 yards. In Week 6 against the Green Bay Packers, Whitehead caught a career-long 35-yard reception from quarterback Dak Prescott, as well as a season-long 26 yard run. Whitehead experienced problems during the season, like his critical fumble during a run against the Minnesota Vikings. The next week after being late to team meetings on the Saturday before the trip to New York, he was subsequently left home, fined and de-activated against the New York Giants. Whitehead remained more effective as a runner out of the backfield than at wide receiver, and was inconsistent as a return specialist. He shared the returner role with Beasley and running back Lance Dunbar, especially in critical situations, when better ball security was required. He had a total of three fumbles, losing two.

==== 2017 season ====
On July 24, 2017, it was revealed that Whitehead was facing misdemeanor petty larceny charges stemming from an arrest in June having stolen $25 of goods from a Wawa convenience store in Prince William County, Virginia and skipped court summons. Later that day after the team's first training camp practice, he was released by the Cowboys. The charges were dropped and he was cleared by the police when it was determined the next day that the charges were based on mistaken identity.

=== New York Jets ===
On July 26, 2017, Whitehead was claimed off waivers by the New York Jets. On August 16, it was revealed that Whitehead would undergo surgery for a fractured foot he suffered in practice, with an estimated recovery time of four to six weeks. He was waived/injured on September 2, and was placed on injured reserve. Whitehead was released by the team on September 11. He was re-signed to the Jets' practice squad on November 24. Whitehead was promoted to the active roster on December 30.

On August 26, 2018, Whitehead was waived/injured by the Jets and was placed on injured reserve. He was subsequently released by the Jets on August 31.

=== Winnipeg Blue Bombers (first stint) ===
Whitehead signed with the Winnipeg Blue Bombers of the Canadian Football League (CFL) on May 9, 2019. He had a breakout performance in Week 3 of the 2019 regular season, catching 7 passes for 155 yards with two touchdowns. Whitehead finished the year with 52 catches for 521 yards and two touchdowns, one rushing touchdown, and one kickoff return for a score in 15 regular season games. He was on the injured list during the Blue Bombers' playoff run, but was part of the 107th Grey Cup championship team. He did not play in 2020 following the cancellation of the 2020 CFL season and became a free agent in 2021.

=== BC Lions ===
On the first day of free agency in 2021, Whitehead signed with the BC Lions on February 9, 2021. On October 4, the Lions announced that Whitehead would undergo surgery after breaking his hand in during a Week 9 loss to the Winnipeg Blue Bombers. At the time of the injury Whitehead was second in the league in receiving yards with 665, trailing only Kenny Lawler. The injury kept him out of the lineup for three weeks and two games as he returned for the October 30 matchup against the Toronto Argonauts. He finished with 60 receptions for 932 yards and four touchdowns in just 12 games played as he was named a CFL All-Star for the first time in his career. On February 13, 2024, Whitehead's contract with the Lions expired and he became a free agent.

=== Winnipeg Blue Bombers (second stint) ===
On July 8, 2024, it was announced that Whitehead had signed with the Blue Bombers. He played in 10 regular season games in 2024 where he recorded 14 receptions for 115 yards and a touchdown, three carries for 11 yards, 47 punt returns for 524 yards, and 22 kickoff returns for 477 yards. Whitehead played in both post-season games, including the 111th Grey Cup where he returned four punts for 48 yards and five kickoffs for 101 yards, but also had a costly fumble in the Blue Bombers' 41–24 defeat to the Toronto Argonauts. After becoming a free agent in the following offseason, Whitehead announced his retirement from professional football on February 14, 2025.

== Personal life ==
Whitehead was given the nickname "Lucky" by his cousin. In July 2017, Whitehead posted on Instagram that his dog, Blitz, was stolen and held for ransom. The following day, Whitehead posted on Snapchat, confirming that Blitz was safely returned to him. Whitehead said that he refused to write a check for $10,000, as the perpetrator had initially demanded, but agreed to pay an undisclosed amount of money after making sure Blitz was okay.
