= Pennington Traditional School =

Coordinates: 38.754310°N 77.483123°W

- Manassas, Virginia

Information
- Type: Traditional School
- Motto: Exceeding Expectations to Achieve Excellence
- Established: 2000
- Principal: Michael Kelchlin
- Colors: Blue and Green
- Website: https://pennington.pwcs.edu/

Pennington Traditional School is a public school located in Manassas, Virginia. It is one of the three traditional schools of Prince William County Public Schools. The facility enrolls students from grade 1–8, and serves the communities of Manassas, Haymarket, Bristow, Bull Run, Gainesville, and Nokesville. The school is named after Philip Michael Pennington, a Prince William County police officer who was killed in the line of duty in 1990.

In September 2000, Pennington became the first traditional school of Prince William County. Since then, only two more (Porter Traditional School and the Nokesville School) have been constructed.

Students must wear uniforms and follow a strict behavioral code, and both parents and students alike are required to get an amount of validated community service hours.

Pennington has won a number of awards and recognitions for its academic achievements over the years, the "School of Excellence Award", awarded almost annually since 2001.

Pennington accepts students based on a lottery. About 350 students apply every year, and about 100 are admitted. Most recruits are accepted through the first grade, where 75 openings are available.

Despite lacking a sports team, Pennington provides clubs such as Intramural and the Running Club to students who want to be involved in extracurricular physical activities, and a vast selection of other clubs such as Chess, Creative Writing, Foreign Language, Girl Scouts, Robotics Clubs, Muslim Student Association, Stitching Club, EDGE club, and Yearbook among others

== Public Opinion ==
The school has gotten fairly positive reviews on Facebook (4/5) and Great Schools (5/5) from parents of Pennington students, while former students blast Pennington via Google (2/5).
