= Prince William County Public Schools =

School division in Virginia, United States

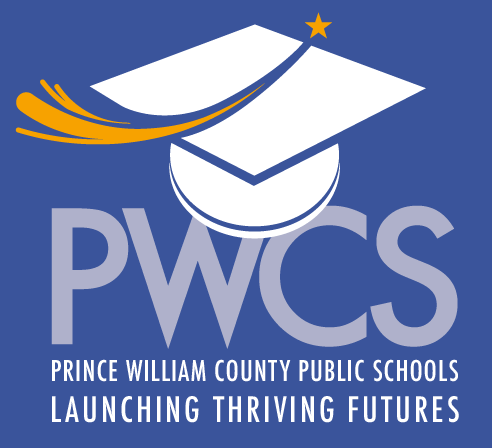
- 14715 Bristow Road Manassas, Virginia, 20112

District information
- Type: Public
- Motto: Launching Thriving Futures
- Grades: Pre-K–12
- Superintendent: LaTanya D. McDade
- Deputy superintendent(s): Carol E. Flenard
- Chair of the board: Babur B. Lateef
- Budget: $1.64 billion (FY 2024)

Students and staff
- Students: 91,180 (2022–23)
- Teachers: 5,696.94 (on an FTE basis)
- Staff: 10,740.34 (on an FTE basis)
- Student–teacher ratio: 16.19

Other information
- Website: www.pwcs.edu

Prince William County Public Schools (PWCS) is a school division in Virginia with its headquarters in the Kelly Leadership Center located in the unincorporated community of Independent Hill in Prince William County, Virginia. As of the 2020 census, the population of the county was 486,943.

Prince William County Public Schools is the second largest school division in Virginia with 91,180 students. Prince William County Public Schools is the fourth largest school system in the Washington Metropolitan Area after the Fairfax County, Virginia; Montgomery County, Maryland; and Prince George's County, Maryland school systems, and the 33rd largest school system in the United States.

The county system serves all parts of the county except for Marine Corps Base Quantico, which is served by the Department of Defense Education Activity.

== Administration ==
=== Superintendent ===
The Superintendent of Prince William County Public Schools is Dr. LaTanya D. McDade, replacing Dr. Steven Walts. She is the first woman and the first African-American superintendent in the district's history. Prior to her appointment in 2021, she was the Chief Education Officer for Chicago Public Schools. In 2024, she was selected as Virginia Region IV Superintendent of the Year.

=== School Board ===
Prince William County Public Schools is governed by the Prince William County School Board. The school board is composed of eight elected members. One member is elected by the citizens of each of the seven magisterial districts also used to elect the Prince William Board of County Supervisors, while the Chairmen At-Large is elected by all citizens in the county. A Vice Chair is elected by the school board members each January. School board members serve four-year terms, with the next election being held in November 2023.

Board Members
| Babur B. Lateef | Chairman At-Large |
| Lisa A. Zargarpur | Vice Chairwoman Coles District |
| Erica C. Tredinnick | Brentsville District |
| Jennifer T. Wall | Gainesville District |
| Tracy L. Blake | Neabsco District |
| Richard M. Jessie | Ocooquan District |
| Justin David Wilk | Potomac District |
| Loree Y. Williams | Woodbridge District |

Two non-voting student representatives are selected each school year to serve and provide input from a student's perspective on decisions made by the school board. A Student Senate is made up of one student from each high school who applied for the student representative position. They work together with the student representatives to advise the school board.

== Schools ==
=== High schools ===
- Battlefield High School
- Brentsville District High School
- Charles J. Colgan Sr. High School
- Forest Park High School
- Freedom High School
- Gainesville High School
- Gar-Field High School
- Hylton High School
- Osbourn Park High School
- Patriot High School
- Potomac High School
- Unity Reed High School
- Woodbridge High School

=== Middle schools ===
- Louise A. Benton Middle School
- Stuart M. Beville Middle School
- Bull Run Middle School
- Fred M. Lynn Middle School
- Gainesville Middle School
- Graham Park Middle School
- George M. Hampton Middle School (Formerly Mills E. Godwin Middle School)
- Lake Ridge Middle School
- Emlyn H. Marsteller Middle School
- Parkside Middle School
- Potomac Middle School
- Potomac Shores Middle School
- Ronald Wilson Reagan Middle School
- Rippon Middle School
- Herbert J. Saunders Middle School
- Unity Braxton Middle School (formerly Stonewall Middle School; renamed during the George Floyd protests)
- Woodbridge Middle School

=== Traditional Schools (K-8) ===
- The Nokesville School
- Pennington Traditional School
- Mary G. Porter Traditional School

=== Elementary schools ===
- James W. Alvey Elementary School
- Antietam Elementary School
- Ashland Elementary School
- Bel Air Elementary School
- Belmont Elementary School
- Maitland C. Bennett Elementary School
- Bristow Run Elementary School
- Buckland Mills Elementary School
- Cedar Point Elementary School
- Chris Yung Elementary School
- Coles Elementary School
- Covington-Harper Elementary School
- Dale City Elementary School
- Dumfries Elementary School
- Suella Gilbert Ellis Elementary School
- Enterprise Elementary School
- Featherstone Elementary School
- Fannie W. Fitzgerald Elementary School
- Glenkirk Elementary School
- Samuel L. Gravely Elementary School
- Haymarket Elementary School
- Alexander Henderson Elementary School
- Innovation Elementary School
- John D. Jenkins Elementary School
- Kerrydale Elementary School
- R. Dean Kilby Elementary School
- Martin Luther King Jr. Elementary School
- Lake Ridge Elementary School
- Leesylvania Elementary School
- Loch Lomond Elementary School
- Thurgood Marshall Elementary School
- Marumsco Hills Elementary School
- Sharon C. McAuliffe Elementary School
- Minnieville Elementary School
- Montclair Elementary School
- Mountain View Elementary School
- Mullen Elementary School
- Neabsco Elementary School
- Occoquan Elementary School
- Old Bridge Elementary School
- John F. Pattie Sr. Elementary School
- Sonnie P. Penn Elementary School
- Piney Branch Elementary School
- Potomac View Elementary School
- River Oaks Elementary School
- Rockledge Elementary School
- Rosa Parks Elementary School
- Signal Hill Elementary School
- Charles A. Sinclair Elementary School
- Springwoods Elementary School
- Sudley Elementary School
- Swans Creek Elementary School
- T. Clay Wood Elementary School
- Triangle Elementary School
- George Grayson Tyler Elementary School
- Elizabeth Vaughan Elementary School
- Victory Elementary School
- Washington-Reid Elementary School
- West Gate Elementary School
- Westridge Elementary School
- Mary Williams Elementary School
- Kyle R. Wilson Elementary School
- Woodbridge Elementary School
- Yorkshire Elementary School

=== Other ===
Prince William County provides an "alternative" school service for what they deem as "troubled teens". Students who become pregnant, sell or use drugs, write graffiti, have general behavioral issues or are prone to violence are usually sent to learn together in the same facility, regardless of their base school. The PACE program targets students with more extreme cases of psychological issues.

- Independent Hill School/PACE East, special education school for middle & high school students
- New Directions Alternative School, special school for students who are not successful in their base school
- New Dominion Alternative School, special school for middle school students
- PACE West, a special education school providing services to students with serious emotional and behavior problems
- Pennington Traditional School, a school for first through eighth graders [Formerly a high school, grades 9-12]
- Porter Traditional School, specialty school for first through eighth graders
- Woodbine Preschool Center, a center for preschool-aged children with developmental disabilities
- East End Alternative, now defunct. Previously located at a Woodbridge Boys and Girls Club. The student body was migrated to Pennington Alternative School in the mid-1990s.

=== Future Schools ===
- "Woodbridge Area" Elementary School is set to open for the 2025–26 school year

== Schools of excellence ==
Prince William County Public Schools honors schools as Schools of Excellence based on a variety of criteria, including: performance targets; Adequate Yearly Progress under the No Child Left Behind Act; Virginia Wellness Tests; school attendance rates; and parent, student, and teacher satisfaction. The Virginia state Standards of Learning (SOL) tests for both students on grade level and students below grade level are also considered. In 2006, the criteria were adjusted to reflect the continuous improvement of the system's schools.

School administration and staff are presented with a commemorative flag, a plaque, and a check to be used at the school's discretion. Schools receive $1,000 for each year the School of Excellence designation is obtained.

| | 2001 | 2002 | 2003 | 2004 | 2005 | 2006 | 2007 | 2008 | 2009 | 2010 | 2011 | 2012 | 2013 | 2014 | 2015 |
|---|---|---|---|---|---|---|---|---|---|---|---|---|---|---|---|
| Elementary | 13 | 10 | 28 | 40 | 32 | 23 | 22 | 27 | 35 | 36 | 16 | 32 | 37 | 38 | 30 |
| Middle | 0 | 2 | 7 | 12 | 9 | 0 | 0 | 0 | 2 | 3 | 0 | 6 | 5 | 5 | 0 |
| High | 2 | 2 | 7 | 5 | 4 | 4 | 1 | 1 | 2 | 1 | 0 | 0 | 0 | 1 | 2 |
| Other | 0 | 1 | 0 | 1 | 1 | 1 | 2 | 1 | 2 | 2 | 2 | 2 | 2 | 2 | 2 |
| Total | 15 | 15 | 42 | 58 | 46 | 28 | 25 | 29 | 41 | 42 | 18 | 40 | 44 | 46 | 34 |

== See also ==
- List of school divisions in Virginia
