= Wesley Williams (American football) =

American football player (born 2004)

No. 97 – Jacksonville Jaguars
- Position: Defensive end
- Roster status: Active

Personal information
- Born: September 22, 2004 (age 22); Gainesville, Virginia, U.S.
- Listed height: 6 ft 3 in (1.91 m)
- Listed weight: 256 lb (116 kg)

Career information
- High school: Battlefield (Haymarket, Virginia)
- College: Duke (2022–2025)
- NFL draft: 2026: 4th round, 119th overall pick

Career history
- Jacksonville Jaguars (2026–present)
- Stats at Pro Football Reference

Wesley Williams (born September 22, 2004) is an American professional football defensive end for the Jacksonville Jaguars of the National Football League (NFL). He played college football for the Duke Blue Devils and was selected by the Jaguars in the fourth round of the 2026 NFL draft.

== Early life ==
Williams was born on September 22, 2004, and grew up in Prince William County, Virginia. His father played college basketball, while his cousin and uncle played college football. In sixth grade, he first played football, and he continued while attending Battlefield High School in Haymarket. At Battlefield, he played as a defensive end and was a starter all four years, posting 105 tackles, 32 tackles-for-loss (TFLs) and 13.5 sacks as a senior while being named first-team all-state and the Class 6 Region B Defensive Player of the Year. That year, Williams helped them to the Class 6 state semifinals and their first regional championship in 10 years. During high school, he had a grade-point average (GPA) of 4.2 and won the Franklin D. Watkins Memorial Award, given to "the nation's top African-American high school scholar-athlete". Williams, a three-star recruit, committed to play college football for the Duke Blue Devils.

== College career ==
Williams redshirted and appeared in one game for Duke as a true freshman in 2022. The next year, he appeared in 13 games, three as a starter, and posted 39 tackles, 6.5 TFLs, 1.5 sacks and two blocked field goals, both of which were in the same game. As a redshirt sophomore in 2024, Williams posted a team-leading 7.5 sacks along with 48 tackles, 13.5 TFLs and two blocked kicks in 12 games started, earning honorable mention All-Atlantic Coast Conference (ACC) honors. He served as team captain in 2025 and totaled 44 tackles, 9.0 TFLs, 2.0 sacks and a blocked field goal in 14 starts, earning honorable mention All-ACC honors a second time. Williams was named Duke's defensive MVP for the 2025 season. He decided to forgo an extra season of eligibility and declared for the 2026 NFL draft. He was invited to the 2026 East–West Shrine Bowl and the NFL Scouting Combine.

== Professional career ==
Pre-draft measurables
Height	Weight	Arm length	Hand span	Wingspan	40-yard dash	10-yard split	20-yard split	20-yard shuttle	Three-cone drill	Vertical jump	Broad jump	Bench press
6 ft 3 3/4 in (1.92 m)	256 lb (116 kg)	31 7/8 in (0.81 m)	9 1/2 in (0.24 m)	6 ft 6 1/8 in (1.98 m)	4.89 s	1.68 s	2.83 s	4.47 s	7.13 s	35.5 in (0.90 m)	10 ft 0 in (3.05 m)	22 reps
All values from NFL Combine/Pro Day

Williams was selected by the Jacksonville Jaguars in the fourth round with the 119th overall pick in the 2026 NFL draft.
