= Charles J. Colgan Sr. High School =

Location
- 13833 Dumfries Rd; Manassas, Prince William County, Virginia 20112; United States
- 38.654413°N 77.439013°W

Information
- School type: Public Magnet
- Motto: Service, Honor, Creativity
- Founded: 2016
- School district: Prince William County Public Schools
- Principal: Jeffrey Litz
- Grades: 9 through 12
- Enrollment: 2,966 (2024–25)
- Colors: Colgan blue (navy); Caribbean blue Shark gray (gray)
- Mascot: Shark
- Website: Colgan High School

Charles J. Colgan Sr. High School is the 12th high school located in Independent Hill, Virginia. It opened in August 2016 and is named for American politician and businessman Charles J. Colgan.

Colgan High School serves a portion of the middle of Prince William County. The community consists of business, professional, U.S. government and military residents. Colgan High School has also been designated as the Center for the Fine and Performing Arts, a public magnet program that is one of the specialty programs offered by Prince William County Public Schools.

== Administration ==
Starting in the 2026–2027 school year, Jeffrey Litz will be the principal of Colgan High School. before being appointed principal of Colgan High School, Jeffrey Litz was the principal at Marshall High School in Fairfax County Public Schools.

Jeffrey Litz was preceded by Dr. Timothy Healey Before being appointed the inaugural principal, he was an assistant superintendent and the principal of Osbourn Park High School. He announced his retirement at the end of the 2025–2026 school year.

== Demographics ==
In the 2022–2023 school year, Colgan's student body was:

- 43.2% White
- 20.4% Hispanic
- 19.0% Black/African American
- 8.7% Asian
- 8.1% two or more races
- .4% Native American/Alaskan
- .2% Hawaiian/Pacific Islander

== Programs ==
Currently, Colgan High School is designated as the CFPA (Center for Fine and Performing Arts). The CFPA consists of nine programs:

- Band
- Choir
- Creative Writing
- Dance
- Music Technology
- Orchestra
- Piano
- Theater
- Visual Arts

Each program requires an audition/portfolio, depending on the concentration area. Auditions are open to all rising and current high school students attending a Prince William County public school.

== Athletics ==
In 2021, the Colgan girls' volleyball team won the class 6A state championship.

The Colgan Competition Cheerleading team won the class 6 state championship in 2022 and 2023.

== Architecture ==
Colgan High School is built based on a design model that focuses on natural light, open courtyard spaces, and current technology. Colgan High School has several design features that make it unique and tailored for students in the arts:

- Largest auditorium in Prince William County Schools, with professional sound and lighting
- Purposefully designed black box theater to allow for small performances and support student creativity
- Outdoor amphitheater with covered stage
- Large contemporary dance studio
- Hydraulic lift for orchestra pit allowing for effective use of stage (including stage extension)
- Large art rooms with new equipment and supplies overlooking a beautiful courtyard
- Dedicated space for band, orchestra, and chorus – including Wenger© soundproof practice rooms

Colgan High School also includes the School Division's Aquatics Center. While the Aquatics Center is physically attached to the school, it serves the entire school division. The Aquatics Center is used by all students in Prince William County Schools through swim & dive team practices and meets, and instructional purposes for water safety, lifeguard certification, and other related curricula.

== Notable alumni ==
- Quinn, musician
