= C.D. Hylton Senior High School =

Coordinates: 38°39′4″N 77°23′5″W

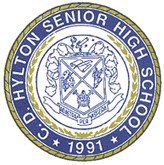

Location
- 14051 Spriggs Road; Woodbridge, Virginia 22193

Information
- School type: Public, high school
- Motto: We Are Family, Working Together for Total Success
- Established: 1991
- School district: Prince William County Public Schools
- Principal: Cassandra Crawford
- Teaching staff: 121.23 (on an FTE basis)
- Grades: 9–12
- Enrollment: 1,909 (2022–23)
- Student to teacher ratio: 15.75
- Colors: Navy Blue and Gold
- Mascot: Bulldog
- Website: https://hyltonhs.pwcs.edu/

C.D. Hylton Senior High School, commonly known as Hylton High School, C.D. Hylton, or simply Hylton, is a public high school located in Dale City in Prince William County, Virginia, United States, and part of the Prince William County Public Schools division.

The school is named after real estate developer Cecil D. Hylton, who built thousands of homes in Dale City, Virginia and surrounding areas. Cecil D. Hylton donated the land that the school grounds are currently using.

In 2011, Mrs. Carolyn Custard (former Hylton High School principal) became the Director of Student Services for Prince William County Public Schools.

In May 2007, Newsweek magazine ranked Hylton High School the 298th-best school in the nation on its annual list of "Best High Schools in America."

Hylton High School is also home of the Irene V. Hylton Planetarium (named after Cecil's D. Hylton's wife). The planetarium offers shows to all 100 Prince William County Schools during the day as well as public offerings in the evenings and private shows by appointment.

== Test scores ==
Hylton High School is a fully accredited school based on its performance on the Virginia Standards of Learning tests. The average SAT score in 2015 was 1454 (out of 2400).

== Athletics ==
In 2013 Michael Alison Chandler of The Washington Post wrote that C.D. Hylton High "is considered a football powerhouse."

== Notable alumni ==
- Tommy Adams, former college basketball player and 2002 Mid-Eastern Athletic Conference player of the year for Hampton University
- Alec Bettinger, former professional baseball player, Milwaukee Brewers
- Ahmad Brooks, former professional football player, Cincinnati Bengals, Green Bay Packers, and San Francisco 49ers
- Brandon Brown, NASCAR Xfinity Series professional race car driver
- Deon Butler, former professional football player, Seattle Seahawks
- Grover Gibson, former professional soccer player, 2. Bundesliga league in Germany
- Ali Krieger, professional soccer player, NJ/NY Gotham FC, former U.S. Women's National Soccer Team member, 2015 FIFA Women's World Cup champion, and 2016 Summer Olympian
- Travon McMillian, former professional football player, Pittsburgh Steelers
- Darius Reynolds, professional football player, Jacksonville Sharks of the National Arena League
- Andre Scrubb, former professional baseball player, Houston Astros
- David Stokes, former Major League Soccer player, D.C. United
- Amy Tong, 2000 Summer Olympian, judo

== Specialty programs ==
CISL (pronounced "sizzle") is the Center for International Studies and Languages at Hylton High School, founded by Margaret Holt. The CISL program includes:

- A series of courses that emphasize an appreciation and understanding of world languages, world cultures, and global issues
- Selected extracurricular programs and community service activities promoting international awareness and global communication
- An exit interview demonstrating a working knowledge of a world language
- An interdisciplinary research paper conducted as an independent project through the AP Comparative Government class
