= Potomac High School (Virginia) =

Coordinates: 38°35′43.35″N 77°18′28.11″W

Potomac Senior High School

Location
- 3401 Panther Pride Drive; Dumfries, Virginia 22026

Information
- School type: Public, high school
- Motto: School of Excellence
- Founded: 1981
- School district: Prince William County Public Schools
- School number: (703) 441-4200
- Principal: Stacy Norwood
- Grades: 9–12
- Enrollment: 1,961 (2017-18)
- Student to teacher ratio: 16.52
- Colors: Navy blue, Columbia blue, and White
- Mascot: Panther
- Classification: AAA
- Region: Northwest
- District: Cardinal

Potomac Senior High School is a public secondary school in unincorporated Prince William County, Virginia, United States; just outside Dumfries.

Potomac Senior High School, which serves the nearby incorporated town of Dumfries was established in 1981. When the school first opened there were only freshmen and the students went to school. Originally the campus was located at 15941 Cardinal Drive (Woodbridge address), what is now the Dr. A. J. Ferlazzo Building. A year and a half later the current school was opened up and the freshmen and sophomores moved there during the Christmas break. The current school is at 3401 Panther Pride Drive (Dumfries, Virginia address). Panther Pride Drive was originally named "Four Year Trail." The name was changed by official decree of the school board on April 25, 2007.

In 1983 Potomac had its first graduating class of approximately 400 students. Students from both Graham Park Middle School, Rippon Middle School, and the new Potomac Middle School continue their education at Potomac High School.

In May 2007, Newsweek ranked Potomac 804th on its annual list of "Best High Schools in America." In 2008 and 2009, Newsweek ranked Potomac 265 out of 1,500 best public schools in America.

== Demographics ==
In the 2017–2018 school year, Potomac's student body was:

- 56.6% Black/African American
- 24.4% Hispanic
- 11.6% White
- 8.2% Asian
- 4.6% Two or More Races
- .4% American Indian/Alaskan
- .2% Hawaiian/Pacific Islander

== State champions ==
VHSL Record Book

=== Teams ===
- 1983 Baseball
- 1985 Softball
- 1988 Baseball
- 1995 Boys Basketball
- 1999 Boys Indoor Track
- 1999 Boys Outdoor Track
- 2000 Boys Indoor Track
- 2014 Boys Basketball
- 2016 Boys Basketball
- 2017 Boys Outdoor Track

=== Individuals ===
- 1983 Anthony Thomas Wrestling (119 lb)
- 2001 Chad Malone Wrestling (189 lb)
- 2011 Anthony Williams Track and Field (300m Hurdles)
- 2017 Donovan Louis Track and Field (Long Jump)
- 2017 Donovan Louis Track and Field (55m Dash)
- 2017 Donovan Louis Track and Field (Long Jump)
- 2018 Donovan Louis Track and Field (55m Dash)
- 2019 Matthew Mitchell Track and Field (55m Hurdles)

=== Student groups ===
- Marching Band
- Winter Color Guard

=== Extracurricular activities ===
The Pride of Potomac Marching Panthers is a 17-year Virginia Honor Band, and is affiliated with the Virginia Band and Orchestra Director's Association, or VBODA.

== Cambridge program for mathematics and physical sciences ==
Potomac Senior High School hosts the Cambridge Program for Mathematics and Physical Sciences which is an international curriculum offering broad and balanced study for academically able students. The Cambridge curriculum aims to encourage the skills of independent research and investigation, the use of initiative and creativity and the application of knowledge and skills.

Cambridge Scholars are students who take and pass six or more AICE level examinations.

Potomac Senior High School has removed all AP classes aside from AP US Government for the 2008–2009 school year and now only offers Cambridge courses.

== Test scores ==
Potomac Senior High School is a fully accredited high school based on its performance on the Virginia Standards of Learning tests. Its SAT average in 2005 was a 923 (463 in Verbal; 460 in Math)

== Notable alumni ==
- Craig Novitsky (1989), NFL offensive guard
- Tommy Thigpen (1989), NFL player and college football coach
- Brian Fitzgerald (1992), MLB pitcher
- Cliff Hawkins (2000), basketball player who played professionally overseas
- Abdul Kanneh (2008), CFL defensive back
- Lynetta Kizer (2008), WNBA player
