= Freedom High School (Woodbridge, Virginia) =

Location
- 15201 Neabsco Mills Road; Woodbridge, Virginia 22191; United States

Information
- Type: Public
- Motto: Where teachers are leaders and students are scholars
- Founded: 2004
- School district: Prince William County Public Schools
- Principal: Chevelli Smith
- Teaching staff: 145,79 (on an FTE basis)
- Grades: 9-12
- Enrollment: 2,345 (2022–23)
- Student to teacher ratio: 16.09
- Colors: Black; Gold
- Mascot: Eagle
- Website: freedomhs.pwcs.edu

Freedom High School is a public high school established in 2004. It is located in Woodbridge, Virginia in unincorporated Prince William County, Virginia, United States, and is part of Prince William County Public Schools. The school is located on 15201 Neabsco Mills Road. In May 2007, Newsweek ranked Freedom 1148th in the nation on its annual list of "Best High Schools in America." Another Freedom High School is located in adjoining Loudoun County, Virginia which shares the same mascot and colors. Freedom High School is located at (38.621389° N, -77.2875° W). Freedom High School is home to a 9/11 memorial in the shape of a sundial. The Freedom Varsity Football Team won the VHSL 6A State Championship in the 2022-23 season, ranked 100 nationally.

== 9/11 Dedication ==
Freedom High School held its dedication ceremony on September 11, 2004. The school also dedicated its memorial to the Prince William County victims of the September 11 attacks. As a permanent part of the high school, there is a 62-foot-diameter (19 m) sundial dedicated to them. The names of the Prince William County victims are inscribed on the bricks around the sundial. Four brass plates are placed on the face of the sundial to mark the times when the four airliners struck the North and South Twin Towers, the Pentagon, and the field in Pennsylvania. Before each home football game, Freedom High School pays tribute to the victims of 9/11.

== Schedule ==
FHS' schedule revolves around a blocked schedule which consists of "even" and "odd" days. On "even" days classes are held for periods 2, flex, 4, & 6 and on "odd" days classes are held for periods 1, 3, 5, & 7. The date does not determine whether it is an even or an odd day.

== Athletics and student groups ==
Freedom offers many opportunities for students to participate in various sports teams and student groups to support their academics and challenge them to learn and grow outside the classroom. Such activities include:

Freedom's boys basketball have won regionals for the past three years.

=== Marching Band ===
The Freedom High School (Woodbridge, VA) Marching Eagles Band has gained a reputation as Northern Virginia's premiere multicultural high stepping marching band. They were one of two high school bands that performed during the gubernatorial inauguration of Ralph Northam in 2018.

=== Sports teams ===
- Baseball
- Boys Basketball varsity
- Boys Freshman Basketball
- Boys JV Basketball
- Boys Soccer
- Boys Tennis
- Cheerleading
- Football
- Freshman Cheerleading
- Girls Basketball
- Girls JV Basketball
- Girls Soccer
- Girls Softball
- Girls Tennis
- JV Cheerleading
- Lacrosse
- Swim Team
- Track & Field
- Volleyball
- Wrestling

=== Student groups ===
- Anime Club
- Book Club
- Drama Club
- Ecology
- FBLA
- Freedom Model United Nations Society
- Freshman Class
- Future Educators Association
- Junior Class
- MLK Oratory Competition
- Model United Nations
- National Honor Society
- Oceanography & Aquarium
- Peer Mediation
- SCA
- Science Club
- Senior Class
- Spanish Club
- Sophomore Class
- "Soul Squad" High Stepping Marching Eagles Band
- "Golden Silk" Color Guard
- "Black Diamonds" Dance Team

== Test scores ==
Freedom High School is not a fully accredited high school based on its performance on the Virginia SOL (Standards of Learning) tests by the Virginia Department of Education for the 2006-2007 school year.

According to the 2015 Virginia Department of Education State Accreditation and Federal Status Report, Freedom High School has a Provisionally Accredited High School status due to Graduation Rate.

Freedom High School has a continuing pledge to raising the bar on its SOL scores.

== Athletics ==
The school's mascot is the Eagles and its sports teams currently play in the AAA Cardinal District of the AAA Northwest Region. As stated above the Freedom Varsity Football Team won the VHSL 6A State Championship in the 2022-23 season, ranked 100 nationally. They began the 2023-24 season ranked 74 Nationally and 1 in Virginia.

== Notable alumni ==
- Umari Hatcher (born 2002), college football wide receiver for the Syracuse Orange
- Cameron Long (born 1988), basketball player in the Israeli Premier League

== See also ==
- Prince William County Public Schools
