= Unity Reed High School =

Coordinates: 38.7652°N 77.5084°W

Location
- 8820 Rixlew Lane; Manassas, Virginia 20109; United States

Information
- Former name: Stonewall Jackson High School (1964–2020)
- School type: Public, high school
- Founded: 1964
- School district: Prince William County Public Schools
- School number: (703) 365.2900
- Principal: Milagros Polanco
- Teaching staff: 141.29 (FTE)
- Grades: 9–12
- Enrollment: 2,452 (2021–22)
- Student to teacher ratio: 17.35
- Colors: Maroon, Gold, and White
- Mascot: Lion
- Feeder schools: Unity Braxton Middle School
- Website: unityreedhs.pwcs.edu

Unity Reed High School is a public secondary school in Bull Run, Prince William County, Virginia, near the city of Manassas. It was formerly known as Stonewall Jackson High School; the school was renamed in 2020.

== History and administration ==
=== Naming controversy ===
The school was named after Stonewall Jackson, a Confederate general. In 2017, the Prince William County Public Schools (PWCS) Board was considering renaming the school as part of a shift away from naming schools after Confederate leaders. In 2020, the PWCS Superintendent released an open letter saying, "We can no longer represent the Confederacy in our schools".

On June 29, 2020, the school board voted to rename the school to "Unity Reed High School", honoring Arthur Reed, who served as a security assistant at the school.

=== Awards and recognition ===
In May 2007, Newsweek magazine ranked Stonewall Jackson 530th in the nation on its annual list of "Best High Schools in America". In 2001, Time named Stonewall Jackson as a High School of the Year.

=== Administration ===
The principal of Unity Reed High School is Milagros Polanco. Prior to her appointment in 2024, she was the assistant principal at Gar-Field Senior High School.

== Academic programs ==
=== CTE programs ===
Unity Reed is one of 2 high schools in the district that hosts an Aviation Maintenance program (the other being Woodbridge High School). The program teaches equipment safety, maintenance publications and records, airframes, engines, and electricity. The school also has cosmetology and engineering programs. Unity Reed is also the only school in the district that hosts a Firefighting program.

=== International Baccalaureate Program ===
Unity Reed High School is an International Baccalaureate (IB) World School. They offer the IB Middle Years Programme (MYP), the IB Diploma Programme (DP), and the IB Career Related Programme (CP).

Students can take part in full IB Programs at Unity Reed High School to earn a diploma or certificate. A student can also take courses offered by the IB in their levels of strength and interest, but do not have to be part of a larger IB Program. These are known as IB/MYP Course Students. Students can be awarded college credit with IB classes, and it weighs the GPA. Unity Reed is one of two high schools that houses the IB Program in Prince William County (the other is Gar-Field Senior High School).

== Demographics ==
As of the 2023–2024 school year, the student body of 2,174 demographics were:

- Hispanic of any race: 72.4%
- Black/African-Am.: 10.7%
- White 8.0%
- Asian: 6.1%
- Two or More race: 2.4%
- Am. Indian/Alaskan: 0.2%
- Hawaiian/Pacific Isl.: 0.1%

== Notable alumni ==
- Amare Campbell, college football linebacker for the Penn State Nittany Lions
- Ibram X. Kendi, anti-racist activist
- Tim Settle, NFL player
- Greg Stroman, NFL player
- James Walkinshaw, US Representative for Virginia's 11th congressional district
- Ryan Williams, former NFL running back
- Tyleik Williams, NFL defensive tackle for the Detroit Lions

== See also ==
- Prince William County Public Schools
- Unity Braxton Middle School
