= Osbourn High School =

Location
- 1977 Eagle Way; Manassas, Virginia 20110; United States; 38°44′50″N 77°28′04″W

Information
- School type: Public, high school
- Established: 1977
- School district: Manassas City Public Schools
- Superintendent: Dr. Kevin Newman
- Principal: Dr. Jennifer Chapman
- Grades: 9–12
- Enrollment: 2,214 (2016-17)
- Colors: Navy Blue and Gray
- Athletics conference: Virginia High School League; AAA Northwest Region; Cedar Run District
- Mascot: Eagle
- Website: Osbourn High School

Osbourn High School is a public school for grades 9–12 located in Manassas, Virginia, United States and the sole high school of the Manassas City Public Schools system.

== History and administration ==
=== History ===
Osbourn High School was originally opened in 1890 as the Manassas Institute by Fannie and Eugenia Osbourn as a private school. In 1908, the Institute became part of the Virginia Public School System and was renamed the Manassas Agricultural High School. After the passing of Fannie Osbourn Metz, Eugenia Osbourn became the principal. In 1928, a new school building was opened on Lee Avenue; the school was renamed Manassas High School. Ms. Eugenia Osbourn remained principal of this high school until 1935.

In 1939, the school was renamed Osbourn High School in her honor. The building on Lee Avenue was home to Osbourn High School until the fall of 1953, when a new school was built on Tudor Lane. 22 years later, Prince William County Public Schools closed the building on Tudor Lane and students began attending a new school building on Euclid Avenue between Manassas and Manassas Park.

1975 was the year Manassas became a city. Shortly after, Manassas started its own school system. In the fall of 1977, the building at 9005 Tudor Lane reopened as Osbourn High School, a four-year high school. The eagle was chosen to be the school mascot, and navy blue and silver-gray became the school colors. Due to Manassas's rapid growth, Grace E. Metz Junior High School opened in 1990 and Osbourn became a three-year high school (grades 10-12). On November 8, 1999, students and staff moved to the current Osbourn High School. The four-year status was restored, and the graduating 8th graders from Metz came to Osbourn in September 2000 and became the class of 2004.

=== Administration ===
The new principal of Osbourn High School is Dr. Jennifer Chapman. Prior to her appointment in 2024, Chapman was an assistant principal at Forest Park High School and John R. Lewis High School.

== Academics ==
Osbourn High School has earned the Governor’s STEM Academy Designation. Students at Osbourn are also given the opportunity to attend The Governor's School at Innovation Park, a school that is housed on the Prince William County campus of George Mason University that focuses completely on a Science, technology, engineering, and mathematics curriculum.

== Athletics ==
Osbourn High School is in the 6A Cedar Run District of the Virginia High School League. The school offers Cheer, Cross Country, Field Hockey, Football, golf, basketball, indoor and outdoor track, swimming and diving, baseball, Esports, lacrosse, soccer, softball, and tennis

=== Football ===
In 2006, the Osbourn Eagles football team won the Cedar Run District Title, the Northwest Region the, and the AAA Division 6 State Championship (the highest class in the state of Virginia) with a 42-20 victory over Chantilly High School. It is the school's only state championship since joining class AAA in 1996.

== Notable alumni ==
- Brandon Hogan (2007) - former professional player
- Lucky Whitehead (2011) - professional football player
- George Zimmerman (2001) - Killer of Trayvon Martin
