= Gainesville High School (Virginia) =

Location
- 13150 University Boulevard; Gainesville, Virginia 20155; United States
- 38.7844°N 77.5936°W

Information
- Type: Public
- Founded: 2021
- School district: Prince William County Public Schools
- Principal: Neil Beech
- Grades: 9-12
- Colors: Red & gray
- Mascot: Cardinal
- Newspaper: The Cardinal Column
- Feeder schools: Gainesville Middle School, Ronald Wilson Reagan Middle School, Bull Run Middle School, Marsteller Middle School
- Website: gainesvillehs.pwcs.edu

Gainesville High School is a Prince William County, Virginia public high school in the census-designated placed, Gainesville, Virginia. Gainesville High School is the 13th High School in Prince William County Public Schools and was opened on August 21, 2021. It neighbors Gainesville Middle School which is one of its feeder schools. The school is in western Prince William County and was recently built.
