= Patriot High School (Virginia) =

Public school in Nokesville, Virginia, United States

Patriots High School

Location
- 10504 Kettle Run Road; Nokesville, (Prince William County), Virginia 20181; United States; 38°43′33″N 77°34′50″W

Information
- School type: Public
- Motto: Leadership Integrity Character Pride
- Established: 2011
- School district: Prince William County Public Schools
- Principal: David Van Gelder
- Grades: 9 through 12
- Enrollment: 2,688 (2017-18)
- Student to teacher ratio: 18.15
- Colors: Red, silver, blue
- Mascot: Pioneer
- Website: patrioths.pwcs.edu

Patriot High School is a public high school in Nokesville, Virginia, Prince William County, Virginia, United States. It is part of Prince William County Public Schools, and is located at 10504 Kettle Run Road, Nokesville, Virginia. The school opened in September 2011.

Originally simply "High School #11," Kettle Run High School was the working name of the new high school in the western portion of Prince William County, Virginia that was completed in September 2011.

Referred to in documents of July 2006 as "High School (West)," the property is named for its geographic region, located NW of Nokesville, Virginia. The school property itself is located near the intersection of Schaeffer Lane and Kettle Run Road in a triangle of land south of Vint Hill Road (Route 215) and west of Kettle Run Road.

Immediately adjoining the property is the site of an elementary school to be built concurrently. In the January 20 meeting, the school board also announced that this school would be named T. Clay Wood Elementary School .

== Background ==
Early estimates of the school's total construction cost was set at $74,000,000 as published in July 2006 by the Prince William County Schools in "Approved Capital Improvement Projects; Fiscal Year 2007-16." Following the budgetary conversations for the coming school year, in the 2006-2007 year, as published in a similar document for the 2008-16 year, the school's estimated date of opening was moved from September 2010 to September 2011, and the price was revised upwards to $95,410,000 for the school listed as "High School @ Kettle Run." After the economic downturn of late 2008, revised figures became available. Following a unanimous favorable School Board vote to award the contract to Hess Construction (who built the existing PWCS facility Freedom High school), PWCS News Release 162, dated 8 January 2008, stated the awarded construction contract had been settled upon at $70,700,000. (The total Capital Improvements Plan had allowed for $82 million for this expense, yielding a significant savings.)

According to the News Release, "The project will be paid for with bonds over the next 20 years with the impact on [2010]’s budget being $1.4 million."

The county's construction plans 11TH HS for the site are available online.

According to Prince William County Planning Commission Public Facility Review #PLN2007-00079, dated February 7, 2007, the high school's proposed capacity stands at 2,053 students. According to the same document, this falls below the recommendations of the established "Level of Service" (LOS) standard of 2,150 students. Again in the same document, it is stated that three new high schools are required by 2010, and current plans show that zero new high schools will be completed for the 2010–2011 school year.

== Enrollment ==
School Year	Capacity	Opening (9/30) Enrollment
2011-2012	2,053	1,652
2012-2013	2,053	2,277
2013-2014	2,053*	2,614
2014-2015	2,053*	2,878

  - Beginning in the 2013–2014 school year ten trailers were installed to provide additional space. 2,053 is not inclusive of the additional enrollment provided by the trailers.

== 2025 Intellectual Integrity and Administrative Controversy at Patriot High School ==
In January 2025, Patriot High School in Nokesville, Virginia, became embroiled in a high-profile controversy when its principal, Dr. Michael Bishop, was placed on involuntary administrative leave by Prince William County Public Schools. This action followed allegations that his adult son, Nathan Bishop—who had been employed within the school system—was charged with and later pleaded guilty to aggravated sexual battery of an incapacitated individual. Reports indicated that Nathan continued working for the district after the charges were filed and that neither he nor Dr. Bishop informed the school administration of the arrest, in apparent violation of district policy requiring timely disclosure. While Nathan Bishop passed a background check prior to employment, the omission of his arrest from required reporting triggered an investigation into whether proper protocols were intentionally circumvented.

== Demographics ==
In the 2017–2018 school year, Patriot's student body was:

- 11.1% Black/African American
- 15.7% Hispanic
- 53.4% White
- 12.6% Asian
- 6.8% Two or More Races
- .3% American Indian/Alaskan
- .2% Hawaiian/Pacific Islander

== Scandals ==
During the boundary process between 2008 and 2009 the communities on the eastern side of Linton Hall Road (Victory Lakes, Sheffield Manor, Crossman's Creek, Barrett's Crossing, and Lanier Farms) all expressed interest in being rezoned from Unity Reed High School to the new Patriot High School. All of the communities are in Bristow and attend Marsteller or Gainesville Middle schools, the schools which feed into Patriot High School. However, as a result of foreseen overcrowding the communities were left at Unity Reed which upset many parents and students as they were being separated from friends and area neighbors. It resulted in many transfers to other area schools notably Patriot and Brentsville.

Before the start of the 2014–2015 school year, Patriot High School closed to transfers.

In early 2017, pro-diversity posters by the school’s international club were taken down without explanation under the order of principal Michael Bishop. After a subsequent backlash, including a petition, the posters were reinstated.

== Notable alumni ==
- Victoria Haugen (2020), soccer player for the North Carolina Courage, represents Norway internationally
- Jalen Stroman (2021), NFL safety for the San Francisco 49ers

== See also ==
- Prince William County Public Schools
