= Northern Virginia Scholastic Hockey League =

The Northern Virginia Scholastic Hockey League (NVSHL) is a non-affiliated high school and middle school ice hockey league comprising teams from the Northern Virginia Area including Fairfax County, Prince William County, Loudoun County, Arlington County, Stafford County, Fauquier County, and the cities of Manassas and Alexandria. The NVSHL staff and board of directors includes a combination of coaches, parents, team representatives, referee, and rink supervisors. There are also many members who are not affiliated with and particular team or organization.

The current league executive director is Grey Bullen, and its assistant executive director is Jeff Nygaard. Bullen joined the league after Bud Sterling served the same capacity for the previous two seasons. Prior to that, the league was headed by Nygaard, who brought the league from being a part of the MSHL to its own entity, the NVSHL. Teams play a ten-game regular season, followed by a multi-round single elimination playoff tournament to determine the league champion. In the end, the league winner will have played either 13 or 14 games, depending on whether they received a bye in the first round.

== History ==
The NVSHL was created in response to a growing number of varsity-level teams in Northern Virginia. Until the inaugural 2001-02 season, teams from Northern Virginia competed in the similar Maryland Scholastic Hockey League.

The inaugural season consisted of two conferences of 12 varsity and provisional varsity (Tier-I) teams each, as well as a junior varsity (Tier-II) league. Since that season, the league has expanded to include 22 varsity, five provisional varsity, and nine junior varsity teams in the 2005-06 season. The 2005-2006 season saw the change of Tier-II to Junior Varsity to more closely reflect the standard of traditional high school sports. Additionally, the league attempts to structure the divisions within the Varsity classification to closely reflect the "Districts" used by the Virginia High School League.

NVSHL teams are not officially recognized as varsity school sports by the Commonwealth of Virginia. Only one team, Osbourn High School, has been officially recognized by its local school board, Manassas City Public Schools.

In 2012, the NVSHL introduced the middle school division to provide younger players with an opportunity to play in the NVSHL.

== Teams ==
Teams are divided into three levels: varsity, provisional varsity, and junior varsity. Varsity teams are further divided into five divisions. Four of these divisions include only varsity teams composed of players from a single school, and are divided by geographical area. These divisions are the Concorde (North) Division, Liberty (East) Division, Cardinal (South) Division, and the Dulles (West) Division. In addition, the fifth division is reserved for all provisional varsity teams (those consisting of players from more than one school). The provisional division includes teams from all geographical areas. Provisional teams may not qualify for season-ending playoffs, but do compete in regular season games versus other varsity teams. The games count toward each team's record equally with that of a game played between two varsity teams or two provisional teams. This is a matter of controversy, however, because a talented provisional team may spoil a varsity team's chance to qualify for the league playoffs by defeating them or putting the varsity team at a statistical disadvantage for the purposes of tiebreakers.

Junior varsity teams play in the junior varsity division, and do not compete in regular games versus varsity or provisional varsity teams. There is no distinction between junior varsity teams composed of players from single or multiple schools. There currently aren't playoffs for junior varsity teams. The last time playoffs were held came in 2003-04, when Forest Park defeated Paul VI. The champion is determined by season record. In years past, there have been playoffs for the junior varsity division. This division was formerly known as the Nygaard Division, named after the first executive director of the NVSHL.

The teams are realigned each season through promotion and relegation.

=== Norris Division ===
Bishop O'Connell Knights
Flint Hill Huskies
Heritage/Rock Ridge Pride/Phoenix
Loudoun Valley/Woodgrove Vikings/Wolverines
Paul VI Panthers
Tuscarora/Loudoun County Huskies/Captains

=== Smythe Division ===
Briar Woods Falcons
Broad Run Spartans
Dominion/Potomac Falls Titans/Panthers
Independence Tigers
Riverside Rams
Stone Bridge Bulldogs

=== Patrick Division ===
Battlefield Bobcats
Fauquier/Patriot Falcons/Pioneers
Gainsville Cardinals
John Champe/Lightridge Knights/Bolts
Kettle Run/Rappahannock Cougars/Panthers
Yorktown Patriots

=== Adams Division ===
Chantilly/McLean Chargers/Highlanders
Herndon/South Lakes Hornets/Seahawks
James Madison Warhawks
Langley Saxons
Oakton Cougars

=== Junior Varsity ===
Battlefield Bobcats
Briar Woods/Independence Falcons/Tigers
Chantilly/McLean Chargers/Highlanders
James Madison Warhawks
Langley Saxons
Yorktown Patriots

=== Middle School Division ===
Alexandria Titans (Alexandria)
Arlington Admirals (Arlington)
Arlington Knights Blue (Arlington)
Arlington Knights Green (Arlington)
Battlefield (Prince William)
Brambleton (Loudoun)
Briar Woods/Riverside (Loudoun)
Broad Run/Western Loudoun County HC (Loudoun)
Colgan (Prince William)
Dulles South (Loudoun)
Eastern Loudoun County (Loudoun)
Fauquier Bulldogs (Fauquier County)
Gainesville/Patriot (Prince William)
Herndon/Reston (Fairfax)
Lake Braddock (Fairfax)
Leesburg (Loudoun)
Mary Ellen Henderson (Falls Church)
McLean/Great Falls (Fairfax)
Panthers
Stafford/SOCO
Seneca Ridge/River Bend (Loudoun)
Stone Bridge (Loudoun)
Sully Spartans (Fairfax)
Vale Vikings
West Virginia Vipers

== Past champions ==
=== NVSHL Varsity (Capitals Cup) Champions ===
2024-2025 - Langley
2023-2024 - Langley
2022-2023 - Langley
2021-2022 - Langley
2020-2021 - Riverside
2019-2020 - Riverside
2018-2019 - Langley
2017-2018 - Bishop O'Connell
2016-2017 - Stone Bridge
2015-2016 - Stone Bridge
2014-2015 - Stone Bridge
2013-2014 - Briar Woods
2012-2013 - Briar Woods
2011-2012 - Stone Bridge
2010-2011 - Stone Bridge
2009-2010 - Woodbridge
2008-2009 - Bishop O'Connell
2007-2008 - Stone Bridge
2006-2007 - Osbourn Park
2005-2006 - Woodbridge
2004-2005 - North Stafford/Robinson (Co-Champions)
2003-2004 - North Stafford
2002-2003 - Stone Bridge
2001-2002 - Stone Bridge

== Records ==
=== Career ===
Goals: (96) John Litscher - 2011/12-2013/14 - Battlefield
Assists: (71)

- Cade Groton - 2012/13-2015/16 - Stone Bridge
- Nicky Grose - 2009/10-2012/13 - Fairfax

Points: (142) John Litscher - 2011/12-2013/14 - Battlefield
Hat tricks: (17) John Litscher - 2011/12-2013/14 - Battlefield
Penalty minutes: (178) Kyle Ward-Dahl - 2001/02-2004/05 - Oakton

Goals against average: (1.50) Robbie Kunka - 2001/02-2004/05 - Langley
Saves: (713) Nick Bottorff - 2001/02-2004/05 - Centreville
Save percentage: (.937) Chris Felinski - 2003 - Loudoun County
Shutouts: (3)

- Robert Kunka - 2001/02-2004/05 - Langley
- Austin Walrabenstein - 2007/08

Wins: (15) Daryl Anthony - 2001/02-2003/04 - Robinson
Record: (14-2) Bryan Lynch - 2001/02-2003/04 - Stone Bridge

=== Single Season ===
Goals: (38) John Litscher - 2013-14 - Battlefield
Assists: (33) Cade Groton - 2015-16 - Stonebridge
Points: (55) John Litscher - 2011-12 - Battlefield/Patriot
Penalty minutes: (65) Miles Miller - 2012-13 - Potomac Falls/Heritage

Goals against average: (.80) Chris Wingo - 2006-07 - Langley
Saves: (438) Nick Bottorff - 2004-05 - Centreville
Save pct.: (.952) Chris Wingo - 2006-07 - Langley
Shutouts: (5) Chris Wingo - 2006-07 - Langley
Wins: (10) Dominic Mezappesa - 2001-02 - Broad Run

=== Single Game ===
Goals: (11) Cameron Smith - vs. Centervillle/Fairfax - Yorktown - Dec 7, 2012
Assists: (7) Steven Csutoros - vs. Osbourn - Osbourn Park
Points: (11)

- Owen Morgan - vs. Loudoun County/John Champe - Chantilly - Nov 15, 2019
- Cameron Smith - vs. Centervillle/Fairfax - Yorktown - Dec 7, 2012
- John Litscher - vs. Herndon/West Springfield - Battlefield - Jan 20, 2012
- Brad Surdham - vs. Oakton - West Springfield - Jan 18, 2006
