= Dulles District =

The 4A Dulles District is a high school conference in the US state of Virginia that includes schools from Northern Virginia, with all of its full-time members from Loudoun County. 4A is the third largest enrollment class of the Virginia High School League and is typically very competitive in Virginia high school sports.

The Dulles District schools compete in the 4A West Region with the schools from Conference 21A, Conference 22, Conference 23, and Conference 24.

== History ==
The Dulles District was created in 2001 from all six Loudoun County high schools that were in the AA Northwestern District, which were Broad Run High School, Loudoun County High School, Loudoun Valley High School, Park View High School, Potomac Falls High School, and Stone Bridge High School.

The Dulles District's name is derived from the district's proximity to Washington Dulles International Airport, which is located in eastern Loudoun County.

=== Membership Changes ===
Loudoun County's growth has been a factor in creating the Dulles District as more high schools in the county were being built during the 2000s, including four new members in the district since its founding in 2001. In 2002, Heritage High School opened; in 2003, Dominion High School opened; in 2005, Briar Woods High School and Freedom High School opened. In 2005, Loudoun Valley was moved to the AAA National District and Stone Bridge moved to the AAA Liberty District because their enrollments were considerably above the AA/AAA enrollment cutoffs. In 2007, George Mason High School in Falls Church, Virginia became the first non-Loudoun County school to enter the Dulles District, though only as a part-time member for lacrosse only, as their district, the A Bull Run District did not hold enough members to sponsor it. Mason's swim team also competed in the Dulles District in the 2009–2010 season. In 2009, Heritage was moved to the AAA Cedar Run District and the AAA Northwest Region due to their increasing enrollment.

Woodgrove High School of Purcellville and Tuscarora High School of Leesburg joined the district when they opened in 2010. Loudoun Valley and Heritage returned to AA in 2011 because of the new school openings. In 2011, Broad Run and Freedom moved up to the AAA Cedar Run District.

John Champe High School joined the AA Dulles District when the school opened in 2012 and Independence High School and Lightridge High School joined the Dulles district when the schools opened in 2019 and 2020.

In the 2013–2014 school year, the Dulles District was split as a result of the overall VHSL realignment. Briar Woods, Broad Run, Freedom, Potomac Falls and Tuscarora formed the new Potomac District, while Schools in the 4A and 3A classification, Champe, Dominion, Heritage, Loudoun County, Loudoun Valley, Park View, Riverside, and Woodgrove remained in the Dulles District. Stone Bridge remained in the Liberty District.

In 2023, the VHSL split teams from the Dulles, Patomic, and Cedar Run Districts to form the Catoctin District. At the time, the members of the Dulles District were Broad Run, Dominion, Heritage, Indpendence, Lightridge, Loudoun County, Loudoun Valley, Park View, Rock Ridge, and Tuscarora. Three teams from this district (Broad Run, County, and Park View) joined the Catoctin District, while Independence and Lightridge moved up to Classes 5 and 6.

The Current Members of the Dulles District are Loudoun Valley, Heritage, Tuscarora, Dominion, and Rock Ridge.

In September 2026, the VHSL approved a request 5-0 to combine the Dulles and Catoctin District back into one conference, under the name the Dulles District. This will begin in 2027. New Members will be Broad Run, Loudoun County, Park View, and Woodgrove.

== Strengths and Notable Facts on the Dulles District ==
In 2001, the Dulles District was expected to be a football powerhouse, with Park View, the AA Division 4 runner up in 1999 and 2000 leading the way. Former Park View coach and teacher Mickey Thompson went to Stone Bridge to start up the new program there, and the Bulldogs were also expected to be another strong contender for the AA title. Both schools were very competitive in the district's initial years, but Park View's program steadily declined as players who first had Thompson at Park View graduated, and Stone Bridge moved to AAA after winning two AA Region II Division 4 titles. Loudoun Valley also made a playoff appearance in 2003 but is also in AAA. This trend has reversed this year, however, with three of the districts teams making playoff appearances (Briar Woods, Broad Run, and Park View). Broad Run has won the last two VHSL AA Division 4 state championships, in 2008 and 2009. In recent years, Briar Woods has emerged as a football powerhouse as they defeated Broad Run twice in 2010 en route to a state championship and lost once (to Broad Run) en route to a second state championship in 2011. The Falcons began the 2012 season with an early away victory at Broad Run and capped a perfect 15–0 season, rolling over Lynchburg Heritage 52–0 in the championship game to garner a third consecutive title.

Dulles District schools have been among the strongest in Virginia in softball, girls soccer, volleyball, and girls basketball, with multiple members earning AA tournament berths and AA titles since the district's founding. Boys and Girls lacrosse was offered as a varsity sport for the first time in Loudoun County high schools in 2002, and girls' field hockey may be added as well within a few years.

The biggest strength of the Dulles District as a league is not its sports however, but it is because seven out of the ten Loudoun schools routinely play each other in all sports, making the AA Dulles District the mainstay of Loudoun County athletics. In addition, the Dulles District is the only AA (and non-AAA) district with all of its members in Northern Virginia. This has also allowed more exposure on Loudoun County high school sports in the Washington area, because many Northwestern District members are located in the northern Shenandoah Valley and do not receive much exposure due to their distance from the immediate Washington area.

Dulles District members schedule non-district members primarily against schools in the AA Northwestern District and they also regularly play some high schools in the Eastern Panhandle of West Virginia, including Jefferson, Hampshire, and Musselman.

== State Champions since 2001-2002 ==
Virginia State Championships
Year	Sport/Competition	School
2001–2002	Girls Volleyball	Loudoun Valley
2001–2002	Golf	Potomac Falls
2002	Softball	Park View
2002	Boys Tennis	Potomac Falls
2003	Girls Tennis	Loudoun County
2003	Softball	Loudoun Valley
2004	Girls Soccer	Potomac Falls
2004–2005	Cheerleading	Stone Bridge
2004–2005	Girls Volleyball	Loudoun Valley
2005	Softball	Loudoun Valley
2005	Girls Soccer	Stone Bridge
2006	Boys Tennis	Loudoun County
2006	Boys Soccer	Potomac Falls
2007	Girls Track and Field	Park View
2007	Softball	Broad Run
2007	Girls Volleyball	Loudoun County
2008	Softball	Broad Run
2008	Girls Soccer	Broad Run
2008	Girls Track and Field	Park View
2008	Girls Volleyball	Loudoun County
2008	Football	Broad Run
2008–2009	Division 4 Girls Basketball	Loudoun County
2008–2009	Division 3 Girls Basketball	Freedom
2009	Softball	Broad Run
2009	Girls Soccer	Broad Run
2009	Girls Volleyball	Loudoun County
2009	Cheerleading	Briar Woods
2009	Football	Broad Run
2009–2010	Division 4 Girls Basketball	Freedom
2009–2010	Division 4 Boys Basketball	Potomac Falls
2010	Cheerleading	Briar Woods
2010	Football	Briar Woods
2011	Division 4 Boys Basketball	Potomac Falls
2011	Girls Soccer	Broad Run
2011	Softball	Briar Woods
2011	Cheerleading	Briar Woods
2011	Football	Briar Woods
2012	Softball	Woodgrove
2012	Girls Soccer	Woodgrove
2016	Cheerleading	Riverside
2017	Marching Band	Riverside
2017	Girls Swimming	Riverside
2017	Boys Soccer	Riverside
2017	Boys Lacrosse	Riverside
2018	Marching Band	Riverside
2018	Girls Lacrosse	Riverside
2018	Boys Tennis	Riverside
2018	Football	Woodgrove
2019	Boys Lacrosse	Riverside

== Total Number of State Championships ==
Virginia State Championships
School	No. of Titles	Founded
Loudoun County	6	1954
Loudoun Valley	4	1963
Park View	3	1976
Heritage	0	2002
Dominion	0	2003
Woodgrove	3	2010
Riverside	9	2015

== 2011-2012 District Champions ==
Fall Sports Regular Season Champions

- Cheerleading: Briar Woods Falcons
- Boys Cross Country: Loudoun County Raiders
- Girls Cross Country: Potomac Falls Panthers
- Golf: Dominion Titans (Season) - Briar Woods Falcons (Tournament)
- Football: Briar Woods Falcons
- Volleyball: Loudoun County Raiders

Winter Sports Regular Season Champions

- Boys Basketball: Potomac Falls Panthers
- Girls Basketball: Loudoun County Raiders
- Girls Gymnastics: Freedom Eagles
- Boys Swimming: Broad Run Spartans
- Girls Swimming: Briar Woods Falcons
- Wrestling: Freedom Eagles

Spring Sports Regular Season Champions

- Baseball: Potomac Falls Panthers
- Boys Lacrosse: Briar Woods Falcons
- Girls Lacrosse: Woodgrove Wolverines
- Boys Soccer: Broad Run Spartans
- Girls Soccer: Broad Run Spartans
- Softball: Briar Woods Falcons
- Boys Tennis: Freedom Eagles
- Girls Tennis: Broad Run Spartans
- Boys Track: Loudoun County Raiders
- Girls Track: Briar Woods Falcons

== District Champions ==
=== Football ===
Year	Team	Record (In District)	Playoffs
2001	Park View	5-0	W Charlotesville L Liberty Bealton
2002	Park View	5-0	L Faquier
2003	Stone Bridge		Won Regionals vs Liberty Bealton Lost in State Semifinal to Powhatan
2004	Stone Bridge	7-0	W vs Louisa County 42-7 L vs Harrisonburg 3-14
2005	Park View	4-1	L @ Harrisonburg 13-28
2006	Park View	5-0	L vs Louisa County 21-24
2007	Broad Run	7-0	L vs Park View 12-16
2008	Broad Run	6-0	W vs Loudoun County 48-28 W vs Potomac Falls 33-6 W vs Chancellor 24-12 W vs Amherst County 13-0 State Champions
2009	Broad Run	6-0	W vs Liberty Bealton 34-27 W vs Sherando 36-13 W @ Powhatan 20-7 W vs Amherst County 21-16 State Champions
2010	Briar Woods	6-0	W vs Liberty Bealton 7-0 W vs Broad Run 24-21 W vs Courtland 52-8 W vs Harrisonburg 41-21 State Champions
2011	Briar Woods	4-0	W vs Park View 49-21 W vs Loudoun County 29-21 W vs Powhatan 21-7 W vs Grafton 31-0 W vs Christanburg 28-26 State Champions
2012	Briar Woods	8-0	W vs Powhatan 34-7 W vs Liberty Bealton 42-14 W vs Loudoun County 31-0 W vs Courtland 45-15 W vs Heritage Lynchburg 52-0 State Champions
2013	Woodgrove/Loudoun Valley	5-1	
2014	Woodgrove		
2015	John Champe*		
2016	Woodgrove	8-0	W vs Charlottesville 57-8 L vs Dominion 23-30
2017	Dominion	5-1	L @ Sherando 10-27
2018	Woodgrove	5-0	W vs Loudoun County 28-21 W vs Sherando 27-3 W vs Blacksburg 26-23 (OT) W vs Lake Taylor 38-33 State Champions
2019	Broad Run	5-0	W vs Millbrook 32-26 W vs Loudoun Valley 28-14 L vs Tuscarora 7-30
2020	Tuscarora	5-0	W vs John Handley 56-0 W vs Broad Run 21-13 L vs Salem 14-21
2021	Broad Run	7-0	
2022	Loudoun County	7-0	W vs John Handley 42-13 W vs Sherando 49-28 L vs Kettle Run 34-35
2023	Tuscaraora	6-0	W vs Loudoun County 28-16 W vs John Champe 24-21 L vs Salem 21-31
2024	Tuscarora	4-0	W vs Loudoun County 34-7 W vs John Champe 41-16 L @ Varina 0-26
2025	Loudoun Valley	4-0	W vs Woodgrove 31-21 L @ Loudoun County 14-28
2026	Loudoun Valley	4-0	Plays vs Loudoun County

Count:

Team	#	Years
Broad Run	5	2007, 2008, 2009, 2019, 2021
Park View	4	2001, 2002, 2005, 2006
Woodgrove	3	2013, 2014, 2016, 2018
Tuscarora	3	2020, 2023, 2024
Loudoun Valley	3	2022, 2025, 2026
Briar Woods	3	2010, 2011, 2012
Stone Bridge	2	2003, 2004
Dominion	1	2017
Loudoun County	1	2022
John Champe	1	2015

*Unconfirmed

== Member schools ==
- Broad Run Spartans, Ashburn
- Dominion Titans, Sterling
- Heritage Pride, Leesburg
- Independence Tigers, Ashburn
- Lightridge Lightning, Aldie
- Loudoun County Captains, Leesburg
- Loudoun Valley Vikings, Purcellville
- Park View Patriots, Sterling
- Tuscarora Huskies, Leesburg
- Rock Ridge Phoenix, Ashburn

== Former Dulles Members ==
- Freedom High School, played from 2005 to 2011
- Stone Bridge High School, played from 2001 to 2005
- Briar Woods Falcons, Ashburn
- John Champe Knights, Aldie
- Potomac Falls Panthers, Sterling
- Riverside Rams, Leesburg
- Rock Ridge Phoenix, Ashburn
- George Mason Mustangs, Falls Church (Only for lacrosse and swimming)
- Woodgrove Wolverines, Purcellville
