= Potomac District (VHSL) =

High school sports conference

The Potomac District is a high school conference in the United States Virginia High School League that is made up of mostly schools from Loudoun County that have a high enrollment capacity.

== History of the District ==
=== Original District ===
The original Potomac District was founded in 1965 when the Northern Region expanded from two to three districts along with the Alexandria District and the Northern District. The original charter members of the district were Langley, Marshall, McLean, J.E.B. Stuart, Wakefield, Washington-Lee and Yorktown. The district lasted until 1972 due to low membership but was revived in 1975 and then disbanded again in 1994 when the Northern Region realigned the districts.

=== Current District ===
In 2015, the current Potomac District was revived to alleviate crowding within the Dulles District and for schools in Loudoun County with a higher enrollment. With the opening of Tuscarora in 2010 and the increasing enrollment by Briar Woods, Broad Run, Stone Bridge and Potomac Falls, led to the district's creation. The result made the Dulles District only have schools in Class 4A or below.

Loudoun County schools continued the grow in population and as of 2019-2020 year, the Potomac District was composed of 5A Schools with the lone exception of Broad Run. Woodgrove and Riverside schools were added to the district. John Champe, became a 6A school and moved to the Cedar District. Tuscarora remained 4A and moved to the Dulles District.

== Member History ==
=== Current members ===
- Briar Woods Falcons of Ashburn
- Freedom Eagles of South Riding
- John Champe Knights of Aldie
- Potomac Falls Panthers of Sterling
- Riverside Rams of Leesburg
- Stone Bridge Bulldogs of Ashburn
- Lightridge Lightning of Aldie

=== Former members ===
- Annandale Atoms of Annandale (1977-1994)
- Chantilly Chargers of Chantilly (1982-1988)
- Fairfax Rebels of Fairfax (1975-1994)
- Falls Church Jaguars of Falls Church (1975-1994)
- George C. Marshall Statesmen of Falls Church (1965-1967, 1975-1977)
- George Washington Presidents of Alexandria (1967-1971) Now serves as a Middle School
- Hammond Admirals of Alexandria (1967-1971) Now serves as a Middle School
- Independence Tigers of Ashburn (2021-2025)
- J.E.B. Stuart Raiders of Falls Church (1965-1967, 1975-1994)
- James Madison Warhawks of Vienna (1975-1977)
- Langley Saxons of McLean (1965-1967)
- McLean Highlanders of McLean (1965-1967)
- Oakton Cougars of Oakton (1975-1977)
- T.C. Williams Titans of Alexandria (1967-1972)
- Thomas Jefferson Colonials of Alexandria (1977-1987)
- Thomas Jefferson S&T Colonials of Alexandria (1987-1988)
- Tuscarora Huskies of Leesburg (2015-2019)
- W.T. Woodson Cavaliers of Fairfax (1977-1980)
- Wakefield Warriors of Arlington (1965-1972, 1977-1994)
- Washington-Lee Generals of Arlington (1965-1972, 1988-1994)
- Yorktown Patriots of Arlington (1965-1972, 1988-1994)
- Woodgrove Wolverines of Purcellville (2019-2023)
