= Potomac Falls High School =

Location
- 46400 Algonkian Parkway; Sterling, Virginia 20165; 39°03′07″N 77°23′25″W

Information
- School type: Public high school
- Founded: 1997
- Locale: Suburban, Large
- School district: Loudoun County Public Schools
- NCES District ID: 5102250
- Superintendent: Dr. Aaron Spence
- NCES School ID: 510225001627
- Principal: Dr. Tara Woolever
- Teaching staff: 139.25 (on an FTE basis)
- Grades: 9–12
- Enrollment: 1,662 (2024–25)
- Student to teacher ratio: 11.94
- Language: English
- Color
- Mascot: Panther
- Communities served: Countryside; Dulles Town Center; Cascades; Broad Run Farms
- Feeder schools: River Bend Middle School; Algonkian Elementary School; Potowmack Elementary School; Countryside Elementary School; Horizon Elementary School; Sterling Elementary School
- Rivals: Dominion High School; Park View High School; Broad Run High School
- Athletic Conference: Dulles District; Region II
- Website: https://www.lcps.org/o/pfh

Potomac Falls High School is a public secondary school in Sterling, Virginia unincorporated area in Loudoun County. The school is part of the Loudoun County Public Schools system.

== History ==
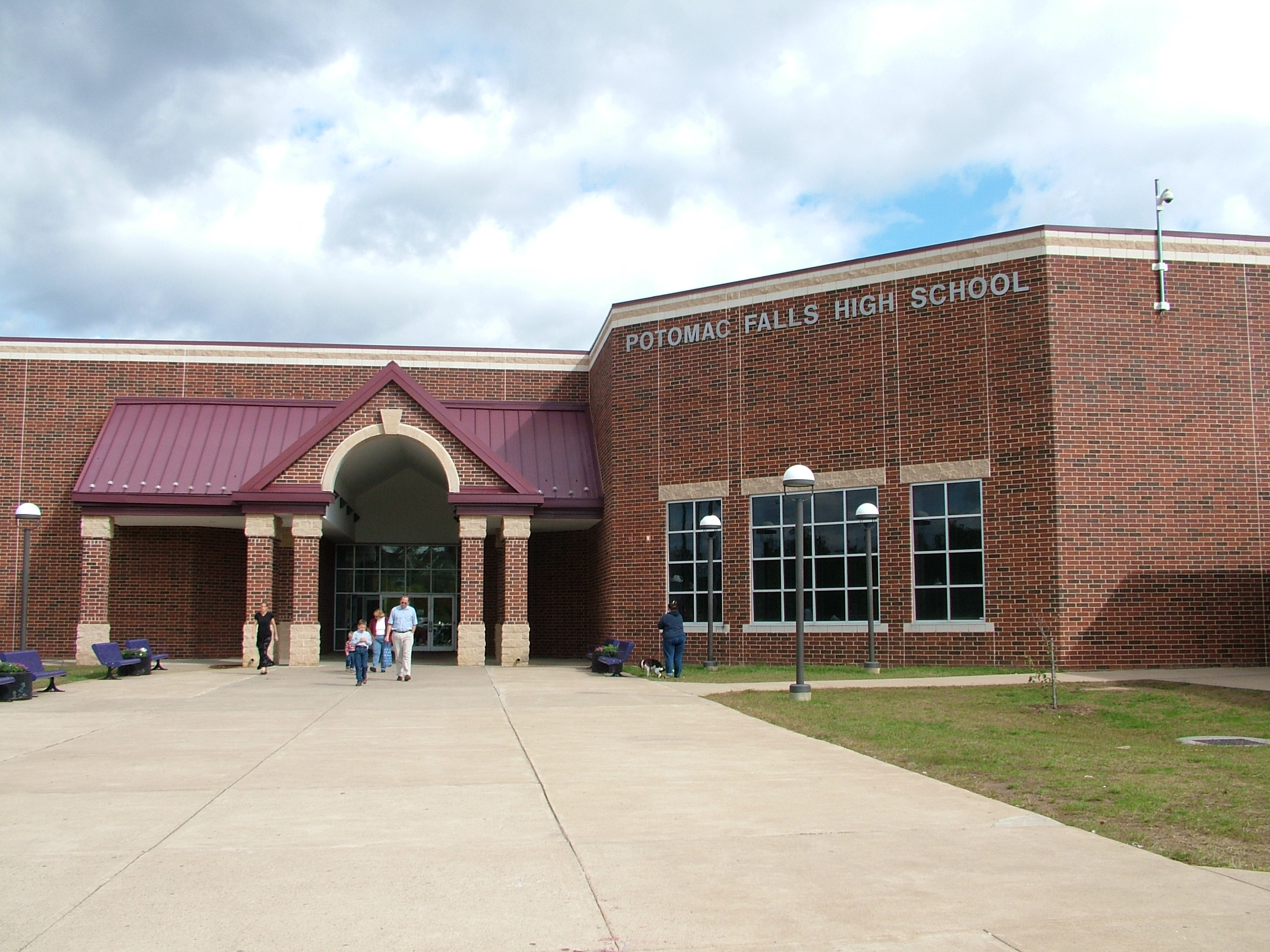
Front of Potomac Falls High School

Potomac Falls High School opened in 1997. It was the first high school built in the county in 21 years, following Park View's opening in 1976.

The high school design for Potomac Falls has been used for every new high school built in Loudoun County since then. Stone Bridge opened in 2000 with Potomac Falls' design, but with a larger auditorium and some additional classrooms. Heritage, Dominion, Briar Woods, Freedom, Woodgrove, Tuscarora, John Champe, also all use the same design. The design remained but was updated for Rock Ridge and Riverside.

=== Lawsuits ===
Demmon v. Loudoun County Public Schools, 342 F.Supp.2d 474 (E.D. Va. 2004) – As a fundraiser, a parent organization offered parents and community members the opportunity to purchase and order inscriptions for paving bricks to be placed in a sidewalk around the flagpoles at Potomac Falls High School. Purchasers could choose text and/or symbols to be inscribed on the bricks. Some purchasers paid to have their bricks inscribed with a Latin cross. After one parent complained, school officials removed from the walkway every brick containing a cross symbol.

Case Status – The court held that free speech rights of parents were violated where the school removed bricks inscribed with a Latin cross. The court held that symbols were not school-sponsored speech; and that a walkway where the bricks were displayed constituted a designated or limited public forum and that the school engaged in prohibited “viewpoint discrimination.” The bricks were later reinstated.

== Demographics ==
In the 2018-2019 year there were 1,634 students enrolled in Potomac Falls High School.

Enrollment by race/ethnicity was 50.67% White, 22.34% Hispanic, 12.73% Asian, 8.63% Black, and 5.63% other.

Enrollment by gender was 52.39% Male and 47.61% Female.

Enrollment By Grade
	9th	10th	11th	12th
Students	437	373	413	411

== Accreditation and test scores ==
=== Accreditation ===
Potomac Falls is a fully accredited high school based on its overall performance on the Standards of Learning tests in Virginia.

=== SAT scores ===
The average SAT score in 2006 for Potomac Falls was a 1,555 (532 in Math; 517 in Critical Reading; 506 in Writing).

School Year	Mathematics	Critical Reading	Writing	Total
2000–2001	515	516	n/a	1,031
2001–2002	526	531	n/a	1,057
2002–2003	531	528	n/a	1,059
2003–2004	533	534	n/a	1,067
2004–2005	542	534	n/a	1,076
2005–2006	532	517	506	1,555 (1,049 M & CR)

== Enrollment history ==
School Year	Number of Students
1997–1998	858
1998–1999	1,216
1999–2000	1,380
2000–2001	1,506
2001–2002	1,579
2002–2003	1,641
2003–2004	1,414
2004–2005	1,405
2005–2006	1,455
2006–2007	1,488
2007–2008	1,503
2008–2009	1,533
2009–2010	1,538
2010–2011	1,504
2011–2012	1,521
2012–13	1,550
2013–14	1,560
2014–15	1,611
2015–16	1,633
2017–18	1,665
2018–19	1,634

== Extracurricular activities ==
=== Band ===
The Potomac Falls band has earned the title of Virginia Honor Band by the Virginia Band and Orchestra Directors Association (VBODA) over eight times since its opening in 1997 (1998–2014)(2012), attaining overall "superior" ratings at both the State Marching Band Festival each of those years.

== Notable alumni ==
- Jalen Coker, football wide receiver for the Holy Cross Crusaders. Played for the Carolina Panthers during the 2024 season. (2020 graduate)
- Bret Halsey, played college soccer at the University of Virginia, defender for Real Salt Lake and FC Cincinnati 2. (2018 graduate)
- Matt McLean, won a gold medal in swimming at the 2012 London Olympics. (2006 graduate)
- Nate Savino, played college baseball at the University of Virginia, professional baseball pitcher for the Arizona Diamondbacks. (2019 graduate)
- Conor Shanosky, played for DC United 2009–2014. (2009 graduate)
- Adrian Tracy, played college football at William & Mary and later played for the New York Giants. (2005 graduate)
