= Heritage High School (Leesburg, Virginia) =

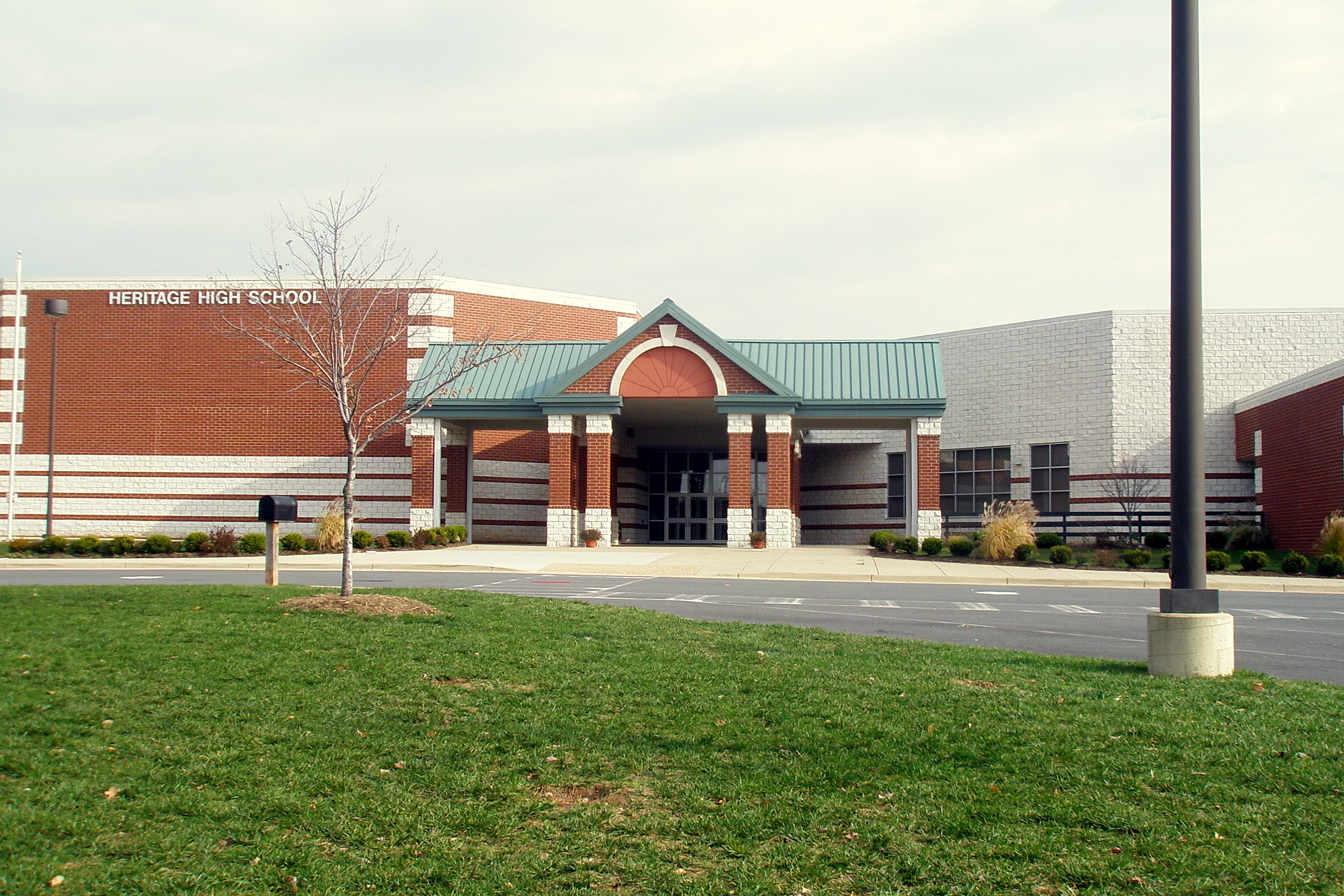

Location
- 520 Evergreen Mill Road, SE; Leesburg, Virginia 20175
- 39.0843556°N 77.5712951°W

Information
- School type: Public High School
- Founded: 2002
- School district: Loudoun County Public Schools
- Principal: Jeff Adam
- Grades: 9–12
- Enrollment: 1,417 (2016-17)
- Language: English
- Campus: Suburban
- Colors: Red & Black
- Mascot: Pride
- Communities served: Potomac Station; Tavistock Farms; River Creek; Village of Leesburg; Oaklawn; Stratford
- Feeder schools: Cool Spring Elementary; John W. Tolbert Jr. Elementary; Richard and Mildred Loving Elementary; Ball's Bluff Elementary; Frederick Douglass Elementary; Harper Park Middle School
- Rival School: Loudoun County High School Riverside High School Tuscarora High School
- Athletic Conference: Dulles District; 4A North Region – Conference 21B
- Website: www.lcps.org/o/hth

Heritage High School is a public secondary school located in Leesburg, Virginia, and is part of Loudoun County Public Schools. The principal is Jeff Adam. Its naming broke the previous tradition of naming high schools with two words prior to "High School" (Loudoun County High School, Broad Run High School, etc.).

Though Heritage is located in the southern border of Leesburg, adjacent to J. Lupton Simpson Middle School and Evergreen Mill Elementary School, it does not serve the southern Leesburg community. Instead, Heritage serves the densely populated eastern section of Leesburg, including the Sycamore Hill, Potomac Station, Tavistock Farms, Kincaid Forest, Red Rock, Spring Lakes neighborhoods and River Creek communities.

== History ==
Heritage opened in 2002 for the eastern Leesburg community, feeding most of its students from Stone Bridge High School and the rest from Loudoun County High School. It was originally expected that Simpson's 8th graders would feed into Heritage, but instead, boundary lines were drawn to have Harper Park Middle School feed into Heritage. The lines were drawn and are still drawn to the point where students who live in communities adjacent to Heritage do not go there for high school and instead go to Loudoun County High.

Like other new high schools that opened in Loudoun County before it, such as Stone Bridge and Potomac Falls, Heritage opened without a senior class, and juniors were allowed to choose which school they wanted to graduate from. Most Heritage students came from the Stone Bridge attendance area, and many rising juniors (Class of 2004) at Stone Bridge chose to stay there rather than go to Heritage. This was somewhat understandable because Leesburg students at Stone Bridge in the class of 2004 attended J.L. Simpson Middle School for 6th and 7th grade (1997–1999); went to a brand new Harper Park Middle School for 8th grade (1999–2000); went to a brand new Stone Bridge for their first two years of high school (2000–2002); and then were expected to go to another new school for their last two years. Constant boundary adjustments may have contributed to the large number of rising juniors who wished to remain at Stone Bridge. Consequently, the junior class at Heritage was only about 110 members, rather than about 250 if all juniors were required to go to the new school. In 2010, Heritage switched some of its students to Tuscarora High School in order to alleviate overcrowding.

Of the 312 students in the graduating class of 2006, 112 received the governor's seal on an Advanced Studies diploma, one of the highest academic honors offered by the Commonwealth of Virginia. Like other Loudoun County high schools, Heritage participates in the Advanced Placement program and offers numerous AP courses.

== Accreditation and test scores ==
=== Accreditation ===
Heritage High School is a fully accredited high school based on the Standards of Learning tests in Virginia.

=== SAT scores ===
The average SAT score in 2006 for Heritage was a 1,532 (518 in math; 515 in critical reading; 499 in writing).

School Year	Mathematics	Critical Reading	Writing	Total
2003–2004	485	490	n/a	975
2004–2005	527	523	n/a	1,050
2005–2006	518	515	499	1,532 (1,033 M & CR)

== Enrollment history ==
School Year	Number of Students
2002–2003	747
2003–2004	1,095
2004–2005	1,340
2005–2006	1,500
2006–2007	1,617
2007–2008	1,746
2008–2009	1,807
2009–2010	1,901
2010–2011	1,327
2011–2012	1,197
2012–2013	1,198

== Athletics ==
The mascot is the Pride, in the shape of a Lion. Heritage's sports teams currently play in the Dulles District and Region II of the Virginia High School League. The Pride opened as a member of this district.

=== Basketball ===
The school is well known for its boys' basketball team which consistently has made it to Region II playoffs, Its 2006 team was the first undefeated team in the history of the Dulles District. The Pride boys' basketball team has won 3 consecutive Dulles District Championships: 2006, 2007, and 2008. The girls’ basketball team won the VHSL championship in 2025.

=== Soccer ===
The boys' soccer team did well in the 2006 season, shaking off the new school reputation, with the Pride's soccer team making it to the AA State Semifinals before falling 2–1 to AA Dulles District champion Potomac Falls. A tenacious rivalry would develop between the two teams, who met five times that season with the Panthers going 4–0–1, including wins over the Pride in the Dulles District Tournament Finals, the Region II Finals, and the State Semifinals.

They finished Second place in the 2007 Regular Season after topping Potomac Falls for a period, who had suffered a tie to Loudoun County and a tie 2–2 to the Pride. However, Potomac Falls would end any chance of Pride Silverware by beating them 0–3 in a heated game away near the end of the season. In the Dulles District Tournament, the Pride finished in Second after a heart breaking overtime loss to Loudoun County finishing 2–1; ending the campaign early.

Two years later in 2010, Coach Betsey Munson and a new squad would go on to make another run, finishing in Second place for the Regular Season and making it to the Post-Season Tournament Final, but this time in the AAA Cedar Run District. In the Tournament Final, they narrowly missed out losing to Battlefield 1–2; Jake Flanagan scored the Pride’s lone goal unassisted. Having finished Second in both competitions the Pride would advance and make an away Regional Appearance.

In 2013, Coach Munson claimed the state record for having the most wins as a female coach in Virginia High School League history for boys soccer.

The Pride defeated Park View 3–0 and became Regular District Champions for the second time from a hat-trick by Gio Vasquez against Park View in 2015

=== Lacrosse ===
The Heritage boys' lacrosse team did well in the 2007 and 2008 seasons, finishing 15–3 and 14–3 respectively. They were tournament champions in 2007 and regular season champions in 2008. The class of 2008 has had the strongest class in school history and graduated with the most wins in school history. The class of 2008 also had 3 members go on to play collegiately at the NCAA level.

=== Cross Country ===
In 2015, Heritage High School's Girls Cross Country Team won the Class 4A Championships at Great Meadow. A key reason for this success was a first-place individual finish by Weini Kelati, in a 5k time of 17:22. Overall, the team finished with a score of 86, 17 points lower than 2nd place Loudoun Valley.

=== Other Sports ===
Heritage teams did surprisingly well in the 2005–2006 year. Both the girls' and boys' track teams won their respective AA Dulles District Titles. The football team also had its first winning season in the 2005–2006 school year, with a 7–3 record, sharing the Dulles District title with Park View High School, but unable to make the playoffs because Park View had more power points in the Virginia High School League’s rating system. in 2015, third year head coach Reed Prosser helped the Pride to a 6–4 record, after starting 6–0, and to a playoff appearance.

The Heritage girls' varsity swim and dive team have made a vast improvement over the season of 2014–2015. Seeing as the girls have placed first in the Conference 21 meet, taking first at regionals was an even bigger step. To finish up the season, the team placed third in the 4A Northern Virginia Annual States meet. There were also many record-breakers for swimmers on the Heritage varsity swim and dive team in the 2014–2015 season.

In 2025, the Heritage baseball team won the VHSL Championship against Woodgrove High School. In doing so, coach Nolan Potts and players Aaron Van Tuyle and Cooper Miskelly were named State Coach of the Year, and all state players, respectively.

== Arts ==
=== Marching Band ===
The Pride of Heritage Marching Band competes in the 2A division of USBands. They placed 2nd in the state and 8th at nationals in 2017. In 2018 the band placed second in the state again, while winning the overall music caption award. In 2019, the band placed 6th in the state along with also receiving the overall music award.

== Notable alumni ==
- Weini Kelati, long-distance runner, member of Dark Sky Distance, winner of the 2019 NCAA Division I Cross Country Championships
- Adam Fuhrmann, Major in the US Air Force and member of the 2025 NASA Astronaut class
