= Loudoun County High School =

Public high school in Virginia, US

Coordinates: 39°6′37.89″N 77°34′47.02″W

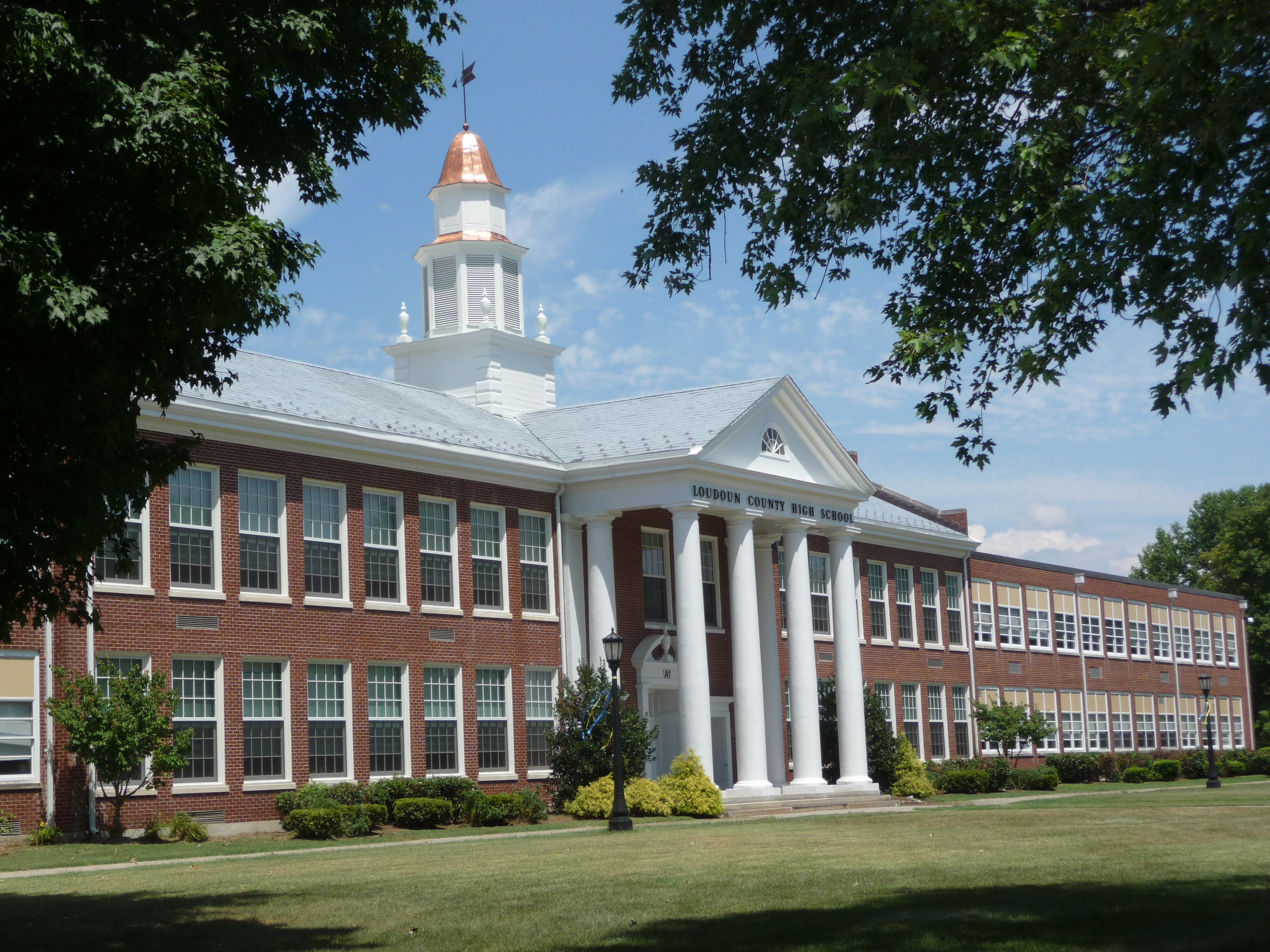

Location
- 415 Dry Mill Road, SW; Leesburg, Virginia 20175

Information
- School type: Public high school
- Founded: 1954
- School district: Loudoun County Public Schools
- Principal: Michelle Luttrell
- Grades: 9–12
- Enrollment: 1,498 (2016-17)
- Language: English
- Campus: Suburban
- Colors: Navy Blue and Gold
- Mascot: Captains
- Communities served: Woodlea Manor; Leesburg Country Club; Red Cedar; Courtland Rural Village; Shenstone; Evergreen Meadows; Meadowbrook Farm; Greenway Farm
- Feeder schools: Catoctin Elementary; Evergreen Mill Elementary; Sycolin Creek Elementary; Frederick Douglass Elementary; J.L. Simpson Middle School
- Rival Schools: Heritage High School; Loudoun Valley High School; Tuscarora High School; Rock Ridge High School
- Athletic Conference: Dulles District; Region II
- Website: https://lcps.org/o/lch

Loudoun County High School is a public secondary school in Leesburg, Virginia. It is part of Loudoun County Public Schools.

== History ==
The school opened in 1954, which makes it the oldest operating high school in Loudoun County.

=== Mascot ===
The previous mascot for the school, the Raider, was named after the Mosby's Raiders. The mascot was chosen by a segregated student body in 1954. The original school seal depicted the Raider on horseback with a Confederate Battleflag in his hands. This logo was changed to the current design in response to criticism over the emblem.

Previous attempts to remove the mascot were made in the 1970s and 1990s. Amid the George Floyd protests in 2020, alumni started a petition to change the mascot. On June 30, 2020, the Loudoun County School Board officially removed the mascot. The new mascot, the Captains, was adopted on September 2, 2020.

=== Murals ===
In 1957 murals that illustrate important events and times in Loudoun County's history were painted in the Auditorium by the Loudoun Sketch Club. Two subsequent murals were created, one in the 1970s, the other in 2004 (commemorating the school's fiftieth year in operation).

=== Renovations ===
County has undergone several renovations and expansions since it was opened. The first expansion occurred in 1966, with the addition of a Vocational Education Wing attached to the side of the front portion of the building (Vocational Education has since moved to C.S. Monroe Technology Center).

In 2002, two high school seniors set an assistant principal's office on fire, closing school for a week. Because of the fire's damage, the school had to replace its old-fashioned bell system with an electronic one that the other five high schools at that time used. The main office was renovated before the end of the 2001–2002 school year.

=== Segregation ===
County originally opened up as a segregated school for whites. Black students went to Douglass High School. In the 1968–1969 school year, County became fully integrated.

== NJROTC ==
The Naval Junior Reserve Officers Training Corps (NJROTC) program at Loudoun County High School was established during the 2009–2010 academic year, making it the first and only JROTC program within the Loudoun County Public Schools (LCPS) system.

Although housed at Loudoun County High School in Leesburg, the program is open to eligible students from across the county, including those enrolled at other LCPS high schools. Transportation is typically coordinated by families or individual schools, and cadets may participate while remaining enrolled at their home school.

The NJROTC program aims to instill the values of citizenship, service to the United States, personal responsibility, and a sense of accomplishment. It is led by retired U.S. Navy personnel and follows a curriculum that includes:

- Naval science and maritime history
- Leadership development and character education
- Physical fitness training
- Military customs, uniform wear, and drill instruction

Cadets wear Navy-issued uniforms once a week and are evaluated on grooming, discipline, and participation. Extracurricular opportunities include color guard, drill team, marksmanship, and community service projects.

While participation in NJROTC does not incur any military obligation, students who complete the program may receive advanced enlistment rank if they choose to join the military. Cadets may also become eligible for college ROTC scholarships or nominations to U.S. service academies.

All textbooks, uniforms, and training materials are provided at no cost to students, courtesy of the U.S. Navy.

== Accreditation and test scores ==
=== Accreditation ===
Loudoun County High School is a fully accredited high school based on its overall performance on the Standards of Learning tests in Virginia. In 1958, The school was evaluated and accredited by the Southern Association of Colleges and Schools.

=== SAT Scores ===
The average SAT score in 2006 for Loudoun County was a 1,100 (531 in Math; 537 in Critical Reading).

== Athletics ==
The Loudoun County girls' volleyball team has won state championships from 2007 to 2010 and again from 2012 to 2017.

=== Athletic facilities ===
The Captains have a stadium which features a 400m track and a multipurpose AstroTurf field. Beside the stadium is a practice field on grass which has field goal posts and soccer nets. Other outside facilities include 6 tennis courts, a baseball field, a softball field and a marching band practice field. Inside is a weight room and a wrestling/gymnastics facility.

=== State championships ===
Girls Basketball State Championship Games
Year	Winning Team		Losing Team		Class
2009	Loudoun County	63	Turner Ashby	47	AA Div. 4

Girls Soccer State Championship Games
Year	Winning Team		Losing Team		Class
1999	Jamestown	2	Loudoun County	1	AA
2010	Broad Run	2	Loudoun County	0	AA
2012	Woodgrove	3	Loudoun County	0	AA
2015	Loudoun County	3	Heritage	1	4A

Softball State Championship Games
Year	Winning Team		Losing Team		Class
1993	Rustburg	2	Loudoun County	0	AA

Boys Tennis State Championships
Year	Winning Team		Losing Team		Class
1999	Heritage	5	Loudoun County	4	AA
2006	Loudoun County	5	Hidden Valley	4	AA

Scholastic Bowl State Championship Games
Year	Winning Team		Losing Team		Class
2014	Loudoun County	805	Woodgrove	505	Division 4
2015	Woodgrove	800	Loudoun County	795	Division 4
2017	Loudoun County	300	Jamestown	90	Division 4

Girls Tennis State Championships
Year	Winning Team		Losing Team		Class
1988	Radford	6	Loudoun County	3	AA

Girls Track State Championship
Year	Winning Team		Losing Team		Class
1975	Orange	44.0	Loudoun County	38.0	AA

Volleyball State Championship Games
Year	Winning Team		Losing Team		Class
2006	Cave Spring	26, 25, 25	Loudoun County	24, 23, 19	AA
2007	Loudoun County	28, 25, 17, 23, 15	Grafton	26, 16, 25, 25, 12	AA
2008	Loudoun County	31, 25, 29	Hidden Valley	29, 21, 27	AA
2009	Loudoun County	25, 25, 25	Grafton	17, 12, 10	AA
2010	Loudoun County	25, 25, 25	Grafton	16, 18, 16	AA

== Band ==
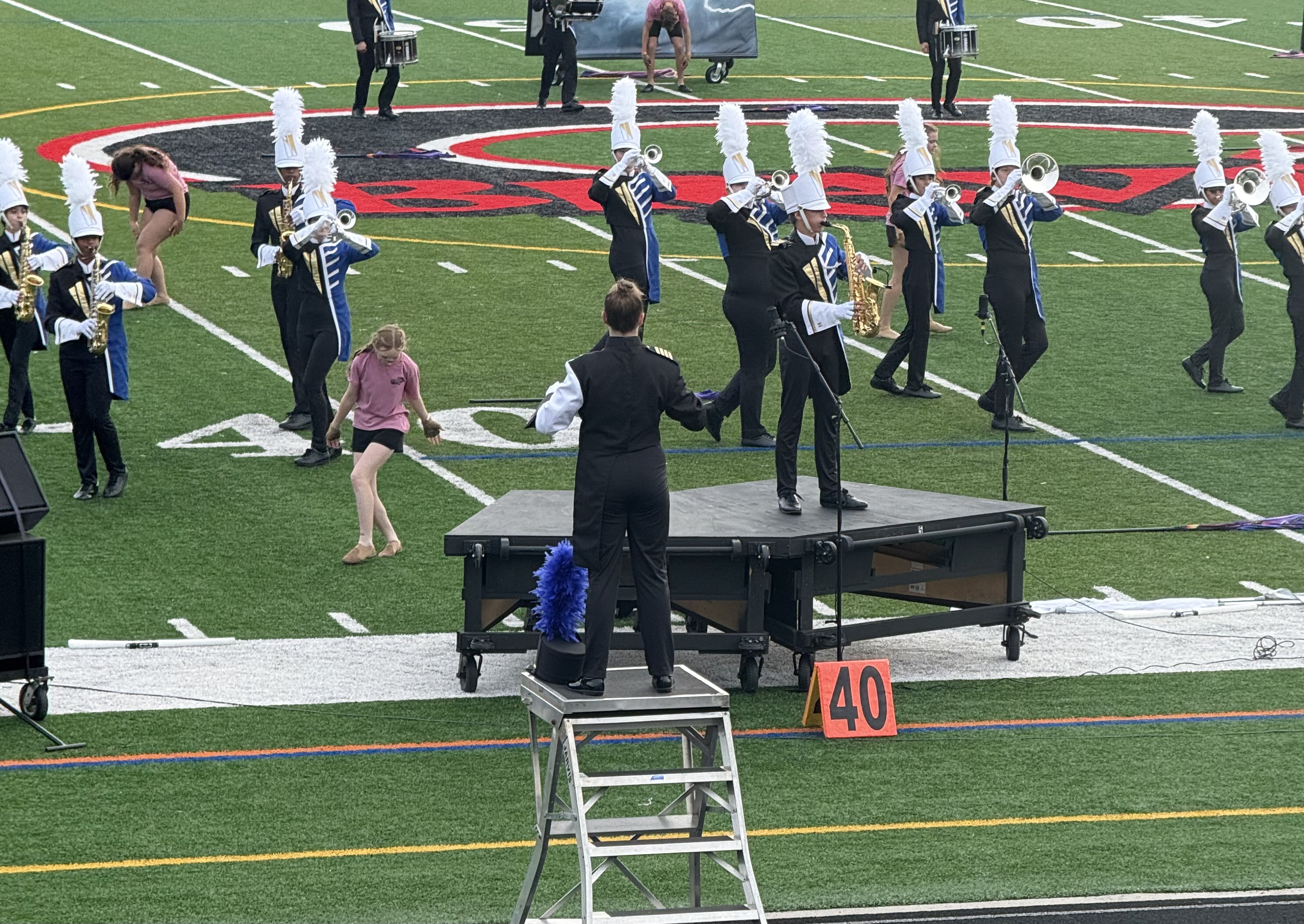
The Loudoun County High School Marching Band performing their 2025 show, "The Silver Lining," at a USBands event at Chopticon High School.

The Loudoun County Captain Band, formerly Loudoun County Raider Band, has been a Virginia honor band every year since 2004. The marching band won the 4A USBands National Championship in 2018 and 5A USBands National Championships in 2019 with the highest score of all time in the A class division. The Marching Captains have gone on to win the USBands 4A national championship in 2021 and the 4 Open national championships in 2023.

== Notable alumni ==
- Billy Hurley III, professional golfer
- Steve Arhancet, Team Liquid
- Bill Moravek, footballer and coach, scout for Fulham F.C.
- Ellen Urbani, author and book reviewer
- Will Toledo, singer-songwriter and multi-instrumentalist of indie rock band Car Seat Headrest
