= Riverside High School (Loudoun County, Virginia) =

Location
- 19019 Upper Belmont Place; Leesburg, Virginia 20176; 39.0906644°N 77.4932563°W

Information
- School type: Public high school
- Motto: Respect, Advocate, Motivate, Serve
- Founded: 2015
- School district: Loudoun County Public Schools
- Principal: Douglas A. Anderson
- Grades: 9–12
- Enrollment: 1,749 Students (2023-2024)
- Language: English
- Campus: Suburban
- Colors: Royal blue, red, and silver
- Slogan: Roll 'Side
- Mascot: Rams
- Rivals: Broad Run High School; Stone Bridge High School
- Communities served: Lansdowne; University Center; Belmont Country Club; One Loudoun; Ashbrook Commons; Potomac Farms; Kincora
- Feeder schools: Seldens Landing Elementary, Newton-Lee Elementary, Steuart W. Weller Elementary, Sterling Elementary, Belmont Ridge Middle School
- Rival Schools: Independence High School; Heritage High School; Freedom High School; Woodgrove High School; Loudoun County High School
- Athletic Conference: Dulles District; East Region
- Website: https://www.lcps.org/o/rvh

Riverside High School is a public secondary school in the Leesburg subdivision Lansdowne, Virginia, a community in Loudoun County, Virginia. The school is part of Loudoun County Public Schools.

== History ==
Riverside High School, located in Loudoun County, Virginia, opened in 2015, with its student body being fed from Belmont Ridge Middle School, Stone Bridge High School, Broad Run High School, and Tuscarora High School. The school's capacity is 1,800 students.

== Band ==
The Riverside Marching Rams won the Group 1A Virginia State Championship in 2017, at the USBands Virginia State Championship. The Riverside Marching Rams won the Group 2A Virginia State Championship and placed second overall in 2018. The Riverside Marching Rams are directed by William Bramwell Smith IV and instructed by other teachers at Riverside High School, Belmont Ridge Middle School, and several other schools in and around Loudoun county.

Shows
Year	Show Title	Rating
2015	Rise of the Ram	Excellent
2016	Arabian Dreams	Excellent
2017	Portraits of Jazz	Excellent
2018	Adventure Awaits	Superior
2019	The Grid	-
2020	Age of Heroes	-
2021	A Million Dreams	-
2022	Separate Ways	-
2023	One Small Step	-
2024	A Heroes Journey	-
2025	Checkmate	-
2026	Insomnia	-
