= Jalen Coker =

American football player (born 2001)

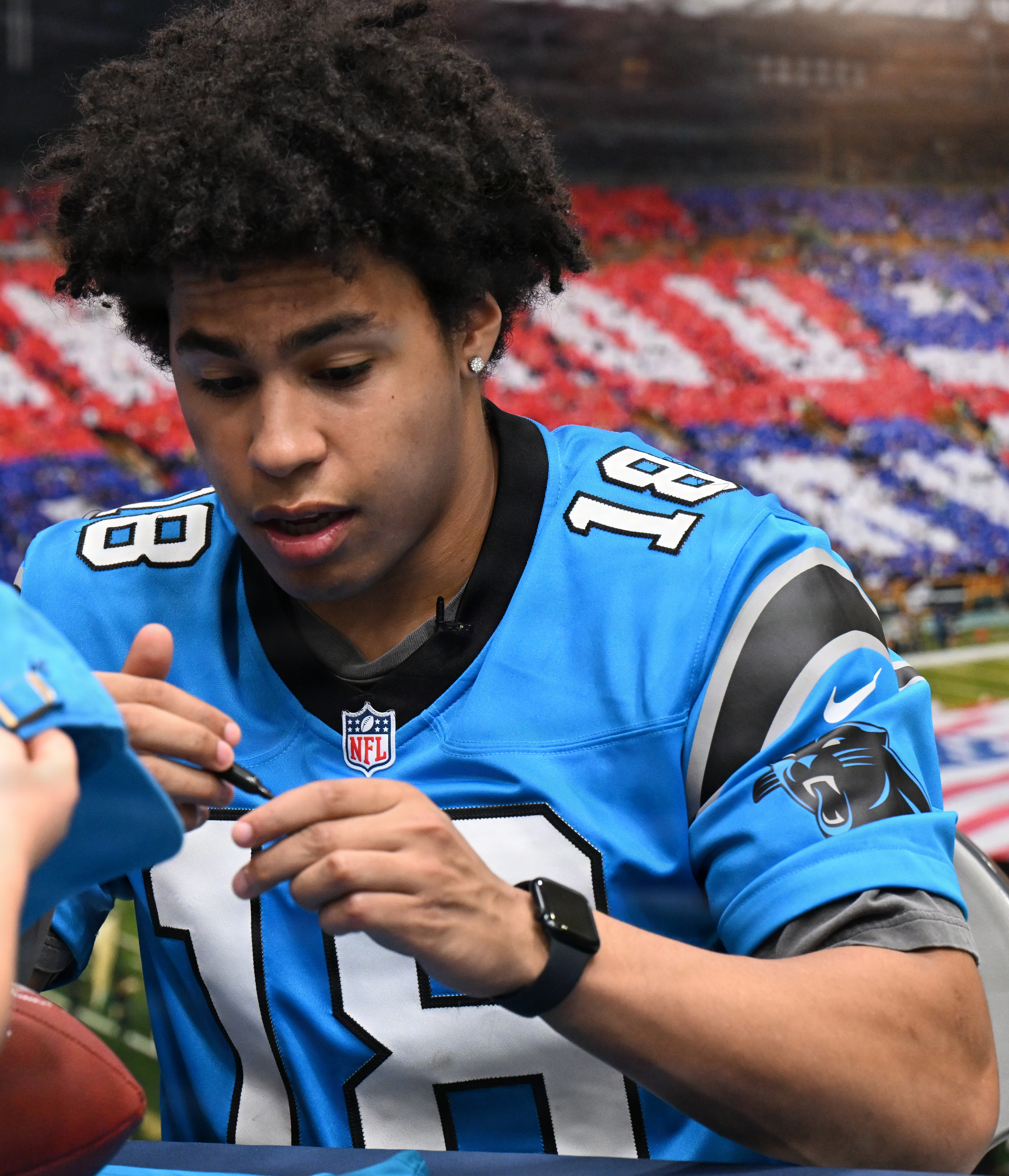
- Coker in 2026

No. 18 – Carolina Panthers
- Position: Wide receiver
- Roster status: Active

Personal information
- Born: October 30, 2001 (age 25); Sterling, Virginia, U.S.
- Listed height: 6 ft 3 in (1.91 m)
- Listed weight: 215 lb (98 kg)

Career information
- High school: Potomac Falls (Sterling)
- College: Holy Cross (2020–2023)
- NFL draft: 2024: undrafted

Career history
- Carolina Panthers (2024–present)

Awards and highlights
- First-team FCS All-American (2023); 2x First-team All-Patriot League (2022, 2023); Second-team All-Patriot League (2021)

Career NFL statistics as of Week 8, 2026
- Receptions: 92
- Receiving yards: 1236
- Receiving touchdowns: 8
- Stats at Pro Football Reference

Jalen Coker (born October 30, 2001) is an American professional football wide receiver for the Carolina Panthers of the National Football League (NFL). He played college football for the Holy Cross Crusaders.

== Early life ==
Coker attended Potomac Falls High School in Sterling, Virginia. During his high school football career, he had 89 receptions for 1,622 yards and 18 touchdowns on offense and 169 tackles and 12 interceptions on defense.

Coker also played on the Potomac Falls basketball team as a center, averaging 16.4 points and 7 rebounds per game. He also recorded 2.3 steals and 2.3 assists per game. Coker's career high was 23 points, which he scored 3 times, against Rock Ridge, Briar Woods, and Albemarle.

Coker played at the College of the Holy Cross from 2020 to 2023. During his career, he had 163 receptions for 2,684 yards and a school record 31 touchdowns. After the 2023 season he entered the 2024 NFL draft.

== Professional career ==
Coker participated in the 2024 NFL Combine.

Pre-draft measurables
Height	Weight	Arm length	Hand span	Wingspan	40-yard dash	10-yard split	20-yard split	Vertical jump	Broad jump	Bench press
6 ft 1 3/8 in (1.86 m)	208 lb (94 kg)	32 7/8 in (0.84 m)	9 7/8 in (0.25 m)	6 ft 4 3/4 in (1.95 m)	4.57 s	1.52 s	2.67 s	42.5 in (1.08 m)	10 ft 8 in (3.25 m)	12 reps
All values from NFL Combine/Pro Day

=== 2024 ===
Coker signed with the Carolina Panthers as an undrafted free agent on May 10, 2024. Coker was waived on August 28, and subsequently re-signed to the practice squad. He was promoted to the active roster on September 24. In Week 15 against the Dallas Cowboys, Coker had four receptions for 110 yards and a touchdown, one of which was an 83-yard reception. As a rookie, he appeared in 11 games, finishing with 32 receptions for 478 yards and two touchdowns.

=== 2025 ===
Coker was placed on injured reserve to begin the 2025 season, the result of a quad strain suffered in practice. He was activated on October 18, 2025, ahead of the team's Week 7 game against the New York Jets. He finished the season second on the team in receiving yards with 33 catches for 394 yards and three touchdowns in 11 games. Coker had a strong performance in his playoff debut, catching 9 passes for 134 yards and a touchdown in the Panthers’ Wild Card loss to the Los Angeles Rams, leading all receivers in the game.

=== 2026 ===
On June 12, 2026, Coker signed a three-year, $35 million contract extension with the Panthers. In Carolina's season–opening loss to the Chicago Bears, Coker recorded eight catches for 138 yards and two touchdowns.
