= River Creek, Virginia =

Unincorporated community in Virginia, United States

Coordinates: 39°6′24″N 77°29′39″W

River Creek is a planned community in Loudoun County, Virginia, United States, located 40 miles (64 km) west of Washington, D.C. and 4 miles (6 km) east of Leesburg at the confluence of the Potomac River and Goose Creek. It was the first gated country club community in the Washington, D.C. metropolitan area. River Creek is a joint venture project of the Tower Companies, Montgomery Development, and ClubCorp USA, Inc. River Creek welcomed its first residents in 1997.

== History ==
River Creek was once the site of numerous sprawling plantation estates on the Potomac River beginning in the 14th century and lasting until the 1960s. The area was originally known as Edward's Ferry, and because of its location on the Potomac River, it has played a vital role throughout American history. In August 1814, during the War of 1812 when the United States government was temporarily moved to Leesburg, patrols of American soldiers and Virginia Militia kept guard against the threat of further British advance up the Potomac Valley. In and around the current River Creek property during the American Civil War, the Battle of Ball's Bluff occurred on October 21, 1861. The golf course is located on top of where Union troops came ashore and skirmished with Confederate troops in the Edward's Ferry portion of the battle. Artifacts from River Creek's over two hundred years of history are on display at its Community Information Center.

== Schools ==
Elementary school children (Kindergarten through 5th Grade) attend Frances Hazel Reid Elementary School located directly north of downtown Leesburg. Middle school students (6th through 8th grade) attend Harper Park Middle School in Leesburg, in Potomac Station. High school students (9th through 12th grade) attend Heritage High School which is located in the southern outskirts of Leesburg.
