= Potomac High School =

Potomac High School is the name of several schools in the United States.

- Potomac High School (Maryland), Oxon Hill, Maryland
- Potomac High School (Virginia), Dumfries, Virginia
- Potomac Falls High School, Sterling, Virginia
- West Potomac High School, Fairfax County, Virginia
- Original name of Winston Churchill High School (Maryland), Potomac, Maryland

== See also ==
- Potomac School (disambiguation)
