= Bill Moravek =

American soccer coach and former player

William H. Moravek
Personal information
- Full name: William H. Moravek

College career
Years	Team	Apps	(Gls)
1987–1988	Clemson Tigers		

Managerial career
- 1999: Maryland Mania
- 2000: British Virgin Islands
- 2000–2001: Seba United
- 2001–2003: Southampton FC Academy
- 2003: Jamaica (assistant)
- 2004–2006: Notre Dame Academy
- 2007–2008: Longwood University (assistant)
- 2008–2011: Bethesda Soccer Club

William H. Moravek is a former soccer player and coach. He is currently a scout for English side Fulham having previously coached the British Virgin Islands national team.

== Biography ==
Moravek grew up on a farm near Oatlands Plantation. As a child he played soccer in Annandale and Reston and traveled to Washington, D.C. to watch matches. He also played for Loudoun County High School and later as a reserve for Clemson University.

He became assistant coach at Howard University in 1994, where he remained until 1997. In 1999, he briefly worked as an assistant at Maryland Mania, a short-lived club in the A-League, the second tier of American soccer.

In April 2000 he was appointed manager of Seba United and the British Virgin Islands national team, becoming the first American to manage another country's national team. He resigned from the Seba job in March 2001 due to financial problems at the club.

In 2001, he joined Southampton in England as a coach for their academy team, before becoming a scout for the club and assistant manager of the Jamaica national team in 2003.

In 2004, he became head coach of the women's team at Notre Dame Academy.
