= Potomac School =

Potomac School may refer to:

- Potomac School (Potomac, Montana), listed on the NRHP in Montana
- Potomac School (McLean, Virginia)

== See also ==
- Potomac High School (disambiguation)
