= Ellen Urbani =

American author

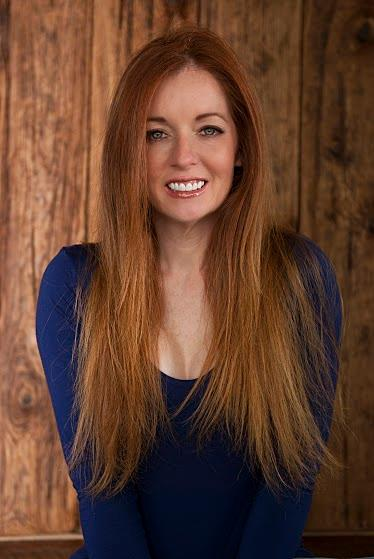
- Ellen Urbani in 2015
- Born: Ellen Urbani; March 21, 1969 (age 57); Philadelphia, Pennsylvania
- Citizenship: United States and Italy/EU
- Occupation: Writer
- Writing career
- Language: English and Spanish
- Subjects: Memoir, fiction, personal essays
- Notable work: When I Was Elena Landfall

Ellen Urbani (born March 21, 1969) is an American author residing near Portland, Oregon. She has written two books: When I Was Elena (The Permanent Press, 2006) and Landfall (Forest Avenue Press, 2015).

== Early life ==
Urbani was born in Philadelphia, Pennsylvania, the eldest of three daughters to Kathryn "Katie" (née White) and Gayton Paul Urbani Jr., a second-generation Italian immigrant. The family moved to Leesburg, Virginia when Urbani was eleven. In 1987 she graduated from Loudoun County High School where she was a cheerleader, served on the editorial staff of the yearbook, and was a member of the National Honor Society.

Urbani earned a BA from The University of Alabama (1991) in Tuscaloosa, where she was a member of Kappa Alpha Theta and commitment worked as an award-winning writer and editor for the Corolla. After graduating from college, she joined the Peace Corps and spent two years (1991–1993) in Guatemala serving as a volunteer in youth development programs. Upon her return to the United States, she earned an MA from Marylhurst University (1996) where she was both an All-American Scholar and a Leopold Schepp Foundation Scholar].

== Counseling career ==
From 1994 to 2007 Urbani worked in the field of oncology counseling, designing and implementing a therapeutic arts programs for cancer patients and their families at hospitals such as Legacy Health System and Oregon Health Sciences University. She also served as an advisory board member at the Annenberg Center for Health Sciences at Eisenhower Medical Center in Rancho Mirage, California; served as executive director and president of the board of directors for the Society for the Arts in Healthcare; taught/lectured as part of the nationally touring faculty for the American Art Therapy Association’s Medical Art Therapy Symposium; and worked as a Mental Health Specialist for the Oregon Disaster Medical Team. Her work is the subject of a short documentary titled Paint Me a Future that won the Juror's Award for Excellence at the Palm Springs International Film Festival in 2000.

== Writing career ==
Urbani's first book, the memoir When I Was Elena (The Permanent Press, 2006) documents the years she lived in Guatemala during that country's civil war. It describes her personal experiences with assaults and illness, as well as political maneuverings such as the self-coup or autogolpe staged by then-President Jorge Serrano Elías who was quickly ousted with help from the CIA. Shortly after publication, the syndicated talk show, The Montel Williams Show, inquired as to whether Urbani would be willing to return to Guatemala to reunite on-camera with the women about whom she wrote. Urbani declined to do so, citing concerns for the safety of the individual women and their families if their true identities were revealed.

Urbani's debut novel, Landfall (Forest Avenue Press, 2015), is a work of historical fiction set in the Deep South – primarily Tuscaloosa, Alabama and New Orleans, Louisiana – in the immediate aftermath of Hurricane Katrina.

In addition to authoring books, Urbani has reviewed books for The Oregonian, written for The New York Times, and has been published in a number of bestselling pop-culture anthologies. Her stories have also been selected for inclusion in a number of other collections and books about Peace Corps service.

== Personal life ==
Urbani married Frank Hiltebrand on May 28, 1994. They met while serving overlapping tours as Peace Corps Volunteers in Guatemala and were married for twelve years. They have two children together. Much of Urbani's work from that time is published under the name Ellen Urbani Hiltebrand or Ellen Hiltebrand.

In 2010, Urbani married Stephen (Steve) Gass, PhD, President and inventor of SawStop. Together they own and operate an equine hay farm, Folly Farms. Urbani has two stepchildren from this marriage.
