= Anthony Donkoh =

American football player

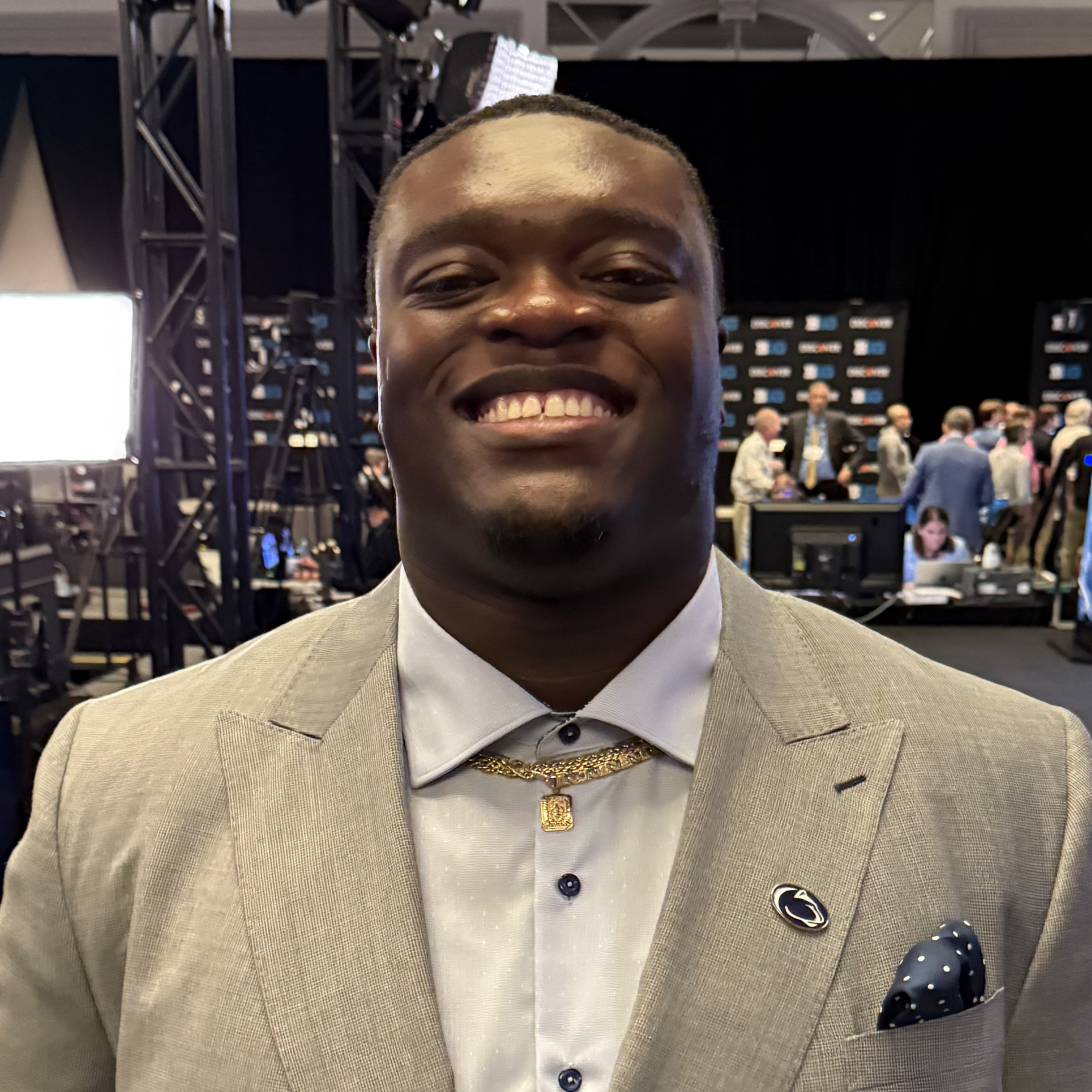
- Donkoh at 2026 Big Ten Media Day

No. 68 – Penn State Nittany Lions
- Position: Offensive tackle
- Class: Redshirt Junior

Personal information
- Listed height: 6 ft 5 in (1.96 m)
- Listed weight: 334 lb (151 kg)

Career information
- High school: Lightridge (Aldie, Virginia)
- College: Penn State (2023–present)
- Stats at ESPN

Anthony K. Donkoh is an American football offensive tackle for the Penn State Nittany Lions.

== Early life ==
Donkoh attended John Champe High School in Aldie, Virginia before transferring to Lightridge High School during his sophomore year. He was rated as a three-star recruit and the 36th overall offensive tackle by On3.com, and committed to play college football for the Penn State Nittany Lions.

== College career ==
As a freshman in 2023, Donkoh played four games and was redshirted. He entered the 2024 season as the Nittany Lions starting right tackle. In week 13 of the 2024 season, Donkoh suffered a season-ending knee injury in a win against Minnesota. He made ten starts at right tackle on the season. In 2025, Donkoh appeared in 13 games with 11 starts at right guard.
