= Loudoun County Public Schools =

Public school division serving Loudoun County, Virginia, United States

Address
- 21000 Education Court Ashburn, Loudoun, Virginia, 20148; United States
- Coordinates: 39°02′01″N 77°31′02″W

District information
- Type: Public
- Grades: Pre-K through 12
- Established: April 2, 1870; 156 years ago
- Superintendent: Aaron C. Spence
- School board: 9 members
- Chair of the board: April Chandler (Algonkian District)
- Governing agency: Virginia Department of Education
- Schools: 100
- Budget: $1.9 billion (FY 2026)
- NCES District ID: 5102250

Students and staff
- Students: 81,486 (2024–25)
- Teachers: 6,719 (2024–25)
- Staff: 6,736 (2024–25)
- Student–teacher ratio: 12.1:1 (2024–25)

Other information
- Website: www.lcps.org

Loudoun County Public Schools (LCPS) is a branch of the Loudoun County, Virginia, United States government, and administers public schools in the county. Its headquarters are located at 21000 Education Court in Ashburn, an unincorporated section of the county.

LCPS operates 100 schools and serves approximately 80,000 students, making it the third-largest school division in Virginia.

== History ==
=== Establishment ===
The public school system in Loudoun County was established in 1870 following a mandate by the Virginia General Assembly to provide public education for all children in the state. Prior to this, education in Loudoun County was primarily conducted through private means or informal community efforts.

=== Desegregation ===
LCPS was one of the last school districts in the nation to begin desegregation in 1967, more than a decade after the Supreme Court's decision in Brown v. Board of Education. In 2020, the school board, the administration, and the county board issued a public apology for its "blatant disregard and disrespect of Black people".

=== Expansion ===
For most of its history, LCPS served a rural population, until developments like the opening of Washington Dulles International Airport in 1962 brought about suburbanization and significant demographic changes to Loudoun County.

Between 2000 and 2020, LCPS opened 51 new schools, including 28 elementary schools, 11 middle schools, 11 high schools, and one educational center.

=== 2021 sexual assaults ===
==== Sexual assaults and charges ====
On May 28, 2021, a male teenager was accused of sexually assaulting a female student in a girls' restroom at Stone Bridge High School in Ashburn. The two had agreed to meet in the restroom, where they had previously engaged in consensual sexual encounters. School officials immediately reported the assault to law enforcement. Following a weeks-long investigation by the Loudoun County Sheriff's Office, a 14-year-old male was arrested on July 8, 2021, and charged with two counts of forcible sodomy. The suspect spent time in a juvenile detention facility before being released and placed on electronic monitoring. He was transferred to Broad Run High School in Ashburn.

On October 6, 2021, the same male teenager, aged 15 at the time, was accused of sexually assaulting a female student in an empty classroom at Broad Run High School. The male student was arrested the following day and charged with sexual battery and abduction of a fellow student. He was again held in a juvenile detention facility.

On October 25, 2021, the suspect was found guilty on all charges for the May 28 assault. On November 15, 2021, the suspect pleaded no contest to a felony charge of abduction and a misdemeanor count of sexual battery for the October 6 assault. He was set to be sentenced on December 13, 2021, but sentencing was delayed until January 2022 in order for the court to perform a psychology evaluation on him and explore residential treatment facility options. In January 2022, the suspect was found guilty on all four charges and was sentenced to complete a "residential program in a locked-down facility" and placed on supervised probation until he turned 18, and ordered to register as a sex offender in Virginia. Loudoun County Juvenile Judge Court Judge Pamela L. Brooks said she had never previously ordered a minor to register as a sex offender, stating, "You scare me. What I read in those reports scared me and should scare families and scare society. You need a lot of help." The perpetrator apologized to the two victims in court. Judge Brooks said that there was a third victim who had not come forward to press charges. Later that month, Brooks decided against placing the perpetrator on the sex offender registry, due to the offender's young age and data indicating that teenagers placed on the registry go on to have higher recidivism rates.

In October 2023, one of the victims filed a lawsuit against the school district for $30 million, alleging that school officials failed to heed warning signs about her attacker and attempted to cover up her sexual assault.

==== Policy 8040 and responses ====
Policy 8040, which was passed in August 2021, a few months after the first assault occurred, allows students to use locker rooms and bathrooms corresponding to their "consistently asserted gender identity"; the policy was adopted to comply with a state mandate. The parents of the Stone Bridge victim have said the perpetrator of their daughter's assault identified as gender fluid. While discussing a draft of Policy 8040 at a school board meeting on June 22, 2021, superintendent Scott Ziegler stated that, to his knowledge, there were no reports of any assaults occurring in the school system's restrooms and that a "predator transgender student or person simply does not exist". The father of the Stone Bridge victim stated he was angered by Ziegler's comments due to his daughter's assault, and was arrested at the meeting after getting into an argument with a fellow attendee; he was found guilty of disorderly conduct and resisting arrest on August 17, 2021. The parents of the Stone Bridge victim accused the school system of covering up the assault to push Policy 8040. The Loudoun County Sheriff's Office stated they were immediately made aware by school officials of the assault on May 28. Authorities have not commented on the parents' "gender fluid" characterization of the perpetrator, but have said he was wearing a skirt at the time of the assault. On October 15, 2021, Ziegler said he "wrongly interpreted" questions posed to him at that meeting and apologized, calling his comments "misleading". Later that month, the perpetrator's lawyer disputed the characterization of his then-client as gender fluid or transgender.

At a school board meeting on October 12, 2021, parents criticized the handling of the assaults, expressing fear for their children's safety in Loudoun County Public Schools and calling for the school board, and superintendent Ziegler, to resign. During an October 15, 2021 press conference, Ziegler acknowledged that the school system had "failed to provide the safe, welcoming, and affirming environment" they aspired to. He went on to state that federal policy contained in Title IX had required a full investigation of the assaults before certain disciplinary actions were allowed to be taken and that he would lobby for changes to this part of Title IX. He also proposed local policy changes that he said would "place greater emphasis on victim rights". These local changes, Ziegler said, would ensure the future separation of "alleged offenders from the general student body" and allow disciplinary actions to begin before the end of any future investigations of assault.

A September 29, 2021 letter from the National School Boards Association (NSBA) to President Joe Biden characterized parents from various school board meetings as "domestic terrorists", including the father of the Stone Bridge victim, citing his arrest at the June 22 meeting. In October 2021, the father demanded an apology and retraction from the NSBA. His attorneys said that the NSBA released an apology to other NSBA members on October 22 but "did not include any specific apology" to him or other parents.

School students across Loudoun County, including students at Stone Bridge High School and Broad Run High School, performed walkout protests on October 26, 2021, in support of the victims.

During his successful campaign for governor of Virginia, Glenn Youngkin responded to the assaults by arguing for an increased police presence in the state's schools. On his first day in office, January 15, 2022, Youngkin signed an executive order requesting that the Virginia Attorney General, Jason Miyares, conduct an investigation into the school system's handling of the assaults.

The assaults coincided with vocal opposition among some parents towards the Loudoun County school system's COVID-19 prevention strategies and racial equity programs. Amid these controversies, several members of the Loudoun County School Board were harassed and received death threats. The New York Times noted that conservative media coverage of the assaults "zeroed in on the transgender angle", and Youngkin's Democratic opponent, Terry McAuliffe, argued that conservatives were exploiting the issue as a "transphobic dog whistle". The New York Times further noted that early media coverage of the assaults failed to report that the victim and assailant "had an ongoing sexual relationship" before the assault occurred "and had arranged to meet in the bathroom."

On March 8, 2022, the Loudoun County School Board voted to adopt an overhaul of the school's Title IX policies that had been in development since the beginning of 2020. Under the reformed policy, a Title IX coordinator is charged with ensuring an immediate investigation and response to instances of "sex discrimination, sexual harassment, or sexual misconduct". The reformed policy also states, "If appropriate and regardless of whether a criminal or regulatory investigation regarding the alleged conduct is pending, the school division shall promptly take interim action to maintain a safe and secure learning environment for all students."

==== Dismissal and criminal conviction of Superintendent Ziegler ====
On December 6, 2022, Superintendent of LCPS Scott Ziegler was fired with immediate effect by a unanimous vote after a closed session school board meeting. He was fired due to the school district's response to the 2021 sexual assault cases. Specifically, a grand jury report had concluded that Ziegler was informed about the assault on the day that it happened but he later lied about his knowledge of the event during a school board meeting the following month. Glenn Youngkin reacted on December 7, 2022, by tweeting "The special grand jury’s report on the horrific sexual assaults in Loudoun has exposed wrongdoing, prompted disciplinary actions, & provided families with the truth. I will continue to empower parents & push for accountability on behalf of our students." Ziegler's removal was faced with positive statements from people in Loudoun County. According to a source, because he was dismissed "without cause", Ziegler will continue to receive full benefits and his $323,000 annual salary for the next year. Three criminal charges against Zeigler were made public days later, on December 12, following a judicial order to unseal the grand jury indictments against him and a district employee.

On 29 September 2023, a jury found Ziegler guilty of retaliating against a teacher in a separate case. The teacher had reported repeated sexual assaults from a student and that Ziegler had retaliated after she went public about her treatment and lack of a response from school administrators. In March, 2024, Judge Joseph Fleming, citing a legal error, set aside the guilty verdict. A move which Courthouse News Service called a "victory" for Ziegler.

=== Fentanyl overdoses ===
In September and October 2023, 19 students at Loudoun schools overdosed on fentanyl. At least four of the overdoses took place on school property at Park View High School, with medical personnel administering Narcan in three cases and CPR twice. LCPS officials delayed informing other parents in the school community of the overdoses for almost three weeks, prompting Virginia governor Glenn Youngkin to issue an executive order mandating public schools notify all parents within a school division of a school-related overdose occurring within 24 hours.

=== Personal technology policy ===
LCPS Policy 8655 is a policy created by the Loudoun County School Board restricting student personal technology usage. This policy, in its original form, was passed on June 25, 2024. Following Virginia's passage of Virginia Code § 22.1-79.3:1 in April 2025, which restricts student use of personal technology in all grades during the school day, the School Board passed an updated and more restrictive version of Policy 8655 on December 16, 2025. The updated version of this policy was implemented in all Loudoun County Public Schools on January 5, 2026. LCPS has accepted feedback throughout the policy's implementation, and some members of the School Board are considering further changes.

Under the updated December 2025 version of LCPS Policy 8655, all students are not permitted to use personal devices from bell-to-bell, unless they have a documented Individualized Education Program (IEP), Section 504 Plan, individualized healthcare plan, or Limited English Proficiency Plan. As a result, most students are limited to only LCPS-provided technology during the school day while on school property.

==== Original policy ====
The previous (original) version of LCPS Policy 8655 was comparatively less restrictive for high school students. While high school students had to keep their personal devices in a designated classroom storage location during classes, they were allowed to use their devices in between class periods and during lunch with staff permission.

School board member Anne Donohue made a last-minute amendment to the original policy, removing the option for phones to be stowed away in backpacks as long as they were on silent mode as an alternative to them being in a designated classroom storage location.

==== Updated policy ====
Following Virginia Governor Glenn Youngkin passing Virginia Code § 22.1-79.3:1 in April 2025, which made personal device usage at all grade levels illegal from bell-to-bell, the LCPS school board began updating their own policy to reflect the state law. There was extensive discussion among the School Board about their update to the policy. Some expressed it was too restrictive, though full conformance with state law was required. On December 16, 2025, the School Board voted 6-1 to approve the updated provisions to the policy, with two abstentions, and the policy took effect on January 5, 2026.

=== Title IX ===
Loudoun County Public Schools has been heavily criticized by parents, and the Attorney General of Virginia, Jason Miyares, for "weaponizing" their Title IX policy.

Around October 2024, Loudoun County Public Schools opened a Title IX investigation against three boys, who attended Stone Bridge High School, for voicing concerns to each other about a female student using the boy's locker room. One of the students, who was Christian, told his PE teacher, Hunter Manspile, about his objection to sharing a locker room with a female student, and was told not to mention anything about the situation. On May 6, 2025, the Attorney General of Virginia, Jason Miyares, launched an investigation into Loudoun County Public Schools for retaliation against the three boys. Loudoun County Public Schools was found "weaponizing" their Title IX policy during Attorney General Miyares' investigation into LCPS.

== Administration ==
The LCPS system, while operated on a day-to-day basis by the Superintendent (Dr. Aaron C. Spence), is managed under the direction and authority of the Loudoun County School Board, a nine-member panel elected by citizens in the county. Eight of the nine board positions are divided among voting districts that represent communities throughout the county, while the ninth seat is elected at-large by the entire county. The voting districts correspond to those used for Loudoun County Board of Supervisors elections. Unlike the Board of Supervisors, the chairmanship of the School Board is elected annually by its members, while the Chairman of the Board of Supervisors is always the at-large seat. While the School Board makes decisions relating to school policy and curriculum, it receives funding through the Board of Supervisors.

=== School Board ===
Loudoun County School Board (January 1, 2026, to December 31, 2027) (Elected on November 7, 2023, and November 4, 2025)
Position	Name	Party	First Elected	District
Chair	April Chandler	Nonpartisan	2023	Algonkian
Vice Chair	Anne Donohue	Nonpartisan	2023	At-Large
Member	Deana Griffiths	Nonpartisan	2023	Ashburn
Member	Ross Svenson	Nonpartisan	2025	Broad Run
Member	Kari LaBell	Nonpartisan	2023	Catoctin
Member	Jon Pepper	Nonpartisan	2025	Dulles
Member	Lauren Shernoff	Nonpartisan	2023	Leesburg
Member	Sumera Rashid	Nonpartisan	2023	Little River
Member	Amy Riccardi	Nonpartisan	2025	Sterling

=== School Board Members History ===
Extended content

School Board Members (1996-present)
	At-Large	Algonkian (Sugarland Run 1996 to 2011)	Ashburn (Mercer 1996 to 2003) (Potomac 2004 to 2011)	Broad Run	Catoctin	Dulles	Leesburg	Little River (Blue Ridge 1996 to 2023)	Sterling
1996-1999	Wendell T. Fisher	Candyce Prichard Cassell	Edward John Kiley	Ellen D. Oliver (Resigned 1999)	Harry J. Brown	Joseph William Vogric	Jeffrey Michael Maged	Harry Frank Holsinger	Deborah Kim Price-Munoz
1996-1999	Wendell T. Fisher	Candyce Prichard Cassell	Edward John Kiley	Susan N. Hembach (Appointed 1999)	Harry J. Brown	Joseph William Vogric	Jeffrey Michael Maged	Harry Frank Holsinger	Deborah Kim Price-Munoz
2000-2003	Thomas Edward Reed	Candyce Prichard Cassell	Patrick F. Chorpenning Jr. (Resigned 2002)	John Albert Andrews II	Geary Michael Higgins	Joseph William Vogric	Frederick Felix Flemming	Harry Frank Holsinger	James Warren Geurin
2000-2003	Thomas Edward Reed	Candyce Prichard Cassell	Robert Floyd Dupree Jr. (Appointed 2003)	John Albert Andrews II	Geary Michael Higgins	Joseph William Vogric	Frederick Felix Flemming	Harry Frank Holsinger	James Warren Geurin
2004-2007	Thomas Edward Reed	Joseph M. Guzman	John Albert Andrews II (Resigned 2007)	Robert Joseph Ohneiser	Mark Joseph Nuzzaco	Robert Floyd Dupree Jr.	Sarah B. Smith	Priscilla Bentley Godfrey	James Warren Geurin
2004-2007	Thomas Edward Reed	Joseph M. Guzman	John B. Stevens Jr. (Appointed 2007)	Robert Joseph Ohneiser	Mark Joseph Nuzzaco	Robert Floyd Dupree Jr.	Sarah B. Smith	Priscilla Bentley Godfrey	James Warren Geurin
2008-2011	Thomas Edward Reed	Joseph M. Guzman	John B. Stevens Jr.	Robert Joseph Ohneiser	Jennifer Keller Bergel	Robert Floyd Dupree Jr.	Thomas Corbett Marshall	Priscilla Bentley Godfrey	James Warren Geurin (Died 2011)
2008-2011	Thomas Edward Reed	Joseph M. Guzman	John B. Stevens Jr.	Robert Joseph Ohneiser	Jennifer Keller Bergel	Robert Floyd Dupree Jr.	Thomas Corbett Marshall	Priscilla Bentley Godfrey	Brenda L. Sheridan (Appointed 2011)
2012-2015	Thomas Edward Reed	Debra Kay Rose	Eric David Hornberger	Kevin John Kuesters	Jennifer Keller Bergel	Jeffrey Edward Morse	William Dale Fox	Jill Annette Turgeon	Brenda L. Sheridan
2016-2019	Elizabeth Ann Huck	Debra Kay Rose	Eric David Hornberger	Joy-Ann Rose Maloney	Eric Joseph DeKenipp (Resigned 2018)	Jeffrey Edward Morse	Thomas Corbett Marshall	Jill Annette Turgeon	Brenda L. Sheridan
2016-2019	Elizabeth Ann Huck	Debra Kay Rose	Eric David Hornberger	Joy-Ann Rose Maloney	Christina M. Croll (Appointed 2018)	Jeffrey Edward Morse	Thomas Corbett Marshall	Jill Annette Turgeon	Brenda L. Sheridan
2020-2023	Denise Renee Corbo	Atoosa Reza Reaser	Harris Mahedavi	Leslee Maureen King (Died 2021)	John Patrick Beatty	Jeffrey Edward Morse	Elizabeth Rae Barts (Resigned 2021)	Ian Jeffrey Serotkin	Brenda L. Sheridan
2020-2023	Denise Renee Corbo	Atoosa Reza Reaser	Harris Mahedavi	Andrew Thomas Hoyler (Appointed 2021)	John Patrick Beatty	Jeffrey Edward Morse	Thomas Corbett Marshall (Appointed 2021)	Ian Jeffrey Serotkin	Brenda L. Sheridan
2020-2023	Denise Renee Corbo	Atoosa Reza Reaser	Harris Mahedavi	Tiffany L. Polifko (Elected 2022)	John Patrick Beatty	Jeffrey Edward Morse	Erika R. Ogedegbe (Elected 2022)	Ian Jeffrey Serotkin	Brenda L. Sheridan
2024-2025	Anne Pogue Donohue	April Moore Chandler	Deana L. Griffiths	Dr. Linda Worrell Deans	Karen Lee LaBell	Melinda Marie Mansfield	Lauren E. Shernoff	Dr. Sumera Rashid	Arben Istrefi
2026-2027	Anne Pogue Donohue	April Moore Chandler	Deana L. Griffiths	Ross C. Svenson	Karen Lee LaBell	Jonathon A. Pepper	Lauren E. Shernoff	Dr. Sumera Rashid	Amy M. Riccardi

== Demographics ==
As of the 2023-24 school year Loudoun County Public Schools Demographics are as follows:

- 40.4% White
- 26.0% Asian
- 19.5% Hispanic
- 7.3% Black
- 5.9% Mixed Races
- 0.7% American Indian

== Schools ==
=== High schools ===
High schools in Loudoun County, Virginia
Name	Location	Mascot
Briar Woods High School	Ashburn	Falcons
Broad Run High School	Ashburn	Spartans
Dominion High School	Sterling	Titans
Freedom High School	South Riding	Eagles
Heritage High School	Leesburg	Pride
Independence High School	Ashburn	Tigers
John Champe High School	Aldie	Knights
Lightridge High School	Aldie	Lightning Bolts
Loudoun County High School	Leesburg	Captains
Loudoun Valley High School	Purcellville	Vikings
Park View High School	Sterling	Patriots
Potomac Falls High School	Sterling	Panthers
Riverside High School	Leesburg	Rams
Rock Ridge High School	Ashburn	Phoenix
Stone Bridge High School	Ashburn	Bulldogs
Thornton Summit High School (opens in 2028)	Leesburg	TBA
Tuscarora High School	Leesburg	Huskies
Woodgrove High School	Purcellville	Wolverines

=== Magnet schools ===
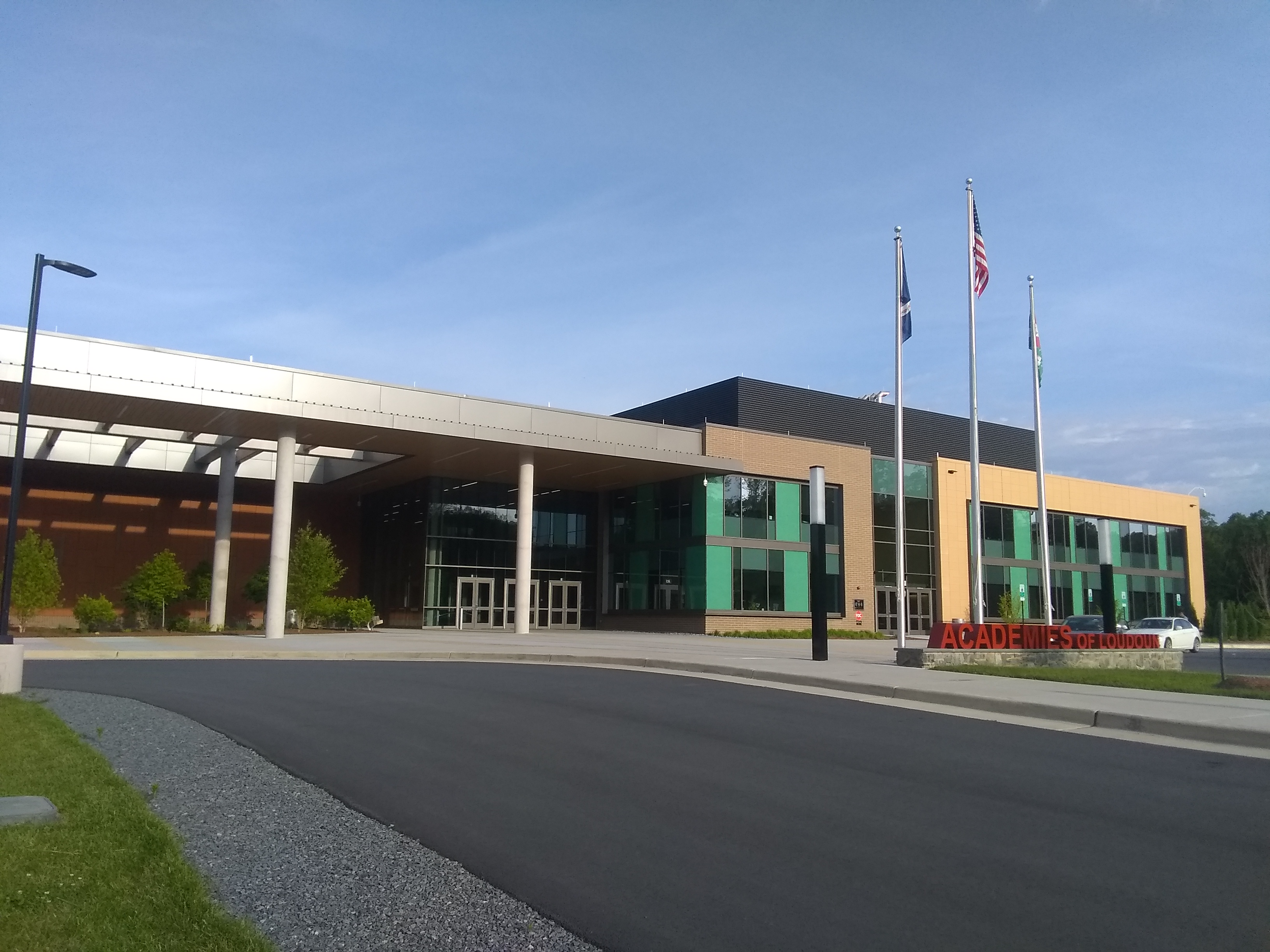
Academies of Loudoun from bus loop

Magnet schools in Loudoun County, Virginia
Name	Location	Mascot	Notes
Academies of Loudoun	Leesburg	Raptors	STEM-focused magnet school that houses three programs: Monroe Advanced Technical Academy (MATA), Academy of Science (AOS), and the Academy of Engineering & Technology (AET).
Thomas Jefferson High School for Science and Technology	Alexandria	Colonials	Public magnet high school in the Fairfax County Public Schools district. LCPS students are eligible to apply to TJHSST.

=== Middle schools ===
Middle schools in Loudoun County, Virginia
Name	Location	Notes
Belmont Ridge Middle School	Leesburg	
Blue Ridge Middle School	Purcellville	
Brambleton Middle School	Ashburn	Grade 8 only, Grades 6 and 7 attend Watson Mountain
Eagle Ridge Middle School	Ashburn	
Farmwell Station Middle School	Ashburn	
Gum Spring Middle School	Aldie	formerly Mercer Middle School
Harmony Middle School	Hamilton	formerly Harmony Intermediate School
Harper Park Middle School	Leesburg	
J. Lupton Simpson Middle School	Leesburg	
J. Michael Lunsford Middle School	Chantilly	
River Bend Middle School	Sterling	
Seneca Ridge Middle School	Sterling	
Smart's Mill Middle School	Leesburg	
Sterling Middle School	Sterling	
Stone Hill Middle School	Ashburn	
Trailside Middle School	Ashburn	
Watson Mountain Middle School	Leesburg	Grades 6 and 7 only, Grade 8 attends Brambleton
Willard Middle School	Aldie	formerly Willard Intermediate School

=== Elementary schools ===
Serves grades K–5.

- Aldie Elementary School, Aldie
- Algonkian Elementary School, Sterling
- Arcola Elementary School, Aldie
- Ashburn Elementary School, Ashburn
- Ball's Bluff Elementary School, Leesburg
- Banneker Elementary School, Saint Louis
- Belmont Station Elementary School, Ashburn
- Buffalo Trail Elementary School, Aldie
- Cardinal Ridge Elementary School, Centreville
- Catoctin Elementary School, Leesburg
- Cedar Lane Elementary School, Ashburn
- Cool Spring Elementary School, Leesburg
- Countryside Elementary School, Sterling
- Creighton's Corner Elementary School, Ashburn
- Discovery Elementary School, Ashburn
- Dominion Trail Elementary School, Ashburn
- Elaine E. Thompson Elementary School, Arcola
- Emerick Elementary School, Purcellville
- Evergreen Mill Elementary School, Leesburg
- Forest Grove Elementary School, Sterling
- Frederick Douglass Elementary School, Leesburg
- Goshen Post Elementary School, Aldie
- Guilford Elementary School, Sterling
- Hamilton Elementary School, Hamilton
- Henrietta Lacks Elementary School (grades PreK-2), Aldie
- Hillsboro Charter Academy (Note: formerly Hillsboro Elementary School), Purcellville
- Hillside Elementary School, Ashburn
- Horizon Elementary School, Sterling
- Hovatter Elementary School (grades 3-5), Aldie
- Hutchison Farm Elementary School, South Riding
- John W. Tolbert Jr. Elementary School, Leesburg
- Kenneth Culbert Elementary School, Hamilton
- Leesburg Elementary School, Leesburg
- Legacy Elementary School, Ashburn
- Liberty Elementary School, South Riding
- Lincoln Elementary School, Purcellville
- Little River Elementary School, South Riding
- Lovettsville Elementary School, Lovettsville
- Lowes Island Elementary School, Sterling
- Lucketts Elementary School, Leesburg
- Madison's Trust Elementary School, Ashburn
- Meadowland Elementary School, Sterling
- Middleburg Community Charter School (Note: formerly Middleburg Elementary School), Middleburg
- Mill Run Elementary School, Ashburn
- Moorefield Station Elementary School, Ashburn
- Mountain View Elementary School, Purcellville
- Newton-Lee Elementary School, Ashburn
- Pinebrook Elementary School, Aldie
- Potowmack Elementary School, Sterling
- Richard and Mildred Loving Elementary School (Note: formerly Frances Hazel Reid Elementary School), Leesburg
- Rolling Ridge Elementary School, Sterling
- Rosa Lee Carter Elementary School, Ashburn
- Round Hill Elementary School, Round Hill
- Sanders Corner Elementary School, Ashburn
- Seldens Landing Elementary School, Lansdowne
- Sterling Elementary School, Sterling
- Steuart W. Weller Elementary School, Ashburn
- Sugarland Elementary School, Sterling
- Sully Elementary School, Sterling
- Sycolin Creek Elementary School, Leesburg
- Waterford Elementary School, Waterford
- Waxpool Elementary School, Ashburn

=== Alternative schools ===
Alternative secondary-level school programs in Loudoun County, Virginia
Name	Location	Notes
The North Star School (formerly Douglass School)	Leesburg	Programs focused on students who may benefit from more extensive individualized academic and social support.
William O. Robey High School	Sterling	Non-traditional high school intended to serve students that are working, parenting, or otherwise need to earn credits more quickly. Co-located with Dominion High School

== Special programs ==
=== Dual Language Immersion (DLI) ===
In 2023, LCPS launched a Dual Language Immersion (DLI) program at Potowmack Elementary School in Sterling and Sanders Corner Elementary School in Ashburn. The program is open to all kindergarten students in the district, and enrollment is determined through a lottery system.

In the program, students spend half of each school day learning math, science, language arts, and computer science in Spanish, and the other half studying social studies and English language arts in English.

As of 2024, the current program is expected to expand through each grade level at the existing schools up to the fifth grade, with each grade being added during each subsequent year through fiscal year 2029.

== See also ==
- List of school divisions in Virginia
