= Woodgrove =

Historic house in Virginia, United States

- U.S. National Register of Historic Places
- Virginia Landmarks Register
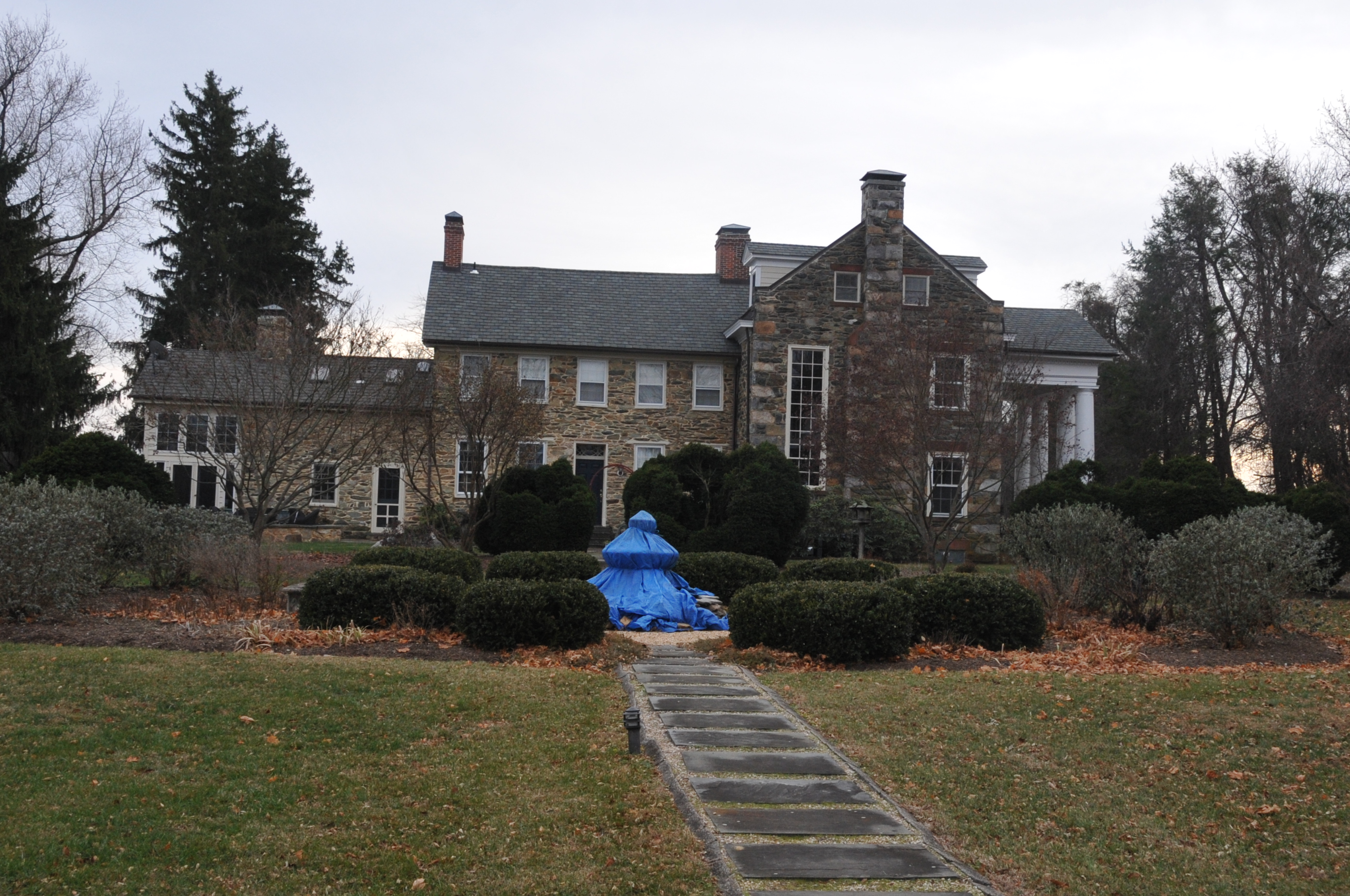

- Location within Northern Virginia Location within Virginia Location within the United States
- Location: 16860 Woodgrove Rd., Round Hill, Virginia
- Coordinates: 39°9′6″N 77°46′10″W
- Area: 9.8 acres (4.0 ha)
- Built: c. 1785, c. 1840, c. 1910
- Architectural style: Federal, Classical Revival
- NRHP reference No.: 02001004
- VLR No.: 053-0423

Significant dates
- Added to NRHP: September 14, 2002
- Designated VLR: June 12, 2002

Woodgrove is a historic home located near Round Hill, Loudoun County, Virginia. The original section of the house was built around 1785, with a rear ell added around 1840, and an addition with a new main entrance in about 1910. All sections are two-and-a-half stories in height and constructed of native fieldstone. The oldest section of the house is in the Federal style and the 1910 addition is in the Classical Revival style. Also on the property is a contributing fieldstone meat house, built around 1840.

It was listed on the National Register of Historic Places in 2002.
