= Independence High School (Ashburn, Virginia) =

Location
- 23115 Learning Circle; Ashburn, Loudoun County, Virginia 20148; 38.9764°N 77.5534°W

Information
- School type: Public High School
- Founded: 2019
- School district: Loudoun County Public Schools
- NCES District ID: 5102250
- Principal: John G. Gabriel
- Teaching staff: 131.64 (FTE)
- Grades: 9–12
- Enrollment: 2,073
- Student to teacher ratio: 13.86
- Language: English
- Campus: Suburban
- Colors: Red, Navy Blue, White
- Mascot: Tigers
- Nickname: Indy
- Rivals: Rock Ridge High School, Riverside High School, Briar Woods High School, Lightridge High School
- Communities served: Brambleton; Evergreen Village; Willowsford; Greene Mill Preserve; West Park; Nicholson Farm
- Feeder schools: Brambleton Middle School; Watson Mountain Middle School; Creighton's Corner Elementary School; Legacy Elementary School; Madison's Trust Elementary School; Sycolin Creek Elementary School; Elaine E. Thompson Elementary School
- Athletic Conference: Dulles District
- Website: www.lcps.org/o/ihs

Independence High School is a public high school in Ashburn, Virginia, and is part of Loudoun County Public Schools. Opening for the first time in 2019, Independence High School serves the communities of Ashburn and Brambleton.

== Administration ==
Independence High School is headed by John G. Gabriel, a 2017 semi-finalist for The Washington Post Principal of the year. Gabriel was previously the principal of John Champe High School, and an assistant principal at Park View High School.

== Athletics ==
The Independence High School mascot is a tiger and its sports teams currently play in the class 6 Cedar Run District. The Independence High School athletic director is Ryan Rogers, who came from the Heritage High School in Leesburg, Virginia to open up the school in 2019. Independence High School offers competitive cheer, cross country, marching band, crew, field hockey, football, golf, gymnastics, indoor and outdoor track, girls' volleyball, basketball, wrestling, swimming, baseball, soccer, softball, and tennis.

=== Recent achievements ===
In 2025, Independence High School's crew team earned a gold medal at the Virginia Scholastic Rowing Champions. The boys varsity lacrosse team advanced to the Virginia High School League State Championships in the Class 5 division.

== Extracurricular activities ==
=== Marching arts ===
==== Marching band ====
The Independence High School Marching Band is under the direction of Kyle Harrington and Amanda Young. The band has won various awards and achievements, including the VMBC Commonwealth Cup in 2023, 2024, and 2025, along with being crowned class 6A state champions in all three of these years. They also placed second at the Bands Of America Mid-Atlantic Regional in 2023 and were the class 3A champions, as well as being placed 15th at the Bands Of America Indianapolis Super Regional during prelims in 2024. In the 2024 competition, the band came within one-tenth of a point of advancing to the national finals at the Bands of America Indianapolis Super Regional Championship.

==== Indoor percussion ensemble ====
For the first time in the school's history, Independence High School participated in an indoor percussion ensemble season in 2025 and combined with Rock Ridge High School and Briar Woods High School to form Rock Ridge Combined Percussion. During the 2025 season, the group was under the direction of Justin Ratcliff and Patrick O'Rourke from Rock Ridge High School, along with having help from additional staff from the other two schools.

=== Science Fair ===
In 2025, Independence sent 3 students to the International Science and Engineering Fair.

== Academic Recognition ==
Independence High School has been recognized for its academic performance among Virginia public schools. The school is ranked #2 in Best Public High Schools in Virginia according to Niche, and ranks #1 among public high schools in Loudoun County (excluding Thomas Jefferson High School for Science and Technology, a specialized magnet school). Additionally, the school ranks 8th among 328 Virginia public high schools according to SchoolDigger.

Academic metrics for the school include a 97% graduation rate, with 96% of students achieving proficiency in reading and 68% in mathematics according to state assessments. The school also offers an extensive Advanced Placement program with a 71% AP enrollment rate. Additionally, Independence High School incorporates Project Lead the Way curriculum to support STEM education.
