= Stone Bridge High School =

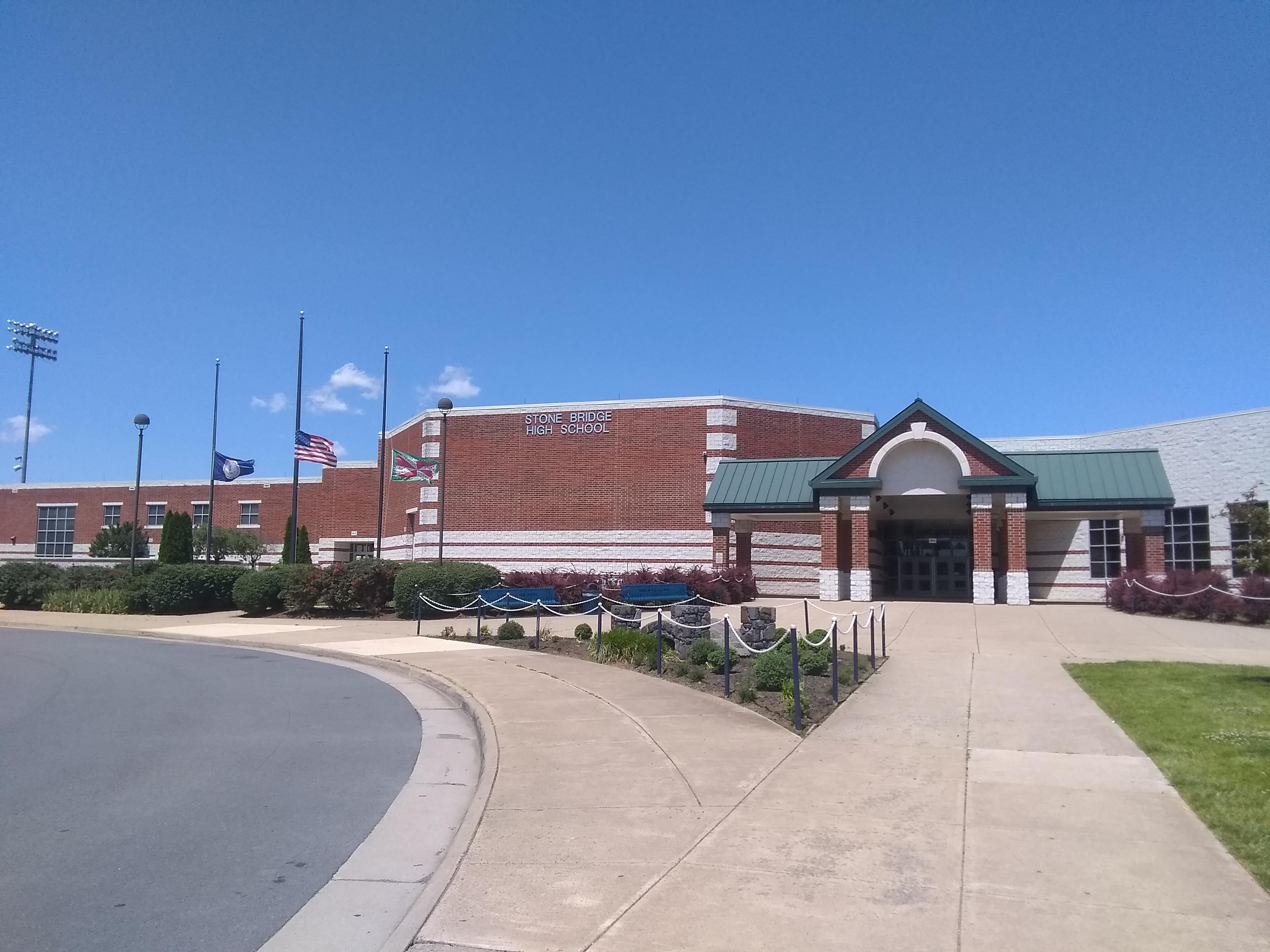

Location
- 43100 Hay Road; Ashburn, Loudoun County, Virginia 20147; 39.0487708°N 77.5109807°W

Information
- School type: Public high school
- Established: 2000
- School district: Loudoun County Public Schools
- Superintendent: Aaron Spence
- Principal: Timothy P. Flynn
- Teaching staff: 131.90 (on an FTE basis)
- Grades: 9–12, 8 for some activities
- Age range: 12-20
- Enrollment: 1,697 (2023–2024)
- Student to teacher ratio: 12.87
- Language: English
- Schedule: 9:30 AM - 4:18 PM
- Campus: Suburban
- Colors: Carolina blue, navy, white, and silver
- Mascot: Bulldog
- Rival: Broad Run
- Communities served: Ashburn Farm; Chase at Belmont Country Club; Ridges at Belmont Country Club; Belmont Greene; Goose Creek Preserve; Goose Creek Village; Old Ashburn; The Ridges at Ashburn
- Feeder schools: Trailside Middle School; Belmont Station Elementary School; Cedar Lane Elementary School; Newton-Lee Elementary School; Sanders Corner Elementary School
- Athletic conference: Potomac District; VHSL Class 5 Region C NVSHL
- Website: https://www.lcps.org/o/sbh

Stone Bridge High School is a public secondary school in Ashburn, a community in Loudoun County, Virginia, United States. It is part of Loudoun County Public Schools.

Newsweek ranked Stone Bridge the #4 high school in Virginia and the #1 high school in Loudoun County in 2014.

== History ==
Stone Bridge opened in 2000. The school derives its name from the stone Broad Run Bridge.

In 2002, most of Stone Bridge's Leesburg student body was moved to Heritage High School, but some additional students from Broad Run were moved to Stone Bridge, dropping enrollment to roughly 1,400 students in the 2002–2003 school year. However, by the 2004–2005 school year, the student body went up to nearly 1,900, the largest student body in Loudoun County.

=== 2021 sexual assault ===
On May 28, 2021, a male teenager was accused of sexually assaulting a female student in a girls' restroom at Stone Bridge High School in Ashburn. Following a weeks-long investigation by the Loudoun County Sheriff's Office, a 14-year-old male was arrested on July 8, 2021, and charged with two counts of forcible sodomy. On October 6, 2021, the same male teenager, now aged 15, was accused of sexually assaulting a female student in an empty classroom at Broad Run High School. The male student was arrested the following day and charged with sexual battery and abduction of a fellow student. On October 25, 2021, the suspect was found guilty on all charges for the May 28 assault. On November 15, 2021, the suspect pleaded no contest to a felony charge of abduction and a misdemeanor count of sexual battery for the October 6 assault. In January 2022, the suspect was found guilty on all four charges and was sentenced to complete a "residential program in a locked-down facility" and placed on supervised probation until he turned 18, and ordered to register as a sex offender in Virginia. Later that month, Brooks decided against placing the perpetrator on the sex offender registry, due to the offender's young age and data indicating that teenagers placed on the registry go on to have higher recidivism rates.

== Extracurricular activities ==
The debate program won the AA state title in 2005, and the AAA state title in 2006.

Stone Bridge's chapter of Future Business Leaders of America (FBLA) has been named as an Honor Chapter by the Virginia FBLA since it was chartered in 2002. In 2006, the chapter was recognized with its first award from the National FBLA organization; receiving the Business Achievement Award.

== Athletics ==
Stone Bridge athletics have secured 18 state championships across various sports, including cheerleading, girls' soccer, ice hockey, and football.

=== Football (Stone Bridge Bulldogs) ===
Stone Bridge High School's football program is among the most dominant in Virginia, being ranked third most dominant in the 2000s and 2010s via Maxpreps, widely respected both regionally and statewide. There have only been two head coaches during the program's history, Mickey Thompson (2000–2023) and Kedric Golston (2024–present).

Key achievements:

- 3x state championships
  - 2007 (AAA Division 5)
  - Spring 2021 (COVID year) VA 5A
  - Fall 2021 VA 5A
- 9x state runner-up
- 16x region champions
- 19x district champions
- Overall record of 269-59

The school's mascot and colors were established in 1999 after a student referendum at Broad Run High School, Loudoun County High School, and Harper Park Middle School.

Stone Bridge has won 18 state titles in the following sports:

- Four for cheerleading (AA champion in 2004; AAA champion in 2005, 2006, and 2008)
- Eight NVSHL titles for ice hockey in 2001–2002, 2002–2003, 2007–2008, 2010–2011, 2011–2012, 2014–2015, 2015–16, and 2016–17
- Two for girls' soccer (AA in 2005 and AAA in 2010)
- Four AAA titles for football (Division 5) in 2007, Spring 2021 (2020 season delayed due to COVID-19 pandemic), Fall 2021, Fall 2023

== Notable alumni ==
- Jonathan Allen, defensive tackle for the Cincinnati Bengals: graduated in 2013
- J.B. Bukauskas, former baseball pitcher for the Arizona Diamondbacks: graduated in 2014
- Adam Comrie (1990–2020), former defensiveman for the Worcester Sharks of the American Hockey League while under contract to the San Jose Sharks of the National Hockey League
- Aaron Crawford, former defensive end for the Baltimore Ravens: graduated in 2015
- Nate Davis, former offensive lineman for the Chicago Bears: graduated in 2014
- Ryan Ellis, racecar driver in NASCAR Xfinity Series: graduated in 2008; attended George Mason University 2009–2012
- Tai Felton, wide receiver for the Minnesota Vikings: graduated in 2021
- Emily Fox, Olympic gold medalist (2024), soccer player for the United States and Arsenal WFC, selected as the first overall pick in the 2021 NWSL Draft: graduated in 2017
- Mikail Kamara, college football defensive end for the James Madison Dukes and the Indiana Hoosiers: graduated in 2020
- Jennifer Skogerboe, soccer player for the University of Connecticut, central midfielder for Washington Spirit: graduated in 2010
- Jacob Thomas, NFL safety for the Minnesota Vikings: graduated in 2022
- Zach Thompson, former NFL defensive end: graduated in 2009
- Ed Wang, former NFL offensive lineman: graduated in 2005
- Billy Wiles, college football quarterback for the Clemson Tigers, the Southern Miss Golden Eagles and the Appalachian State Mountaineers: graduated in 2021
- Jennifer Yu, chess player, Woman Grandmaster, and 2-time U.S. Women's Chess Champion: graduated in 2020
