= Loudoun Valley High School =

Coordinates: 39°8′25.2″N 77°42′7.7″W

Location
- 340 North Maple Avenue; Purcellville, Virginia 20132

Information
- School type: Public high school
- Founded: 1963
- School district: Loudoun County Public Schools
- Principal: Susan Ross
- Teaching staff: 102.70 (on an FTE basis)
- Grades: 9–12
- Enrollment: 1,174 (2023–2024)
- Student to teacher ratio: 11.43
- Language: English
- Campus: Rural
- Colors: Green and Gold
- Mascot: Viking
- Nickname: Valley
- Communities served: Purcellville; Middleburg; Hamilton; Lincoln; Upperville; Philomont
- Feeder schools: Banneker Elementary, Emerick Elementary, Hamilton Elementary, Kenneth Culbert Elementary School, Lincoln Elementary, Middleburg Community Charter, Mountain View Elementary, Blue Ridge Middle School
- Athletic Conference: 4A Conference 21B; 4A West Region
- Website: www.lcps.org/lvhs

Loudoun Valley High School (more commonly known as Valley) is a public secondary school in Purcellville, Virginia, United States. It is part of Loudoun County Public Schools. Before the opening of Woodgrove High School in 2010, it was the sole high school for the western half of Loudoun County (which includes Purcellville, Hamilton, Round Hill, Lovettsville, Hillsboro, Middleburg, Philomont and Bluemont).

== History ==
Loudoun Valley opened in 1962. Throughout its history, Valley has remained a predominantly rural high school, maintained a small enrollment of roughly 800 students, and did not experience much of the sprawl that eastern Loudoun County experienced in the 1980s and 1990s. Until the 1999–2000 school year, Valley was the smallest high school in Loudoun County.

Recently, due to immigration, Valley has begun to experience a high rate of growth similar to eastern Loudoun schools like Park View and Broad Run. In 2002, Harmony Intermediate School opened as a school for eighth and ninth graders, making Valley a 10th–12th grade school. By the 2005–2006 school year, Valley had become the largest Loudoun County high school with 1,955 students. Valley had extreme overcrowding until a new western Loudoun County high school, Woodgrove High School, opened in September 2010.

At this time, Loudoun Valley returned to having 9th–12th grades, and Harmony Intermediate School became Harmony Middle School, with 6th–8th grades. Loudoun Valley graduated its largest class in its—as well as in the county's—history in 2011, graduating 558 students.

The current principal is Susan Ross. Ross was at the center of controversy in regards to grade tampering and grade inflation during the 2013–2014 academic school year after an article was posted in the Leesburg Today, and subsequently picked up by the Loudoun Times Mirror and Washington Post, claiming that teachers felt bullied and harassed into inflating grades. As of May 2019, the reputation of Ross has seen further decline, with local parents protesting outside of the school and creating an online petition calling for her removal as the principal of Loudoun Valley.

== Accreditation ==
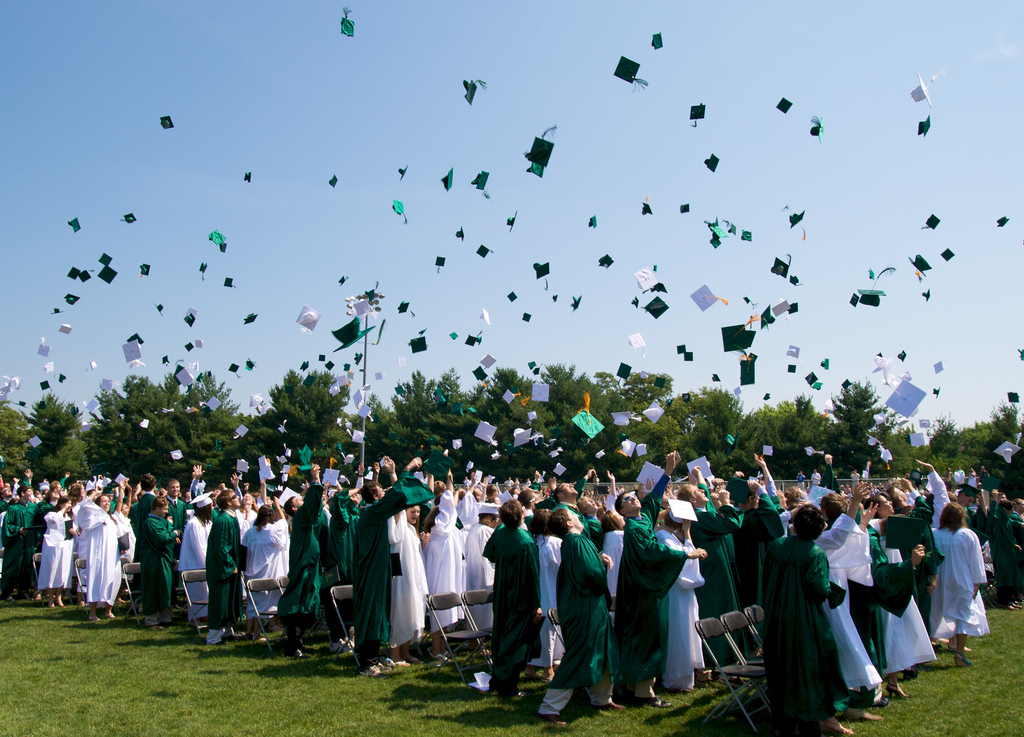
Graduation

Loudoun Valley High School is a fully accredited high school under the Virginia Department of Education's Standards of Learning tests.

== Athletics ==
Valley's mascot is a Viking, and its sports teams play in the Dulles District during regular season play. In the post-season, they compete in the Dulles District, VHSL Class 4 Region C, and the VHSL Class 4 for state.

=== District and region affiliations ===
Years	Group	District	Region	Conference
1962–2001	AA	Northwestern District	Region II	n/a
2001–2005	AA	Dulles District	Region II	n/a
2005–2007	AAA	National District	Northern Region	n/a
2007–2011	AAA	Cedar Run District	Northwest Region	n/a
2011–2012	AA	Dulles District	Region II	n/a
2012–2013	AAA	Dulles District	AAA East Region	n/a
2013–2015	3A	Dulles District	3A East Region	3A Conference 28
2015–2016	4A	Dulles District	4A West Region	4A Conference 21B
2017–Present	4A	Dulles District	VHSL Class 4 Region C	n/a

=== Athletics ===
The Loudoun Valley High School cross country team was ranked #1 in the country coming into the 2017 cross country season. They were undefeated all season and won their state meet with a perfect 15 points. They went on eventually to win the Nike Cross Nationals XC Meet with an all time low of 89 points. In the 2018 season they remained undefeated throughout the whole season, once again; winning the Nike Cross Nationals XC Meet with a new all time low of 77 points.

== Notable alumni ==
- Mark Herring, forty-eighth attorney general of Virginia
- Drew Hunter (class of 2016), signed a ten-year contract with Adidas to run professional track; former high school record holder for the indoor mile, 1500m run and 3000m run; Footlocker National Cross Country Champion (2015)
- Rob Jones (class of 2003), United States Marine and athlete
- Jimmye Laycock (class of 1966), head coach of the College of William and Mary football team
- Blair Brown Lipsitz, volleyball player for Penn State who won four consecutive NCAA national championships 2007, 2008, 2009, and 2010.
- Jordan Miller, professional basketball player
- Chip Roy (class of 1990), Republican congressman representing Texas
- Clara Schwartz, convicted murderer
- Clarence Vaughn, football safety for the Washington Redskins, two-time Super Bowl champion (XXII, XXVI), played college football at Northern Illinois University
