= Rock Ridge High School =

Location
- 43460 Loudoun Reserve Drive; Ashburn, Virginia 20148
- 38.9776729°N 77.5011712°W

Information
- School type: Public high school
- Motto: RISE
- Founded: 2014
- School district: Loudoun County Public Schools
- Principal: John Duellman
- Grades: 9–12
- Enrollment: 1,535 (2023-2024)
- Language: English
- Campus: Suburban
- Colors: Cardinal, Silver/Slate, White, and Fire
- Athletics conference: Potomac District
- Mascot: Phoenix
- Rivals: Independence High School, Lightridge High School
- Communities served: Loudoun Valley Estates; Brambleton; Moorefield Station; Loudoun Station; Arcola
- Feeder schools: Stone Hill Middle School; Rosa Lee Carter Elementary School; Creighton’s Corner Elementary School; Legacy Elementary School; Moorefield Station Elementary School; Elaine E. Thompson Elementary School
- Website: lcps.org/rockridge

Rock Ridge High School is a public secondary school in Ashburn, Loudoun County, Virginia. The school is part of the Loudoun County Public Schools system. It is currently the fourth newest high school in the school system. Rock Ridge's student body is drawn from the Ashburn and Dulles area.

They have numerous sports but the main thing is journalism, as their program, the Blaze is a winner of numerous awards such as countless Best of Snos, 2 Sno Distinguished Site, the 2025 Loudoun Now Excellence in Student Journalism Grand Price, the 2025 Loudoun Now Excellence in Student Journalism 1st place in Feature Writing, and the 2025 Loudoun Now Excellence in Student Journalism 1st place prize in podcasting.
