= Lightridge High School =

Location
- 41025 Collaboration Drive; Aldie, Virginia 20105
- 38.9205°N 77.5849°W

Information
- School type: Public High School
- Motto: "Together we light the way"
- Founded: 2020
- School district: Loudoun County Public Schools
- Superintendent: Dr. Aaron Spence
- Principal: Dr. Ryan Hitchman
- Staff: 220 staff members (2024-2025)
- Grades: 9–12
- Enrollment: 2,050 students (2024-2025)
- Language: English
- Campus: Suburban
- Colors: Powder Blue, Yellow, and White
- Mascot: Lightning Bolt
- Rival: John Champe High School
- Communities served: Old Aldie; Lenah; Willowsford; Kirkpatrick Farms; Creighton Farms
- Feeder schools: Willard Middle School; Aldie Elementary School; Buffalo Trail Elementary School; Hovatter Elementary School; Pinebrook Elementary School; Henrietta Lacks Elementary School
- Athletic Conference: Dulles District
- Website: Lightridge High School

Lightridge High School is a public high school in Aldie, Virginia. Lightridge is within the jurisdiction of Loudoun County Public Schools. The school was opened at the beginning of the 2020–21 school year.

== History ==
The name “Lightridge” was chosen to recognize the history of agriculture and dairy farming in the area. The school is located off Lightridge Farm Road and near the site of Lightridge Farm, a now-closed dairy farm which operated for more than 60 years and was the last working dairy farm in Loudoun County east of Route 15.

The land was originally owned by the Hovatter Family, who continued their farming operations up until 2017, when the land was purchased to begin construction on both Lightridge High School and the adjacent Hovatter Elementary School, which opened at the beginning of the 2021-2022 school year.

When the school opened in 2020, the COVID-19 pandemic was still ongoing, and therefore had to begin the year entirely virtual. There also was no senior class at the school that year, meaning the only grades taught that year were 9, 10, and 11.

== Enrollment history ==
Enrollment History
Year	Students
2020-2021	< 1,000
2021-2022	1,441
2022-2023	1,775
2023-2024	1,969
2024-2025	2,050

== Notable alumni ==
- Anthony Donkoh, college football offensive tackle for the Penn State Nittany Lions
