= Tuscarora High School (Virginia) =

Public high school in Leesburg, Virginia

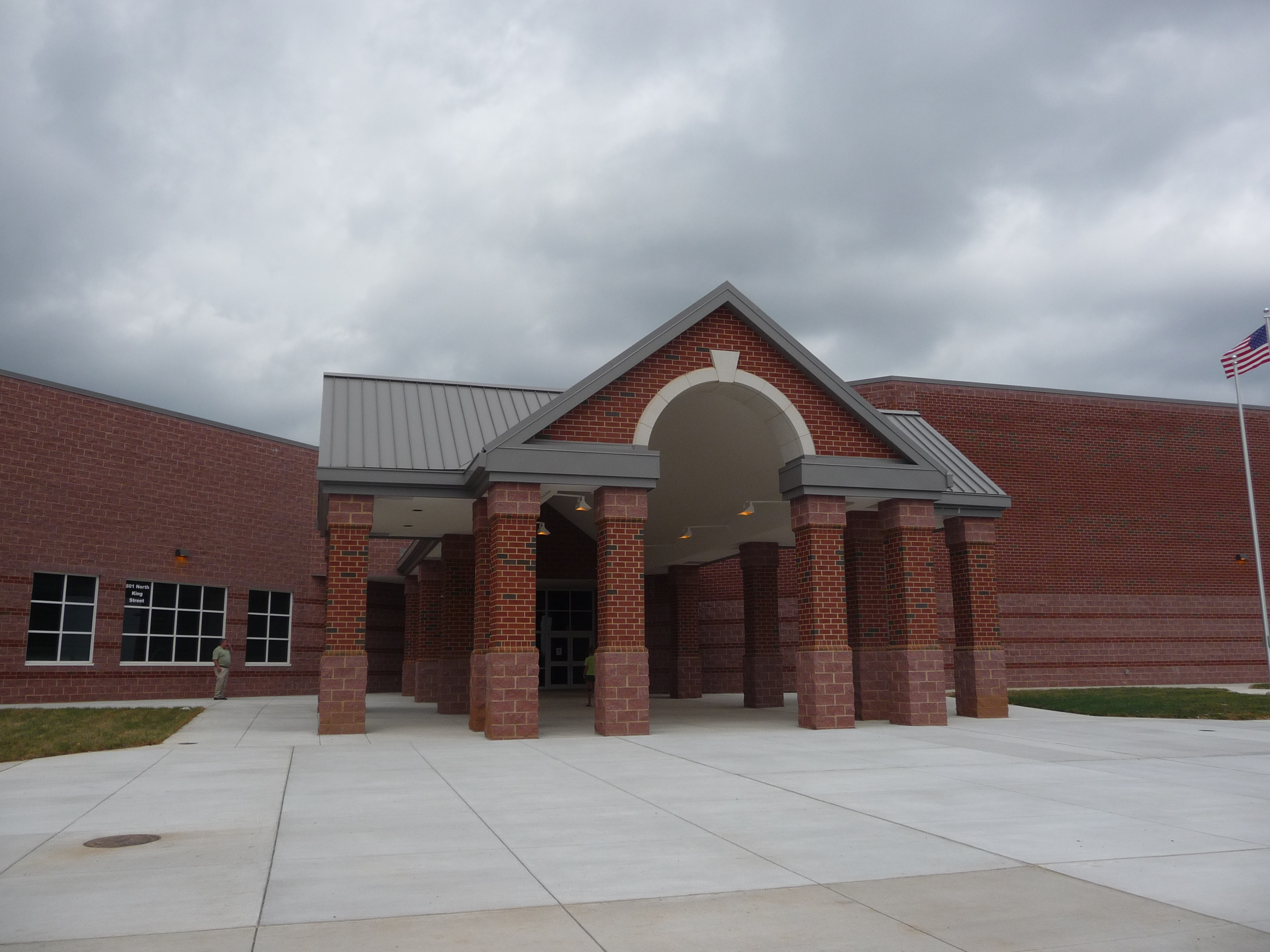

Location
- 801 N. King Street; Leesburg, Virginia 20176
- 39.1332459°N 77.5599836°W

Information
- School type: Public high school
- Motto: RISE - Respect, Integrity, Service, Excellence
- Founded: 2010
- School district: Loudoun County Public Schools
- Principal: Jonathan Bonner
- Grades: 9–12
- Enrollment: 1,520 (2018–19)
- Language: English
- Campus: Suburban
- Colors: Royal blue, black, and white
- Mascot: Husky
- Nickname: Huskies/Tusky Terror
- Rival: Loudoun County, Heritage
- Communities served: Lucketts; Potomac Crossing; Raspberry Falls; Beacon Hill
- Feeder schools: Smart's Mill Middle School; Ball's Bluff Elementary School; Richard and Mildred Loving Elementary School; Leesburg Elementary School; Lucketts Elementary School; Kenneth W. Culbert Elementary School; Catoctin Elementary School
- Athletic Conference: Potomac District
- Website: Official website

Tuscarora High School is a public high school located in Leesburg, a town in Loudoun County, Virginia, United States, and is part of Loudoun County Public Schools. The school opened in the 2010–2011 school year and consists of students from Leesburg and Lucketts.

== History ==
Tuscarora opened in the fall of 2010. The school was originally planned to open for the 2008–2009 school year, but site acquisition delays caused the school to open two years later than planned. Until the 2012 school year, with the opening of John Champe High School, Tuscarora was the largest high school in Loudoun County with a capacity of 1,800 students. Jonathan Bonner is the second and current principal at Tuscarora, succeeding Pamela Croft who retired after the 2024–2025 school year and had been the school's principal since its opening.

== Academics ==
Tuscarora High School is fully accredited. The school received the "accredited with warning" rating in the 2014–2015 school year for achieving below the standard on math benchmarks. This is the second time the school missed full accreditation for failing to meet the 75% pass rate required on state standardized tests. The school received full accreditation in 2016.

Tuscarora offers Dual Enrollment courses through Northern Virginia Community College.

== Demographics ==
The student body makeup is 52 percent male and 48 percent female, and the total minority enrollment is 41 percent.

== Band ==
The Tuscarora Marching Band is a four-time state champion, most recently as the VMBC Class 1A champions in 2023. The Marching Huskies band represented Virginia in the 2015 and 2023 Pearl Harbor Day Parade in Honolulu, Hawaii.

== Sports ==
In Fall 2014, the Tuscarora Girls Cross Country team won the first ever state championship for the school. In November 2017, the girls won their 3rd Class 5A State Title in 4 years. The Tuscarora Girls Soccer team won the 2023 VHSL Class 4 state championship, the program's first.

== Enrollment history ==
School Year	Number of Students
2010–2011	1,097
2011–2012	1,548
2012–2013	1,746
2013–2014	1,910
2022–2023	1,401
2025–2026	1,437

== Notable alumni ==
- Michael Brennan (2019), professional golfer
- Fletcher Westphal (2024), college football offensive tackle for the Florida Gators
