= Woodgrove High School =

Location
- 36811 Allder School Road; Purcellville, Virginia- 20132
- 39°9′25″N 77°43′43″W

Information
- Type: Public secondary school
- Motto: Work Honor Strive
- Founded: 2010
- School district: Loudoun County Public Schools
- Principal: William S. Shipp
- Grades: 9–12
- Enrollment: 1,542
- Colors: Navy Blue, Green, White
- Athletics conference: Potomac District; Region C
- Mascot: Wolverines
- Rival: Loudoun Valley High School
- Communities served: Purcellville; Lovettsville; Hillsboro; Waterford; Round Hill; Bluemont; Paeonian Springs
- Feeder schools: Waterford Elementary, Kenneth W. Culbert Elementary, Hillsboro Elementary, Lovettsville Elementary, Mountain View Elementary, Round Hill Elementary, and Harmony Middle School
- Website: www.lcps.org/o/whs

Woodgrove High School is a public secondary school in Purcellville, Virginia. It serves grades 9-12 for Loudoun County Public Schools.

== History ==
Woodgrove High School opened at the start of the 2010-11 school year to relieve overcrowding at Loudoun Valley High School.

In 2024, the Woodgrove High School Wrestling team became the first Loudoun County Public School to win the state championship in wrestling, and the Woodgrove High School Girls' Basketball team won the Virginia Class 4 State Championship.
