= List of things named after Frederick Douglass =

The following is a list of places and locations named after American activist and writer Frederick Douglass.

== Places ==
=== Neighborhoods ===
- Douglass, Memphis, Tennessee
- Douglass (Washington, D.C.)
- Douglas Park, Arlington, Virginia
- Douglass Place, Baltimore, Maryland

=== Parks and sites ===
- Douglass Park, Chicago, Illinois
- Frederick Douglass Bandstand at Lynn Commons, Lynn, Massachusetts
- Frederick Douglass Memorial Park, Staten Island, New York
- Frederick Douglass National Historic Site, Washington, D.C.
- Frederick Douglass Park, Indianapolis, Indiana
- Frederick Douglass Park, Lynn, Massachusetts
- Frederick Douglass Square Historic District, Boston, Massachusetts

=== Streets, bridges, and other infrastructure ===
- Frederick Douglass Circle – located at the Northwest corner of Central Park at the foot of Frederick Douglass Boulevard and of Cathedral Parkway in the New York City borough of Manhattan
- Frederick Douglass Boulevard – a continuation of Eighth Avenue north of Frederick Douglass Circle, starting at 110th Street
- Frederick Douglass Memorial Bridge, Anacostia
- Frederick Douglass–Susan B. Anthony Memorial Bridge, Rochester, New York
- Frederick Douglass Avenue-Runs from Main St to Warren Ave in Brockton, Massachusetts.
- Frederick Douglass - Greater Rochester International Airport

== Schools ==
=== Maryland ===
- Frederick Douglass High School (Baltimore, Maryland)
- Frederick Douglass High School (Prince George's County, Maryland)
- Sojourner–Douglass College

=== Missouri ===
- Frederick Douglass High School (Columbia, Missouri)
- Douglass High School (Webster Groves, Missouri), segregated school that operated from 1926 to 1956
- Douglass University, St. Louis

=== Oklahoma ===
- Frederick A. Douglass High School (Oklahoma), Oklahoma City, Oklahoma
- Douglass School (Lawton, Oklahoma), listed on the National Register of Historic Places in Comanche County, Oklahoma

=== Tennessee ===
- Douglass High School (Memphis, Tennessee)
- Douglass High School (Kingsport, Tennessee), African-American high school closed in 1966

=== Virginia ===
- Douglass High School (Leesburg, Virginia)
- Douglass School (Bristol, Virginia), listed on the National Register of Historic Places in Bristol, Virginia
- Frederick Douglass Elementary School (Leesburg, Virginia)

=== Other states ===
- Douglass Academy for Young Men, Detroit
- Douglass Center, Live Oak, Florida
- Douglass High School (Atlanta)
- Douglass High School (Texas), Douglass, Texas
- Douglass Junior and Senior High School, Huntington, West Virginia
- Douglass School (Lexington, Kentucky), listed on the National Register of Historic Places in Fayette County, Kentucky
- Frederick Douglass Academy, West Harlem, New York City
- Frederick Douglass Elementary School (Cincinnati, OH)
- Frederick Douglass High School (Evansville, Indiana)

== Other ==
- Frederick Douglass Book Center: New York City
- Frederick Douglass Prize
