= Bess (name) =

Bess is both a surname and a feminine given name. It is often short for Elizabeth. Notable people with the name include:

== Given name ==
- Elizabeth I (1533–1603), Queen of England, also known as "Good Queen Bess"
- Bess of Hardwick (1527–1608), daughter of John Hardwick of Hardwicke
- Bess Abell (1933–2020), American presidential aide
- Bess Streeter Aldrich (1881–1954), American author
- Bess Armstrong (born 1953), American actress
- Bess Atwell (born 1994), English musician
- Bess Berman (1902–1968), American record label executive
- Bess Bonnier (1928–2011), American jazz pianist, composer, and music educator
- Bess Bukodi, British professor
- Bess Phipps Dawson (1916–1994), American painter
- Bess Marie Eversull (1899–1978), first woman to earn a PhD in mathematics from the University of Cincinnati
- Bess Flowers (1898–1984), American actress
- Bess Flynn (1886–1976), American actress and writer
- Bess Freedman (born 1969), American businesswoman
- Bess Furman (1894–1969), American journalist
- Bess Goodykoontz (1894–1990), American educator
- Bess Larkin Housser Harris (1890–1969), Canadian painter
- Bess Lomax Hawes (1921–2009), American folk musician, folklorist, and researcher
- Bess Heath (born 2001), English cricketer
- Elizabeth Holland (died 1547/8), mistress of Thomas Howard, 3rd Duke of Norfolk
- Bess Houdini (1876–1943), stage assistant and wife of Harry Houdini
- Bess Hudson (1875–1961), New Zealand nurse
- Bess Johnson (c. 1902 – 1975), American actress
- Bess Kalb (born 1987), American television writer
- Bess Kargman, American filmmaker
- Bess Keaney (born 1991), Australian rules footballer
- Bess Marcus, American psychologist
- Bess Meisler (born 1922), American actress
- Bess Mensendieck (1864–1957), American physician and gymnastics teacher
- Bess Meredyth (1890–1969), screenwriter and silent film actress
- Bess Gearhart Morrison (1875–1968), American actress, educator, and speaker
- Bess Motta (born 1958), American actress, singer, choreographer, and exercise demonstrator
- Bess Myerson (1924–2014), first Jewish Miss America, and politician
- Bess Nkabinde (born 1959), South African judge
- Bess Norriss (1878–1939), Australian artist
- Bess O'Brien, American film producer and director
- Bess Price (born 1960), Aboriginal Australian activist and politician
- Bess Rogers, American indie rock musician
- Bess Rous, American actress
- Bess Whitehead Scott (1890–1997), American journalist
- Bess Stinson (1902–1996), American politician
- Bess Taffel (1913–2000), American screenwriter
- Bess Thomas (1892–1968), Australian librarian
- Bess Truitt (1884–1972), Oklahoma Poet Laureate from 1945 to 1946
- Bess Truman (1885–1982), wife of President Harry S. Truman
- Bess Bolden Walcott (1886–1988), African-American educator, librarian, museum curator, and activist
- Bess Ward, American oceanographer
- Bess Wohl, American dramatist

== Surname ==
- Brandon Bess (born 1987), West Indies Test cricketer
- Calvin Bess, Bishop of Trinidad and Tobago
- Daniel Bess, (born 1977), American television and film actor
- Davone Bess (born 1985), National Football League wide receiver
- Dom Bess (born 1997), England cricketer
- Georges Bess (born 1947), French comics artist
- Lane Bess (born 1961), American venture capitalist
- Rachel Bess (born c. 1979), American painter
- Robert T. Bess (1889–after 1958), British Guiana-born American stockbroker and civil rights activist
- Rufus Bess (born 1956), former National Football League cornerback

== Fictional characters ==
- Bess, in the opera Porgy and Bess
- Bess, an alternate personality of Jessica Buchanan in the American soap opera One Life to Live
- Bess Lindstrom, in the television series The Mary Tyler Moore Show
- Bess Marvin, one of Nancy Drew's closest friends
- Elizabeth "Bess" McCord, protagonist of the American drama series Madam Secretary

== See also ==
- Bessie
