= Douglass High School =

Douglass High School may refer to:

- Douglass High School (Atlanta, Georgia)
- Douglass High School (Kansas) in Douglass, Kansas
- Douglass High School in the Festus R-VI School District in Festus, Missouri
- Douglass High School (Webster Groves, Missouri), segregated school that operated from 1926 to 1956
- Douglass High School (Wewoka, Oklahoma) in Wewoka, Oklahoma
- Douglass High School (Kingsport, Tennessee)
- Douglass High School (Memphis, Tennessee)
- Douglass High School (Smithville, Texas) in Smithville, Texas
- Douglass High School (Leesburg, Virginia)
- Douglass School (San Antonio, Texas), also known as Rincon School
- Douglass Senior High School in Huntington, West Virginia

Frederick Douglass High School may refer to:

- Frederick Douglass Academy in New York City, New York
- Frederick Douglass High School (Baltimore, Maryland)
- Frederick Douglass High School (Columbia, Missouri)
- Frederick Douglass High School (Croom, Maryland)
- Frederick Douglass High School (Lexington, Kentucky)
- Frederick A. Douglass High School in New Orleans, Louisiana
- Frederick A. Douglass High School (Oklahoma) in Oklahoma City, Oklahoma
- Frederick Douglass School (Key West) in Key West, Florida

Fred Douglass High School may refer to:

- Fred Douglas High School (Denton, Texas) in Denton, Texas
- Fred Douglass High School (Jacksonville, Texas) in Jacksonville, Texas
- Fred Douglass High School (Sherman, Texas) in Sherman, Texas

== See also ==
- Douglas High School (disambiguation)
- Douglass School (disambiguation)
