= Douglass School =

Douglass School may refer to:

- Douglass School (Lexington, Kentucky), listed on the National Register of Historic Places in Fayette County, Kentucky
- Douglass School (Lawton, Oklahoma), listed on the National Register of Historic Places in Comanche County, Oklahoma
- Douglass School (Bristol, Virginia), listed on the National Register of Historic Places in Bristol, Virginia
- Douglass School (Key West)

== See also ==
- Douglass High School (disambiguation)
- Douglas School
