= Beus =

Beus is a surname. Notable people with the name include:

- Stephen Beus (born 1981), American pianist
- Alf Beus (1954–2024), Australian rules footballer
- Det de Beus (1958–2013), Dutch field hockey player

== See also ==
- Bess (name)
