= Leon Bahama =

Bahamian musician

- Born: Leon Randolf Hepburn; March 29, 1923; Cat Island, Bahamas
- Origin: New York City, New York, U.S.
- Died: June 1, 2024 (aged 101) Fort Pierce, Florida, U.S.
- Genres: junkanoo, jazz, calypso
- Occupation: musician
- Works: Discography
- Years active: 1944-2008
- Label: Blue Note Records
- Spouse: Annie Bell Cartwright (m. 1946-2008)
- Awards: Jazz Journalists Awards, Male Jazz Vocalist of the Year
- Website: leonbahama.com

Leon Randolf Hepburn (March 29, 1923 – June 1, 2024) known professionally as Leon Bahama, was a Bahamian musician, jazz and blues trumpeter and vocalist. He was best known for his talented music that blends blues, carnival, junkanoo, calypso, and African music styling.

Hepburn began as a jazz singer in the early 1940s, when he joined the Blues Duo group with Fats Navarro

== Early life ==
Leon Randoff Hepburn, Sr. was born on March 29, 1923 in Arthur’s Town, Cat Island, Bahamas to the parents of Moses A. Hepburn ( a fisherman) and Esther Hepburn. He was raised with three siblings and one half brother. During this childhood, he displayed a great desire for economic independence and a willingness to assist his family. At the age of 7 he became a custodian at Old Bight Elementary School in Old Bight, Cat Island. He immigrated to the United States at the age of 16 where he attended Frederick Douglas School in Key West, Florida.
