= Broad Run High School =

Public high school in Virginia, US

Coordinates: 39°01′21″N 77°29′30″W

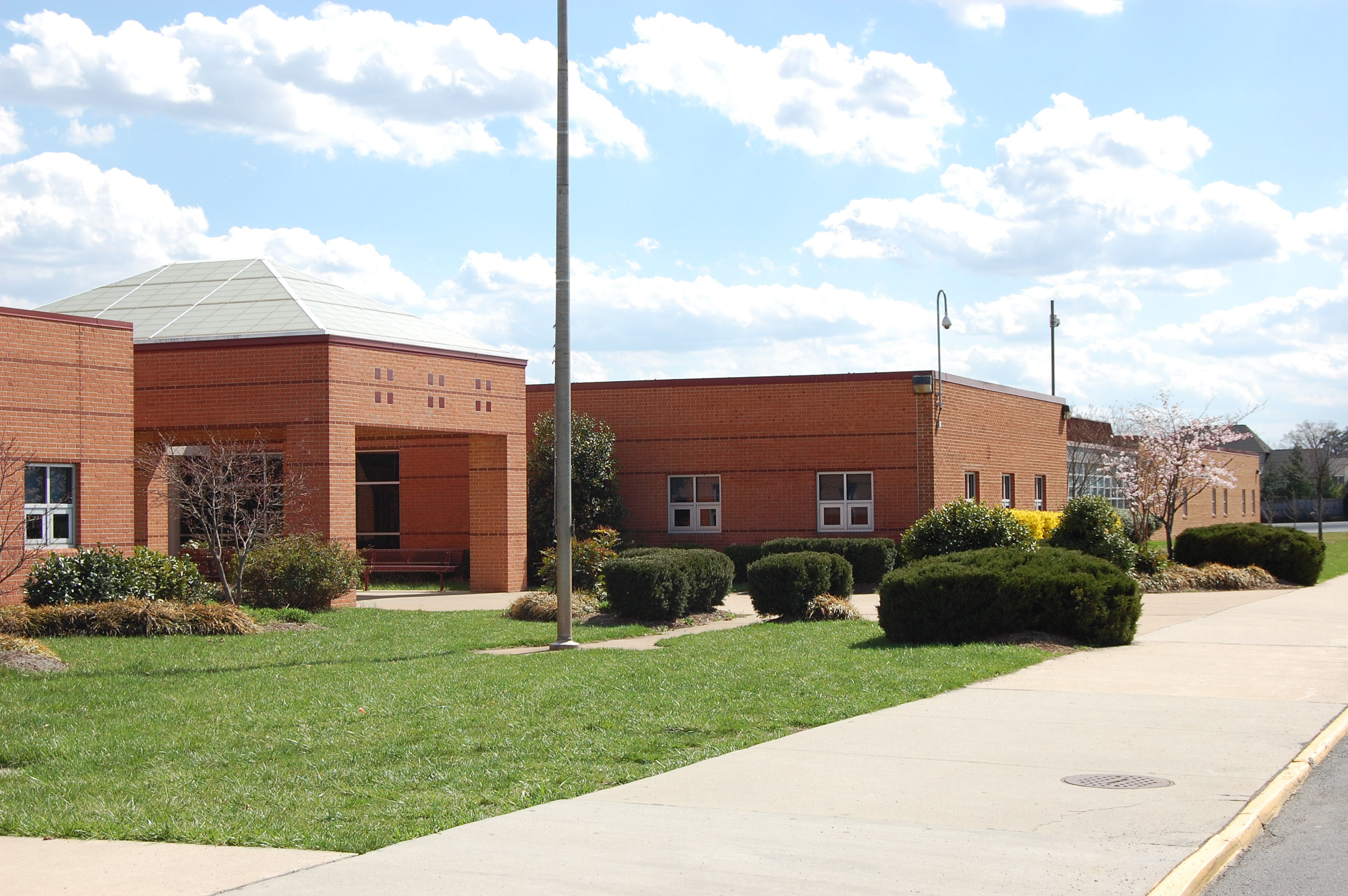

Location
- 21670 Ashburn Road; Ashburn, Loudoun County, Virginia 20147

Information
- School type: Public high school
- Opened: 1969
- Locale: Suburban, Large
- School board: Loudoun County School Board
- School district: Loudoun County Public Schools
- NCES District ID: 5102250
- Superintendent: Dr. Aaron Spence
- NCES School ID: 510225000913
- Principal: Alycia Hakes
- Teaching staff: 121.40 (on an FTE basis)
- Grades: 9–12
- Enrollment: 1,558 (2024–25)
- Student to teacher ratio: 12.83
- Language: English
- Colors: Maroon and Gold
- Mascot: Spartan
- Nickname: Cornfield High
- Rivals: Stone Bridge High School; Riverside High School
- Communities served: Ashburn Village; Farmwell Hunt; Flynn's Crossing; Ashbrook Village
- Feeder schools: Farmwell Station Middle School; Ashburn Elementary School; Discovery Elementary School; Dominion Trail Elementary School
- Athletic Conference: Dulles District; 4C North Region
- Website: www.lcps.org/o/brh

Broad Run High School is a public secondary school in Ashburn, an unincorporated area in Loudoun County, Virginia, United States. Broad Run is part of the Loudoun County Public Schools (LCPS) system. It was ranked as the #8 Best Public High School in Loudoun County and #51 in Virginia by U.S. News in 2025.

In 1969, Loudoun County opened its third public high school amidst corn fields in Ashburn to accommodate the growing student populations resulting from new housing developments in the unincorporated communities in the eastern half of the county. Since then, the county population has increased more than twelvefold (most of it in the east), straining education budgets, infrastructure, and local politics. For Ashburn, this has resulted in constantly shifting attendance boundaries, as new schools are frequently being opened at all levels: elementary, middle, and high.

Broad Run initially served all of eastern Loudoun County's population; however, since the mid-1990s, its attendance area has steadily shrunk, as numerous new high schools have been built to accommodate the county's rapid population growth driven by the tech boom. While Loudoun County's population continues to grow, enrollment in LCPS peaked in 2019 and has since declined. As a result, new school construction has closed, with Lightridge High School (opened in 2020) being the most recent school to reduce Broad Run's attendance area, and no additional high schools scheduled to open in LCPS until 2028.

The area's student demographics have significantly changed as well: Loudoun County's residents are now the country's most affluent (per capita), and its ethnic composition continues to diversify as foreign immigration into Northern Virginia increases. Broad Run High School is also located in one of the most affluent zip codes in the country, with a recorded median income of exceeding $160,000 per household as of 2025.

== History ==
Public education in Ashburn predates Broad Run's debut in 1969. In 1892, a school for Black Americans was built in Old Ashburn. At a cost of $6,000, a separate school, known as Ashburn High School, was built for both elementary and high school white students in 1911. It was a four-room wood-frame schoolhouse; additions to the original structure were made in 1922, 1930, and 1934. The school served white Ashburn students until February 14, 1944, when the entire building was destroyed by fire. Its replacement, an elementary-only brick structure, was constructed in 1945 and is still in use. Known as the Ashburn Annex, it is a training center for LCPS and has also been used for Broad Run High School population overflow.

In the 1960s high school age children from eastern Loudoun County attended Loudoun County High School. As Dulles Airport and residential developments, such as Sterling Park, opened close to the Fairfax County border, Loudoun County High School's population began to outgrow the facility. The decision to construct a high school in rural eastern Loudoun County was made. The strain on Loudoun County High School, however, was so severe that its eastern Loudoun students were temporarily schooled in the then-recently closed Douglass High School in Leesburg. Thus, the first Broad Run High School class actually formed in 1968, a full year before the Broad Run Ashburn campus construction was completed. 1968 had been the first year that the county schools were completely racially integrated, making the previously all-black Douglass High School available as it closed and its population moved to other county schools.

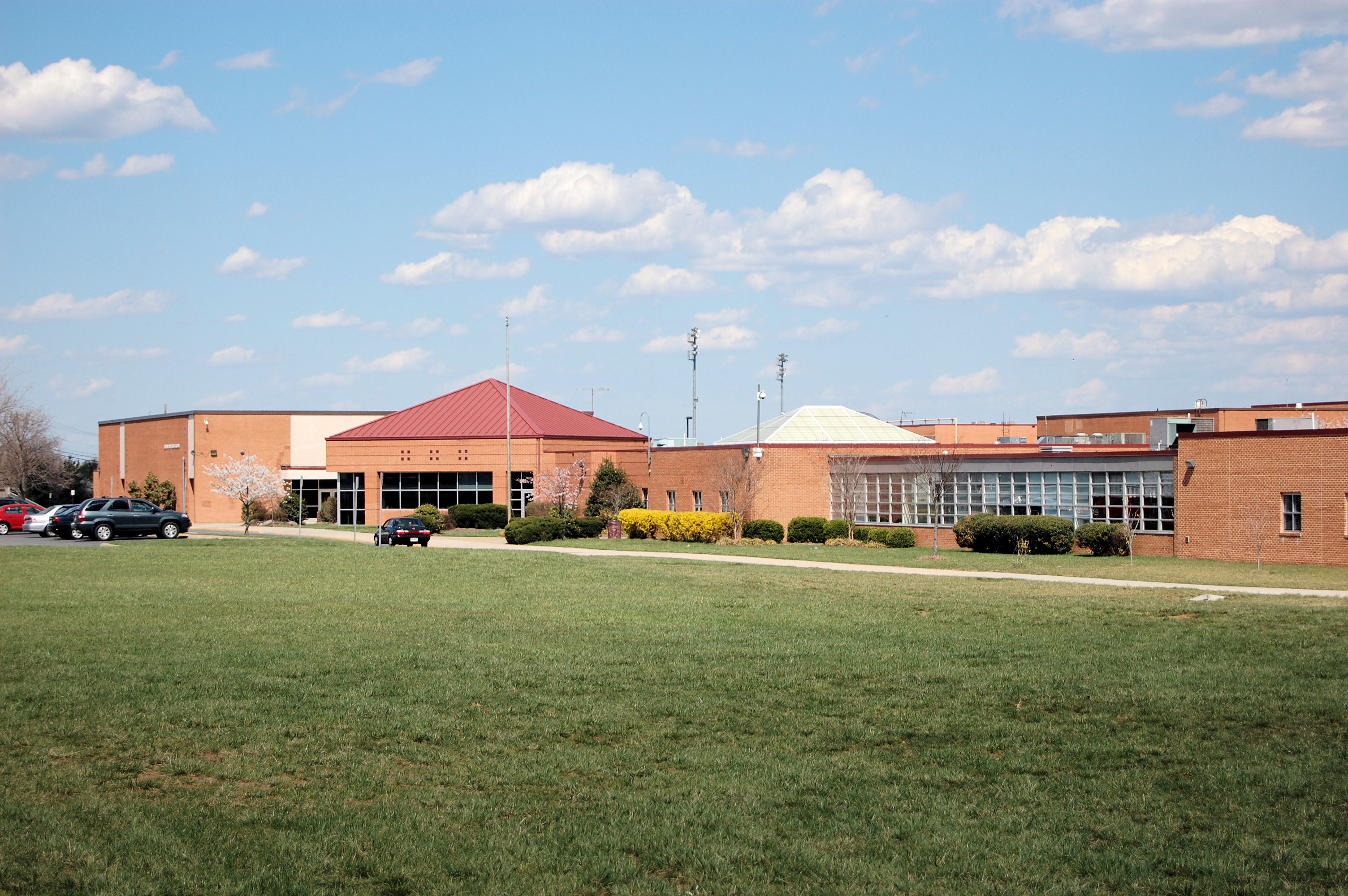
Broad Run High School 2007

The campus of the district's third high school (Loudoun County High opened in 1954 and Loudoun Valley High School opened in 1962), opened its doors in 1969 to grades 8–12, for students from all of Ashburn, Arcola, western Chantilly (now known as South Riding), and Sterling. Named for the nearby Potomac River tributary, Broad Run was dedicated on October 13, 1969. The ceremony's keynote address was delivered by then-Governor of Virginia, Mills E. Godwin Jr. At the time, Loudoun's three high schools were not limited to 9th through 12th grades since there were no middle schools. Broad Run, therefore, had a "Thetamen" class for two years, its name for eighth graders (similar to calling ninth graders "Freshmen"). In 1976 a portion of the Sterling student body was moved to Park View High School. By 1979 the Thetamen were shifted to newly opened middle schools. As the Ashburn area grew considerably, additional students shifted to Potomac Falls High School in 1997. Stone Bridge High School opened in 2000, which split the Ashburn student body into two different high schools. In 2014, Broad Run moved some of its students in the Ryan Park area to Rock Ridge High School. In 2015, Broad Run shifted students who live in University Center and Potomac Farms to Riverside High School in Lansdowne in order to relieve overcrowding. In addition to this, Broad Run also transferred students living in Ashburn Run, Timberbrooke Estates, The Ridges at Ashburn, and many other subdivisions located off of Ashburn Road to Stone Bridge.

Broad Run's enrollment was 929 on opening in 1969 (including an 8th grade class) but the county's steady population increases saw accompanying student body expansions, to 1,838 by 2012, periodically relieved as other high schools opened in eastern Loudoun County (Park View in 1976, Potomac Falls in 1997, Stone Bridge in 2000, Dominion in 2003, Freedom in 2005, Rock Ridge in 2014, Riverside in 2015, Independence in 2019, and Lightridge in 2020).

== Campus ==
The campus sits on 39.96 acres (161,700 m^{2}) along Ashburn Road, across from the Ashbriar community. It has been renovated and expanded many times since its opening in 1969 and is located ½-mile south of Farmwell Road and one mile (1.6 km) north of the Dulles Greenway.

== Students ==
The Broad Run attendance boundaries encompass the Ashburn communities of Ashburn Village, Farmwell Hunt, One Loudoun, as well as the Ashbrook residential subdivisions. The LCPS middle school Farmwell Station and, by extension, the elementary schools Ashburn, Discovery, and Dominion Trail feed students to the high school. Students living in neighboring communities outside the current attendance boundary, such as Ashburn Farm and Brambleton, have attended in previous years as a result of frequent boundary changes and the school board's policy of "grandfathering" students.

In the 2025-2026 school year, the ethnic/racial composition of Broad Run’s student body was 39.0% White, 28.1% Asian, 16.1% Hispanic, 10.6% Black, and 5.7% two or more. 22.8% of the student body is classified as Economically Disadvantaged (meaning they are eligible to participate in the federally subsidized meals program).

== Administration and faculty ==
The school's administrative team is headed by the principal and includes three assistant principals and the director of guidance. The principal and school, as part of LCPS, are under the direction of the Superintendent, who operates under the authority of the elected Loudoun County School Board.

Broad Run has had only six principals since it opened: James C. McBride (1969–1979); E. Wayne Griffith (1979–1996); Edgar T. Markley, Ed.D. (1996–2010), Doug Anderson (2010–2014), David Spage (2014–2025), and Alycia Hakes (2026-present). Its principal before Doug Anderson, Edgar T. Markley, a 2003 recipient of The Washington Post's Annual Distinguished Educational Leadership Award, retired after the 2009–2010 school year.

There are 117 teachers, yielding a teacher/student ratio of 1:14.

== Curriculum ==
Students mainly attend classes on the Broad Run campus, but have opportunities to take additional, specialized courses at LCPS's magnet and alternative schools, such as science and math at Loudoun Academy of Science or vocational education classes at C.S. Monroe Technology Center.

The school's instructional curriculum is set primarily by the LCPS district office based on Virginia Department of Education requirements. Broad Run's curriculum is typical of Virginia and United States secondary schools.

Students attending the Loudoun Academy of Science and Monroe Advanced Technical Academy do so every other class day, taking their non-magnet classes (typically core courses, such as English, social sciences and electives) at Broad Run on the alternate days.

In the 2007–2008 school year, AP Physics students at Broad Run were credited with the discovery of Asteroid 2007 TW04, which they have officially started calling "Sparta" in honor of the Broad Run's mascot, the Spartan. The team, led by their AP Physics teacher Janet Bosch, was awarded by NASA.

=== Academic performance and achievement ===
==== Accreditation ====
Broad Run is a fully accredited high school based on the Standards of Learning (SOL) examinations in Virginia. Virginia high schools are considered fully accredited if students achieve pass rates of 70% or above in three content areas (english, mathematics, and science) on SOL examinations administered during the previous school year. Broad Run's pass rates for the 2024–2025 school-year were as follows:

Subject Area	Pass Rate (%)
Reading	89
Mathematics	79
Science	78

==== NCLB and Adequate Yearly Progress (AYP) ====
To meet the requirements of the federal No Child Left Behind Act (NCLB), the state of Virginia utilizes its Standards of Learning (SOL) examinations as its progress measurement tool. NCLB requires states to set annual measurable objectives of proficiency in reading and mathematics, participation in testing, and graduation and attendance. These objectives are in addition to the high standards for learning and achievement required under Virginia's SOL program. Schools and school divisions that meet the annual objectives required by the federal education law are considered to have made adequately yearly progress (AYP) toward the goal of 100 percent proficiency of all students in reading and mathematics by 2014.

Broad Run has maintained Adequate Yearly Progress for the school years 2003–2004 through 2005–2006. The percentage of students passing the English and Math tests at Broad Run averages higher than Loudoun County as a whole, but lags slightly behind in Science by three points.

== Extracurricular activities ==
=== Athletics ===
Broad Run is a member of the AA Dulles District of the Region II of the Virginia High School League, and sponsors girls and boys athletic teams in the following sports: baseball, boys and girls basketball, cheerleading, cross-country, football, girls flag football, golf, gymnastics, boys and girls lacrosse, boys and girls soccer, softball, boys and girls tennis, track, swimming, boys and girls volleyball, and wrestling. The mascot is a Spartan.

==== Softball ====
The teams of 2000 and 2002 set new state records for various team categories, such as total runs scored in a season, consecutive shutout innings, total strikeouts in a season, and total strikeouts in one game. Christy Anch, pitcher for the Lady Spartans from 1999 to 2002, personally holds 22 individual state records in the Virginia High School League.

The girls soccer, girls lacrosse, girls softball, boys baseball, boys lacrosse, and boys track teams all won their respective district titles in 2007. Broad Run ended up winning the state championship for softball (Group AA), Broad Run's second in the past decade (won in 2000 and played in the championship 2002). Ranked fifth in the nation by USA Today with a 29–0 record, the Lady Spartans defeated New Kent County High School for the championship behind Caitlyn Delahaba's pitching (no-hitter, 12 strikeouts). Delahaba attained 400 strikeouts in 2007, third place in Virginia High School League history for strikeouts in a season.

For the second year in a row, Broad Run's softball team under the leadership of Caitlin Delahaba completed a perfect, undefeated record in softball, winning the state championship and becoming the nation's best high school softball team according to USA today.

==== Football ====
Losing seasons in 2002 and 2005 led to the replacement of Ken Belchik as head coach with Michael Burnett in 2006. The team's record was 5–5 in 2006. In 2007, the Spartans had a perfect 10–0 regular season, winning the district championship, but lost to rival Park View High School in the first playoff round. In 2008, the Spartan football team won the AA Division 4 state championship, with a 14–0 record. In 2009 the team won a second state title against Amherst. Since then, the team has continued to be successful in the regular season and playoffs, but after head coach Michael Burnett left after the 2009 season, (being replaced by an assistant coach from rival Stone Bridge - Matt Griffis) the team has not won another state title, though it made it to state finals in 2021.

Marching Arts

Marching Band

The Broad Run Marching Band is under the direction of Eric Blanks and assisted by Andy Schlaf. Every year, the band attends the annual VBODA marching assessment, and consistently gets a Superior (1) or Excellent (2) rating.

Shows
Year	Show Title	Rating
2012	Odyssey	Superior
2013	We The People	Superior
2014	Eyes in the Infinite: A Journey Through Space	Superior
2015	A Pirate's Revenge	Superior
2016	The Madness of Genius	Superior
2017	A Moment Captured	Superior
2018	What a Wonderful World	Superior
2019	Anomaly	Superior
2020		N/A
2021	Goodbye	Excellent
2022	When the Forest Calls	Excellent
2023	Masters of the Night	Superior
2024	Celestial	Superior
2025	Beneath the Surface	Superior

Indoor Drumline

The Broad Run Indoor Drumline program is under the direction of Dean Natale. It is currently combined with Dominion High School's Indoor Drumline program, and in years past, it's been combined with other schools, like Independence High School, Park View High School, and Stone Bridge High School, as well, formerly being known as Eastern Loudoun Indoor Drumline.

Broad Run High School also occasionally holds the Spartan Spectacular, combining indoor drumline and winterguard shows from across Virginia. The last time it held one was in the 2022-2023 school year.

Year	Show Title
2014-2015	
2015-2016	Voyage
2016-2017	
2017-2018	
2018-2019	Forever
2019-2020	
2020-2021	
2021-2022	Nevermore
2022-2023	In The Dark
2023-2024	N/A
2024-2025	Moonlight
2025-2026	Gold

Winter Guard

The Broad Run Winter Guard program is under the direction of Lindsay Blanks and Andy Schlaf. It has been both standalone and, in years past, combined with other schools, such as Tuscarora High School.

Feeder Pattern for the 2025–2026 school year:

- Farmwell Station Middle School
  - Ashburn Elementary School
  - Discovery Elementary School
  - Dominion Trail Elementary School

== Notable alumni ==
- Pierce Askegren, author at Marvel Comics
- Taylor Clarke, drafted as a pitcher in the 3rd round of the 2015 MLB draft by the Arizona Diamondbacks, Now plays for Kansas City Royals; attended College of Charleston
- Alex Field, played football at Virginia, and on the practice squads of the Cleveland Browns and Arizona Cardinals.
- Travis Fulgham, professional football player for the Philadelphia Eagles who played college football at Old Dominion
- Larry Izzo, football player for the New England Patriots, attended and played football from 1988 to 1990 before moving to Texas; attended Rice University.
- Connor Jessop, quarterback for the Washington Redskins and Baltimore Brigade, attended Shepherd University
- Holly King, midfielder for the Washington Spirit and Colorado Pride, head coach of the girls' soccer team at Heritage High School, attended University of Florida
- Conor Mullee, pitcher with the New York Yankees; attended Saint Peter's University
- Patton Oswalt, actor, writer, voiceover artist and comedian: graduated in 1987; attended the College of William and Mary, a member of the Broad Run Speech and Debate team who regularly contributes money to the team
- Kim Paffenroth, religious scholar, horror author, and professor at Iona University

== Former principal ==
BRHS Administrators
School Year	Principal
1969 – 1979	James C. McBride
1979 – 1996	E. Wayne Griffith
1996 – 2010	Edgar T. Markley, Ed.D.
2010 – 2014	Douglas Anderson
2014 – 2025	David Spage (retiring)
2026 onwards	Alycia Hakes
