= Vernon Barger =

American theoretical physicist

Vernon Duane Barger (born June 5, 1938, in Curllsville, Pennsylvania) is an American theoretical physicist, specializing in elementary particle physics.

== Education and career ==
Barger graduated from Pennsylvania State University in 1960 with a B.S. in engineering science and in 1963 with a Ph.D. in theoretical physics. His doctoral advisor was Emil Kazes. In the physics department of the University of Wisconsin–Madison (UW–Madison), Barger became in 1963 a research associate, in 1965 an assistant professor, in 1968 full professor, and in 1983 the J. H. Van Vleck Professor of Physics. At UW–Madison he held a Hillsdale Professorship from 1987 to 1991 and since 1991 has held a Vilas Professorship.

Barger has done research on collider physics phenomenology (especially related to the Large Hadron Collider), Higgs bosons, supersymmetry, and the Grand Unified Theory, as well as "neutrino oscillations, particle dark matter, early universe cosmology, heavy quarks and the Regge pole model."

He has held visiting appointments at CERN (1972), at Durham University (1983), at the University of Hawaii (1970, 1979, and 1982), at the Kavli Institute for Theoretical Physics in Santa Barbara, at Rutherford Appleton Laboratory (1972), at SLAC (1975), at the University of Tokyo, and at the University of Washington.

Barger was elected in 1977 a Fellow of the American Physical Society. He was a Guggenheim Fellow for the academic year 1971–1972. In 1998 he was a Frontier Fellow am Fermilab. In 2021 he received the Sakurai Prize for "pioneering work in collider physics contributing to the discovery and characterization of the W boson, top quark, and Higgs boson, and for the development of incisive strategies to test theoretical ideas with experiments."

== Selected publications ==
=== Articles ===
- Barger, Vernon D.; Cline, David B. (1967). "High-Energy Scattering". Scientific American. 217 (6): 76–91. Bibcode:1967SciAm.217f..76B. doi:10.1038/scientificamerican1267-76. JSTOR 24925922.
- Barger, V.; Whisnant, K.; Pakvasa, S.; Phillips, R. J. N. (1980). "Matter effects on three-neutrino oscillations". Physical Review D. 22 (11): 2718–2726. Bibcode:1980PhRvD..22.2718B. doi:10.1103/PhysRevD.22.2718. (over 600 citations)
- Barger, V.; Giudice, G. F.; Han, T. (1989). "Some new aspects of supersymmetry R-parity violating interactions". Physical Review D. 40 (9): 2987–2996. Bibcode:1989PhRvD..40.2987B. doi:10.1103/PhysRevD.40.2987. PMID 10012154. (over 850 citations)
- Barger, V.; Hewett, J. L.; Phillips, R. J. N. (1990). "New constraints on the charged Higgs sector in two-Higgs-doublet models". Physical Review D. 41 (11): 3421–3441. Bibcode:1990PhRvD..41.3421B. doi:10.1103/PhysRevD.41.3421. PMID 10012281.
- Barger, V.; Berger, M. S.; Ohmann, P. (1993). "Supersymmetric grand unified theories: Two-loop evolution of gauge and Yukawa couplings". Physical Review D. 47 (3): 1093–1113. arXiv:hep-ph/9209232. Bibcode:1993PhRvD..47.1093B. doi:10.1103/PhysRevD.47.1093. PMID 10015671. S2CID 7836308.
- Barger, V.; Berger, M. S.; Ohmann, P. (1994). "Supersymmetric particle spectrum". Physical Review D. 49 (9): 4908–4930. arXiv:hep-ph/9311269. Bibcode:1994PhRvD..49.4908B. doi:10.1103/PhysRevD.49.4908. PMID 10017495. S2CID 14069819.
- Barger, V.; Pakvasa, S.; Weiler, T.J.; Whisnant, K. (1998). "Bi-maximal mixing of three neutrinos". Physics Letters B. 437 (1–2): 107–116. arXiv:hep-ph/9806387. Bibcode:1998PhLB..437..107B. doi:10.1016/S0370-2693(98)00880-6. S2CID 14622000.
- Ankenbrandt, Charles M.; et al. (1999). "Status of muon collider research and development and future plans". Physical Review Special Topics - Accelerators and Beams. 2 (8) 081001. arXiv:physics/9901022. Bibcode:1999PhRvS...2h1001A. doi:10.1103/PhysRevSTAB.2.081001. S2CID 18964519. 1999 (over 550 citations)
- Alsharo'a, Mohammad M.; et al. (2003). "Recent progress in neutrino factory and muon collider research within the Muon Collaboration". Physical Review Special Topics - Accelerators and Beams. 6 (8) 081001. arXiv:hep-ex/0207031. Bibcode:2003PhRvS...6h1001A. doi:10.1103/PhysRevSTAB.6.081001. S2CID 15853526.
- Barger, Vernon; Langacker, Paul; McCaskey, Mathew; Ramsey-Musolf, Michael J.; Shaughnessy, Gabe (2008). "CERN LHC phenomenology of an extended standard model with a real scalar singlet". Physical Review D. 77 (3) 035005. arXiv:0706.4311. Bibcode:2008PhRvD..77c5005B. doi:10.1103/PhysRevD.77.035005. S2CID 26521867.
- Baer, Howard; Barger, Vernon D.; List, Jenny (2016). "The Collider That Could Save Physics". Scientific American. 314 (6): 8–10. Bibcode:2016SciAm.314f...8B. doi:10.1038/scientificamerican0616-8. JSTOR 26046974. PMID 27196826.

=== Books ===
- Barger, V. D.; Cline, D. B. (1969). Phenomenological Theories of High Energy Physics: A Experimental Evaluation. New York: Benjamin.
- Barger, V.; Olsson, M. (1973). Classical Mechanics: A Modern Perspective. McGraw-Hill. ISBN 978-0-07-003723-6.
  - Classical Mechanics: A Modern Perspective. McGraw-Hill. 1995. ISBN 978-0-07-003734-2.
- Barger, Vernon; Phillips, Roger J. N. (1987). Collider Physics. Addison-Wesley Publishing Company. ISBN 0-201-05876-6.
  - Collider Physics. CRC Press. 30 May 2018. ISBN 978-0-429-96261-5. (updated edition)
- Barger, Vernon; Marfaita, Danny; Whisnant, Kerry (30 September 2012). The Physics of Neutrinos. Princeton University Press. ISBN 978-1-4008-4559-0. hbk ISBN 978-0-691-12853-5
