= Douglas High School =

Douglas High School may refer to:

== Canada ==
- Mount Douglas Secondary School, Cadboro Bay, British Columbia

== United States ==
- Douglas High School (Alabama)
- Douglas High School (Arizona)
- Douglas High School (Minden, Nevada)
- Douglas High School (Winston, Oregon)
- Douglas High School (Box Elder, South Dakota), Box Elder, South Dakota
- Douglas High School (West Virginia), Huntington, West Virginia
- Douglas High School (Wyoming)
- Marjory Stoneman Douglas High School, Parkland, Florida
  - Stoneman Douglas High School shooting occurred on February 14, 2018
- David Douglas High School, Portland, Oregon
- Covington-Douglas High School, Covington, Oklahoma
- Douglas Anderson School of the Arts, Jacksonville, Florida
- Douglas Byrd High School, Fayetteville, North Carolina
- Douglas County High School (Colorado), Castle Rock, Colorado
- Douglas County High School (Douglasville, Georgia) — Douglasville, Georgia
- Douglas East Campus School, Douglas, Arizona
- Gen. Douglas Macarthur High School, Levittown, New York
- Juneau-Douglas High School, Juneau, Alaska
- Kirk Douglas Continuation School, Northridge, California
- North Douglas High School, Drain, Oregon
- Stephen A. Douglas High School, Philadelphia, Pennsylvania

== See also ==
- Douglass High School (disambiguation)
