= Lenton Malry =

American politician and educator from New Mexico (born 1931)

Member of the New Mexico House of Representatives
- In office 1969–1979

Member of the Bernalillo County Board of Commissioners
- In office 1981–1989

Personal details
- Born: September 30, 1931 (age 94) Keithville, Louisiana, US
- Party: Democratic
- Education: Grambling College (BS), Texas College (MA), University of New Mexico (PhD)
- Occupation: Politician, educator

Lenton Malry (born September 30, 1931) was an American politician and educator who was the first African American to serve in the New Mexico Legislature. Representing an Albuquerque district as a Democrat, Malry won election to the New Mexico House of Representatives in 1968 and served from 1969 to 1979. He also worked as a schoolteacher, principal, and county commissioner, among other roles.

== Early life and education ==
Malry was born in Keithville, Louisiana, on September 30, 1931, one of three sons of James and Mary Malry. He grew up on his parents' farm and graduated from Central Colored High School in 1948. He received his BS degree in education from Grambling College in 1952 and enlisted in the U.S. Air Force, serving in the education office at RAF West Drayton. He received his MA degree from Texas College in 1957 and his PhD from the University of New Mexico in 1968, both in educational administration. He was the first African American to earn a doctorate in education from the University of New Mexico.

== Career as educator ==
After receiving his master's degree, Malry worked as a teacher at Douglass High School in Sherman, Texas. For about four years, he worked for the Bureau of Indian Affairs, teaching first at the Kinlichee School (part of the Navajo Nation in Arizona) and then at the Gallup-McKinley County Schools in New Mexico. In 1962, he switched from teaching fourth grade to teaching at Lincoln Junior High School in Albuquerque, New Mexico. He became principal of John Marshall Elementary School in 1964 and of La Mesa Elementary School in 1968. He was the first Black male teacher in New Mexico and the first African American principal in the Albuquerque Public Schools. He became the equal opportunity director for Albuquerque Public Schools in 1975 and served in this office until 1987, when he retired to launch his own affirmative action consulting firm.

== Career as politician ==
Malry was elected to the New Mexico House of Representatives in 1968, unexpectedly ousting Republican state representative Edward Dunne in an Albuquerque-based House district that was 99% white. Malry assumed office in 1969, becoming New Mexico's first Black state legislator. He served five two-year terms until 1979. He advocated for investment in public education and universal kindergarten. In 1980, he was elected to the Bernalillo County Board of Commissioners and served two four-year terms. He was the first African American to serve as a Bernalillo County commissioner.

== Later life and legacy ==
In 1990, the University of New Mexico Hospital employed Malry in its personnel department. In 1991, he became director of New Mexico's Human Rights Division. Two years later, he became director of personnel at Arizona's Window Rock Unified School District. He sold cars at a Lincoln-Mercury dealership in Albuquerque from 1995 to 2001, topping the dealership's sales for three of those years. In 2001, Malry was hired as a special projects coordinator for the Bernalillo County Treasurer's Office. He transitioned to coordinator of the neighborhood associations program in 2004 and retired from the county government in 2011 at the age of 80. As of 2019, he lived in Albuquerque with his wife, Joy Malry, whom he had met in 1956. They have one son.

In 2016, the University of New Mexico Press published Malry's autobiography Let’s Roll this Train. He won the Father Thomas Steele History Award from the New Mexico-Arizona Book Award in 2017. He received the University of New Mexico's Living Legend Award in 2007 and achieved induction into Grambling State University's Hall of Fame in 2007. Malry has served as president of the Western Interstate Commission for Higher Education and on the boards of the University of New Mexico Cancer Center, the Heights Psychiatric Hospital, the Albuquerque Air Quality Board, and United Way.
