= Ashburn Village =

Neighbourhood in the middle of Ashburn, Virginia

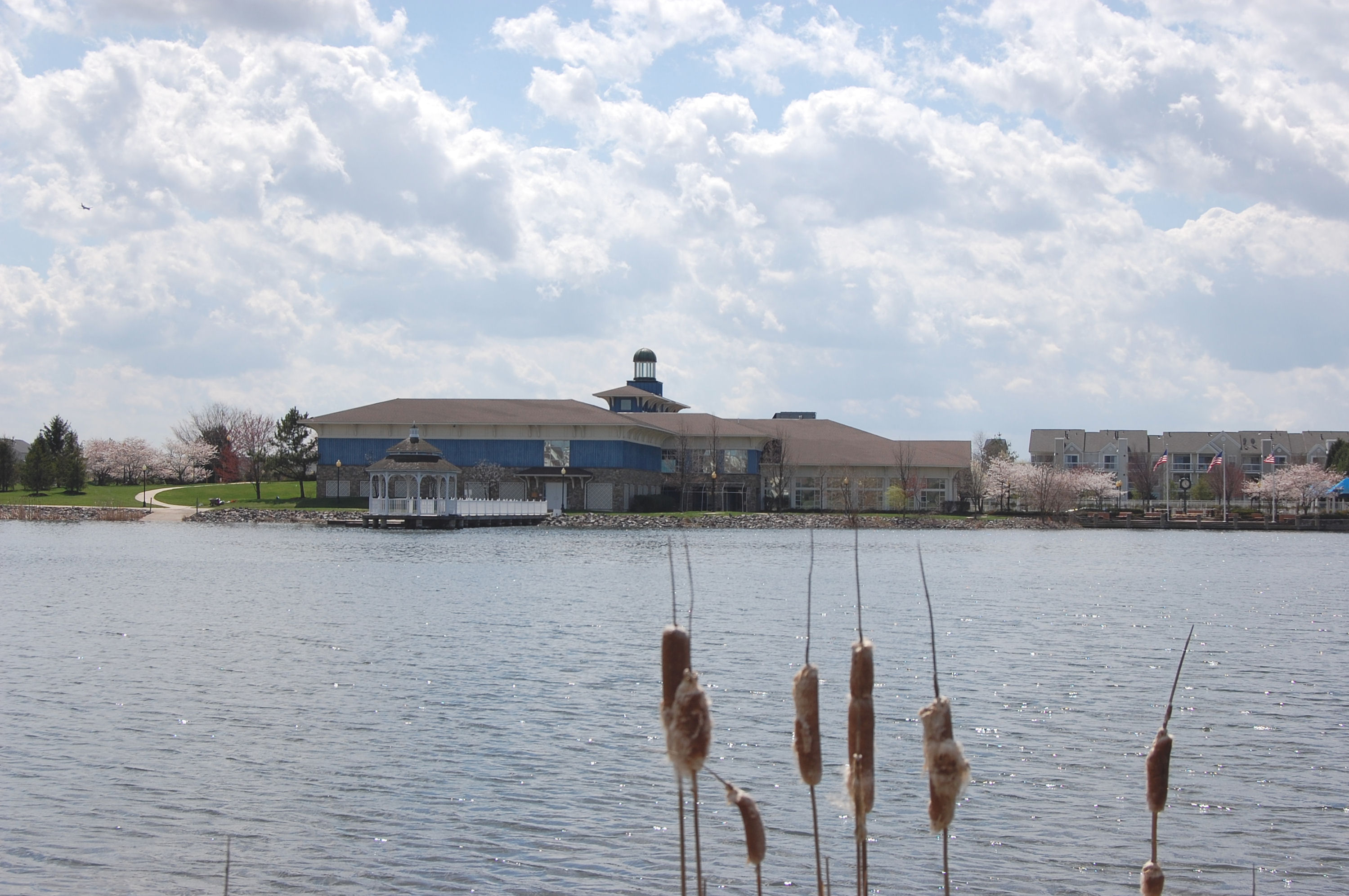
Sports pavilion across Pavilion Lake

Ashburn Village is a neighborhood of Ashburn in Loudoun County. Ashburn Village opened for development in 1987 and is nearly complete. It is situated on over 1,500 acres (6.1 km^{2}) of land, with over 5,000 residential units and 15,000 residents.

== Amenities ==
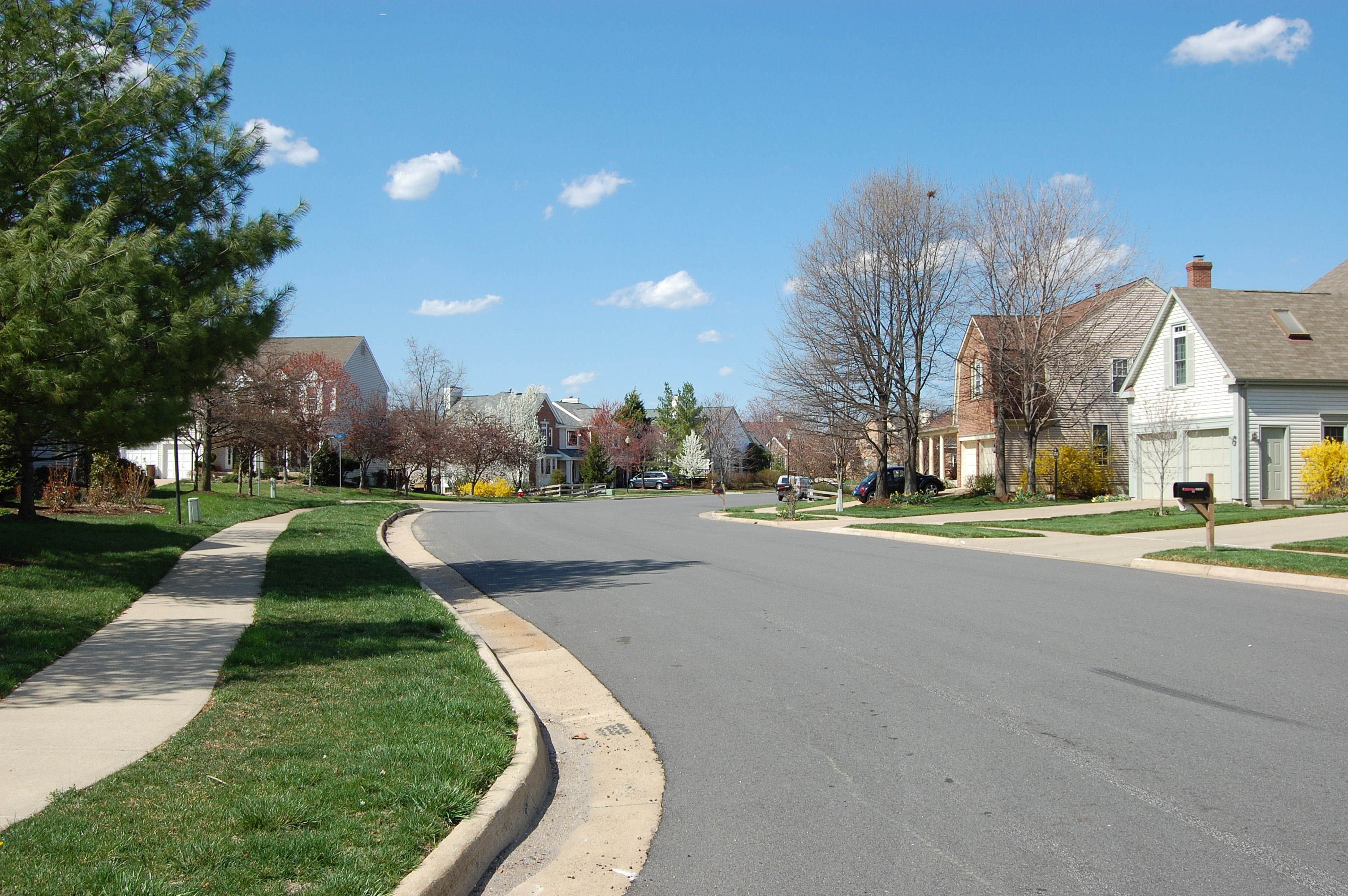
Ringold Drive

Ashburn Village has four recreation centers and five swimming pools, four outdoor and one indoor. Its largest recreation center is the Ashburn Village Sports Pavilion, located in the center of the community. The Pavilion contains a full size gymnasium, weight rooms, and enclosed tennis courts. There are also fitness classes and events held there.

Ashburn Village contains a large shopping center with restaurants, an anchor grocery store and numerous other retail outlets. It is also located close to two shopping malls, Dulles Town Center and the Leesburg Corner Premium Outlets.

The development has eight artificial ponds, which provide habitat for heron, geese and ducks. The largest, Ashburn Lake, is fed by Beaverdam Run. Stormwater from Ashburn Village drains to Russell Branch and Beaverdam Run.

In the early teens, pollinator gardens were planted around Tippecanoe, Ashburn and Beech Lakes by a local native-plants gardener. The Tippecanoe garden won the county's design award for public spaces in 2018.

== Schools ==
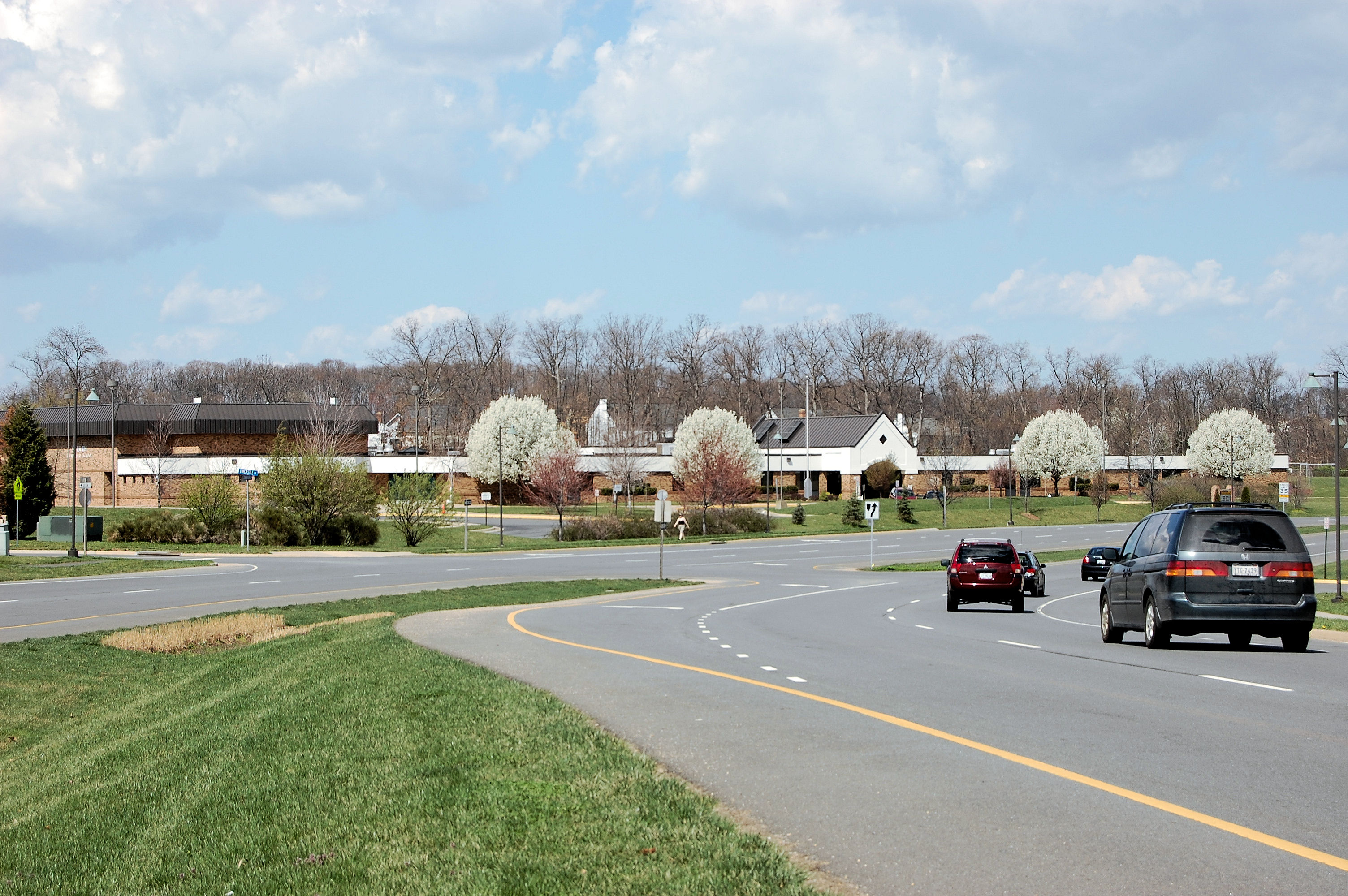
Ashburn Elementary School

School age children attending public schools are educated at two elementary schools and a middle school within the boundaries of the subdivision and one elementary school outside of it. All three schools are part of the county school system. Elementary school children (kindergarten through 5th grade) are split between three schools: students residing in the northern part go to Ashburn Elementary School, and students living in the southern part attend Dominion Trail Elementary School. A small portion of the southern part attend Discovery Elementary School.

The local middle school is Farmwell Station. Students in 9th through 12th grade attend Broad Run High School, located directly south of the community.
