= Julia Pearl Hughes =

American businesswoman

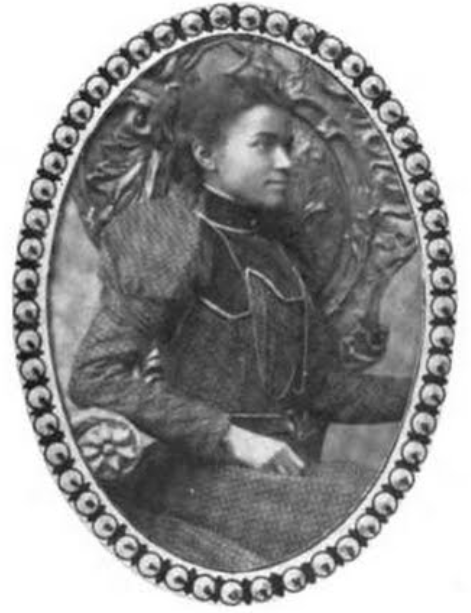
- Born: March 19, 1873; Alamance County, North Carolina
- Died: September 14, 1950 (aged 77); New York City, New York
- Other names: Julia P. H. Coleman, Julia Coleman-Robinson
- Occupations: pharmacist, entrepreneur, business executive
- Spouse(s): James Harold Coleman, Rev. John Wallace Robinson

Julia Pearl Hughes (March 19, 1873 – September 14, 1950), also known as Julia P. H. Coleman or Julia Coleman-Robinson, was a pharmacist, entrepreneur, social activist, and business executive. She was the first African-American woman pharmacist to own and operate her own drug store; much later, she was the first African-American woman to run for elective office in the state of New York.

== Early life and education ==
Hughes was born in Melville Township, Alamance County, North Carolina near the city of Mebane, North Carolina, the sixth of eight children of John and Mary (Moore) Hughes.

She was educated in local schools, and attended Scotia Seminary in Concord, North Carolina (later Barber-Scotia College) from where she graduated in 1893. After teaching school for a couple of years, she enrolled at the "Pharmaceutical College" (now the College of Pharmacy) of Howard University; she graduated with the degree of Pharm.D in 1897.

== Early career and first marriage ==
After graduation, Hughes moved to Philadelphia, Pennsylvania, where she ran the pharmacy of the Frederick Douglass Hospital (later Mercy-Douglass Hospital) at 15th and Lombard streets while taking post-graduate work at the Philadelphia College of Pharmacy (now the University of the Sciences). In 1899 she opened her own drug store at 937 Christian Street in south Philadelphia, called the Hughes Pharmacy. She was the first African-American female pharmacist to own and operate her own drug store. A contemporary newspaper account states "With every prospect of success Miss Julia P. Hughes has opened an elegantly appointed establishment... and is already doing a profitable business."

On February 16, 1900, Dr. Hughes married newspaperman James Harold Coleman, a native of Richmond, Virginia; the couple moved to Newport News, Virginia where, for four years, she operated her own pharmacy. In 1912 James Coleman was employed as a "colonization agent" for black settlers for a projected all-black town in Chaves County, New Mexico eighteen miles from Roswell, New Mexico called Blackdom. Coleman went to New Mexico, while his wife moved to Washington, D.C. to live with her stepmother and other relatives; by 1916, the couple had divorced. There were no children.

== Hair Care-Vim Chemical Company ==
By the time of her divorce, Dr. Julia P. H. Coleman had given up her drug store and with T. Thomas Fortune in March 1914 founded a weekly newspaper, the Washington Sun.

While working on the newspaper, she had been experimenting with various other ways of making a living, and had developed another career as a hairdresser. Being an experienced chemist, she experimented with various concoctions designed to grow and straighten kinky hair and eradicate dandruff; she also developed shampoos, soaps, powders and lotions.

In 1909, Dr. Coleman and her then-husband had formed the Columbia Chemical Company, whose purpose was to produce and market a hair preparation she called "Hair-Vim" specifically for African American women. The company was dissolved in September 1910. Then after returning to Washington, and with five dollars in her pocket, Dr. Coleman established the "Hair Care-Vim Chemical Company," with herself as "president and manager." The company was devoted to the production and sale of "a composition marketed as 'Hair-Vim'." She first set up shop at 643 Florida Avenue, N.W., and then moved the business to her stepmother's home at 1234 U Street, N.W. in Washington, D.C.

Dr. Coleman's business venture was very successful. She was soon able to sell her newspaper venture and devote herself full-time to the production and sale of her hair lotions, soaps, face creams, "corn salves", and shampoos. In July 1916, she expanded the company's activities to nearby Baltimore, Maryland.

Although running behind leaders in the field such as Madame C. J. Walker and Annie Turnbo Malone, Dr. Coleman kept Hair-Vim in business for almost thirty years. She provided beauty parlors with free products and encouraged the owners of the shops to use them on their clients. She also emulated Madame Walker and Mrs. Malone in developing "Beauty culture" schools promoting the "Hair-Vim" way of doing hair.

== Encounter with Jim Crow laws ==
On May 25, 1918, Dr. Coleman decided to take a trip to Baltimore, Maryland via the Washington, Baltimore and Annapolis Electric Railway, but was forced to give up her seat in the first class car because of her race. When she reached Baltimore, she secured the services of local African American attorney W. Ashbie Hawkins and sued the railroad. She won her case and was awarded damages totalling twenty dollars.

== Removal to New York ==
In 1919, according to the NAACP magazine The Crisis, Julia Coleman decided to "establish a branch (of the Hair Care-Vim Chemical Company) in New York City. She purchased a five story brownstone in Harlem at 118 West 130th street for $30,000 and moved the operations of the company there. This would be her home for nearly the rest of her life.

== Activism and second marriage ==
After settling in New York City, Dr. Coleman, along with overseeing the activities of her company, became active in many social and progressive movements. She was a member of the National Medical Association, serving for a time as the "pharmaceutical secretary". She also was active in the National Council of Negro Women, the National Association for the Advancement of Colored People and the local chapter of the National Urban League as well as several church groups and local civic groups. For example, in December 1927, she was elected president of the Federation of Colored Women's Clubs of New York City; she was elected in part, as a contemporary newspaper account states, due to her successful tenure as "head of the business department of the State Federation of Colored Women's Clubs.' She sought to establish a home in Harlem for "delinquent girls". She served in leadership of women's clubs with singer turned organizer Nannie C. Burden.

In 1920, with a number of black leaders, including William Pickens, Chandler Owen, Robert S. Abbott, and John E. Nail, she signed a letter to Attorney General Harry M. Daugherty urging the vigorous prosecution of black nationalist Marcus Garvey on charges of mail fraud. Garvey attacked them, calling them "race traitors" and singling out Dr. Coleman as "a hair straightener and a face bleacher."

Dr. Coleman also became involved in local politics, being affiliated with the Republican Party. In September 1924, she ran for the Republican Party nomination for the New York State Assembly from the Nineteenth District, stating that "she expects to arouse the colored woman as never before to their political duty." She, however, lost the primary election to Abraham Grenthal, an attorney and the Republican party boss of the district.

On August 12, 1930, in Washington, Dr. Coleman married the Reverend John Wallace Robinson, pastor of St. Mark's Methodist Episcopal Church in Harlem, and after his retirement, pastor of Christ Community Church of Harlem, founded in 1935. They were married for eleven years, until Reverend Robinson's death in November 1941.

After Reverend Robinson's death, Julia Coleman-Robinson gradually withdrew from both the business and social worlds, and she died in September 1950. She is buried next to her second husband at Frederick Douglass Memorial Park on Staten Island, New York.
