= Robert T. Bess =

British Guiana-born American stockbroker

Robert Theophilus Bess Jr. (February 5, 1889 – after October 1958) was a British Guiana-born American stockbroker, civil rights activist, public relations manager, and pharmacist. He founded the R. T. Bess Company in New York City, a stock brokerage firm, which was the only black-owned stock brokerage on Wall Street in 1932. He was also the only black stockbroker in New York City the early-1930s. Bess founded the Anti-Discrimination Job League, Inc. in 1936, which worked to fight for law change in New York and nationally. Starting in 1947, he formed Robert T. Bess Assoc., a public relations firm.

== Biography ==
Bess was born a British subject in Plaisance, British Guiana (today Guyana), one of three sons of parents Isabella Elizabeth (née Cappell) and Robert T. Bess. One of his brothers, Dr. Edward E. Bess (1895–1956) became president of the local NAACP branch from 1939 to 1940. Bess worked as a pharmacist in his early career in British Guiana between 1911 and 1921. In 1913, he married Ellen Maud Talbot, and together they had 4 children. He was a Methodist and a member of the St. Mark's Methodist Episcopal Church (now St. Mark's United Methodist Church) in New York.

From 1923 until 1933, he was the founding president of the R. T. Bess Company (also known as Robert T. Bess Corp.), a stock brokerage firm, initially located at 206-208 Broadway Street, New York City. He became a naturalized American citizen in 1927.

In 1931, he was taken to court on larceny charges related to the R. T. Bess Company, and he was exonerated of the charges a few months later. In 1932, his company was the only Black-owned stock brokerage on Wall Street, and he was reportedly the only black stockbroker. The company was able to survive the Wall Street crash of 1929 and the resulting economic turmoil by "sticking at the wheel". During this time, Bess employed 9 white and 6 black office workers, and "promoted the interests of the Standard Television and Electric Company", asserting that they "offered an opportunity to colored people to reap millions of dollars in profit".

Bess worked as an organizer for the Consolidated Tenants League, Inc. of Harlem. Starting in 1936, he was the founding president of the Anti-Discrimination Job League, Inc., and the National Anti-Discrimination Movement. Bess and the Anti-Discrimination Job League, Inc. lectured and fought for many years for the passage of laws to protect people from discrimination by insurance companies and employment agencies. The group supported the passage of the Ives-Quinn Act (signed in 1945 by Governor Thomas E. Dewey).

From 1943 to 1950, he worked as a pharmacist in New York City. Starting in 1947, he formed Robert T. Bess Assoc., a public relations firm located at W. 125th Street in West Harlem, New York City.

He authored, "Ethiopia Shall Stretch Forth Her Hands to God" (1949). Bess was the founding president of the Nannie C. Burden Book Lovers Club, Inc. He eulogized Nannie C. Burden on Decoration Day in 1950 at the Frederick Douglass Memorial Park cemetery. In October 1958, he was noted to be scheduled to speak at a public meeting on responding to the possibility of a hydrogen bomb attack.
