= Alex Field =

American football player (born 1986)

Profile
- Position: Defensive end

Personal information
- Born: December 23, 1986 (age 39); Nashua, New Hampshire, U.S.
- Listed height: 6 ft 7 in (2.01 m)
- Listed weight: 288 lb (131 kg)

Career information
- College: Virginia
- NFL draft: 2009: undrafted

Career history
- New York Giants (2009)*; Arizona Cardinals (2009)*; Cleveland Browns (2009)*
- * Offseason or practice squad member only

Alexander Marshall Field (born December 23, 1986) is an American former football defensive end. He was signed by the New York Giants as an undrafted free agent in 2009. He played college football at Virginia.

Field is a graduate of Broad Run High School in Ashburn, Virginia.

Field was also a member of the Arizona Cardinals and Cleveland Browns.

== References and external links ==
- Arizona Cardinals player page
- Virginia Cavaliers player page
