= Charles Napoleon Moore =

American mathematician (1882–1967)

- Born: 1882
- Died: 1967 (aged 84–85)
- Education: University of Paris, Harvard University
- Occupation: Mathematician
- Known for: Convergence factors

Charles Napoleon Moore (1882–1967) was an American mathematician at Bowling Green State University who worked on convergence factors.

He was an Invited Speaker at the ICM in 1932 in Zürich.

His first doctoral student was Bess Marie Eversull.

== Selected publications ==
- Moore, Charles N. (1919). "Applications of the theory of summability to developments in orthogonal functions". Bull. Amer. Math. Soc. 25 (6): 258–276. doi:10.1090/s0002-9904-1919-03188-7. MR 1560186.
- Moore CN (October 1922). "Generalized limits in general analysis". Proc Natl Acad Sci U S A. 8 (10): 288–293. doi:10.1073/pnas.8.10.288. PMC 1085150. PMID 16586899.
- Moore, C. N. (1931). "Types of series and types of summability". Bull. Amer. Math. Soc. 37 (4): 240–250. doi:10.1090/s0002-9904-1931-05138-7. MR 1562130.
- Moore CN (1932). "On certain criteria for Fourier constants of L integrable functions". Proc Natl Acad Sci U S A. 18 (5): 396–399. doi:10.1073/pnas.18.5.396. PMC 1076236. PMID 16587701.
- Moore CN (1933). "On criteria for Fourier constants of L integrable functions". Proc Natl Acad Sci U S A. 19 (9): 846–848. doi:10.1073/pnas.19.9.846. PMC 1086198. PMID 16577580.
- Moore CN (March 1936). "Convergence factors for double series summable by Nörlund means". Proc Natl Acad Sci U S A. 22 (3): 167–170. doi:10.1073/pnas.22.3.167. PMC 1076730. PMID 16588067.
- Summable series and convergence factors. Colloquium Publications, Vol. 22. Providence: AMS. 1938.
