= Nannie C. Burden =

American operatic soprano (1891–1947)

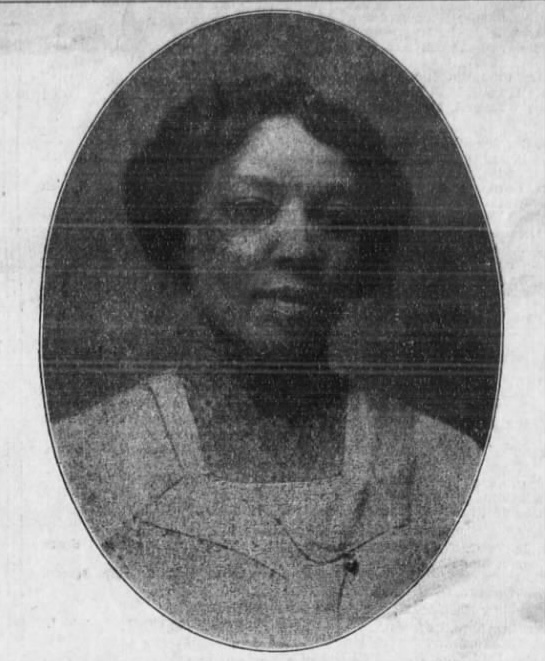
Nannie Burden in The Kansas City Sun, May 23, 1914

Nannie C. Burden (1891–1947) was a Coloratura soprano and clubwoman in New York City. She also ran for political office.

She was described as an operatic soprano of international reputation and as one of the "most charming and accomplished" sopranos of African American heritage. In October 1916, she performed at a church in Philadelphia. She was involved with the National Association of Colored Women, and her address was listed as 2 Fourth Street, Nicholas Place, Apartment 42 in New York City. In 1929, she was named regional president of the Empire State Federation of Women's Clubs. She chaired the Burden Artist Bureau. Julia P. H. Coleman was the group's secretary. She was a member of the St. Mark's Methodist Episcopal Church (now St. Mark's United Methodist Church) in New York.

She is buried at Frederick Douglass Memorial Park on Staten Island. Robert T. Bess eulogized her at the cemetery on Decoration Day in 1950. Bess founded the Nannie C. Burden Book Lovers Club, Inc. and served as its president.
