= Connor Jessop =

American football player (born 1993)

Personal information
- Born: December 27, 1993 (age 32); Ashburn, Virginia
- Listed height: 6 ft 5 in (1.96 m)
- Listed weight: 220 lb (100 kg)

Career information
- High school: Broad Run (Ashburn, Virginia)
- College: Virginia Tech (2012); Shepherd (WV) (2015–2017)
- NFL draft: 2018: undrafted

Career history
- Washington Redskins (2018)*; Baltimore Brigade (2019)*
- * Offseason or practice squad member only

Awards and highlights
- MEC Offensive Player of the Year (2017); NCAA Division II All-American (2017)

Connor Jessop (born December 27, 1993) is an American former football quarterback. He played college football at Shepherd University. He signed with the Washington Redskins as an undrafted free agent in 2018.

== Early life ==
Jessop attended Broad Run High School in Ashburn, Virginia, and he led the Spartans to a state championship during his sophomore season.

== College career ==
Jessop was offered a scholarship to play football at the University of Richmond; however, he declined the school's invitation and joined his favorite college team, the Virginia Tech Hokies, as a walk-on.

He transferred from Virginia Tech to Shepherd University in 2015. As a backup quarterback, he was forced into action in the NCAA Division II semifinals when Shepherd's starting quarterback, Jeff Ziemba, was injured in the first quarter. Jessop led the Rams to a 34–32 victory over Grand Valley State.

Jessop's first start for the Rams came on October 15, 2016, when he accounted for seven touchdowns (five passing, two rushing) in a 70–24 win over West Virginia State. He set a school record in the game by passing for 480 yards, and the five touchdown passes tied a record; he was named the Mountain East Conference Offensive Player of the Week.

Jessop became the Rams' full-time starter in the 2017 season, during which he threw for 40 touchdowns and just nine interceptions. He was named the Mountain East Conference Offensive Player of the Week four times during the season. At season's end, he was named the MEC Offensive Player of the Year, and he finished fourth in voting for the Harlon Hill Trophy. He was named a Division II All-American.

Jessop served as an assistant coach with Shepherd prior to the 2018 season.

== Professional career ==
Ahead of the 2018 NFL draft, Jessop participated in a Pro Day at West Virginia University, where he performed well in the broad jump and 40-yard dash.

=== Alliance of American Football ===
In August 2018, Jessop was signed by the Phoenix franchise of the Alliance of American Football to be a part of the team's 2019 roster.

=== Washington Redskins ===
Though he was not selected in the NFL Draft, Jessop was invited by the Washington Redskins to attend their rookie mini-camp. He was signed by the Redskins on August 26, 2018, after reserve quarterback Colt McCoy was injured, to serve as the backup quarterback during the team's final preseason game. He was waived on September 1, 2018.

=== Baltimore Brigade ===
On April 6, 2019, Jessop was assigned to the Baltimore Brigade.

== Personal life ==
Jessop's favorite football team growing up was the Dallas Cowboys. He stated that Peyton Manning and Tony Romo were among his favorite quarterbacks to watch.
