= Floyd J. Calvin =

American journalist (1901–1939)

Floyd Joseph Calvin (13 July 1901 – 1 September 1939) was an American reporter, columnist, radio host, and news service founder. He worked at The Messenger magazine in New York City and then as a New York correspondent for the Pittsburgh Courier newspaper which, along with the Chicago Defender, were the largest newspapers for African Americans in the country. He founded Calvin News Service which was syndicated by African American weekly newspapers.

He was born in Washington, Arkansas. He studied at Shover State Teacher Training College in Hope, Arkansas.

In 1927 his radio show sponsored by the Courier was broadcast on WGBS.

He traveled extensively and wrote about lynching. He wrote about relations with Catholics. He was critical of Marcus Garvey's plans to entice African Americans to relocate to a colony in Liberia. He described the desire of Blacks to exit the south as a reaction to lynching.

He married Willa Lee Johnson and they had three children. Floyd Calvin Jr. died at a young age.

He is buried at Frederick Douglass Memorial Park in Staten Island.

== Bibliography ==
- "Eight Weeks in Dixie", January 1923, Pittsburgh Courrier

== See also ==
- Harlem Renaissance
