= Pierce Askegren =

American writer (1955–2006)

- Born: John Pierce Askegren; June 9, 1955; Mt. Lebanon, Pennsylvania, U.S.
- Died: November 29, 2006 (aged 51); Annandale, Virginia, U.S.
- Education: Broad Run High School; James Madison University (BA)

John Pierce Askegren (June 9, 1955 – November 29, 2006) was an American author best known for his adaptations of licensed properties, particularly those of the comic book company Marvel Comics.

== Biography ==
Pierce Askegren was born in the Pittsburgh, Pennsylvania, suburb of Mount Lebanon, and had two brothers, James W. and Robert, and a sister, Margaret. They grew up with their parents, Kenneth and Jacqueline Askegren, in Lynchburg, Virginia; Montgomery, Alabama; and North Carolina before his family in 1970 settled in northern Virginia. He attended Broad Run High School in Ashburn, Virginia, graduating in 1973, and went on to earn a Bachelor of Arts degree in communication arts from James Madison University in 1978.

Askegren got his start in the comics industry with three short stories published in 1979 and 1980 in Warren Publishing's black-and-white horror-comics magazines Creepy and Vampirella, beginning with the eight-page "Hell's Playground", illustrated by Leo Duranona, in Creepy No. 108 (June 1979). His regular employment, however, came as a manager at Crown Book Stores in the Washington, D.C., area, and later as a technical writer first at ACS Corporation and then at C2 Corporation in the Tysons Corner, Virginia, area.

Askegren began his reentry into pop culture by corresponding with Greg Theakston in the early 1990s. Askegren eventually became the copy editor for Theakston's Bettie Pages while submitting his prose to publishing houses. By the mid-1990s, he was writing prose short stories for anthologies starring Marvel Comics characters, beginning with "The Broken Land" in The Ultimate Silver Surfer (1995). He also contributed to The Ultimate Super-Villains (1996), Untold Tales of Spider-Man (1997), The Ultimate Hulk (1998) and The Chick Is in the Mail (2000). He also did novelizations, serving as the ghost writer of Spider-Man and the Incredible Hulk: Rampage (1996); as co-author with Danny Fingeroth of Spider-Man and Iron Man: Sabotage (1997); as co-author with Eric Fein of Spider-Man and Fantastic Four: Wreckage (1997); and as author of Marc Miller's Traveller: Gateway to the Stars (1998), Fantastic Four: Countdown to Chaos (1998) and The Avengers and the Thunderbolts (1999).

Outside the realm of licensed properties, he wrote the "Inconstant Moon" trilogy of science-fiction novels, about corporate colonies on the moon: Human Resource (2005), Fall Girl (2005) and Exit Strategy (2006).

His last short story, "Try and Try Again," appeared in the anthology Time Twisters, released posthumously in January 2007. In 2010, his Buffy the Vampire Slayer novelization, After Image (2006), was rereleased, along with two other Buffy books.

Askegren was found dead in his Annandale, Virginia, apartment on November 29, 2006, after suffering a heart attack on an unreported date.

== Books ==
=== Franchise novels ===
- Spider-Man: Doom's Day
  - Spider-Man and The Incredible Hulk: Doom's Day 1: Rampage (Berkley Boulevard, 1996) uncredited (with Danny Fingeroth)
  - Spider-Man and Iron Man: Doom's Day 2: Sabotage (Berkley Boulevard, 1997) (with Danny Fingeroth)
  - Spider-Man and Fantastic Four: Doom's Day 3: Wreckage (Berkley Boulevard, 1997) (with Eric Fein)
- Gateway to the Stars: Marc Miller's Traveller (1998)
- The Avengers and the Thunderbolts (1998)
- Fantastic Four: Countdown to Chaos (1998)
- Alias (with J. J. Abrams)
- Angel: The Longest Night, Volume One (Simon and Schuster Children's Publishing, 2002)
- Collateral Damage (2005)
- Buffy the Vampire Slayer: After Image (Simon and Schuster/Spotlight Entertainment, 2006)

=== Series ===
- Inconstant Moon:
  - Human Resource (2005)
  - Fall Girl (2005)
  - Exit Strategy (2006)

=== Short stories ===
- "Horse Laugh "(1979)
- "The Broken Land" (1995)
- "Private Exhibition" (1996)
- "Better Looting Through Modern Chemistry" (with John Garcia) (1997)
- "Pitfall" (1998)
- "Foxy Boxer Gal Fights Giant Monster King!" (2000)
- "Where the Bodies Are Buried" (2001)
- "Try and Try Again" (2007)
