= Bess Gearhart Morrison =

American actress and educator

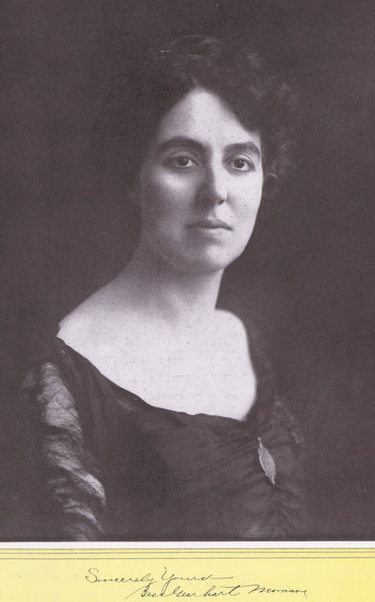
Bess Gearhart Morrison, from a 1917 promotional brochure.

Bess Gearhart Morrison (June 24, 1875 – June 24, 1968) was an American actress and educator, and a speaker on the Chautauqua and lyceum adult education circuits.

== Early life ==
Florence Elizabeth "Bess" Gearhart was born in Curllsville, Pennsylvania, and raised near Lincoln, Nebraska, the daughter of James Randolph Gearhart and Emaline Miller Gearhart. Her father was a Methodist minister, and as a girl she would sometimes play organ at the services he conducted. She attended the Columbia College of Expression in Chicago, and earned a Bachelor of Elocution degree from Nebraska Wesleyan University in 1902.

== Career ==
Bess Gearhart Morrison was a teacher in her teen years, at a small schoolhouse in rural Nebraska. She was best known as a speaker touring on the Chautauqua and lyceum circuits, as well as churches, schools, teachers' institutes and professional meetings. She recited poetry, told stories, and reproduced whole plays from the platform, for audiences across North America. "She is undoubtedly one of the best entertainers and dramatic readers now on the platform," a California newspaper noted in 1919. "There is an atmosphere about her work that is helpful, healthful and invigorating."

In 1918, she was tapped to head the drama program at the Ellison-White Conservatory of Music in Portland, Oregon. She also organized and coached other touring acts, such as "The Old-Fashioned Girls", a quartet of young women singing songs and wearing costumes from the era of the American Civil War for gatherings of veterans, and "The International Trio", a concert group of European musicians.

Morrison starred in one silent film, The Miracle of Money (1920). In 1926, she played the central "World Spirit" in a missionary society pageant featuring children of various nationalities, in Lincoln. She continued giving readings and performances through the 1930s, and into the 1940s.

== Personal life ==
Bess Gearhart married Lorenzo Duer Morrison in 1900; they had children Donald (1902–1958), Margaret (1907–1962), and Elizabeth (born and died 1914). She was widowed in 1950 and moved from Nebraska to Long Beach, California. She died in a nursing home in Whittier, California in 1968, aged 93 years.
