= Bess Marie Eversull =

American mathematician (1899–1978)

- Born: May 18, 1899; Elmwood Place, Ohio
- Died: March 18, 1978 (aged 78); Detroit, Michigan
- Burial place: Evergreen Cemetery in Detroit
- Other name: Bess Allen
- Education: University of Cincinnati
- Occupations: Mathematician, professor
- Spouse: Earning her PhD before World War II

Bess Marie Eversull Allen (1899 – 1978) was an American mathematician and one of the few women to earn a PhD in mathematics in the United States before World War II. She was the first woman to earn a PhD in mathematics from the University of Cincinnati.

== Biography ==
Bess Eversull was born May 18, 1899, in Elmwood Place, Ohio, a village that was next to Cincinnati but has since become nearly surrounded by that city. Her parents were Warner Solomon Eversull and Olive Magrew.

=== Education ===
Eversull attended Woodward High School in Cincinnati and then attended the University of Cincinnati where she graduated with her bachelor's degree in 1921, majoring in both mathematics and English and minoring in French. After graduation, Eversull remained at Cincinnati for her graduate studies. Her 1922 master's thesis and her 1924 doctoral dissertation both concerned triple Fourier series and each document was published soon after it was completed. When she finished her PhD, she was the first doctoral student of mathematician Charles Napoleon Moore and the first woman, and only the third person, to earn a doctorate in mathematics at Cincinnati.

For three years (1924–1927) Bess Eversull was an instructor at Smith College until she married a civil engineer, Charles Easton Allen in October 1927 and she took the name Bess Allen. Shortly thereafter, the couple moved to Detroit and for most of the next 20 years, she volunteered in the community except for 15 months during World War II when she worked as a mathematician for a group making films for the U.S. military, from May 1942 until August 1943. Even though she was a married woman, which often disqualified her from finding employment outside the home, she did manage to find some work as a tutor and substitute teacher during that time.

In February 1947, Allen took a job as a regular substitute instructor at Wayne University (now Wayne State University). Over the following years, she was promoted to instructor 1948–1950, assistant professor 1950–1959, associate professor 1959–1964, and associate professor emeritus after she retired in 1964. After her retirement, she taught for a few more years at the Detroit Institute of Technology.

Bess Allen, who remained childless, died March 18, 1978, at the family home in Detroit, Michigan, and her remains were interred at the Evergreen Cemetery in Detroit.

== Memberships ==
According to Judy Green, Allen belonged to several professional societies.

- American Mathematical Society
- Mathematical Association of America
- American Association for the Advancement of Science
- American Association of University Women
- Phi Beta Kappa
