= Rachel Bess =

American artist

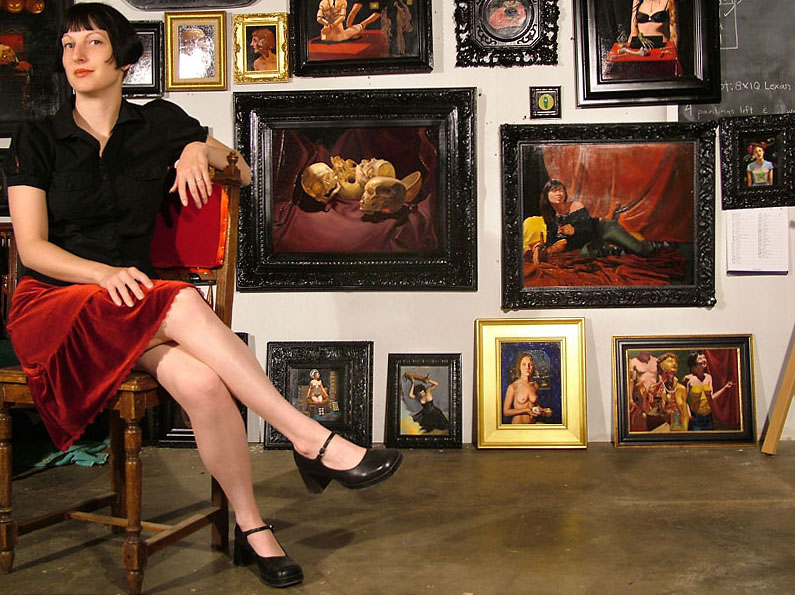
- Bess in 2005
- Born: 1979 (age 46–47)
- Known for: Painting

Rachel Bess (born c. 1979) is an American painter and writer from Phoenix, Arizona.

== Biography ==
Bess got her BFA degree in painting from the Honors College at Arizona State University in 2001. She taught life drawing and painting at New School for the Arts and Academics in Tempe, Arizona from 2002 to 2007 before leaving academia to paint full-time.

Bess is known for her highly realistic, sometimes surrealistic, baroque-style oil paintings on panel. Her work has drawn comparisons to that of the Dutch Masters, as well as to certain subgenres of the lowbrow art movement.

In 2014 she was awarded the Arlene and Morton Scult Contemporary Forum Artist Award (the Contemporary Forum is a support organization of the Phoenix Art Museum).

Bess prepared a series of paintings to exhibit at Art Miami 2016. They consisted of paintings of rotting fruit, a subject she'd been working on for several years, which are a comment on the human body, aging, and death. In December 2016 she was awarded a $5000 grant from the Arizona Commission on the Arts, which she intended to use to support four months of research into underpainting.

Bess helped to organize the Phoenix branch of Dr Sketchy's Anti-Art School, and writes and illustrates a comic book titled Fighting Death Through Reanimation.

Bess was represented by Perihelion Arts in downtown Phoenix, prior to representation by the Lisa Sette Gallery in Phoenix.

She is an expert in rearing urban chickens and has published a handbook on the subject, Fowl Play.

== Notable exhibitions ==
Selected solo shows

2015. Phoenix Art Museum, Phoenix, Arizona

2014. Lisa Sette Gallery, Scottsdale, Arizona

2012. Lisa Sette Gallery, Scottsdale, Arizona

2011. Perihelion Arts, Phoenix, Arizona

2010

- Copro Gallery, Los Angeles, California
- Perihelion Arts, Phoenix, Arizona
- Rodger LaPelle Gallery, Philadelphia, Pennsylvania

2009.

- Copro Gallery, Los Angeles, California
- Perihelion Arts, Phoenix, Arizona

2008. Cattle Track Arts Compound, Scottsdale, Arizona

2007. Trinity Gallery, Philadelphia, Pennsylvania. May.

2006. Modified Arts, Phoenix, Arizona. November–December.

2005. Casa Grande Museum of Art, Casa Grande, Arizona. January–February.
