= Stephen A. Douglas High School =

High school in Philadelphia

Coordinates: 39.9764°N 75.1169°W

- 2700 E. Huntingdon St, Philadelphia, Pennsylvania; United States

Information
- Type: Public high school
- Closed: 2013
- Grades: 9–12
- Enrollment: 268
- Website: Roxborough High School

The Stephen A. Douglas High School was a district-run high school servicing the Fishtown, Port Richmond and Kensington areas of Philadelphia.

The school was closed in 2013 as part of Philadelphia's shutdown of 23 district-run schools. Displaced students were enrolled in Penn Treaty, Kensington International Business High School, Kensington Health Sciences Academy, Kensington Urban Education Academy.
