= Bess Bukodi =

Sociologist

Erzsebet "Bess" Bukodi is an associate professor in Quantitative Social Policy at the Department of Social Policy and Intervention, University of Oxford and a professorial fellow in sociology at Nuffield College, University of Oxford. She is a specialist in the role of education in social mobility.

== History ==
Bukodi received her M.A. in Economics and Sociology (1992) and PhD in sociology (2002) from Budapest University of Technology and Economics.

She was a Max Weber Fellow of the European University Institute 2006–2007.

Bukodi is a member of the British Sociological Association, the ISA Research Committee 28 on Social Stratification and Mobility, and the Hungarian Sociological Association. She is a member of the editorial board of Work, Employment and Society and a reviewer for the European Sociological Review and American Sociological Review.
