= Douglass Center =

American historic site in Florida

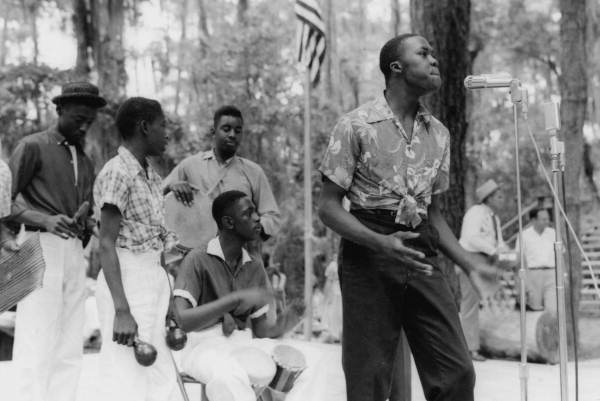
Douglas High School students performing at the Florida Folk Festival in White Springs, Florida

The Douglass Center, formerly Douglas High School is a historic site in Live Oak, Florida where a high school for African Americans was established. In the 1950s, students from the school performed at the Florida Folklife Festival in White Springs, Florida. The high school closed in 1969. In 2018 a historical marker was unveiled at the site.
