= Frederick Douglass Square Historic District =

Historic district in Massachusetts, United States

- U.S. National Register of Historic Places
- U.S. Historic district
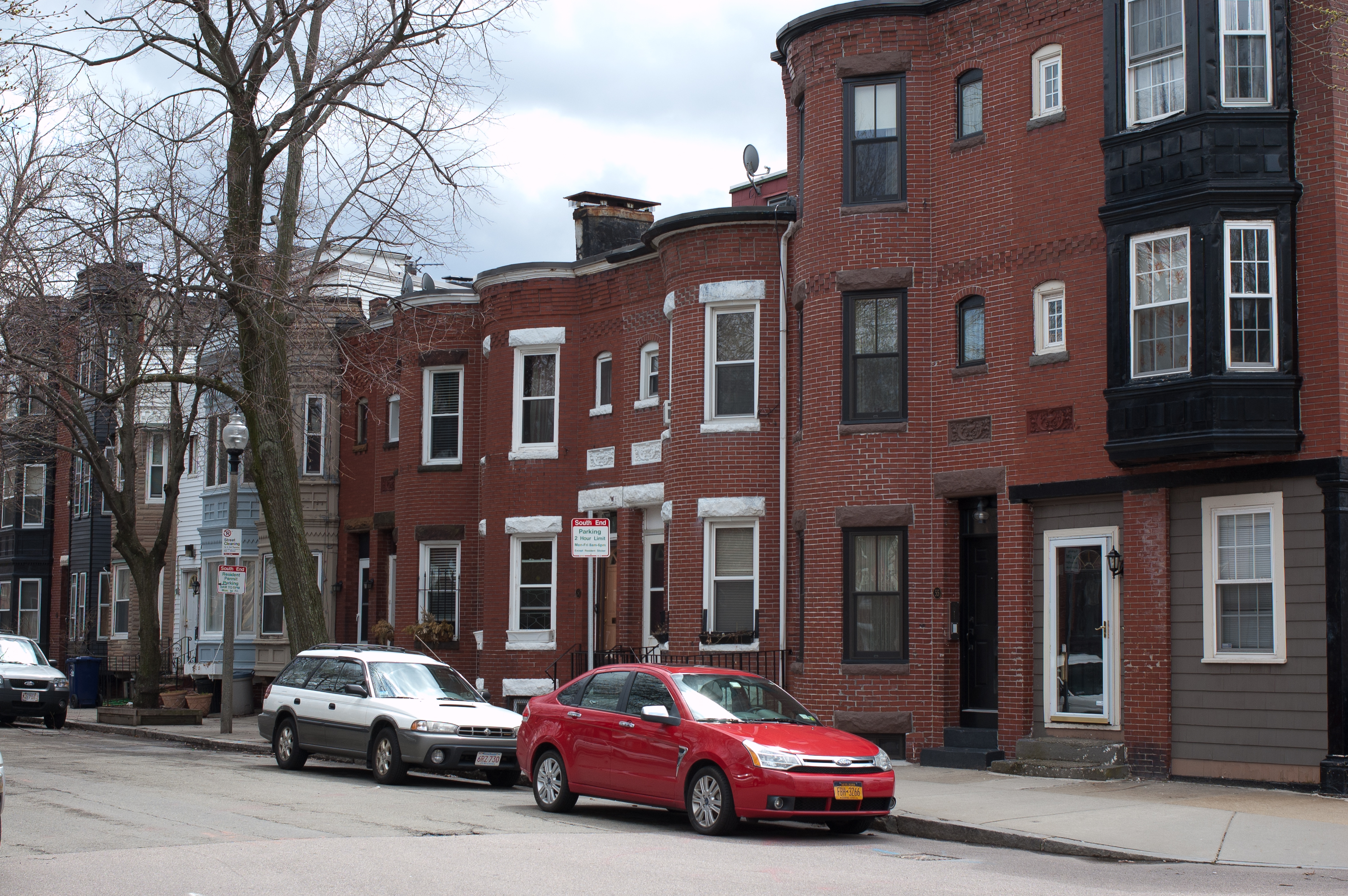

- Location within Boston Location within Massachusetts Location within the United States
- Location: Boston, Massachusetts
- Coordinates: 42°20′9″N 71°5′4″W
- Area: 5 acres (2.0 ha)
- Architect: Pope, George W.; Connolly, Benjamin J., et al.
- Architectural style: Second Empire, Queen Anne, Gothic
- NRHP reference No.: 96001063
- Added to NRHP: October 3, 1996

The Frederick Douglass Square Historic District is a historic district roughly bounded by Hammond Street, Cabot Street, Windsor Street, and Westminster Street, in the Lower Roxbury area of Boston, Massachusetts. It covers a 5-acre (2.0 ha) that is a remarkably well-preserved and cohesive residential development created as the result of one of Boston's many land-reclamation projects in the 19th century. This area, originally salt marshes that flooded at high tide, was at first gradually filled in as the Boston Neck was widened with the construction of Tremont Street and railroad lines. The Tremont Improvement Company acquired a remnant portion of the salt marshes by the early 1860s, and built a series of single-family row houses on the land that resulted from filling it in. The district includes most of the residential properties on Warwick, Greenwich, and Sussex Streets, as well as clusters of properties on adjacent streets.

The district was added to the National Register of Historic Places in 1996 and is a pending Boston Landmark. The nearby intersection of Tremont and Hammond streets was dedicated as Frederick Douglass Square in 1917, giving the district its name.

== See also ==
- National Register of Historic Places listings in southern Boston, Massachusetts
