= Bess Bonnier =

American jazz musician (1928–2011)

Bess Bonnier (born 26 May 1928 in Detroit; died 6 October 2011 in Grosse Pointe, Michigan) was an American jazz pianist, composer and music educator.

== Life and work ==
Bonnier, who was blind from birth, had classical piano lessons as a child. After graduating from Southeastern High School, she studied music and English at Wayne State University, but had to interrupt her studies to raise her three children as a single mother. In the 1960s, she earned a master's degree in English. She taught jazz piano for many years and performed at the Detroit Institute of Arts, at the Detroit International Jazz Festival and other local venues.

Bonnier presented a series of albums under her own name; in 1958 her debut album appeared on the Chicago label Argo. Her other albums include Suite William (1999), a jazz cantata with texts by William Shakespeare, and Bess Bonnier and Other Jazz Birds (1985), in which she played with guest musicians including Roland Hanna and Pepper Adams. In 1981 she performed with her longtime friends Tommy Flanagan, Barry Harris and Roland Hanna at the Detroit Piano Summit in a New York church.

In the 1960s she worked with the vibraphonist Jack Brokensha; their collaboration is documented on the album Xmazz, including their composition "Christmas Rag". She was also an Artist in Residence for many years, in addition to working as a music teacher at schools in the Detroit area.

== Discographic notes ==
- Theme for the Tall One (Argo 1958)
- Love Notes (Rhino, 1988) mit Paul Keller, Cary Kocher, Pete Siers
