= Alf Beus =

Australian rules footballer

Personal information
- Full name: Alfonsus Alfred Beus
- Born: 2 May 1954
- Died: 23 December 2024 (aged 70)
- Original team: Springvale YCW
- Height: 191 cm (6 ft 3 in)
- Weight: 86 kg (190 lb)

Playing career^{1}
Years	Club	Games (Goals)
1974–1975	South Melbourne	6 (0)
- ^{1} Playing statistics correct to the end of 1975.

Alfonsus Alfred Beus (2 May 1954 – 23 December 2024) was an Australian rules footballer who played for the South Melbourne Football Club in the Victorian Football League (VFL).
