= Frederick Douglass Memorial Park =

Cemetery in Staten Island, New York

Coordinates: 40°33′49″N 74°08′06″W

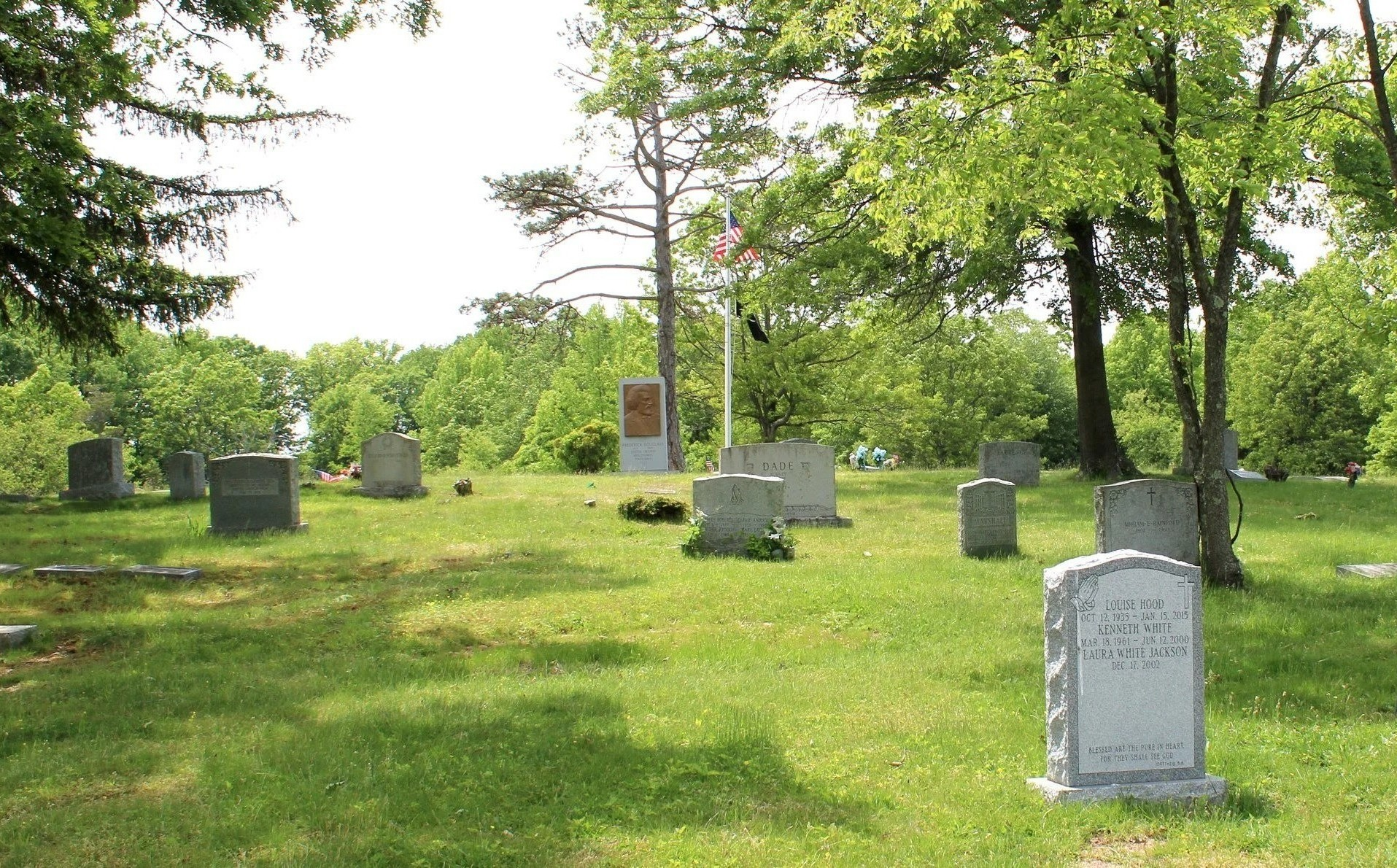
- Monument area near park entrance
- Interactive map of Frederick Douglass Memorial Park
- Type: Cemetery
- Location: 3201 Amboy Road, Staten Island, NY, 10306
- Established: 1935
- Operator: Frederick Douglass Memorial Park, Inc.
- Open: 9:00 a.m. to 3:00 p.m.
- Website: FDMP official site

New York City Landmark
- Designated: June 18, 2024
- Reference no.: 2682

Frederick Douglass Memorial Park is a historic cemetery at 3201 Amboy Road in the Oakwood Heights neighborhood of Staten Island, New York. The cemetery corporation was formed in 1933, and the first interments took place in 1935. It was established by and for Black New Yorkers during an era when many cemeteries practiced segregation, including the use of separate entrances and less-desired sections for African-American burials. The cemetery is named for the abolitionist and statesman Frederick Douglass (1818–1895).

The Landmarks Preservation Commission describes Frederick Douglass Memorial Park as the only extant, non-sectarian cemetery in New York City founded by and for African Americans. Estimates by preservation organizations and local media place the total number of interments at about 60,000. On June 18, 2024, the cemetery was designated an individual New York City Landmark.

== History ==
Early publicity in 1935 described the project as a “53-acre” cemetery, but deed records cited by the Landmarks Preservation Commission show the corporation purchased a 14.88-acre tract adjoining Ocean View Cemetery; the cemetery opened later that year.

The venture was led by Rodney Dade (1874–1956), a Harlem undertaker who operated a funeral home at 2332 Seventh Avenue and who, after graduating from Howard University’s medical college, briefly practiced medicine before entering mortuary work. Contemporary accounts recorded Dade’s objections to discriminatory practices at other cemeteries, including being directed to side entrances and offered inferior plots for Black clients.

Dade partnered with Frederick A. Bunn (1875–1942), an attorney and president of Ocean View Cemetery, who had earlier developed sections there known as Valhalla Memorial Park and Mount Sinai Memorial Park; an obituary described Bunn as an “expert in cemetery law and design,” and he served as the new cemetery’s first board president. Benjamin Diamond (c. 1890–1957), an administrator and business consultant and a founder of Harlem’s Daily Citizen, assisted Dade in forming the cemetery’s stock corporation (later referenced as Fre-Dou).

The board recruited prominent Harlem clergy and funeral directors, including Adam Clayton Powell Sr. of Abyssinian Baptist Church. A contemporaneous newspaper characterized the inaugural directors as “public-spirited men who sensed the growing need of just such an artistic development.”

The Frederick Douglass Memorial Park was managed by African Americans and intended to provide an attractive option for African Americans excluded from segregated cemeteries and facing high burial costs in the vicinity of New York. The first burials at the cemetery were on Monday June 10, 1935. As of December 31st, 1935, there were 117 interments in the first six months.

Non-Title interments in New York City in the 1800s were largely set aside for Slaves, "Colored Orphans", "Others", and the abject poor. From 1935, when FDMP opened its gates and soon after established non-title grave sites, those interred would not be linked to a lower socio-economic status or impoverished, as was the practice throughout the City.

An impressive memorial to the park's namesake, Frederick Douglass, was dedicated on May 28, 1961, the park's 26th Anniversary. Sculptor, Angus McDougall (1906-1978) designed the commemorative bronze bas relief cenotaph, which is located prominently near the front entrance. The eight-foot tall granite memorial - on which the cenotaph is mounted - was fabricated by Wegenaar Monuments, Amboy Road, Staten Island. It was reportedly the first monument in New York City honoring the civil rights leader.

Until 2018, at the park's main gateway, once stood a majestic entrance assembly. The historic gate and fencing consisted of iron gates, large brick posts with ornamental caps, and sections of iron picket fence at both sides of the main entrance mounted on a low masonry wall (NYC LPC, photo p3). Through the generosity of the United Staten Island Veterans Organization (USIVO), the park received its first US flag and flagpole. On Veterans Day, 2021, the US flag was dedicated to the park in an official flag raising ceremony hosted by USIVO in the monument circle.

The New York City Landmarks Preservation Commission (LPC) considered granting landmark status to Frederick Douglass Memorial Park in early 2024. The park was designated June 18, 2024. In June 2025, Frederick Douglass Memorial Park hosted a ceremony where community members, the New York City Landmarks Preservation Commission, the New York Landmarks Preservation Foundation, and Staten Island elected officials celebrated the cemetery's 90th anniversary and the first year of its landmark status. That October, the LPC awarded a $35,000 grant to help pay for a roof replacement at Frederick Douglass Memorial Park.

Local historical organizations and the Staten Island Museum have begun digitizing burial ledgers to facilitate genealogical research.

== Design and features ==
Frederick Douglass Memorial Park encompasses approximately 15 acres in the Oakwood neighborhood of Staten Island, New York City. From its inception, it was designed as a landscaped "memorial park" cemetery. The cemetery's founders commissioned J. Wallace Higgins, a civil engineer and landscape architect, to design the grounds in a park-like layout featuring curving pathways, open lawns, and grave markers set flush with the earth. This approach, common in 20th-century cemetery design, emphasized natural beauty and ease of maintenance, allowing for unobstructed views and more efficient groundskeeping. The cemetery features gentle rolling hills and tended green spaces intended to provide a serene, dignified environment for visitors. An endowment for perpetual care was established early in the cemetery's history to support ongoing maintenance.

Near the entrance to Frederick Douglass Memorial Park stands the Frederick Douglass Memorial, a prominent feature of the cemetery. Installed in 1961, the monument consists of an eight-foot-tall granite slab with a bronze bas-relief portrait of Frederick Douglass. Designed by sculptor Angus McDougall, the monument serves as a cenotaph honoring Douglass.

Additional structures on the site include a small brick office building—later expanded in 1961—designed by Staten Island architect James Whitford. The cemetery is also framed by decorative wrought-iron entry gates, which were most recently replaced in 2018 as part of site-wide improvements.

The landscape, featuring mature trees and curving roads, has been maintained to reflect its original design. The park retains its original acreage and layout, now enriched by decades of vegetation growth, contributing to its historic and memorial character.

== Administration ==
Original administration (1935):

- President of the Board – Frederick A. Bunn
- Board members – Kenneth Duncan, vice-president; Rodney Dade, Secretary and Treasurer; James Beckett; W. C. Brown; William P. Hayes; William M. Kelley; A. Clayton Powell Sr.; Clarence C. Wright

Board of Directors:

- President – Brandon Stradford
- Treasurer – Pamela Marshall
- Secretary – Lynn Cuffee
- Board Members – Vasheena Brisbane, Tanya Jackson, Lisa Wallace and Lynelle Cross

== Notable people interred ==
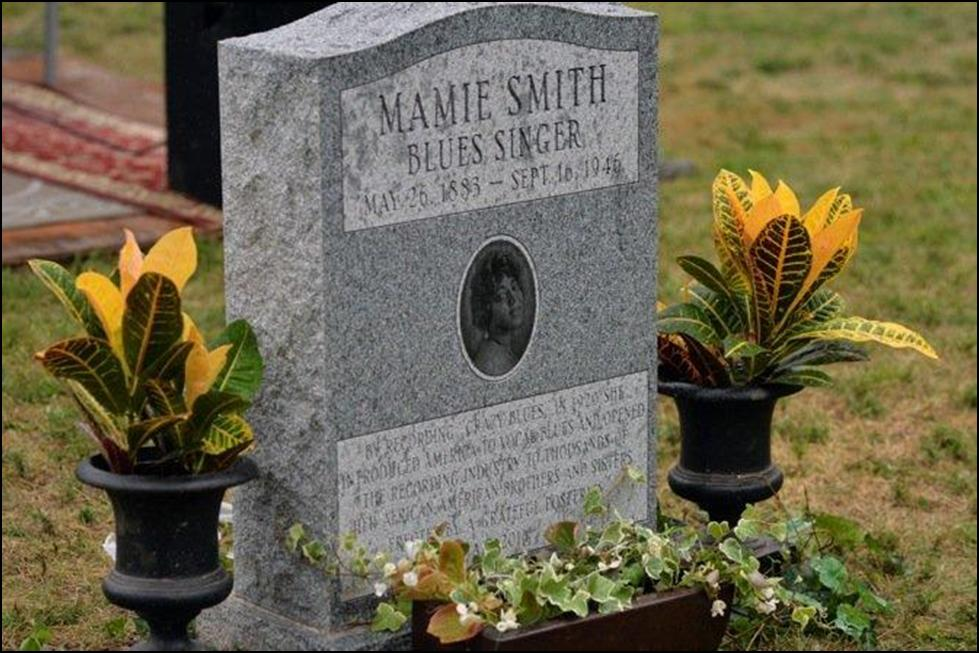
Gravestone of Mamie Smith

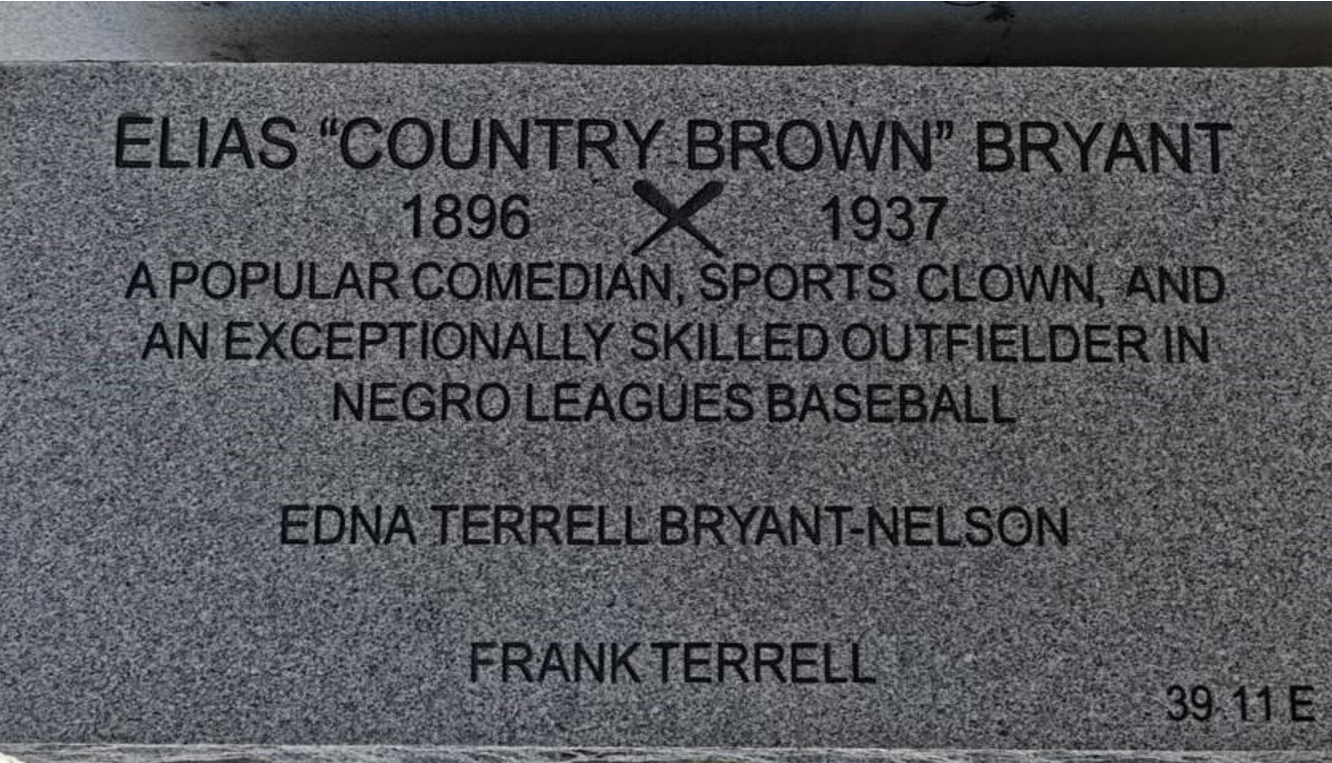
Gravestone of Elias "Country" Brown

- Mamie Smith, singer, dancer, pianist, and actress. Inducted in Blues Hall of Fame
- Elias "Country" Brown – Negro league All-Star baseball player
- Lillyn Brown, singer and entertainer
- Eleanor Bumpurs, elderly disabled woman shot to death by police in a confrontation during her eviction
- Nannie C. Burden (1891–1947) – singer and political candidate
- Floyd J. Calvin (1902–1939) – journalist and news service founder
- Tommy Ladnier, trumpeter
- Joseph E. Lymas (1883–1947) – world renowned violinist
- Rabbi Wentworth Arthur Matthew (1892–1973), Founder, Commandment Keepers Congregation
- Jimmy Mordecai, tap dancer
- Tom Doyed Overton (1889–1944)
- C. Luckeyth Roberts, pianist and composer
- Sol White, Negro League All-Star, Inductee into Major League Baseball Hall of Fame. Manager and Negro League Historian
- Rev. S. J. Worell
- Julia Pearl Hughes, businesswoman and women's club leader
- Rosa Henderson, singer and entertainer
- Charles "Mercury" Nelson, of the chart-topping R&B group Force MD's
- Joanna Berry Shields, Founder of Alpha Kappa Alpha sorority, the first African American sorority in the US

== Cultural significance and community role ==
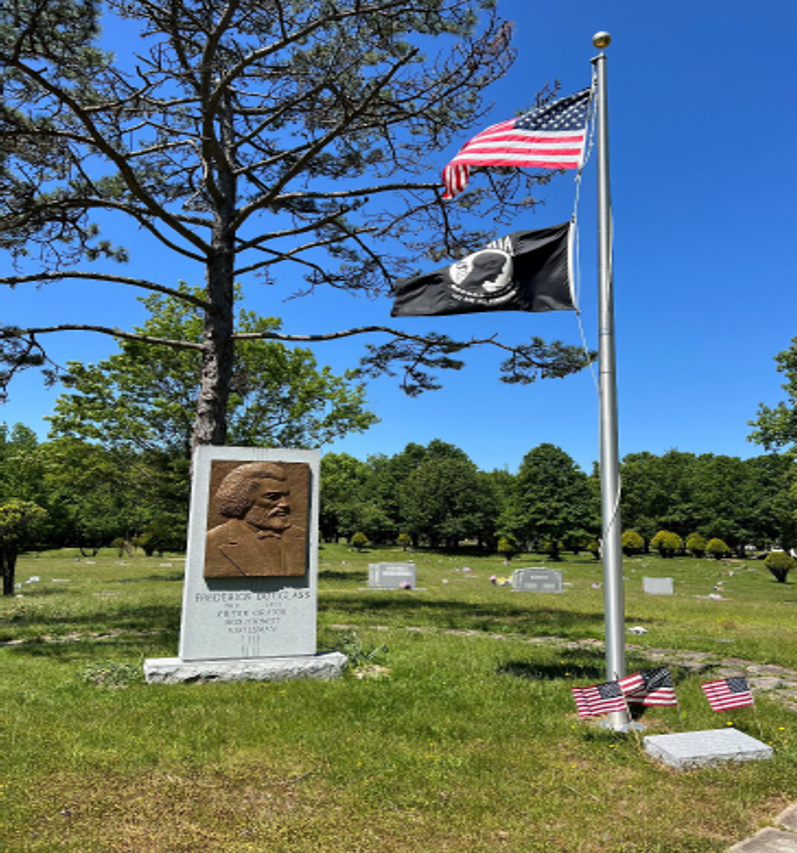
Cenotaph honoring Frederick Douglass

Frederick Douglass Memorial Park has been described by the New York City Landmarks Preservation Commission (LPC) as the only extant, non-sectarian cemetery in New York City that was founded by and for African Americans, created at a time when discrimination and segregation excluded Black New Yorkers from many burial grounds or confined them to inferior sections and services. City officials echoed this significance at the time of landmark designation in 2024, noting that the cemetery offered a dignified resting place when other cemeteries turned Black New Yorkers away.

Churches and community networks played a visible role in the cemetery’s use. Contemporary reporting documents that African-American congregations in New York purchased group plots for parishioners; for example, a pastor of Harlem’s Mount Moriah Baptist Church and church members were interred at Frederick Douglass Memorial Park, reflecting the cemetery’s integration into Black religious and civic life.

The site also serves as a place of public memory. In 1961 the cemetery installed a monument featuring a bronze relief of Frederick Douglass by Angus McDougall; LPC regards it as New York City’s first sculptural monument to Douglass. The cemetery’s landmark designation on June 18, 2024 further formalized its recognition for Black cultural history in the city. In June 2025, local officials and preservation groups marked the cemetery’s 90th anniversary and unveiled a commemorative plaque at the grounds.

Community stewardship has been a recurring theme in the cemetery’s recent history. Reporting in 2017 detailed long-standing maintenance and governance problems, court-appointed oversight in the 2000s, and the emergence of a volunteer group, Friends of Frederick Douglass Memorial Park, Inc., organized by plot owners and descendants to advocate for repairs and accountability. In the years that followed, preservation nonprofits, local institutions, and volunteers contributed to recovery efforts. The New York Landmarks Conservancy reported providing an emergency grant in 2020 to replace damaged portions of the cemetery office roof and a technical-assistance grant in 2023 for a conditions assessment.

Since 2022, the Access, Collaboration & Equity in Genealogy partnership—led by the Staten Island Museum with the Staten Island Afro-American Historical and Genealogical Society and the cemetery—has organized public transcribe-a-thons and ongoing volunteer work to digitize interment ledgers; the project notes support from The New York Community Trust.

The 2024 landmark designation drew coordinated public support: at LPC’s hearing, the cemetery’s board leaders, a local City Council member, and representatives of preservation groups testified in favor, and the Commission recorded letters backing designation from civic and community organizations including the Richmond County Black and Minority Chamber of Commerce, the Negro Leagues Baseball Grave Marker Project, the Commandment Pillar (Ethiopian Hebrew Congregation), and Alpha Kappa Alpha sorority; no opposition was recorded. Community partners have also supported commemoration: on June 22, 2025, the LPC, the New York Landmarks Preservation Foundation, local officials, and residents unveiled a plaque marking the cemetery’s 90th anniversary and the first year of landmark status.

== See also ==
- List of New York City Designated Landmarks in Staten Island
