= Douglass School (Bristol, Virginia) =

- U.S. National Register of Historic Places
- Virginia Landmarks Register
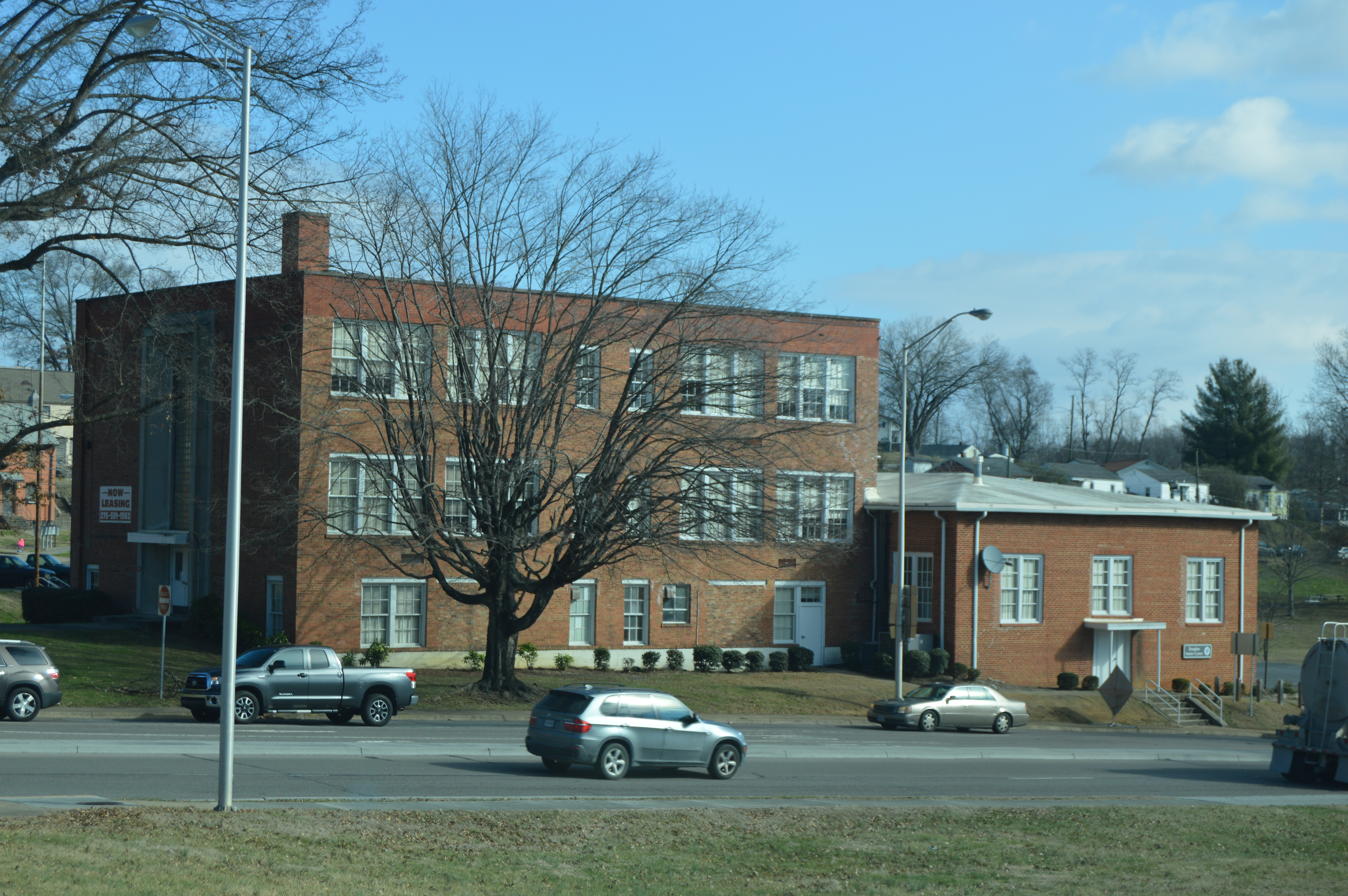
- Front of the school in 2017

- Location within Virginia Location within the United States
- Location: 711 Oakview Ave., Bristol, Virginia
- Coordinates: 36°36′33″N 82°10′31″W
- Area: 1.9 acres (0.77 ha)
- Built: 1921, c. 1929, 1963
- NRHP reference No.: 04001592
- VLR No.: 102-5021

Significant dates
- Added to NRHP: February 2, 2005
- Designated VLR: December 1, 2004

Douglass School is a historic school building for African-American children in Bristol, Virginia. The original section was built in 1921, with additions and alterations from about 1929 and 1963. It is a two-story, three-bay brick building with a flat roof.

It was listed on the National Register of Historic Places in 2005.
