= Douglass High School (Kingsport, Tennessee) =

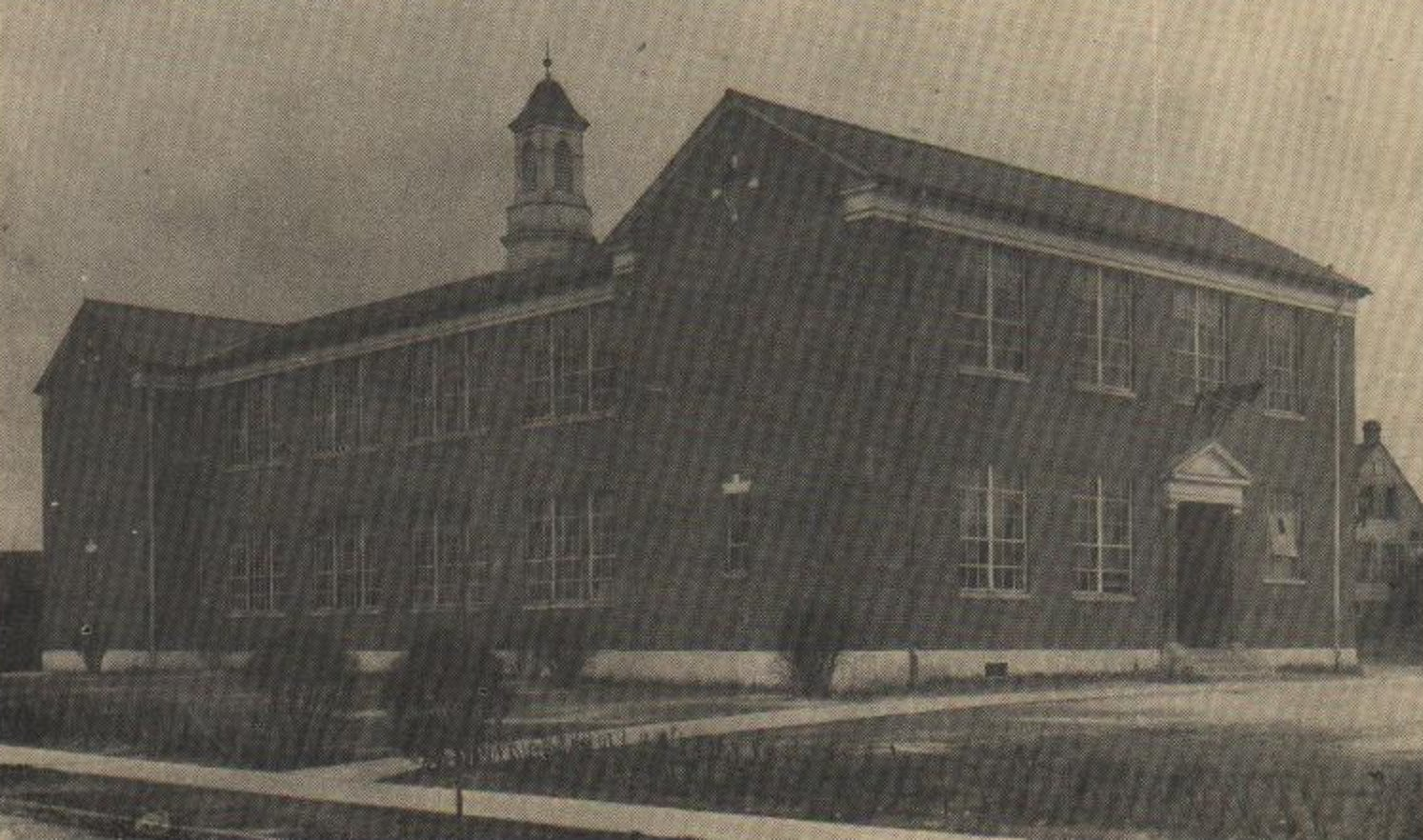
- The school in 1938

Location
- 301 Louis St; Kingsport, Sullivan County, Tennessee; United States; 36.5361°N 82.5535°W

Information
- Type: All-black public school
- Motto: V-I-C-T-O-R-Y
- Opened: 1913
- Status: Closed
- Closed: June 8, 1966
- School district: Sullivan County Schools
- Grades: 1-12
- Campus type: Urban
- Color: Blue
- Song: We are the Sons and Daughters of Douglass
- Sports: Basketball
- Team name: Tigers
- Accreditation: Southern Association of Secondary Schools and Colleges

Douglass High School was an African-American high school in Kingsport, Tennessee that closed in 1966. At the time, it was the largest African-American school in Upper East Tennessee, Southwest Virginia and Southeast Kentucky, and the largest between Knoxville, Tennessee and Roanoke, Virginia. It was named after the African-American statesman Frederick Douglass.

== Beginnings ==
Douglass High School, which included the elementary and junior high schools as well, was originally called the Oklahoma Grove School (also known as the Kingsport Colored School). It began in 1913 when the all-white Kingsport Public School moved to a new building and location, and its old building became the school for black children.

The first principal was Professor H. L. Moss, and he found the Oklahoma Grove School in bad shape. Parents requested the city build their children a new school. The Oklahoma Grove School later moved to Walnut and Myrtle Streets in Kingsport. It was in 1924, Albert Howell and his wife Ellen arrived from Tennessee A&I State College in Nashville to lead the school.

The rapid growth of the student body quickly outgrew the building and in 1924 another school building was built in the 700-block of Sullivan Street at Center Street. A contract was awarded in 1928 for a new school for African-American children. The school was to be named after Frederick Douglass, an orator, journalist and abolitionist during the anti-slavery movement of the 19th century, and was built at the corner of Center Street and East Sevier Avenue.

The school built in 1928 was a historic Rosenwald School, funded partially by the Rosenwald Foundation. Julius Rosenwald was an industrialist from Chicago, the first CEO of Sears, Roebuck and Company. He established a foundation to fund the construction of hundreds of school buildings for African-American children in the early 20th century, along with the Rosenwald Foundation, residents in the local African-American communities, and the local white school boards, to build the schools. In the case of the new Douglass School costing $54,325. public funds from the Kingsport School Board totaled $48,775, the local African-American community in the Riverview Subdivision put up $400, and the Rosenwald Foundation contributed $3,150. The school that was constructed was built to Rosenwald School standards.

In 1927, the school had already transitioned from an elementary school to a combination elementary-high school. It was during this time in 1931 that music teacher Bessie French wrote the official school song:

We are the Sons and Daughters of Douglass,

Most loyal and true.

We love our school colors,

The gold and the blue.

We love the task before us,

We always try to win.

V-I-C-T-O-R-Y,

Is the motto of Douglass High!

From 1924 to 1942, Doctor Howell helped Douglass High School become well known in most athletic circles. There was no budget for athletic equipment and uniforms, and the hand-me-down uniforms and equipment from Dobyns-Bennett High School soon became the property of the Douglass High School Tigers. Principal and football coach Doctor A.W. Howell, who was also the basketball coach, was known to dye the basketball uniforms in the school-supplied blue ink.

When Professor Howell resigned in 1942, Professor V. O. Dobbins, Senior, a Douglass science and math teacher, was appointed principal. Professor Dobbins started the free lunch program at Douglass School, feeding students with fruits and vegetables grown in his own backyard and canned by his sister and other neighborhood mothers in the Riverview-South Central Kingsport area.

The Douglass building still outgrew its surroundings, and in 1951, a new school building for black students was built, that still stands at 301 Louis Street in the Riverview Neighborhood in Kingsport today. The building was expanded in 1962, and within the walls of the combined elementary-high school, fiercely competitive sports teams were nurtured. The Douglass trophy case was a display of superiority in basketball and football. Top-notch marching bands and choruses also earned superior ratings, and Professor Dobbins and faculty were able to both entertain and educate the community through "Miss Douglass" competitions and various plays and pageants, funded mostly through the sale of sports concessions. The teachers fostered a togetherness that united each student with a sense of family, that was taught right along with the school subjects. Academically, Douglass gained accreditation from the Southern Association of Secondary Schools and Colleges, assuring its graduating seniors that their educations would further them at quality universities.

== Closure ==
Douglass Elementary-High School closed its doors and ceased operations on June 8, 1966, making it one of the last all-black schools in the area to close. The students who had not graduated yet, were all assimilated into the all-white schools of Kingsport, and the Douglass High School Alumni Association was formed to remind and lead school graduates and former students of the "Tiger Spirit" that forever binds them with their African-American heritage in Kingsport, and a reminder that the school's rich tradition and neighborhood pride are to be passed on to future generations.

Over the years, the school building itself at 301 Louis Street in the Riverview has never left its mission of being a sanctuary for the education of children. When the school closed in 1966, the government's Head Start Program immediately moved in and took over some of the classrooms, and to this day, Head Start pre-school students receive basic education that prepares them for entry into elementary school. Later, Kingsport Parks and Recreation took over operations of the sports facilities of the building, along with the Upper East Tennessee Human Resources Agency, a non-profit organization that provides public assistance to low-income residents.

== Notable faculty and alumni ==
- H. L. Moss – Principal 1913-1924
- Albert Howell - Principal 1924-1942
- V. O. Dobbins – Principal 1942-1966

== Future ==
The old Douglass High School building (now the V.O. Dobbins Sr. Complex) has been renovated and remodeled into Kingsport's non-profit center, an idea borne from Kingsport Mayors Dennis Phillips and Jeanette Blazer, to gather all of the city's non-profit agencies under one roof. The total cost of the project is $8.4 million, and the list of non-profit agencies with offices in the building are:

- The Sons and Daughters of Douglass Alumni Association, Inc. (a non-profit 501 (c) 3 Tennessee corporation)
- The United Way of Greater Kingsport
- The American Legion
- Upper East Tennessee Human Development Agency (UETHDA) and its Neighborhood Service Center
- Big Brothers/Big Sisters
- Local ALS chapter
- The Palmer Center
- Mountain Region Speech and Hearing
- Kingsport Parks and Recreation Office

The non-profit agencies are housed in a 3-story tower. The Douglass Alumni Association offices and Community Room also house the Carver Resource Center, that replaces the former Carver Library, the only branch of the Kingsport Public Library. Kingsport Parks and Recreation is in charge of a new gymnasium built alongside the old school gym. The Upper East Tennessee Human Development Agency's Kingsport Headstart program has the largest child enrolment in the 13 counties in the Upper East Tennessee district, and has classroom space in the building.

As stewards of the new building, the non-profit Sons and Daughters of Douglass Alumni Association is headquartered in the building for meetings, and operations of its "Sons and Daughters of Douglass" website. The website serves as a news outlet for the nearby Riverview neighborhood and the local community, while remembering and commemorating the heritage of the largest African-American school in upper East Tennessee and Southwest Virginia.
