= Douglass High School (Sherman, Texas) =

School in Texas, United States

Coordinates: 33.6455°N 96.6065°W

Fred Douglass High School was a public high school for African American students in the city of Sherman, in Grayson County, Texas.

== History ==
The school was named for African American abolitionist Frederick Douglass (1818–1895).

In 1964, the Fred Douglass Panthers football team won a state championship.

Some graduates attended Grayson College. An image of the school can be found in The Portal of Texas History from the University of North Texas.

== See also ==
- Douglass High School in Smithville, Texas
- Fred Douglas High School in Denton, Texas
- Fred Douglass High School in Jacksonville, Texas
- Rincon School (or Douglass School) in San Antonio, Texas
- Smithville Colored School in Silver Spring, Maryland
