= Curllsville, Pennsylvania =

Unincorporated community in Pennsylvania, US

- Unincorporated community
- Location within Pennsylvania Location within the United States
- Coordinates: 41°05′55″N 79°26′48″W
- Country: United States
- State: Pennsylvania
- County: Clarion
- Township: Monroe
- Elevation: 1,211 ft (369 m)
- Time zone: UTC-5 (Eastern (EST))
  - Summer (DST): UTC-4 (EDT)
- ZIP code: 16221
- Area code: 814
- GNIS feature ID: 1172841

Curllsville is an unincorporated community in Clarion County, Pennsylvania, United States. The community is 2.4 miles (3.9 km) east-southeast of Sligo. Curllsville has a post office with ZIP code 16221.
