= Frederick Douglass School (Key West) =

Defunct school in Florida, United States

Coordinates: 24.5500°N 81.8017°W

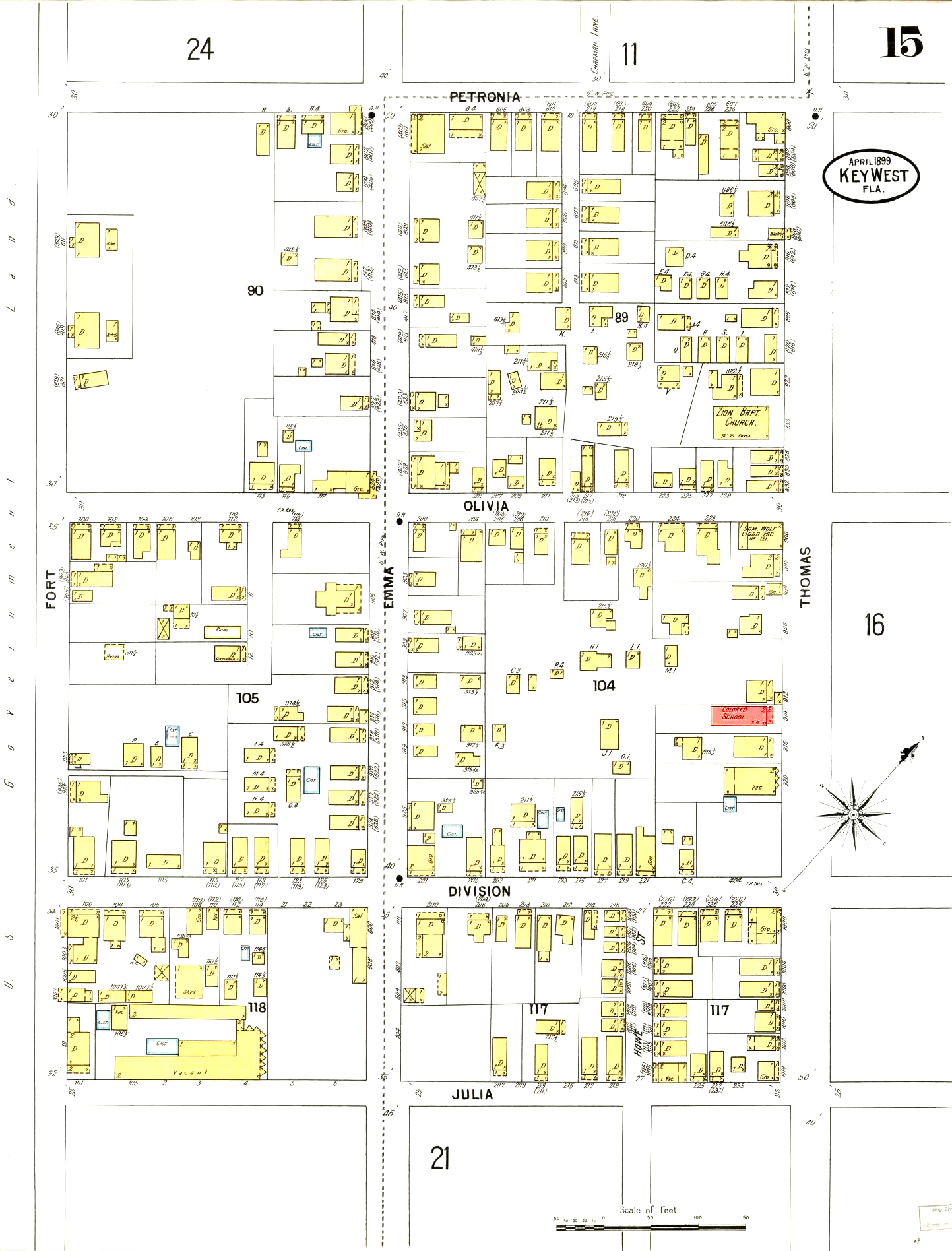
Frederick Douglass school in a Sanborn fire map for Key West, Florida

Frederick Douglass School was a school for African American children in Key West's Bahama Village neighborhood. It opened in 1870. William Middleton Artrell (died 1903), who also served on Key West's city council in 1875 and 1876, headed the school. He was a temperance advocate. He also worked at Stanton Institute in Jacksonville.

The school was expanded with buildings for Douglass Jr. High School and Douglass High School. Prior to the high school being built in the 1920s, African American students had to travel outside Key West for educational opportunities beyond the 8th grade.

Mildred Shaver was the school's principal in the early 20th century.

What is now the College of the Florida Keys held its first classes when it opened in 1965 at the former Douglass High School building.
