= Douglass High School (Leesburg, Virginia) =

Historic building in Virginia, US

- U.S. National Register of Historic Places
- Virginia Landmarks Register
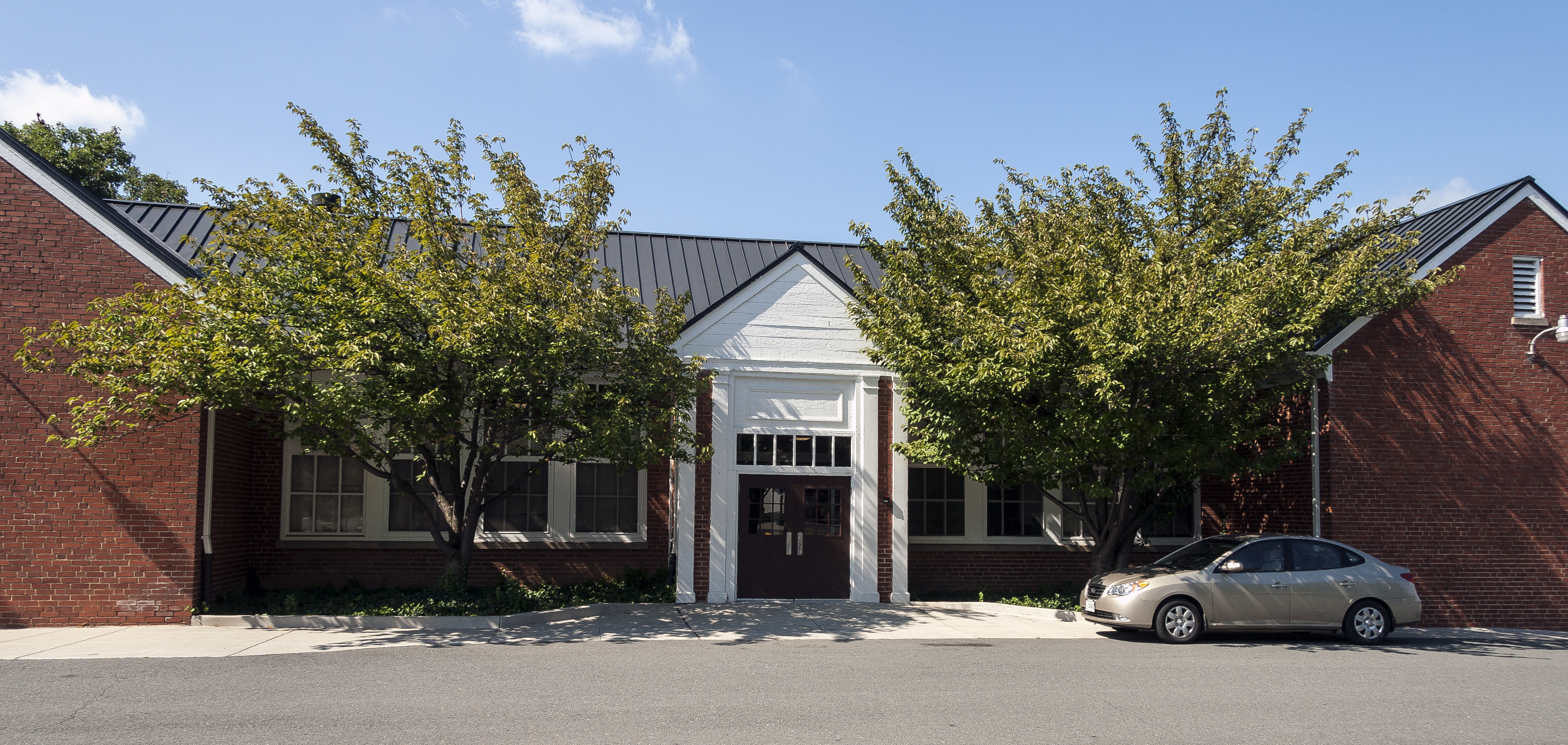
- Douglass High School, August 2008

- Location within Northern Virginia Location within Virginia Location within the United States
- Location: 407 E. Market St., Leesburg, Virginia
- Coordinates: 39°06′34.6″N 77°33′17.47″W
- Area: 9.9 acres (4.0 ha)
- Built: 1941
- Built by: Taylor Manufacturing Co.
- Architectural style: Colonial Revival
- Website: www.lcps.org/douglass
- NRHP reference No.: 92001274
- VLR No.: 253-0070

Significant dates
- Added to NRHP: September 24, 1992
- Designated VLR: October 8, 1991

Douglass High School or Douglass Alternate school was built in 1941 in what was then a rural area just outside Leesburg, Virginia, as the first high school for African-American students in Loudoun County. The school was built on land purchased by the black community for $4,000 and conveyed to the county for $1. It was the only high school for African-American students until the end of segregation in Loudoun County in 1968.

== Description ==
Douglass High School is a one-story brick building, originally of 9,400 square feet (870 m^{2}). The plan is centered on a commons area that functioned as a gymnasium, cafeteria and auditorium, flanked by two classrooms on either side. Large windows light and ventilate the spaces. A large stage area is directly opposite the main entrance, which opens directly into the commons area from a vestibule. Classrooms were added on the rear of the building, followed by a gymnasium in 1960. A vocational wing lies to the west.

== History ==
Until 1941, the only secondary educational facility available to African-American students in Loudoun County was the upper level of the Loudoun County Training School. The frame structure offered a limited curriculum in an unsafe building. During the late 1930s the black community in Loudoun County organized fundraiser events to purchase 8 acres (3.2 ha) of land on the east side of Leesburg from W.S. Gibbons. The property was conveyed to Loudoun County for $1 on December 16, 1940. After threats of legal action, the school board approved a measure to borrow $30,000 from the State Literary Fund of Virginia to build the school. A bid from the Taylor Manufacturing Company of Farmville, Virginia was approved for $35,438. The school opened in September 1941. The school was named for African-American abolitionist Frederick Douglass at the request of the community organizers. Since a bare minimum of furnishings were provided by the county, more private donations were sought to more fully furnish the school. With desegregation in 1968 the building became a middle school, then a special education and alternative school.

Douglass High School was placed on the National Register of Historic Places on September 24, 1992.
