= Academies of Loudoun =

Magnet school part of LCPS in Leesburg, Virginia

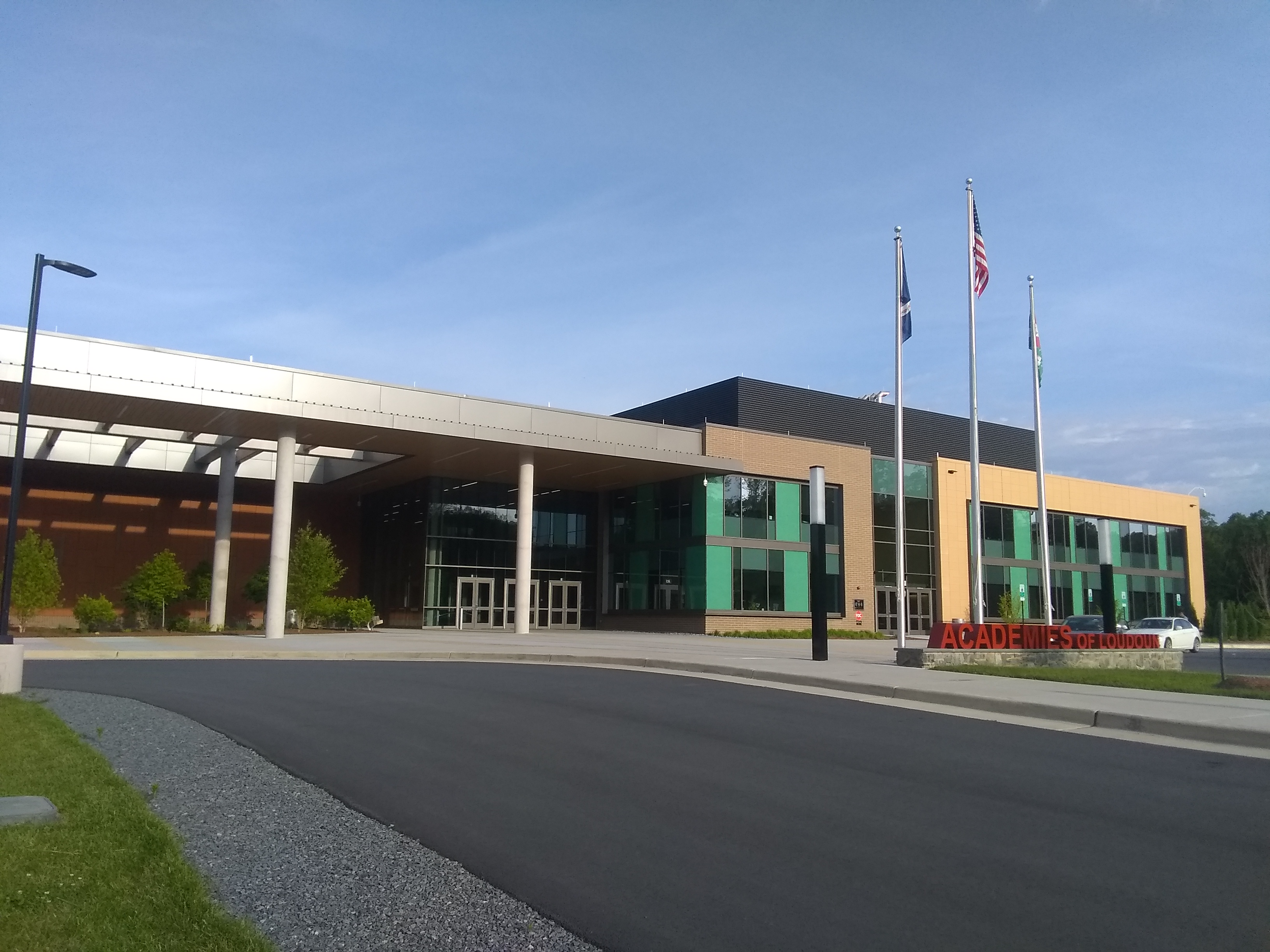

Location
- 42075 Loudoun Academy Dr; Leesburg, Virginia 20175; 39.042637°N 77.550348°W

Information
- Type: Magnet school
- Motto: Explore, Research, Collaborate, Innovate
- Founded: 2018
- School district: Loudoun County Public Schools
- Principal: Ryan Sackett
- Grades: 9–12
- Enrollment: 2,156 (2022-23)
- Colors: Blue, Green, and Teal
- Mascot: Raptor
- Website: www.lcps.org/o/acl

The Academies of Loudoun (ACL) is a magnet school in Leesburg, Virginia. It is part of Loudoun County Public Schools, and houses three schools with a focus on STEM education: The Academy of Engineering and Technology (AET), The Academy of Science (AOS), and the Monroe Advanced Technical Academy (MATA). Students enrolled in the Academies of Loudoun attend the Academies every other school day, spending the remaining days at their non-magnet high school, determined by attendance zones. The Academies is located on a 119-acre wooded campus, and cost $125 million.

== Programs ==
The Academies of Loudoun offer 3 programs to Loudoun County students: the Academy of Science, the Academy of Engineering and Technology, and the Monroe Advanced Technical Academy. The Academy of Science was the first to be founded in 2005.

=== Academy of Engineering and Technology (AET) ===
AET houses four subprograms, Engineering, IT, Entrepreneurship, and Advanced AET. Engineering and IT are intensive four year programs that require students to complete high level science and math coursework, and complete multiple research projects, culminating with an independent research project senior year. Entrepreneurship is a two year program, covering concepts related to marketing and running a business. Entrepreneurship students may matriculate into Advanced AET, which is a two year program (starting junior year), which is an abridged version of the Engineering or IT curriculum. The acceptance rate of AET was approximately 9% as 2020.

=== Academy of Science (AOS) ===
Much like AET students, student at AOS take a rigorous course-load of STEM classes. Students in AOS begin completing high-level research in sophomore year, and develop independent research projects in junior and senior year. The acceptance rate for AOS was approximately 4.3% as of 2025.

=== Monroe Advanced Technical Academy (MATA) ===
The Monroe Advanced Technical Academy gives students the opportunity to complete an education with hands-on elements by offering the following 1 year pathways:

- Administration of Justice
- Auto Collision Repair Technology
- Biotechnology
- Building Construction
- Certified Nurse Aide
- Cisco (DE)
- Culinary Arts
- Cybersecurity (DE)
- Emergency Medical Technician
- Environmental Plant Science (DE)
- Health Informatics
- Introduction to Health & Medical Sciences (DE)(10th grade only)
- Heating, Ventilation, and Air Conditioning
- Masonry
- Television Production and Digital Moviemaking
- Veterinary Science

and the following two year pathways:

- Auto Service Technology
- Biomedical Technology (DE)
- Computer Integrated Engineering and Design
- Computer and Digital Animation
- Cosmetology
- Graphic Communications
- Medical Laboratory Technology (DE)
- Pharmacy Technology
- Radiology Technology (DE)
- Welding (DE)

== History ==
The Academies of Loudoun opened in the 2018–2019 school year. This brought the three pre-existing schools under the same roof. The Academy of Science was relocated from Dominion High School, the Academy of Engineering and Technology was relocated from Tuscarora High School (Virginia), and the Monroe Advanced Technical Academy was rebranded from the C. S. Monroe Technology Center, known as Monroe Tech, and relocated from its building in Leesburg.

=== 2019 admissions controversy ===
In 2019, the Loudoun NAACP filed a complaint that alleged African American students were denied opportunity to attend the Academies of Loudoun, based on their racial background. The Attorney General's office subsequently launched an investigation, and Virginia officials found that the Academies of Loudoun's admissions policies prevented qualified black and Hispanic students from being accepted. The Academies of Loudoun has since reviewed and modified their admission policies.

=== 2024 fire ===
On Tuesday, September 17, 2024, a structure fire started in the welding workshop at the Academies of Loudoun. Fire-rescue crews were called at approximately 1 pm when a pull-station was activated, with the school resource officer reporting heavy smoke in the boiler room less than a minute later. All students and faculty were evacuated safely. Arriving units determined that the fire was located towards the rear of the building, inside of the welding classroom's fume extraction system. Crews worked for about an hour to fully extinguish the fire. One firefighter and an adult civilian sustained minor injuries and were transported to area hospitals for treatment, with no further injuries reported. The fire alarm and sprinkler system were reported to have functioned as designed. The Loudoun County Fire and Rescue Fire Marshal's office determined that the fire had started due to debris or a spark accidentally entering the extraction system from students welding earlier that day. The fire caused an estimated $1 million in damages. The building was temporarily closed to students and staff the next day due to a strong odor remaining after the fire. The building was reopened to students the next week, six days after the fire on Monday, September 23.

=== 2025 firearm incident ===
On October 15, 2025, a 17-year-old minor was arrested after the School Resource Officer discovered a firearm and ammunition in the student's vehicle parked on school property. The SRO became aware of the situation while investigating a separate report regarding the student's condition and subsequently located the weapon during a vehicle search. No injuries or threats to the school were reported, and no lockdown or evacuation was necessary as the weapon remained secured in the vehicle throughout the incident. The student was charged with possession of a weapon on school property. Principal Ryan Sackett addressed the school community, noting that the incident was handled in accordance with School Board policies and the Student Rights and Responsibilities document.

== Activities ==
=== Science fair ===
In 2025, Academies sent 5 students to the International Science and Engineering Fair.

=== Informatics tournament ===
The Academies of Loudoun Informatics Tournament (ACL-IT) is an annual competitive programming competition hosted by the Academies' Competitive Programming club.

=== Hackathon ===
ACL Hacks is an annual 24-hour coding event hosted by the Computer Science Honors Society.

=== Robotics team ===
ACL RoboLoCo, the Academies' robotics team, participates in the FIRST Robotics Competition annually. In 2022, 2023, and 2026 they qualified for the FIRST Championship, colloquially known as "Worlds".
