= John Cowne =

American football player (born 1962)

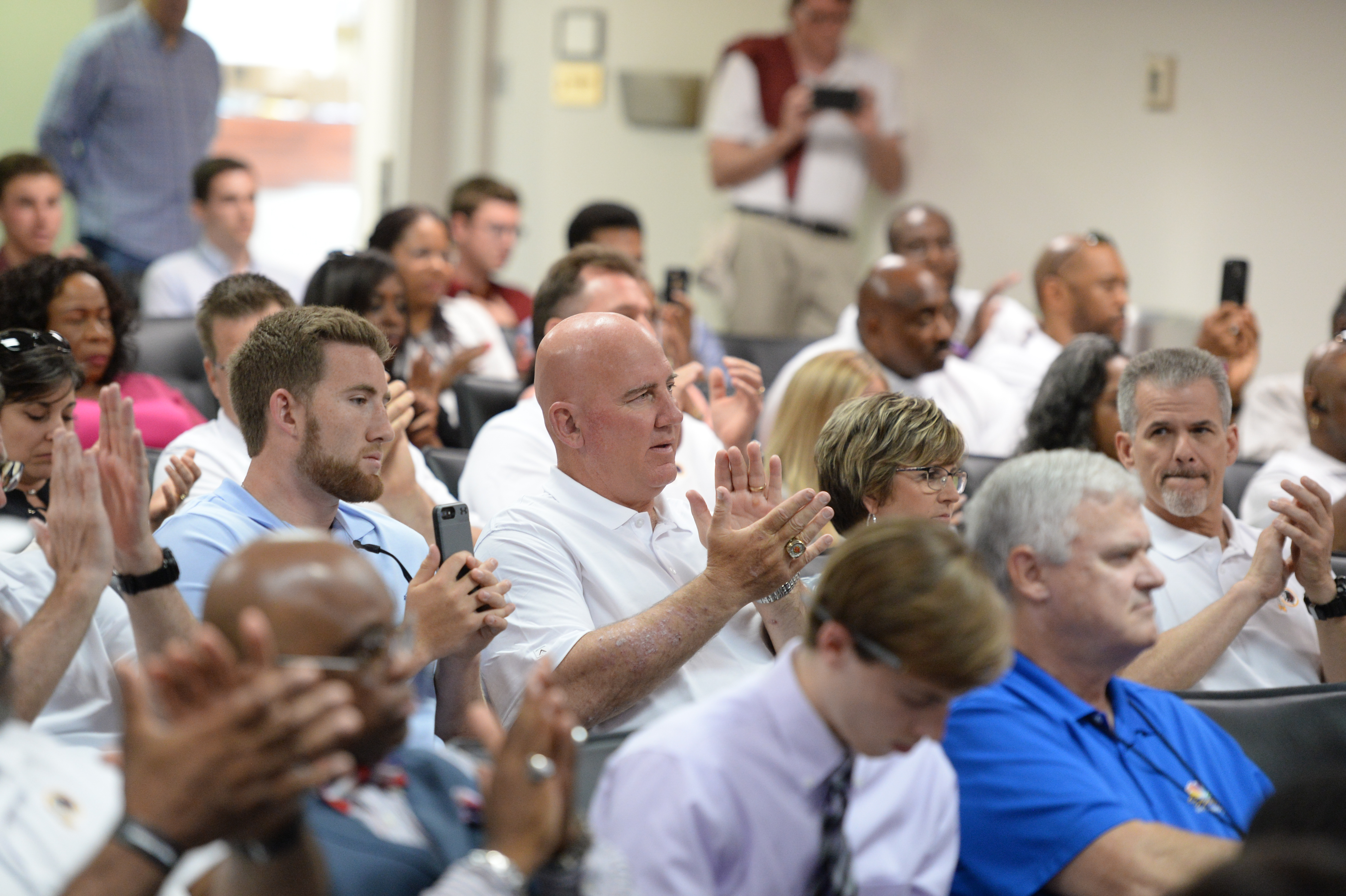
- Wooten (far right) at a Super Bowl ring ceremony held in 2018

No. 54
- Position: Center

Personal information
- Born: May 23, 1962 (age 64); Fairfax, Virginia, U.S.
- Listed height: 6 ft 2 in (1.88 m)
- Listed weight: 245 lb (111 kg)

Career information
- High school: Brentsville
- College: Virginia Tech
- NFL draft: 1984: undrafted

Career history
- San Diego Chargers (1987)*; Washington Redskins (1987)
- * Offseason or practice squad member only

Career NFL statistics
- Games played: 3
- Games started: 0
- Stats at Pro Football Reference

John Kendall Cowne (born May 23, 1962) is an American former professional football player who was a center for the Washington Redskins of the National Football League (NFL) in 1987. He played college football for the Virginia Tech Hokies.

== Career ==
He attended Brentsville District High School and played college football at Virginia Tech during the early 1980s.

Cowne briefly made it to the NFL with the Washington Redskins. He was on the team's roster in 1987, playing weeks four to six as one of the replacement players hired during the 1987 players' strike. Due to the playoff success of the Redskins after rosters were restored, Cowne and other replacement players received bonus checks for their contributions towards the Redskins win. Although a center, he was primarily a long snapper on special teams. Cowne was only the third Hokie to play for the Redskins when signed in 1987. He had previously gone to training camp for the 1987 season with the San Diego Chargers, before being waived at the end of preseason.

Cowne is currently employed by Loudoun County Public Schools, working at C.S. Monroe Technology Center. In addition to teaching, Cowne is a football coach at Woodgrove High School in Purcellville, Virginia. In 2011, his NFL jersey was added to the "Coaches Corner" Wall of Fame, a popular restaurant in Purcellville.

In March 2018, he received a Super Bowl ring at a ceremony in Redskins Park.
