= Jeff Lageman =

American football player and sports commentator (born 1967)

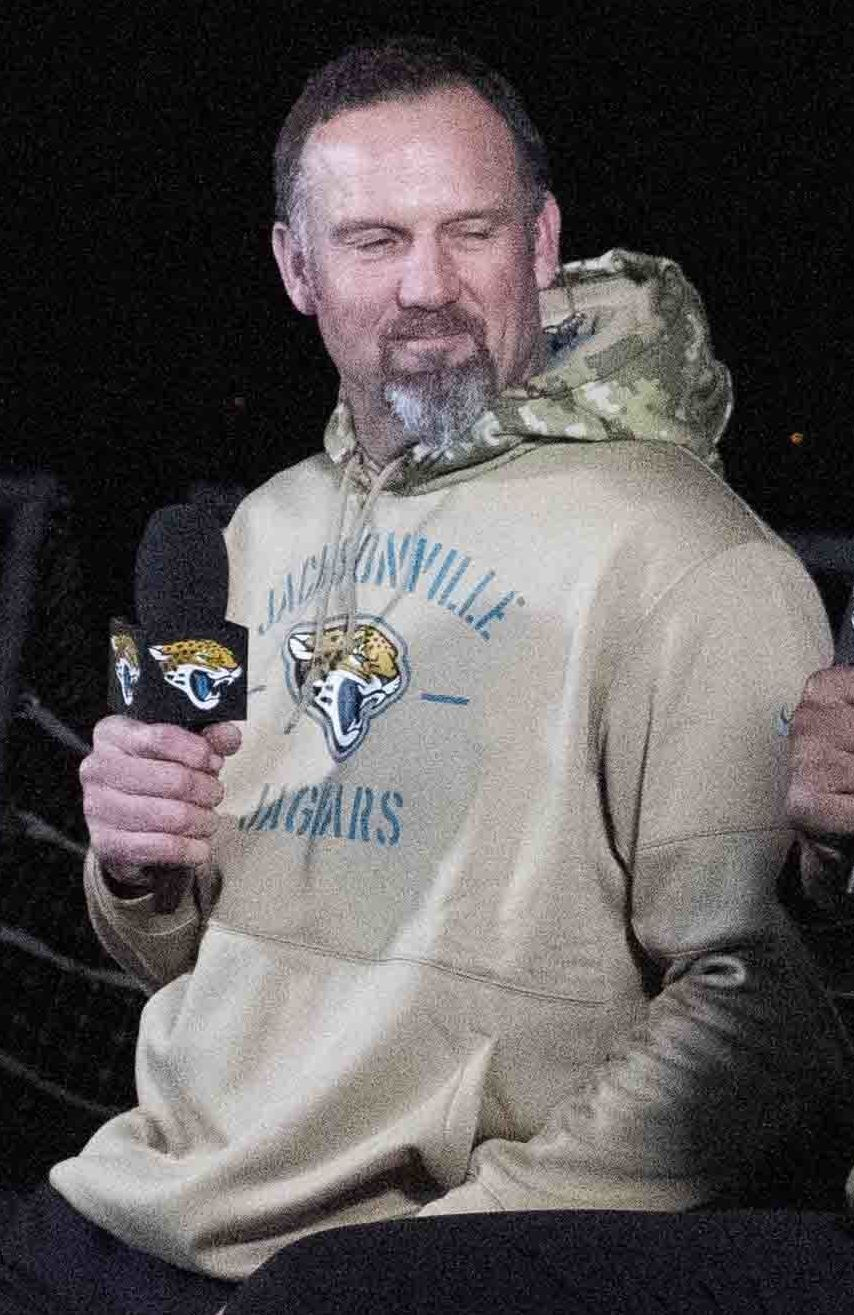
- Lageman aboard USS Paul Ignatius in 2019

No. 56
- Position: Defensive end

Personal information
- Born: July 18, 1967 (age 59); Fairfax, Virginia, U.S.
- Listed height: 6 ft 6 in (1.98 m)
- Listed weight: 266 lb (121 kg)

Career information
- High school: Park View (Sterling, Virginia)
- College: Virginia
- NFL draft: 1989: 1st round, 14th overall pick

Career history
- New York Jets (1989–1994); Jacksonville Jaguars (1995–1998)

Awards and highlights
- Second-team All-Pro (1991); PFWA All-Rookie Team (1989); First-team All-ACC (1988)

Career NFL statistics
- Tackles: 459
- Sacks: 47
- Forced fumbles: 11
- Stats at Pro Football Reference

Jeffrey David Lageman (born July 18, 1967) is an American sports commentator and former professional football player. He played as a defensive end in the National Football League (NFL).

Lageman played college football for the Virginia Cavaliers and was selected by the New York Jets in the first round of the 1989 NFL draft. In 1994, he was signed by the Jacksonville Jaguars; he retired after an injury in 1998. Though considered small for a defensive lineman, he distinguished himself on the field, recording a total of 47 career quarterback sacks. Following his retirement from sports he went into sports broadcasting in Jacksonville, Florida.

== Early life ==
Lageman was born in Fairfax, Virginia. He attended Park View High School in nearby Sterling. He attended the University of Virginia for college, where he played both linebacker and defensive end for the Virginia Cavaliers football team.

== Professional career ==
Pre-draft measurables
Height	Weight	40-yard dash	10-yard split	20-yard split	20-yard shuttle	Vertical jump	Broad jump	Bench press
6 ft 5 1/2 in (1.97 m)	247 lb (112 kg)	4.86 s	1.71 s	2.86 s	4.34 s	32.0 in (0.81 m)	9 ft 8 in (2.95 m)	15 reps
All values from NFL Combine

Although considered undersized to play defensive end in the NFL, a fact that was pointed out by Mel Kiper Jr. during ESPN's coverage of the 1989 NFL draft, Lageman was taken in the first round by the New York Jets. Lageman's NFL career spanned 10 seasons, the first six with the Jets, and the final four with the Jacksonville Jaguars. His best year came in 1991 when he made ten quarterback sacks. He made a career total of 47 sacks in the NFL.

In 1995, Lageman was signed by the Jacksonville Jaguars in their inaugural year. With Lageman playing a key role, the Jaguars made the 1996 playoffs and upset the Buffalo Bills and the Denver Broncos on the road before losing to the New England Patriots in the AFC Championship Game.

Lageman's playing career ended on the first game of the 1998 season in Chicago. Although the Jaguars won on a last second touchdown pass from Mark Brunell to Jimmy Smith, they lost Lageman to a torn muscle in his arm. He never played again.

== Retirement ==
During his time in Jacksonville, Lageman, an avid hunter and fisherman, began his broadcasting career with a radio show titled "The Outdoors Show" along with Captain Kevin Faver and Captain Kirk Waltz. After his playing career, Lageman continued his broadcasting career as a football color analyst on Fox television.

By 2001, "The Outdoors Show" had moved from an all-sports station (WBWL-AM) to a 50,000 watt news-talk station (WOKV) and soon after, Lageman joined the play-by-play man Brian Sexton in the booth of the Jaguars Radio Network as the color analyst. He also serves as co-host of the weekly "Jaguars This Week" radio show along with Sexton, Jaguars.com senior writer John Oehser and former Jaguars teammate Tony Boselli, and is a castmember of the weekly television program, Jaguars All Access. Lageman lives in Jacksonville with his wife, Tera Lageman, and their children Taylor and Dylan.
