= Miller Electric =

Company based out of Appleton, Wisconsin which manufactures welding equipment

- Type: Subsidiary
- Industry: Electronic
- Founded: 1929; 97 years ago
- Founder: Niels Miller
- Headquarters: Appleton, Wisconsin, U.S.
- Area served: United States
- Products: Electronic products
- Parent: Illinois Tool Works
- Website: millerwelds.com

Miller Electric is an American arc welding and cutting equipment manufacturing company based in Appleton, Wisconsin. Miller Electric has grown from a one-man operation selling products in northeastern Wisconsin to what is today one of the world's largest manufacturers of arc welding and cutting equipment.

== Overview ==
In 1929, Niels Miller designed a small arc welder for "stick welding" that could operate on the electrical supplies in rural Wisconsin that was lighter and less expensive than the DC rotary units previously available. The first machine was built from recycled scrap steel and coil windings in his basement.

In 1935, Miller Electric Mfg. Co. was incorporated. Al Mulder, Miller's sole engineer, invented the world's first high frequency-stabilized AC industrial welder, making AC welding practical for use in factories and construction.

Miller Electric developed the Millermatic in 1971, combining the previously separate units of power source and wire feed into one unit, bringing MIG welding within reach of a wider market.

In 1993, following the death of the company's heir, Miller Electric was purchased by Illinois Tool Works (ITW), a multi-national company based near Chicago.

The company regularly exhibits new products at trade fairs including SEMA.

== ITW ==
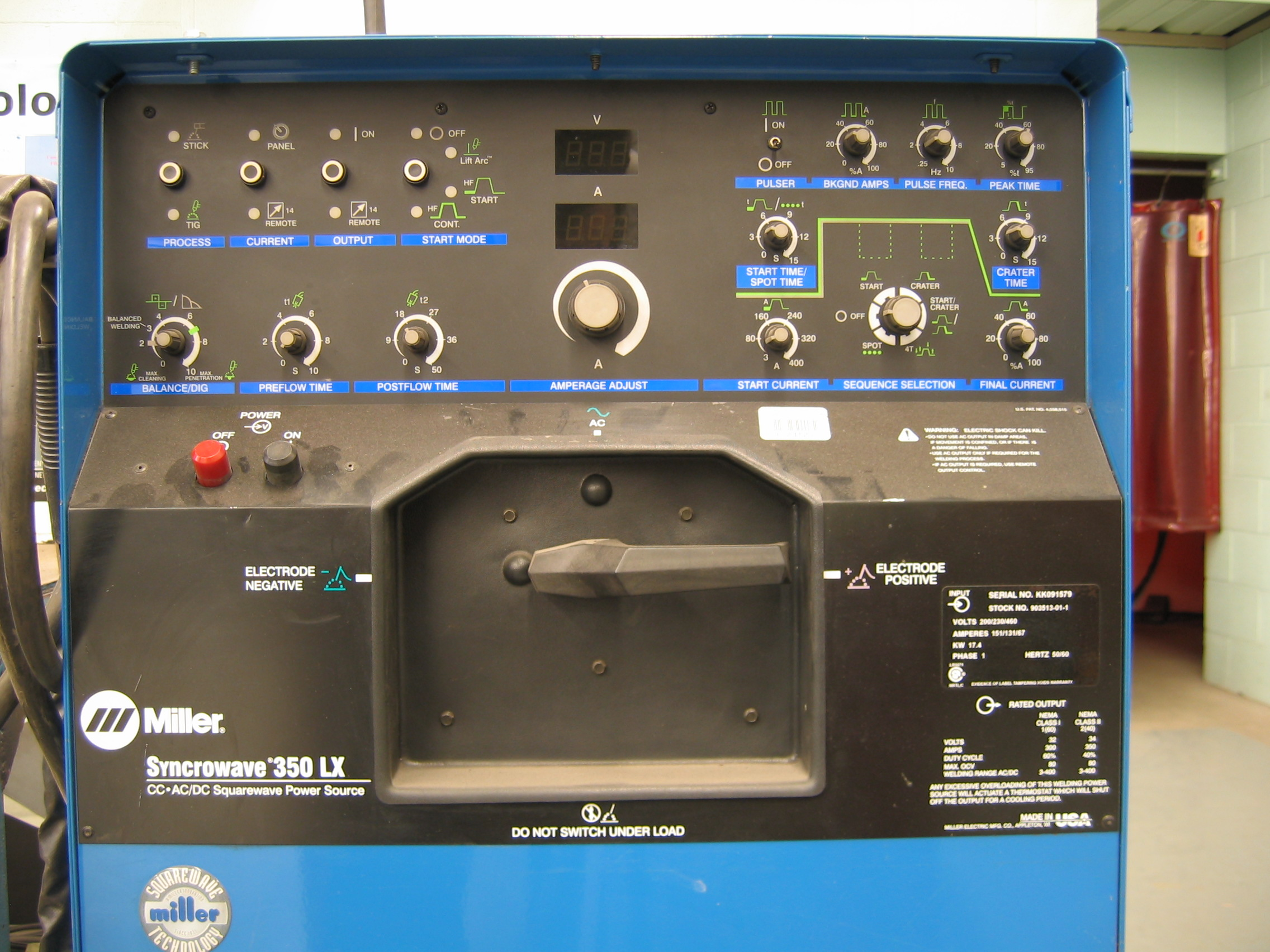
Miller Syncrowave 350LX power source

ITW had much in common with Miller Electric in terms of business philosophy, and in 1992 it was ranked as one of the 100 "Most Admired American Corporations" by Fortune magazine. ITW brought to Miller the resource base and global perspective needed to further strengthen the company's position as a world leader in the welding industry.

In 2002, it became the first U.S. welding equipment manufacturer to comply with the new ISO 9001:2000 standard.

== Products list ==
Miller electric manufactures a lot of products related to arc welding. Some of the important products they manufacture are listed below:

1. Welders
  - MIG(GMAW)
  - TIG(GTAW)
  - Stick(SMAW)
  - Engine Driven
2. Wire Feeders
3. Welding Intelligence
4. Welding safety equipment
  - Helmets
  - Weld Mask
  - Caps
  - Safety Glasses
  - Gloves
  - Apparel
  - Fume Extractors
  - Respiratory
