= Dominion High School =

Location
- 21326 Augusta Drive; Sterling, Virginia 20164; 39.0263°N 77.3735°W

Information
- School type: Public high school
- Motto: Always Be Truly Titan
- Founded: September 15, 2003; 22 years ago
- Locale: Suburban, Large
- School board: Loudoun County School Board
- School district: Loudoun County Public Schools
- NCES District ID: 5102250
- Superintendent: Dr. Aaron Spence
- NCES School ID: 510225002411
- Principal: W. John Brewer
- Teaching staff: 133.05 (on an FTE basis)
- Grades: 9–12
- Enrollment: 1,453 (2024–25)
- Student to teacher ratio: 10.92
- Language: English
- Colors: Black & silver
- Athletics conference: Dulles District; Region II
- Mascot: Titan
- Rivals: Potomac Falls High School; Park View High School
- Communities served: Lowes Island; Sugarland Run; Great Falls Forest
- Feeder schools: Horizon Elementary; Lowes Island Elementary; Meadowland Elementary; Sugarland Elementary; Seneca Ridge Middle School
- Website: www.lcps.org/o/dmh

Dominion High School is a public secondary school in Sterling, an unincorporated area in Loudoun County, Virginia, United States. Dominion High School first opened in 2003, receiving students from Seneca Ridge Middle School, Potomac Falls High School, and Park View High School. Dominion's student body lives primarily in the communities of Sugarland Run, Great Falls Forest, and Lowes Island.

== School ==
Dominion High School is a fully accredited high school based on the Standards of Learning tests in Virginia. For the 2023–2024 school year, Dominion's student body is 43% Hispanic, 33% White, 14% Asian, 6% Black, and 4% Other, American Indian, or two or more races.

In 2005, Dominion was the host of the Loudoun Academy of Science, a part-time magnet school program for Loudoun County students. In 2018, the Academy of Science moved out of Dominion and formed the Academies of Loudoun.

== Student life ==
The Dominion sports teams play in Conference 21 and Region 4A. The Titans girls' soccer team won the AAAA state championship in soccer in 2014. In 2016, the boys' lacrosse team won the state championship. In the spring of 2021, the Titans won three class 4 state championships.

In 2009, the school joined the Cappies Awards Program of the Northern Virginia/DC Metro Area.

DHS Press is the official Dominion news organization. In 2017, the PBS Student Reporting Labs partnered with Dominion, and in 2021, two students were listed on their "list of 20 up-and-coming journalists."

== Notable alumni ==
- Lauryn Hutchinson, footballer on the Trinidad and Tobago women's national football team, attended Virginia Commonwealth University
- Meggie Meidlinger, Class of 2006, women's national baseball player
- Paul Troth, quarterback at East Carolina, coach at John Champe High School
