= Saint Louis, Virginia =

Unincorporated community in Virginia, United States

- unincorporated community
- Location within Northern Virginia Location within Virginia Location within the United States
- Coordinates: 39°00′14″N 77°47′25″W
- Country: United States
- State: Virginia
- County: Loudoun
- Time zone: UTC−5 (Eastern (EST))
  - Summer (DST): UTC−4 (EDT)

Saint Louis is an unincorporated community in southwestern Loudoun County, Virginia, United States. Saint Louis is located near the intersection of Saint Louis Road (Virginia State Route 611) and Snake Hill Road (Virginia State Route 744), six miles west of Middleburg. It is a historic African American community dating from 1891 or earlier, with many African Americans still living there today. Banneker Elementary School is located in Saint Louis.
