= Sugarland Run, Virginia =

- Census-designated place
- Location within Northern Virginia Location within Virginia Location within the United States
- Coordinates: 39°02′15″N 77°22′31″W
- Country: United States
- State: Virginia
- County: Loudoun
- Incorporated: February 22, 1971
- Founder: Joseph M. Fries, Richard B. Abramson, Jack L. Lewis
- Named for: Sugarland Run

Government
  - Type: Board of Directors
  - Body: Sugarland Run Homeowners Association

Area
  - Total: 2.03 sq mi (5.26 km^{2})
  - Land: 2.01 sq mi (5.20 km^{2})
  - Water: 0.023 sq mi (0.06 km^{2})
- Elevation: 270 ft (82 m)

Population (2010)
  - Total: 11,799
  - Estimate (2020): 12,956
  - Density: 5,880/sq mi (2,269/km^{2})
- Time zone: UTC−5 (Eastern (EST))
  - Summer (DST): UTC−4 (EDT)
- ZIP code: 20164 (Sterling)
- FIPS code: 51-76464

Sugarland Run is a planned community and census-designated place in Loudoun County, Virginia, United States. The population at the 2010 census was 11,799. In 2020, it was estimated to be 12,956. Sugarland Run is part of the Washington metropolitan area and is 26 miles (42 km) by road northwest of Washington, D.C.

== Geography ==
Sugarland Run is in the eastern corner of Loudoun County, 2 miles (3 km) north of Virginia State Route 7 and 3 miles (5 km) south of the Potomac River. The community is named for Sugarland Run, a stream which flows toward the Potomac along the east side of the community.

According to the U.S. Census Bureau, the Sugarland CDP has a total area of 2.0 square miles (5.3 km^{2}), of which 0.02 square miles (0.06 km^{2}), or 1.12%, is water.

The CDP is connected by Virginia State Route 7 to Leesburg to the west and Reston, Tysons and Interstate 495 to the east. Nearby Virginia State Route 28 connects it to Sterling, Dulles International Airport, Dulles Town Center, Chantilly, Centreville and Manassas, all to the south. Virginia State Route 286 connects Sugarland Run to Reston and Herndon to the south and to Interstate 95 to the southeast. Virginia State Route 193 connects the CDP to Great Falls, Interstate 495 and McLean to the east.

== Demographics ==
Historical population
Census	Pop.	Note	%±
1980	6,258		—
1990	9,357		49.5%
2010	11,799		—
2020	12,345		4.6%
U.S. Decennial Census; 1950 1960 1970; 1980 1990 2000; 2010

Sugarland Run was listed as a census designated place in the 1980 U.S. census and the 1990 U.S. census. It did not appear in the 2000 U.S. census and was relisted in the 2010 U.S. census.

=== 2020 census ===
As of the 2020 census, Sugarland Run had a population of 12,345. The median age was 36.5 years. 24.4% of residents were under the age of 18 and 10.4% of residents were 65 years of age or older. For every 100 females there were 105.0 males, and for every 100 females age 18 and over there were 100.4 males age 18 and over.

100.0% of residents lived in urban areas, while 0.0% lived in rural areas.

There were 3,653 households in Sugarland Run, of which 42.6% had children under the age of 18 living in them. Of all households, 61.4% were married-couple households, 13.9% were households with a male householder and no spouse or partner present, and 19.6% were households with a female householder and no spouse or partner present. About 13.4% of all households were made up of individuals and 5.4% had someone living alone who was 65 years of age or older.

There were 3,723 housing units, of which 1.9% were vacant. The homeowner vacancy rate was 0.7% and the rental vacancy rate was 3.5%.

Racial composition as of the 2020 census
Race	Number	Percent
White	5,089	41.2%
Black or African American	895	7.2%
American Indian and Alaska Native	78	0.6%
Asian	1,891	15.3%
Native Hawaiian and Other Pacific Islander	8	0.1%
Some other race	2,591	21.0%
Two or more races	1,793	14.5%

== Education ==
=== Primary and secondary education ===
Students in Sugarland Run attend Loudoun County Public Schools. There are two elementary schools for the community, Sugarland Elementary and Meadowland Elementary. They are in Sugarland Run. Middle school students attend Seneca Ridge Middle School. High school students attend Dominion High School, which is the location of the county's gifted high school, Loudoun Academy of Science.

=== Tertiary education ===
Sugarland Run is 3 miles (5 km) northeast of the Northern Virginia Community College – Loudoun Campus (NVCC). It is also three miles northeast of George Mason Loudoun.

== Homeowners' associations ==
Sugarland Run has three homeowners' associations — Sugarland Run Homeowners' Association, Sugarland Square Homeowners' Association and Sugarland Run Townhouse Homeowners' Association. Community amenities include:

- Community center
- an Olympic-size pool
- a wading pool for tots
- two tennis courts (one with pickleball)
- basketball courts
- volleyball court
- multi-purpose field
- fishing lake
- 26 miles of paved wooded walking trails
- numerous playgrounds

Sugarland Run has four models of single-family homes (Balboa, Laguna, Malibu and Redondo). Some were built with garages, some had car ports. Owners have added garage/car ports and additions which adds variation to the style of the homes in the neighborhood. There are also townhouses (at least four models). These homes were built in the 1970s and 1980s. Most back to paved walking trails, woods or streams. In contrast to surrounding colonial-style neighborhoods, Sugarland Run homes are built in the California contemporary style with vaulted ceilings and modern exteriors.
