= Willard, Virginia =

- Unincorporated area
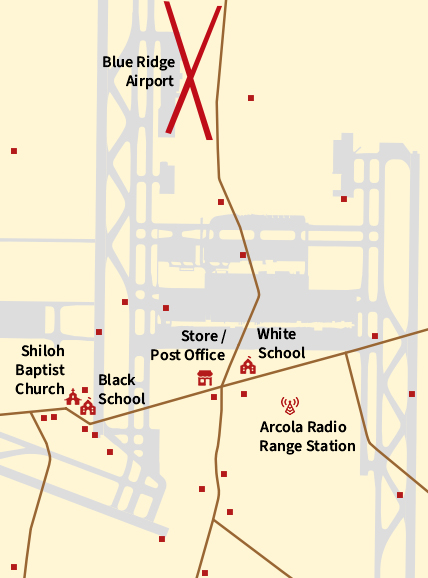
- Willard c. 1958 atop footprint of current runways and taxiways

- Location within the Commonwealth of Virginia Willard, Virginia (Virginia) Willard, Virginia (the United States)
- Coordinates: 38°56′25″N 77°27′2″W
- Country: United States
- State: Virginia
- County: Loudoun
- Time zone: UTC-5 (Eastern (EST))
  - Summer (DST): UTC-4 (EDT)

Willard (also known as Willard Crossroads) was an unincorporated community located in what is now a part of Dulles International Airport in the U.S. state of Virginia.

The village was named after Joseph Edward Willard, a delegate to the Virginia General Assembly from 1893 to 1901, then Lieutenant Governor of Virginia. Although Willard lived in Loudoun County, he represented Fairfax County, because the village was only 1,500 feet (460 meters) from the county border. Willard owned a 50-acre (20-hectare) estate in Fairfax. His father was Joseph Clapp Willard, the owner of the famed Willard Hotel in Washington, D.C.

Willard was at the intersection of Willard Road (now Stonecroft Boulevard) and the old Sterling Road. Willard was surrounded by extensive farmland, housing, schools, places of worship, the Willard store (until 1907), and Blue Ridge Airfield (1938–1951). Willard stood west of Floris, north of Pleasant Valley, and south of Farmwell (now Ashburn). Willard was regarded as a crossroads and a distinctive community until construction of Washington Dulles International Airport began in 1958.

Approximately 26 square miles (67 square kilometers) of Virginia land from Willard, Chantilly, Pleasant Valley, Sterling, and Ashburn was bought for construction. By the airport's completion, all remains of civilization before 1958 on this land had virtually disappeared, except a stretch of Willard Rd (used as a service road), and three storage outbuildings between Runways 1C/19C and 1R/19L.
