= Joint Forces Staff College =

Coordinates: 36°55′14″N 76°18′35″W

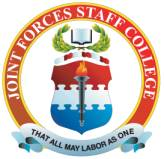
- Active: 1946–present
- Country: United States
- Branch: Joint
- Type: Staff college
- Part of: National Defense University
- Garrison/HQ: Naval Support Activity Hampton Roads; Norfolk, Virginia
- Motto: "That All May Labor as One"

Commanders
- Commandant: Maj Gen Thomas D. Crimmins, USAF

The Joint Forces Staff College (JFSC), located in Norfolk, Virginia, was established as the Armed Forces Staff College in 1946 and incorporated into the National Defense University in August 1981. It educates and acculturates joint and multinational warfighters to plan and lead at the operational level. Military operations increasingly require the Armed Services to work jointly, and JFSC provides students the tools to operate in a joint environment. JFSC is composed of three schools, each with different student populations and purposes.

== Mission ==
The mission of the Joint Forces Staff College, a component of the National Defense University, is to educate national security professionals to plan and execute operational-level joint, multinational, and interagency operations to instill a primary commitment to joint, multinational, and interagency teamwork, attitudes, and perspectives.

== Schools composing the JFSC ==
- Joint Advanced Warfighting School (JAWS)
- Joint and Combined Warfighting School (JCWS)
- Joint Information School (JIS) formerly Joint Command, Control & Information Operations School (JC2IOS)

== Academic programs ==
- Joint and Combined Warfighting School (Resident, Satellite, and Hybrid)
- Joint Transition Course (JTC)
- Homeland Security Planner's Course (HLSPC)
- Joint, Interagency, and Multinational Planner's Course (JIMPC)

== History ==
In the 1930s, few officers were qualified to engage in joint operations either by training or experience. The demands of World War II brought out the urgent need for joint action by ground, sea, and air forces. To alleviate the friction and misunderstanding resulting from lack of joint experience, the Joint Chiefs of Staff established an Army and Navy Staff College (ANSCOL) in 1943. ANSCOL conducted a four-month course that was successful in training officers for joint command and staff duties. ANSCOL, which had been established to meet the immediate needs of war, was discontinued upon its conclusion.

A joint committee was appointed to prepare a directive for a new school. This directive, which the Joint Chiefs approved of Staff on 28 June 1946, established the Armed Forces Staff College (AFSC). Responsibility for the operation and maintenance of its facilities was charged to the Chief of Naval Operations.

Following a temporary residence in Washington, D.C., AFSC was established in Norfolk, Virginia, on 13 August 1946. The site, formerly a U.S. Naval Receiving Station, was selected by the Secretaries of War and Navy because of its immediate availability and its proximity to varied high-level military activities. There were 150 students from all Services in the first class. They assembled in converted administration buildings on 3 February 1947 to be greeted by the first commandant, Air Force Lieutenant General Delos C. Emmons. The faculty officers came from joint assignments in all theaters of World War II.

With Normandy Hall's construction in 1962, AFSC completed its transition from a temporary to a permanent institution. AFSC was assigned to the National Defense University (NDU) on 12 August 1981.

In the summer of 1990, AFSC changed from an intermediate level joint professional military education school for majors and lieutenant commanders to a temporary duty institution for majors/USN & USCG lieutenant commanders, lieutenant colonels/USN & USCG commanders, and colonels/USN & USCG captains for instruction in Phase II of the Chairman's Program for Joint Education is taught. This was in keeping with direction of the intent of the Goldwater-Nichols Act of a single site institution to provide joint "acculturation" of officers in the process of making said officers joint qualified.

In 1999, JFSC opened Okinawa Hall which houses the Congressman Owen Pickett Wargaming Center and the Congressman Ike Skelton Library, which is a specialized military library focusing on research in joint and combined operations, military history and naval science, operational warfare, and irregular warfare.

On 30 October 2000, the President Bill Clinton signed the Defense Authorization Bill renaming Armed Forces Staff College (AFSC) to the Joint Forces Staff College (JFSC).

The staff, faculty, and students are assigned by each Service to foster a joint atmosphere.

=== JPME Phase II ===
In the post-11 Sep 2001 environment, it became clear that JFSC had a finite throughput capacity in the number of officers it could produce annually who were either en route to, assigned to, or completing joint duty billets in order to become fully Joint Qualified Officers. As a result, changes in regulations expanded the availability of JPME Phase II education beyond JFSC and extended it to heretofore "senior service college" institutions that were previously authorized to only grant JPME Phase I credit. In 2006, in addition to the Joint Forces Staff College being approved to provide Phase II credits, the National War College and the Industrial College of the Armed Forces were entitled to offer both JPME Phase I and JPME Phase II. By 2007, the U.S. Army War College, the College of Naval Warfare at the U.S. Naval War College, the Marine Corps War College and the Air War College were also accredited to offer both JPME Phase I and II.

In 2013, in addition to JFSC's resident program in Norfolk, Virginia, a new-model Joint Professional Military Education Phase II course was established at the Joint Special Operations University (JSOU) at MacDill Air Force Base in Tampa, Florida. JFSC offers this 10-week satellite program course with equal air, land, and sea service, but hosted by JSOU, making it technically "non-resident." However, course participants attend classes full-time during the 10 weeks of instruction. This model reflects input from the combatant commands, which preferred the 10-week, full-time option rather than a longer-term, after-hours option that was originally proposed.

In the 2012 National Defense Authorization Act, Congress authorized a five-year test of non-resident JPME II at no more than two combatant command headquarters. The Joint Staff chose MacDill AFB in Tampa as the location for its first "satellite" program to maximize exposure to the large population of staff officers requiring JPME II education, this given that MacDill hosts the headquarters facilities of two combatant commands, U.S. Central Command (USCENTCOM) and U.S. Special Operations Command (USSOCOM). Although most of the students come from USCENTCOM and USSOCOM, one international fellow and one interagency student also attend each class. Classes are open to other commands at MacDill AFB, Coast Guard Air Station Clearwater, Coast Guard Sector St. Petersburg and other Reserve and National Guard activities in the Tampa area as room allows.

Congress requires the Secretary of Defense to report on the value of the program in 2015. Pending congressional approval, the satellite option may be offered to other combatant commands as soon as 2016.

The satellite program complements the existing JPME II course offered on-site at JFSC in Norfolk, being identical in length and nearly identical in academic content to the on-site version. The only academic difference is in the lessons on the elements of operational design, which use locally relevant case studies. For example, Norfolk-based students focus on the Revolutionary War Battle at nearby Yorktown, Virginia, while Tampa-based students focus on the Second Seminole Wars in Florida, of which several battle sites exist in the area of Central Florida surrounding Tampa.

Each year, about 800 students graduate from the 10-week Joint and Combined Warfighting School (JCWS) in-residence program at JFSC in Norfolk. Another 225 graduate each year from the 40-week Hybrid (JCWS-H) program, a mirror of JCWS Resident (JCWS-R) program JCWS-H is designed for Reserve and Active Component officers unable to take the 10 week resident or satellite courses because of their civilian or military careers. JCWS-H holds two separate face-to-face sessions totaling three weeks on site at JFSC in Norfolk, augmented by another 37 weeks of distance education .

=== Islam controversy ===
In April 2012, a course at the Joint Forces Staff College titled "Perspectives on Islam and Islamic Radicalism," taught by Lt. Col. Matthew A. Dooley, was suspended after an article in Wired reported that it advocated treating Islam as a hostile ideology and discussed the possibility of applying "total war" tactics—including targeting Mecca and Medina without regard for civilian deaths. The course, which had been taught since 2004, was permanently discontinued following the investigation.

The Council on American-Islamic Relations called for all officers who had taken the course to be re-trained. In response, the Department of Defense emphasized that the course was already under formal investigation and would be subject to oversight reforms.

On 20 June 2012, the Pentagon announced the completion of its inquiry into the JFSC course and a larger review of professional military education. The reviewers found that, with the exception of the elective course, "adequate academic standards exist for approving [PME] course curricula and presentations, and for selecting guest lecturers." Regarding the JFSC course, they found that "institutional failures in oversight and judgment" allowed the course to drift over time until it ceased to include instruction on U.S. counterterrorism strategy or on policy for countering violent extremism. The course has been suspended and will not be offered again until recommended changes have been made. The Army lieutenant colonel who taught the class has been relieved of his teaching duties. The report also recommended a review of the actions of two civilian JFSC officials to determine if administrative or disciplinary action would be appropriate, and a second military officer will receive administrative counseling.

=== Notable alumni ===
- Gen George Lee Butler, USAF
- LtGen Henry W. Buse Jr., USMC
- Maj Gen Reginald M. Cram, USAF
- RADM Jeremiah Denton, USN
- BGen Edward H. Forney, USMC
- GEN Tommy Franks, USA
- LTG James R. Hall, USA
- MG Benjamin Harrison, USA
- RADM Don A. Jones, NOAA
- GEN Frederick Kroesen, USA
- VADM Andrew L. Lewis, USN
- COL Nicholas Lorusso, USAR (and former member of the Louisiana House of Representatives, Republican)
- LTG H. R. McMaster, USA
- Gen Merrill McPeak, USAF
- VADM David C. Nichols, Jr., USN
- BGen Erik A. Peterson, USAF
- BG Paul D. Phillips, USA
- Gen Lori Robinson, USAF
- MG William A. Ryan III
- RADM Stuart C. Satterwhite, USN
- Gen Norton A. Schwartz, USAF
- Lt Gen James W. Stansberry, USAF
- ADM Kurt W. Tidd, USN
- RADM Mark L. Tidd, CHC, USN
- Lt Gen David Wade, USAF

== Location ==
The Joint Forces Staff College is located at Naval Support Activity Hampton Roads, adjacent to Naval Station Norfolk.

In regards to dependent children living on-base, the on-property housing is zoned to Norfolk Public Schools and is assigned to: Sewells Point Elementary School, Blair Middle School, and Maury High School.
