= Paslode =

American tool manufacturer

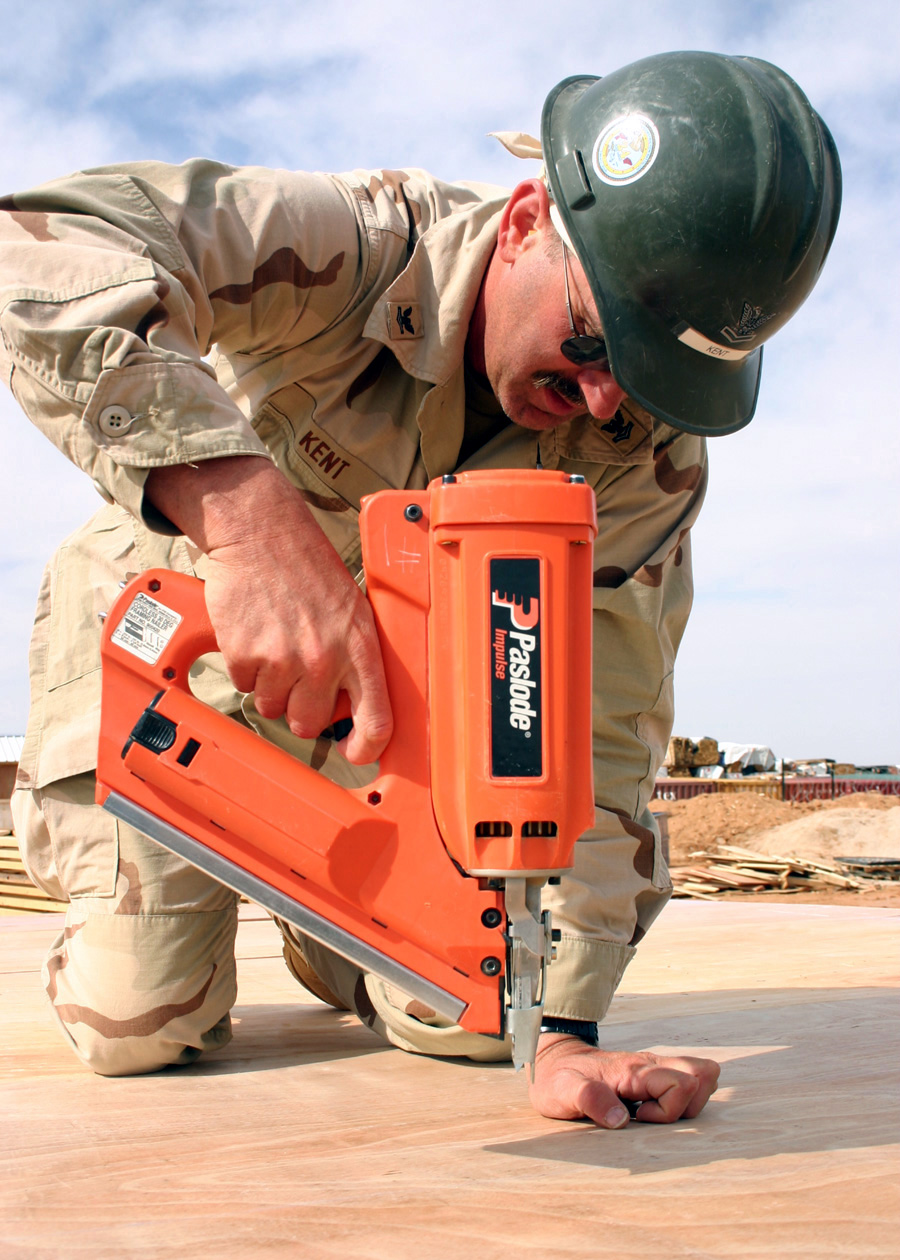
- Paslode nail gun used by US navy sailor in 2005
- Type: Subsidiary
- Industry: Manufacturing
- Founded: 1935; 91 years ago
- Founder: J.W. Leslie
- Headquarters: United States
- Area served: Worldwide
- Products: Nail and staple guns
- Owner: Illinois Tool Works (ITW)
- Website: www.paslode.com

Paslode is an American tool manufacturer that is a subsidiary of Illinois Tool Works. Paslode is an acronym for Packing Shipping Loading Devices and was founded in 1935. The company develops and manufactures nail and staple guns; either powered by proprietary butane cylinders (in combination with battery power) or an external supply of pressurized air. The brand is easily identified by their unique orange and black colouring.

== History ==
In 1940, Paslode created the first Stapling Hammer. In 1959, the world's first Pneumatic nailer. By 1986, they had created the Impulse range of gas actuated nailing systems, commonly referred to as a nail gun.

In 1986, ITW (Illinois Tool Works) acquired Paslode.

In 2002, the PASLODE brand joined the SPIT company in France, which is also part of the ITW Group.
