= Hobart Corporation =

American food service equipment manufacturer

- Formerly: Hobart Electric Manufacturing Company
- Type: Subsidiary
- Industry: Foodservice
- Founded: 1897; 129 years ago
- Headquarters: Troy, Ohio, United States
- Parent: Illinois Tool Works
- Website: Hobart Corporation

The Hobart Corporation is an American mid-market provider of commercial grocery and foodservice equipment. The company manufactures food preparation machines for cutting, slicing and mixing, cooking equipment, refrigeration units, warewashing and waste disposal systems, and weighing, wrapping, and labeling systems and products. Hobart is an international company with manufacturing plants in the US, Brazil, Canada, China, France, Germany, Italy, and the UK.

== History ==
Hobart was founded in 1897 as the Hobart Electric Manufacturing Company in Troy, Ohio, by Clarence Charles Hobart. To increase motor sales, the company attached motors to coffee mills and meat grinders, creating a powered food production machine.

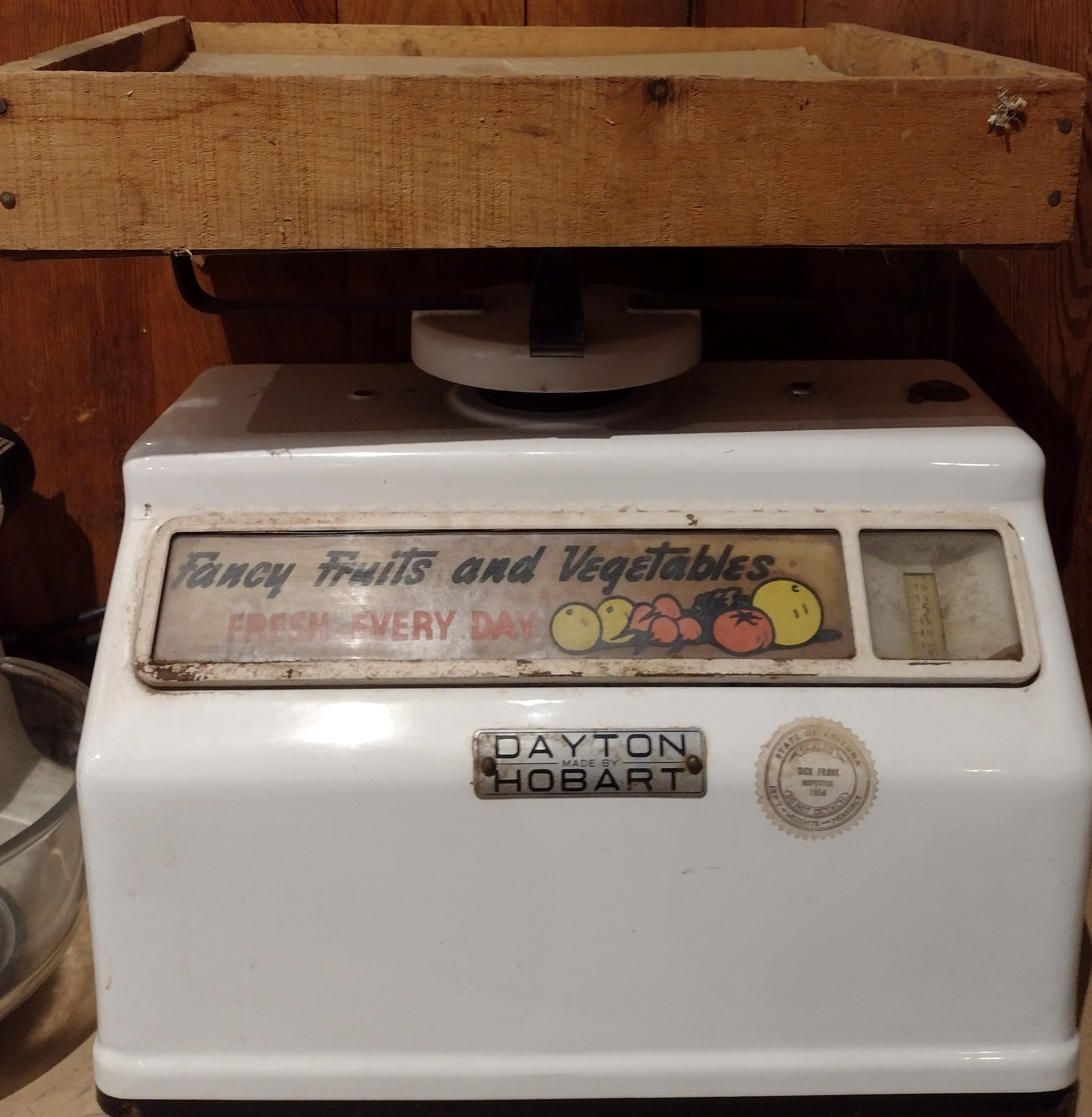
Vintage Dayton-Hobart industrial scale

The company reorganized in 1913 as The Hobart Manufacturing Company and became Hobart Corporation in 1974. The former KitchenAid division was formed in 1919. In 1934, Hobart bought the Dayton Scale Company (an IBM division) from IBM. Dart & Kraft acquired Hobart in 1981. KitchenAid was sold to Whirlpool Corporation in 1986 after the consummation of a $150 million purchase offer proposed in January 1985. Dart & Kraft split in 1986, with Hobart becoming part of Premark. Premark was acquired by Illinois Tool Works in 1999. In 2001, Hobart became a part of Illinois Tool Works Food Equipment Group.
