= Stuart C. Satterwhite =

Stuart C. Satterwhite is a Rear Admiral in the United States Navy. He is the Commander of the MyNavy Career Center.

== Career ==
A native of Sterling, Virginia, Stuart C. Satterwhite entered the Navy via the Reserve Officers' Training Corps at Georgia Tech. After completing his training, Satterwhite served aboard the USS Milwaukee (AOR-2) and the USS Robert G. Bradley.

Satterwhite received further education at the Naval Postgraduate School, the Naval War College and the Joint Forces Staff College before being assigned to the USS George Washington (CVN-73) from 2003 to 2005. Afterward, he was stationed with the Office of the Chief of Naval Personnel and later deployed to serve in the Iraq War.

Among Satterwhite's other tours has been as Commander of the United States Military Entrance Processing Command. Decorations he has received include the Defense Superior Service Medal, the Legion of Merit, the Bronze Star Medal, the Meritorious Service Medal, the Navy Commendation Medal, the Navy Achievement Medal, the Joint Meritorious Unit Award and the Meritorious Unit Commendation.
