= Park View High School (Loudoun County, Virginia) =

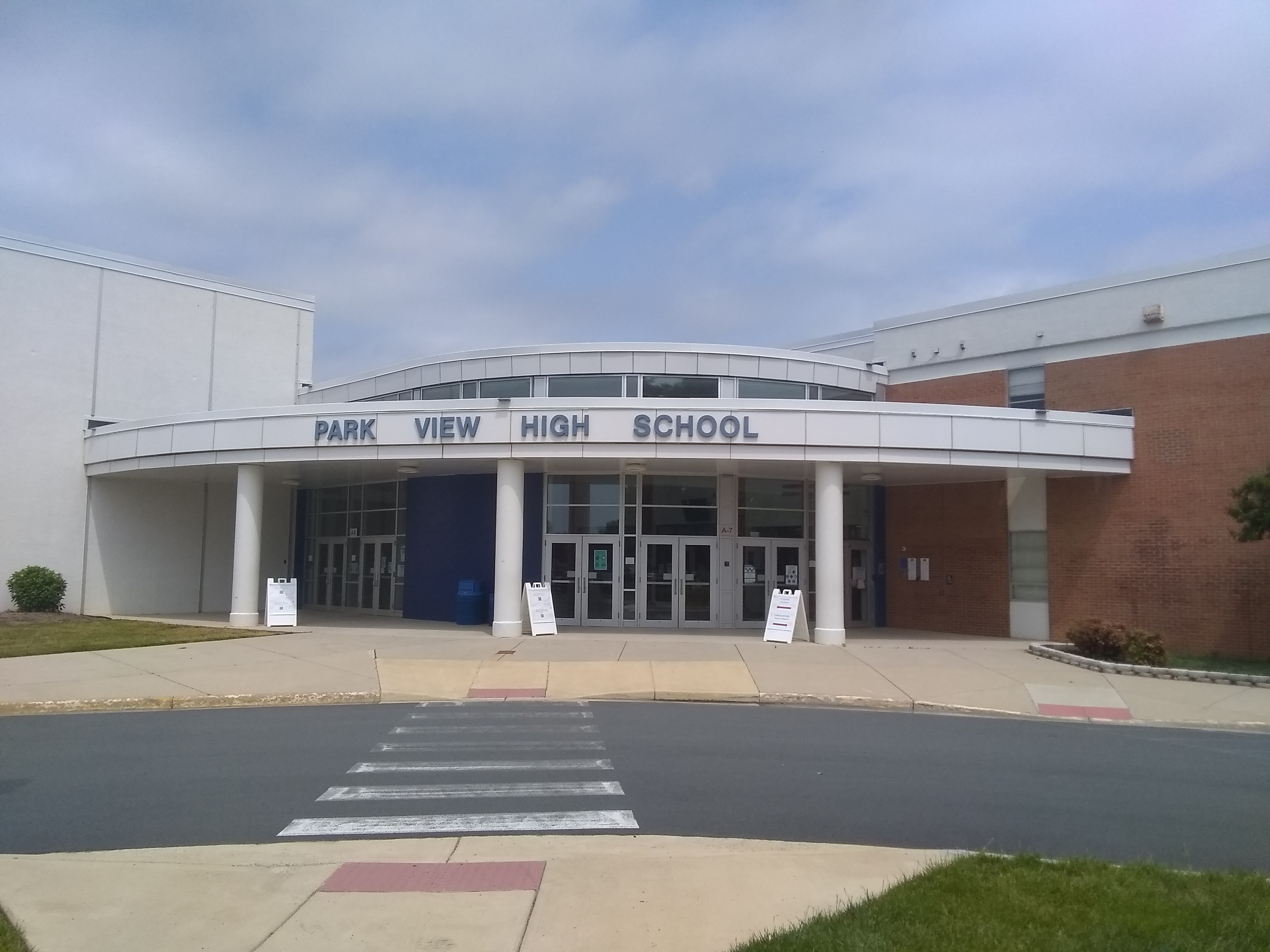

Location
- 400 West Laurel Avenue; Sterling, Virginia 20164; United States; 39°0′54″N 77°24′2.9″W

Information
- School type: Public, high school
- Founded: 1976
- School district: Loudoun County Public Schools
- Principal: Jason Jefferson
- Grades: 9–12
- Enrollment: 1,549 (2016–17)
- Language: English
- Campus: Suburban
- Colors: Red, white, and blue
- Athletics conference: Dulles District; Region II
- Nickname: Patriots
- Rival: Potomac Falls High School; Dominion High School
- Communities served: Sterling Park; Old Sterling; Lochewood; Dominion View; Connemara Woods
- Feeder schools: Forest Grove Elementary School, Sully Elementary School, Guilford Elementary School, Rolling Ridge Elementary School, Sterling Elementary School, Sterling Middle School
- Website: https://www.lcps.org/pvhs

Park View High School is a public secondary school in Sterling, an unincorporated area in Loudoun County, Virginia, United States. The school is part of Loudoun County Public Schools and is located at 400 West Laurel Avenue in the Sterling Park community.

== History ==
Park View High School opened in 1976 and served the entire Sterling Park and Sugarland areas. When Richard Bonieskie opened Park View, it offered state of the art facilities, including a large auditorium and a two-level library, which gave the school the nickname "University of Park View" during the years following its opening.

As eastern Loudoun County began to experience high growth in the 1980s and 1990s, a considerable portion of its student body was fed into Potomac Falls High School, which opened in 1997. In 2003, more of Park View's student body were fed not only into Potomac Falls, but also into Dominion High School, which opened that year.

Park View was extensively renovated between 2002 and 2004. The renovations included moving the library to the first floor, expanding it, adding classrooms on the second floor, reconstructing the main offices and guidance offices, the senior courtyard, and constructing a foyer on the front of the building. In 2005, the auditorium was also renovated and features new seats, a new curtain, and new theater systems. In 2017, furniture and charging stations were added around the school.

== Controversies ==
In 2014, three students of the graduating class of 2014 vandalized the school as their senior prank. School officials could not identify who the students were due to the students wearing masks. The graffiti contained explicit images and profane language, as claimed by the officials. The incident divided the student body in addition to angering the parents and school faculties.

In 2015, Park View student Danny Centeno-Miranda was shot and killed while on his way to school. Three people were caught and charged with crimes after the murder.

In 2018, a controversy arose after Park View received a donation from the Redskins to build a turf field. Backlash arose after the school's football program was canceled after lack of participation from students and alleged absence of funds. LCPS stated that coaches and directors were working hard towards creating a new schedule that better fits Park View's level of competitiveness. Due to the negative responses from the community, Hilarie Burton (Park View alumna) donated to the school in hopes of restoring the football programming in the following year.

In September and October 2023, nine students at the school overdosed on fentanyl. Four of the overdoses took place on school property with medical personnel administering naloxone in three cases and CPR twice. The high school principal and Loudoun County School officials delayed informing parents of the overdoses for almost three weeks, prompting Virginia governor Glenn Youngkin to issue an executive order mandating public schools notify parents of overdoses within 24 hours.

== Demographics ==
=== Enrollment by grade ===
Grade	Students
9	354
10	337
11	315
12	298

=== Enrollment by race/ethnicity ===
Race/ethnicity	Students
American Indian	1%
Asian	13%
Black	5%
Hispanic	64%
White	14%
Biracial	2%

=== Enrollment by gender ===
Gender	Students
Male	750
Female	554

Total students: 1304

== Accreditation and test scores ==
=== Accreditation ===
Park View High School is a fully accredited high school based on the Standards of Learning tests in Virginia. The school went through SACS accreditation in November 2009.

=== Graduation statistics ===
School year	Graduation rate	Percentage of the class attending college	Percentage of the class graduating from college within 4 years
2018	73%	34%	16%

== Enrollment history ==
School year	Number of students
1995–1996	1,394
1996–1997	1,390
1997–1998	1,382
1998–1999	1,416
1999–2000	1,481
2000–2001	1,502
2001–2002	1,563
2002–2003	1,624
2003–2004	1,387
2004–2005	1,330
2005–2006	1,300
2006–2007	1,288
2008–2009	1,253

== Notable alumni ==
- Hilarie Burton, class of 2000, former MTV TRL VJ, actress, former star of One Tree Hill.
- Billy King, class of 1984, former basketball player and winner of the Henry Iba Corinthian National Defensive Player of the Year award with the Duke Blue Devils, former general manager and team president of the Philadelphia 76ers and former general manager of the Brooklyn Nets
- Jeff Lageman, class of 1985, former NFL defensive end for the Jacksonville Jaguars and the New York Jets
- Allen Pinkett, class of 1982, former running back for the Notre Dame Fighting Irish and the Houston Oilers

== See also ==
- Loudoun County Public Schools
