= Loudoun Academy of Science =

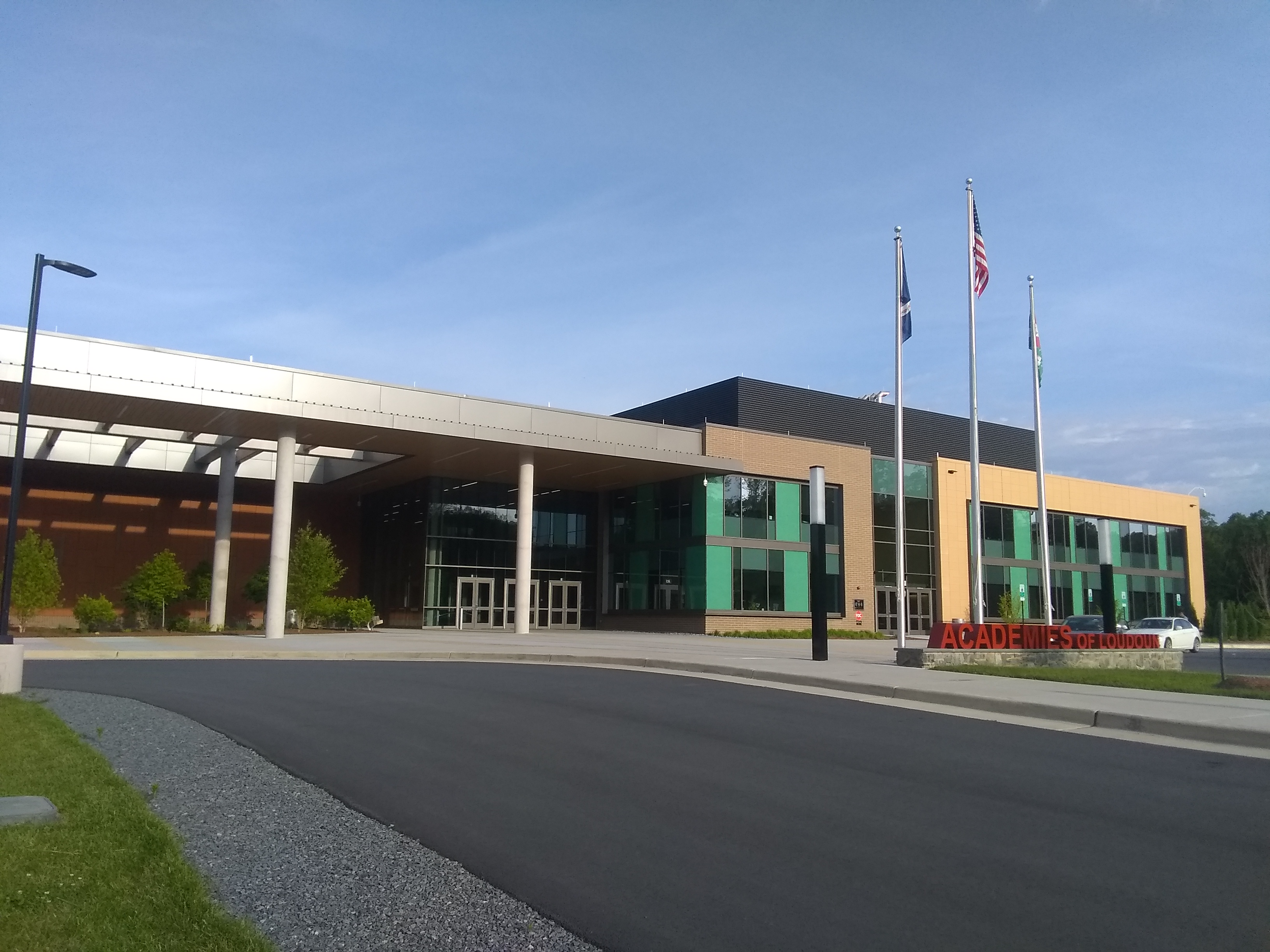

Location
- 42075 Academy Drive; Leesburg, VA 20175; Loudoun, Virginia
- 39.042637°N 77.550348°W

Information
- Type: Magnet school (Division)
- Motto: Explore, Research, Collaborate, Innovate
- Established: 2005
- School district: Loudoun County Public Schools
- Principal: Ryan Sackett
- Grades: 9-12
- Enrollment: ~500
- Colors: Blue, Turquoise, and Green
- Athletics: None
- Mascot: Raptor
- Director of the Academy Of Science: Jennifer Chang
- Website: Official Webpage

The Academy of Science (AOS) is a STEM program for high school students enrolled in Loudoun County Public Schools. The program was previously located in Dominion High School. During the summer of 2018, the Academy of Science joined the Monroe Advanced Technical Academy (MATA) and the new Academy of Engineering and Technology (AET) to form the Academies of Loudoun (ACL). The Academies of Loudoun opened with a new campus located in Leesburg, Virginia.

== History and structure ==
The Academy of Science program was established in 2005 as a magnet program for Loudoun County high school students. The program has an acceptance rate of 7.2% in 2020, which is the most up-to-date statistic data published by LCPS. The coursework focuses on science and math with a Dual Enrollment and numerous Advanced Placement Courses. In the final two years, students take an independent research class.

== Admissions ==
Applications to join the Academy of Science begin in student's final year of middle school. Applicants are judged based on test scores, a writing section, and grades.

AOS and AET came under scrutiny in 2019 by the NAACP for alleged discrimination against black students during the admission process. This is despite as of 2024 using a strictly blind admissions process where the personal details of students remain unattached to the student's application until it has been accepted, waitlisted, or denied.

== Extracurricular activities and athletics ==
Loudoun County high schools have alternating day schedules that allows Academies students to attend both their home high school as well as the academies on alternating days. ACL has extracurricular clubs available to students during their lunch period. There are non-athletic sports teams at the Academies, but no athletic sports teams. Students attending the Academies are able to join extracurriculars and athletic sports teams at their home high schools.

== Academics ==
In the first two years, students take an integrated science course that covers physics, chemistry, and earth science. In the fourth year, students can take a variety of Advanced Placement courses including biology, chemistry, environmental science, and physics. During the first two years students take an integrated math course, which covers algebra, trigonometry, calculus A, and math analysis. In their final two years, students can either take a AP Calculus AB and BC or AP calculus BC followed by a Dual enrollment multivariable calculus course. In the last three years, students are enrolled in research courses, which allows students to develop a scientific research project and carry it out.

In their third and fourth year students conduct research formulated and approved during their second year. Around a dozen papers have been published from student conducted research with the majority remaining unpublished. Research projects from AOS have been published and have placed in competitions like the Siemens Westinghouse Competition and International Science and Engineering Fair.

Students are given a research budget of approximately $200, which does not include instrumentation. Some instrumentation that is currently owned by AOS includes, an electron microscope, FTIR, gas centrifuges, an ashing oven, 3D printers, bio 3D printers, fatigue cycle testing machinery, material strength testing via a hydraulic press.

Students are given the opportunity to collaborate with students of the Hwa Chong Institution in Singapore and Daegu Science High School in South Korea.
