= Fume extractor (soldering) =

Soldering filter

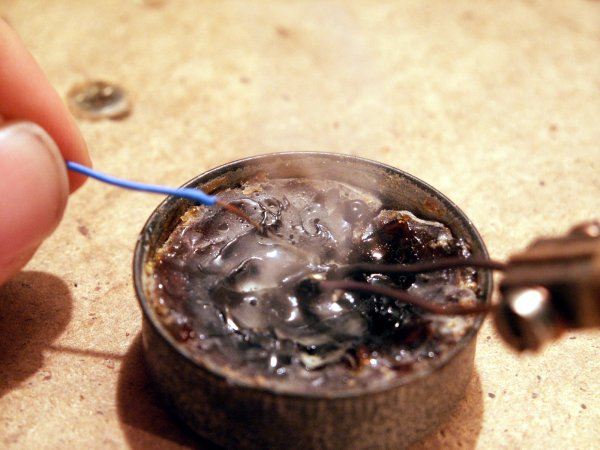
Fumes generated by soldering

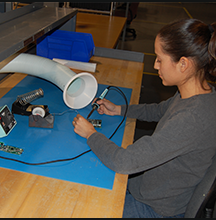
A woman at a bench working in front of a filtration system

A fume extractor is a device used to filter aerosolized chemical byproducts of the soldering process. These devices take many forms depending on the project size and application, from small ductwork to entire fume hoods. Solder itself, which is generally composed of low melting temperature metals and adjunctives, as well as the various components used during the act of soldering, including flux, rosin, and the various coatings found on solderable materials, like Polytetrafluoroethylene together present a substantial occupational health hazard. The goal of a fume extractor is to move these environmental pollutants away from the user and other occupants of the room as quickly and efficaciously as possible so as to stay within the safe exposure limits of the various substances present, and reduce the risk of adverse health outcomes like metal fume fever, polymer fume fever, occupational asthma, and allergic reaction.

== Operation ==
A fume extractor can be a fume hood, but can also be a different type of device. Most machines seen consist of some kind of fan that draws air in, and a filter or other to trap the chemicals. While simple, it is often effective at preventing harm to the worker. Quality can range from improvised setups of table fans and residential air filters to industrial machines that filter air out through the buildings ventilation system.

== See also ==
- Dust collection system
- Dust collector
- LEV
