= Brooks Instrument =

Equipment manufacturer company

Brooks Instrument, LLC
- Type: Flow Meter Manufacturer
- Founder: Stephen A. Brooks
- Headquarters: Hatfield, PA, United States
- Products: Thermal Mass Flow Controllers/Meters; Coriolis Mass Flow Controllers/Meters; Variable Area Flow Meters(aka Rotameters); Direct Liquid Injection Vaporizer Systems; Ultrasonic Liquid Flow Controllers; Pressure Products; Cylinder Scales; Vacuum Capacitance Manometers; Level Measurement Products
- Number of employees: >500
- Website: BrooksInstrument.com

Brooks Instrument is a manufacturer of flow control and measurement equipment based in Hatfield, PA. It was a division of Emerson (NYSE:EMR) until December 31, 2007 when it was sold to American Industrial Partners Capital Fund IV (“AIP”) for approximately $100 million in cash. In January 2012, Brooks Instrument was acquired by ITW for an unspecified amount.

Its products include thermal mass flow controllers/meters, Coriolis mass flow controllers/meters, variable area meters (aka rotameters), level products, direct liquid injection systems, and more. A range of accessories such as pressure controllers, valves, and secondary instrumentation is also offered. Manufacturing of Brooks products is based in Hatfield, PA USA facility with additional facilities in the Netherlands, Hungary, and Japan. Brooks Instrument is certified to ISO 9001:2015.

== History ==
Founded in 1946 by Stephen A. Brooks, Brooks Instrument was originally based in Lansdale, Pennsylvania. The company was built on the strength of an innovative side-plate, dowel-pin principle of rotameter construction, which is, today, the basis of one of the company's more important product lines.

In 1958 the company developed a new, streamlined laboratory flow meter named Sho-Rate and a new type of full-view rotameter - with an improved packaging seal that represents one of the first innovations for the glass tube rotameter in 20 years.

== Public service initiatives ==
In 2018, corporate leaders at Brooks introduced a new, annual scholarship program, which awards up to $2,000 per individual to undergraduate engineering students at accredited colleges or universities. The program is designed to support students who show "potential for leadership and interest in engineering, particularly as it relates to instrumentation, fluid mechanics and flow or pressure measurement."
