= Billy King (basketball) =

American basketball executive (born 1966)

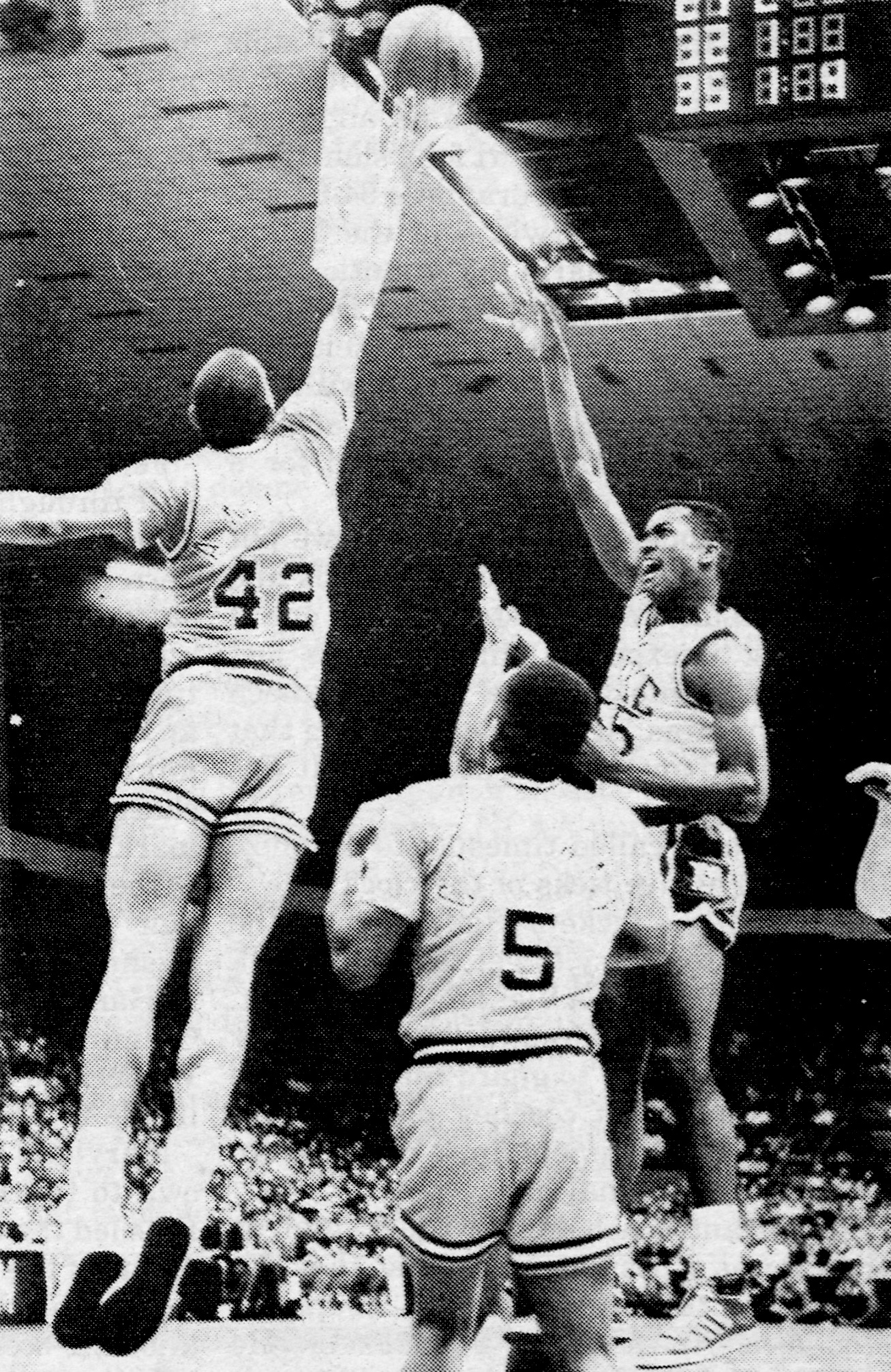
- King making a rainbow shot in 1986

Personal information
- Born: January 23, 1966 (age 60) Sterling, Virginia, U.S.
- Listed height: 6 ft 6 in (1.98 m)

Career information
- High school: Park View (Sterling, Virginia)
- College: Duke (1984–1988)
- Position: Small forward
- Number: 55

Career highlights
- NABC Defensive Player of the Year (1988)
Medals
Men's basketball
Representing United States
Summer Universiade
Silver medal – second place	1987 Zagreb	National team

Billy Matthew King (born January 23, 1966) is an American basketball executive. He is the former general manager of the Brooklyn Nets and Philadelphia 76ers NBA teams, as well as former team president of the 76ers.

== Early life and education ==
King grew up in Sterling, Virginia where he played basketball at Park View High School.

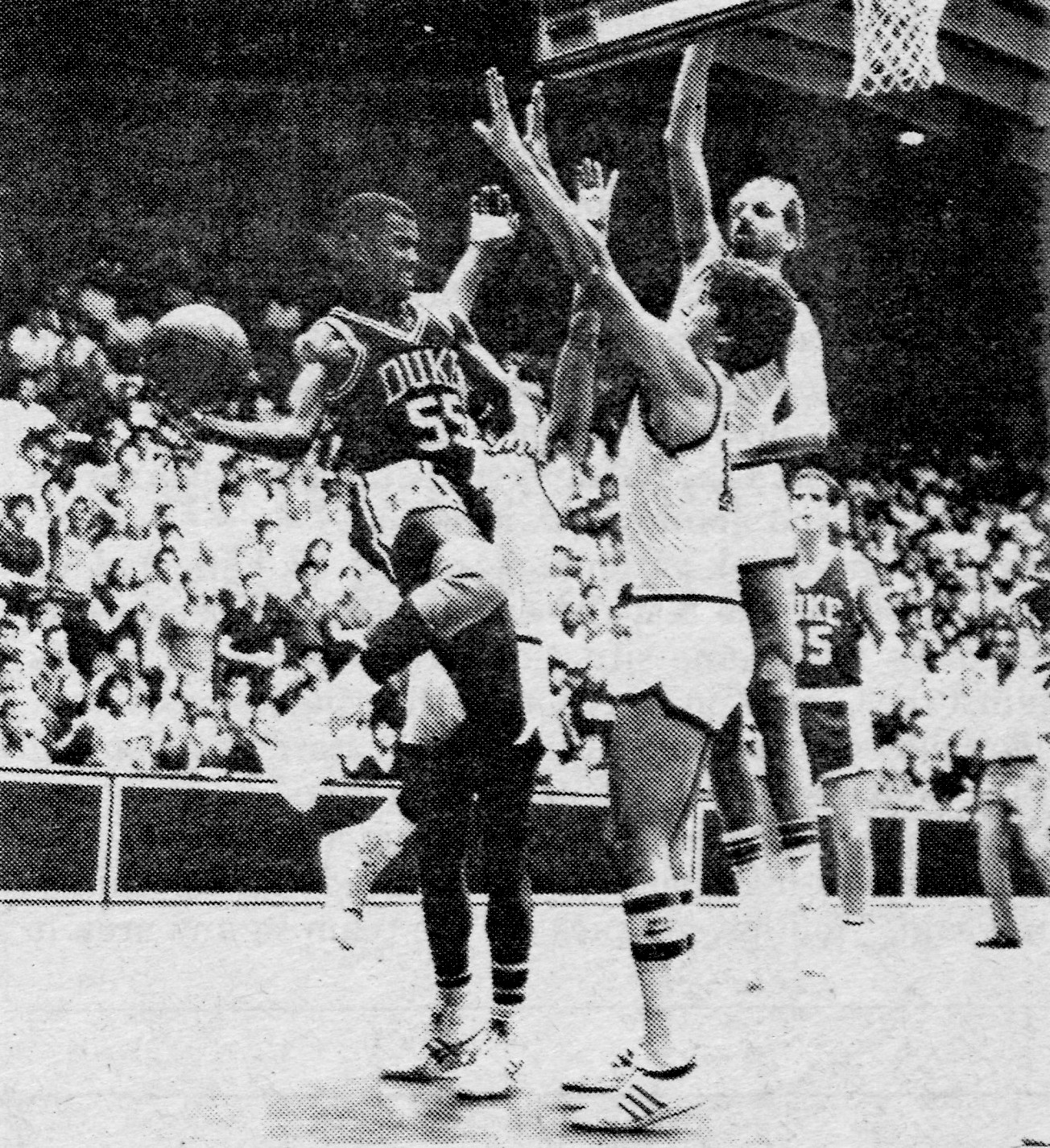
King with Duke, circa 1985

He received a scholarship to play at Duke University and wore jersey number 55. He was known primarily for his tough defense. In his senior season, he served as a captain of Duke's 1988 Final Four team and was named NABC National Defensive Player of The Year.

== Post-playing career ==
King served as an assistant coach for the Indiana Pacers for four seasons under Larry Brown. He joined the professional ranks after spending four seasons as an assistant at Illinois State University under head coach Bob Bender. King also spent one year as a color analyst for ESPN's men's basketball coverage of the Ohio Valley Conference.

King then joined the Philadelphia 76ers on June 2, 1997, as vice president of basketball administration. On May 19, 1998, he was promoted to general manager, and on April 5, 2000, he signed a new contract to stay with the team for an extended term. On May 26, 2003, he was named president along with general manager.

In 2005, King and other individuals became prominent investors in a Foxwoods Resort Casino proposed for Philadelphia, Pennsylvania. In September 2008, facing massive opposition at the originally proposed waterfront location, backers for the slots casino decided to seek a new location in the Center City area, next to Philadelphia's Chinatown community.

On December 4, 2007, the 76ers replaced King with former New Jersey Nets general manager Ed Stefanski. King made questionable decisions during his time as general manager for the 76ers. Decisions include his trade of fan favorite Allen Iverson for Andre Miller, drafting Larry Hughes over Dirk Nowitzki and Paul Pierce in the 1998 NBA Draft, and trading for aging Chris Webber.

On July 14, 2010, King was hired as a general manager for the New Jersey Nets, replacing former Nets president and general manager Rod Thorn. As general manager of the Nets, King's legacy in the NBA was hurt by a series of oft-criticized trades that were deemed among the "worst in league history", notably trading multiple unprotected first-round picks to the Boston Celtics (two of which would later become All-Stars Jaylen Brown and Jayson Tatum) in exchange for older star-quality players in Kevin Garnett and Paul Pierce alongside Jason Terry. On January 10, 2016, it was announced that the Nets had reassigned King. His position would be replaced by former NBA player and San Antonio Spurs assistant general manager Sean Marks.

On October 2, 2019, it was announced that King was joining the morning sport talk radio show on 94 WIP in Philadelphia. On March 28, 2022, Billy King was hired by Modern Executive Solutions as a Senior Partner Head of Sports and Entertainment. On February 12, 2024, Billy King joined ZRG Partners and TurnkeyZRG as a managing director.

== Personal life ==
King married the former Melanie Lynn Frantz on August 27, 2005. They have three children.
