= Paslode Impulse =

Cordless nail gun

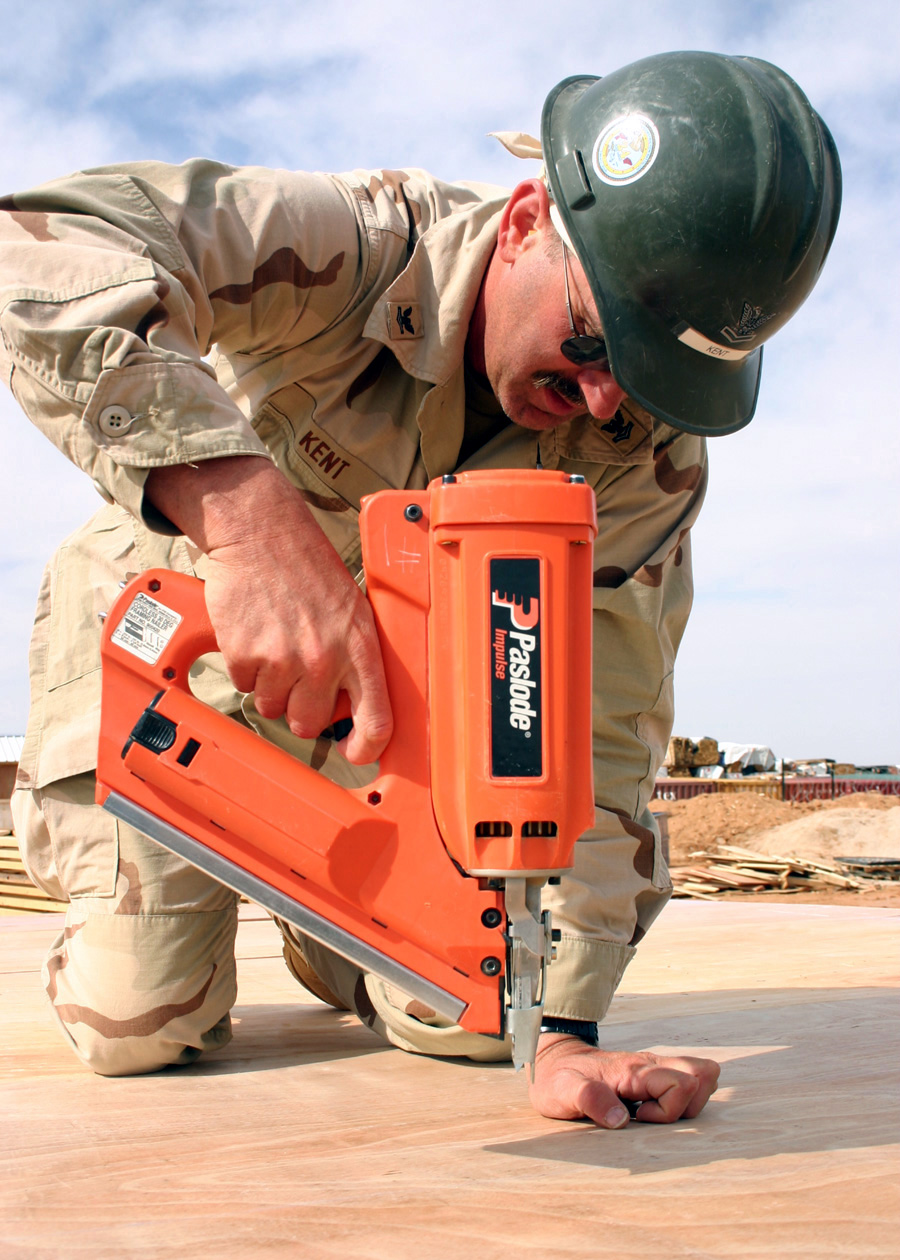
A Paslode nail gun

Paslode Impulse is a trademarked name for a cordless nail gun manufactured by Paslode. Cordless nail guns do not need an air compressor. Instead, they use what Paslode calls a "fuel cell", but is actually a very small two stroke engine which fires one ignition stroke for each nail driven, and reloads itself from a small metal can filled with pressurized flammable gas (a mixture of propene and but-1-ene). It has a battery pack and a high-voltage power supply, to deliver a spark.

The combustion chamber is divided in two parts and is normally open to the atmosphere. When the contact tip is pushed onto a piece of work, the lower piston chamber (which also serves as the piston bore) is pushed into the upper part, sealing it. Simultaneously, a metered amount of fuel is squirted into the chamber from the fuel container. When the trigger is pulled, a spark plug ignites the fuel charge, pushing the piston and connected drive pin to the bottom of the chamber and driving a nail. A small amount of combustion gas is briefly stored in a side chamber and is used to push the piston back into the ready position after the nail is driven.

After the contact tip is lifted from the work, the combustion chamber opens and a small fan blows away the exhaust gas. Pressing the contact tip to the work without pulling the trigger uses one of the metered fuel charges. The unburned fuel is then blown away by the exhaust fan when the contact tip is removed from the work. These are best used in finish-nailing situations, which are where these tools are most common.

Paslode Impulse nail guns are available as framing and finish nailers using a variety of nail types and lengths. They are well known by tradesmen for the smell of emitted exhaust gas, which some may find offensive. The fuel is a mixture of propene and but-1-ene. The fuel cells are designed to last for 1,000 rounds each, which makes them desirable for heavy duty projects where thousands of nails or staples are needed.
