= C. S. Monroe Technology Center =

C. S. Monroe Technology
- Leesburg, Virginia 20175; United States

Information
- Type: Vocational
- Established: 1977

C. S. Monroe Technology Center was a part-time, vocational secondary school located in Leesburg, a town in Loudoun County, Virginia. It was part of the Loudoun County Public School system, and it is a Virginia Governor's STEM Academy. The school was named after Charles S. Monroe, a teacher and principal at Leesburg High School. The school closed in June 2018, however the programs and courses are now offered through the Academies of Loudoun, which opened in August 2018. Demolition of the building started at the beginning of February 2020.

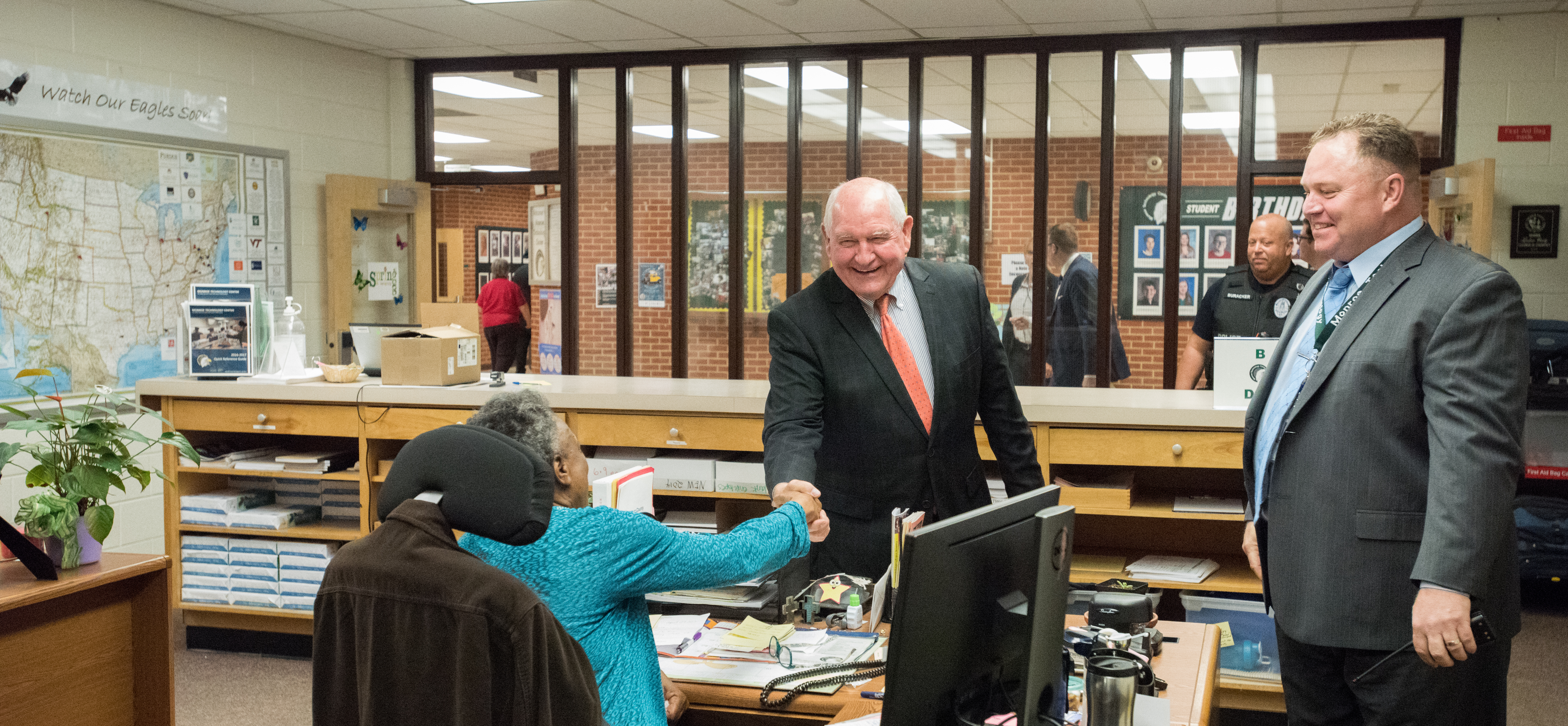
Sonny Perdue visiting the school in May 2017 to speak with agriculture students

== Structure ==
Students attended C. S. Monroe Technology Center every other school day. On the remaining days, they attended the non-magnet high school determined by typical attendance boundaries.

== Academic programs ==
At time of closing, C. S. Monroe Technology Center offered courses in a number of vocational fields. Many courses offered dual enrollment credit in partnership with Northern Virginia Community College.

Programs of study

- Administration of Justice
- Auto Collision Repair Technology
- Auto Servicing Repair Technology
- Biotechnology
- Building Construction
- Computer & Digital Animation
- Computer Integrated Engineering & Design
- Computer Network Administration
- Computer Systems Technology
- Cosmetology
- Culinary Arts
- Emergency Medical Technician
- Environmental Plant Science
- Firefighter
- Graphic Communications
- Heating, Ventilation & Air Conditioning
- Introduction to Health & Medical Science
- Masonry
- Medical Laboratory Technology
- Nail Design
- Pharmacy Technology
- Practical Nursing
- Radiology Technology
- TV Production & Digital Moviemaking
- Veterinary Science
- Welding
