= Metal fume fever =

- Specialty: Emergency medicine

Metal fume fever, also known as brass founders' ague, brass shakes, zinc shakes, galvie flu, galvo poisoning, metal dust fever, metal malaria, welding shivers, or Monday morning fever, is an illness primarily caused by inhalation of zinc oxide (ZnO), or rarely magnesium oxide (MgO) or copper oxide (CuO) which are produced as byproducts of metal processing. Other common sources are fuming silver, gold, platinum, and chromium.

Welders are routinely exposed to fumes. The most common form of exposure among welders occurs when welding galvanized steel, of which zinc is the primary component of the galvanization process. Galvanized metal must be thoroughly cleaned using an abrasive or chemical means to remove the galvanized coating before welding or burning. Brazing and soldering can also cause metal poisoning due to exposure to lead, zinc, copper, or cadmium. In extreme cases, cadmium (present in some older silver solder alloys) can cause loss of consciousness.

== Signs and symptoms ==
The signs and symptoms are generally flu-like. They include fever, chills, nausea, headache, fatigue, muscle aches, joint pains, lack of appetite, shortness of breath, pneumonia, chest pain, change in blood pressure, dizziness, and coughing. A sweet or metallic taste in the mouth may also be reported, along with a dry or irritated throat which may lead to hoarseness. Symptoms of a more severe metal toxicity may also include a burning sensation in the body, shock, no urine output, collapse, convulsions, shortness of breath, yellow eyes or yellow skin, rash, vomiting, watery or bloody diarrhea or low or high blood pressure, which require prompt medical attention. For zinc oxide, the onset of symptoms may be delayed for several hours, but typically resolve within 24 to 48 hours.

== Cause ==
Exposure usually arises through hot metalworking processes, such as smelting and casting of zinc alloys, welding of galvanized metals, brazing, or soldering. If the metal concerned is particularly high-risk, the residue from cold sanding processes may also cause fume fever, even if the dose is lower. It may also be caused by electroplated surfaces or metal-rich anti-corrosion paint, such as cadmium passivated steel or zinc chromate primer on aluminium aircraft parts. Exposure has also been reported in use of lead-free ammunition, by the harder steel core stripping metal from the jacket of the bullet and barrel of the rifle.

The most plausible metabolic source of the symptoms is a dose-dependent release of certain cytokines, an event which occurs by inhaling metal oxide fumes that injure the lung cells. This is not an allergic reaction, though allergic reactions to metal fumes can occur.

== Diagnosis ==
Diagnosis is primarily anecdotal, that is, it depends upon a good occupational history. Diagnosis of metal fume fever can be easily missed because the complaints are non-specific, resemble a number of other common illnesses, and presentation occurs typically 2–10 hours after the exposure. When respiratory symptoms are prominent, metal fume fever may be confused with acute bronchitis or pneumonia. The diagnosis is based primarily upon a history of exposure to metal oxide fumes. Cain and Fletcher (2010) report a case of metal fume fever that was diagnosed only by taking a full occupational history and by close collaboration between primary and secondary health care personnel.

Physical symptoms vary among persons exposed, depending largely upon the stage in the course of the syndrome during which examination occurs. Patients may present with wheezing or crackles in the lungs. They typically have an increased white blood cell count, and urine, blood plasma and skin zinc levels may be elevated. Chest X-ray abnormalities may also be present.

An interesting feature of metal fume fever involves rapid adaptation to the development of the syndrome following repeated metal oxide exposure. Workers with a history of recurrent metal fume fever often develop a tolerance to the fumes. This tolerance, however, is transient, and only persists through the work week. After a weekend hiatus, the tolerance has usually disappeared. This phenomenon of tolerance is what led to the name "Monday morning syndrome".

In 2018, there were 259 cases of metal fume fever reported to the United States Poison Control Center.

== Treatment ==
Treatment of mild metal fume fever consists of bedrest, keeping the patient well hydrated, and symptomatic therapy (e.g. aspirin for headaches) as indicated. In the case of non-allergic acute lung injury, standard or recommended approaches to treatment have not been defined.

The consumption of large quantities of cow's milk, either before or immediately after exposure is a traditional remedy. However, the United Kingdom Health and Safety Executive challenges this advice, warning, "Don't believe the stories about drinking milk before welding. It does not prevent you getting metal fume fever."

== Prevention ==
Prevention of metal fume fever in workers who are at risk (such as welders) involves avoidance of direct contact with potentially toxic fumes, improved engineering controls (exhaust ventilation systems), personal protective equipment (respirators), and education of workers regarding the features of the syndrome itself and proactive measures to prevent its development.

In some cases, the product's design may be changed so as to eliminate the use of risky metals. Cadmium is often replaced by other metals. NiCd rechargeable batteries are being replaced by NiMH. These contain other toxic metals, such as chromium, vanadium and cerium. Zinc or nickel plating can be used instead of cadmium plating, and brazing filler alloys now rarely contain cadmium.

If removed prior to welding, the zinc coating on galvanized steel will not create harmful fumes and is therefore safe to weld. A zinc coating should be removed by at least one to four inches around the area to be welded. Grinding has been reported as the easiest method of zinc coating removal.

== See also ==
- Occupational asthma
- Polymer fume fever
