= Polymer fume fever =

- Other names: Fluoropolymer fever
- Chemical structure of Teflon, the polymer whose breakdown products cause this condition
- Specialty: Emergency medicine
- Symptoms: fever, shaking chills, arthralgias, myalgias, headache, and malaise

Polymer fume fever or fluoropolymer fever, also informally called Teflon flu, is an inhalation fever caused by the fumes released when polytetrafluoroethylene (PTFE, known under the trade name Teflon) reaches temperatures of 300 to 450 °C (572 to 842 °F).

== Fever ==
When PTFE is heated above 450 °C (842 °F) the pyrolysis products are different and inhalation may cause acute lung injury. Symptoms are flu-like (chills, headaches and fevers) with chest tightness and mild cough. Onset occurs about 4 to 8 hours after exposure to the pyrolysis products of PTFE. A high white blood cell count may be seen and chest x-ray findings are usually minimal.

The polymer fumes are especially harmful to certain animals whose breathing, optimized for rapidity, allows in toxins which are excluded by human lungs. Fumes from Teflon in very high heat are fatal to parrots, as well as some other birds (PTFE toxicosis).

== See also ==
- Metal fume fever
