= Sterling, Virginia =

- Census-designated place
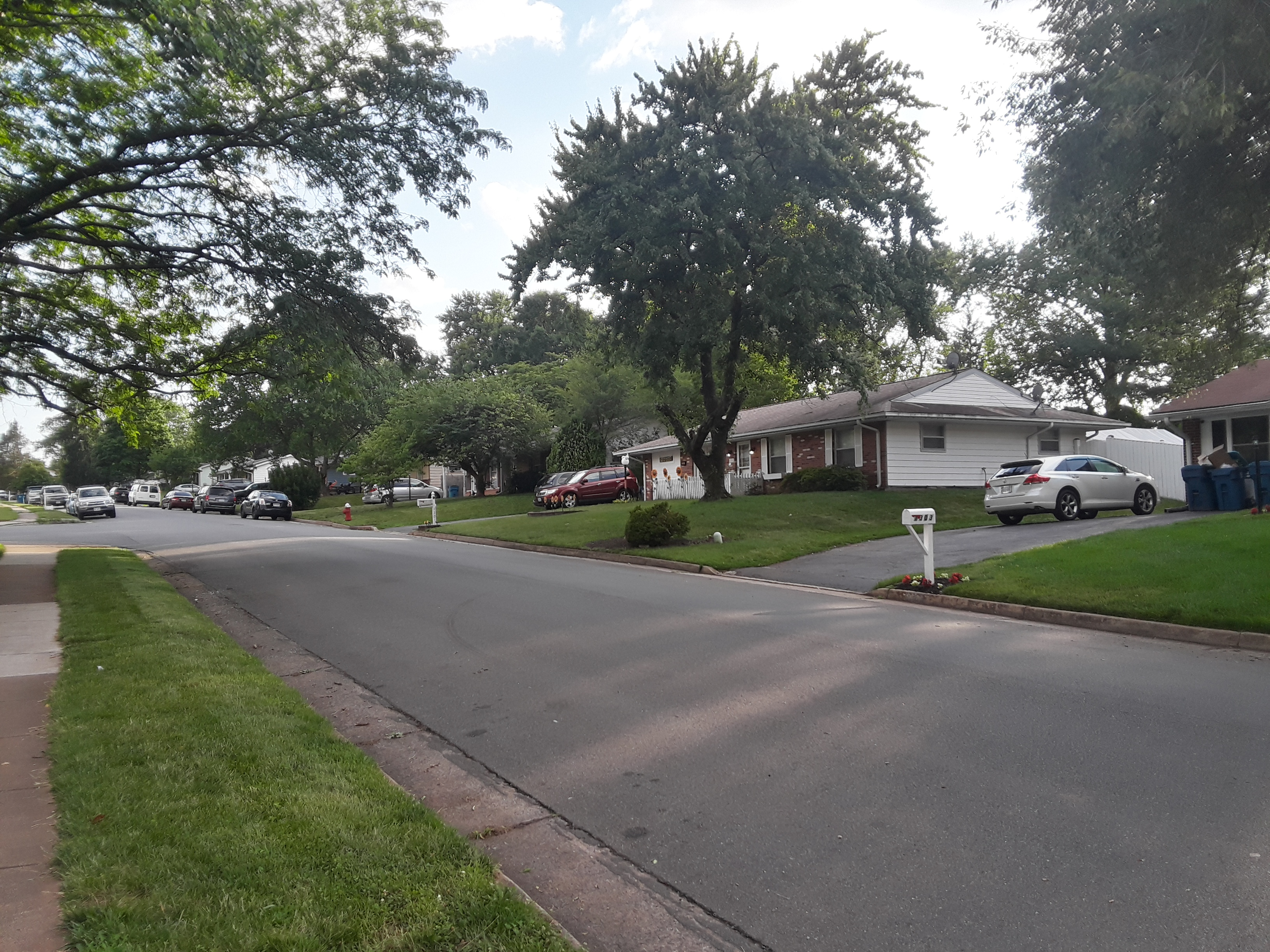
- Houses in the Sterling Park neighborhood, June 2023

- Location within Northern Virginia Location within Virginia Location within the United States
- Coordinates: 39°0′22″N 77°25′43″W
- Country: United States
- State: Virginia
- County: Loudoun

Area
  - Total: 5.48 sq mi (14.19 km^{2})
  - Land: 5.45 sq mi (14.12 km^{2})
  - Water: 0.027 sq mi (0.07 km^{2})
- Elevation: 295 ft (90 m)

Population (2020)
  - Total: 30,337
  - Density: 5,565/sq mi (2,148.5/km^{2})
- Time zone: UTC−5 (Eastern (EST))
  - Summer (DST): UTC−4 (EDT)
- ZIP code: 20164-66
- FIPS code: 51-75376
- GNIS feature ID: 2584925

Sterling refers most specifically to a census-designated place (CDP) in Loudoun County, Virginia. The population of the CDP as of the 2020 United States Census was 30,337. The CDP boundaries are confined to an area between Virginia State Route 28 on the west and Virginia State Route 7 on the northeast, excluding areas near SR 606 and the Dulles Town Center.

== Etymology ==
The name Sterling was adopted in 1887 after several changes to the village’s name. Originally, the area was known as Guilford and later Loudoun. The post office, established in the mid-1800s, was initially named Guilford Station. As the railroad expanded, the name Loudoun was used briefly to denote the village, due to being situated next to the "Loudoun" station. This proved confusing especially as Loudoun County communities began to develop further into the county passed Sterling. In 1887, the name was officially changed to Sterling to avoid this confusion. The choice of the name Sterling was linked to historical references to Norman pennies (sterlings) from the 11th and 12th centuries. These coins were widely known for their value and quality, and the term later evolved to represent the British currency, the pound sterling.

== History ==
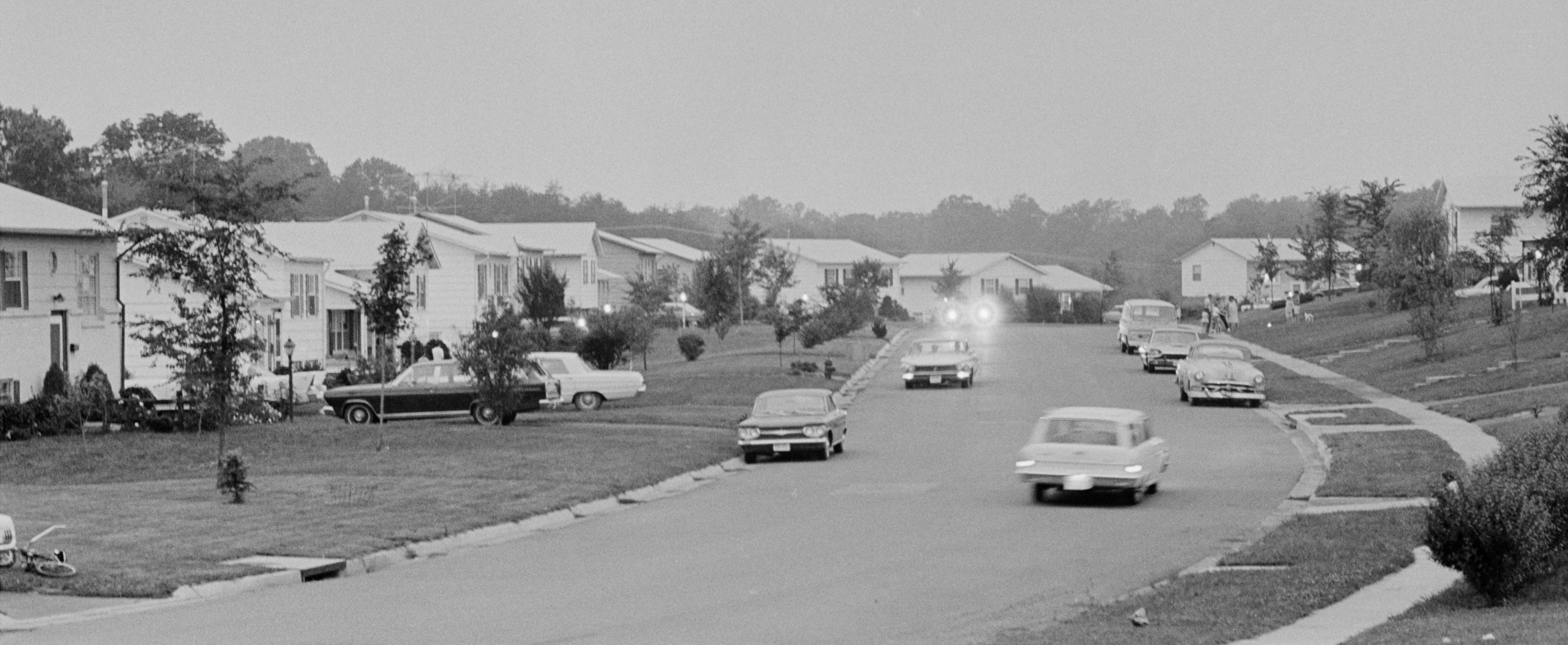
A Sterling Park street in 1967

In 1962, large farms made up the 1,762 acres (713 ha) of what today is called Sterling Park. Route 7, also known as Leesburg Pike, bordered what used to be Jesse Hughes's dairy farm. Hughes arrived in Loudoun County in the early 20th century and was a longtime head of the county's Democrats. Fred Franklin Tavenner, who was somewhat related to Benjamin Franklin, operated vast stretches of Sterling Farm at the southwest fringes of Sterling Park. Tavenner had purchased land from Albert Shaw Jr., who had inherited it from his father Albert B. Shaw, editor and publisher of the American Review of Reviews. One of Shaw's spreads, totaling 1,640 acres (660 ha), was called "The Experimental Farm" because it was one of the first area farms to receive a U.S. grant for applying "scientific methods", as Tavenner called them. According to Tavenner, refugees from the Soviet Union ran the farm while Shaw remained in New York City.

Dulles International Airport and the extension of water and sewer lines to the airport began to change the landscape when construction started in 1959. Land prices rose from an average $125 per acre ($310/ha) to $500 per acre ($1,200/ha). During the same year, Marvin T. Broyhill Jr. and his father made plans to develop land in the airport area under the company M.T. Broyhill & Sons Corporation. In late 1961, they decided to buy and incorporated Sterling Park Development Corporation with his son Marvin T. Broyhill as president, and cousin Thomas J. Broyhill as vice president. Between April 28 and December 29 of 1961, they purchased 1,762 acres (713 ha) in 14 parcels for $2,115,784. For the 226-acre (91 ha) Hughes farm along Route 7, they paid $1,700 per acre ($4,200/ha).

M.T. Broyhill & Sons Corporation learned where the right-of-way for Route 28 (Sully Road) would be, and hoped to develop Sterling Park on both sides of it, so they would not have to build a road through Sterling Park. However, Powell B. Harrison, who was instrumental in planning Route 28, insisted that the road be kept generally free of development, for easy access to the airport. Therefore, the Broyhills developed Sterling Park east of Route 28, and had to build their own through road, today's Sterling Boulevard.

Marvin Broyhill, Jr.'s marketing thoughts were to "put together a prefabricated home marketed by U.S. Steel and sell it for about $17,000 [that is] $3,000 less than a comparable residence in Fairfax County, Virginia. . . All homes to have air conditioning. Homeowners to have access without membership fees to golf and tennis courts and pools." Air conditioning was uncommon in homes of that price range at the time. Broyhill's ideas, except for free golf, are realities today. As selling points, Loudoun's taxes were less than half of Fairfax's taxes, Washington was a half-hour away, and the elder Broyhill had envisioned commuter trains on the Washington and Old Dominion Railroad (which, since 1951, had carried only freight). The railroad tracks were the southern boundary of the present Sterling Park.

Sterling Park residents had to be of the "Caucasian race." No board member or speaker before the board raised an objection to the clause, a common one in the United States before the 1960s, when discriminatory housing was outlawed by the Fair Housing Act, which was enacted as a follow-up to the Civil Rights Act of 1964. No African American family moved into Sterling Park until August 1966, when the illegality of the clause became apparent. By then, the population of "The Park", as it had come to be known, had reached 5,000.

The Broad Run Bridge and Tollhouse, Vestal's Gap Road and Lanesville Historic District, and Arcola Elementary School are listed on the National Register of Historic Places.

== Geography ==
Sterling is part of the Chesapeake Bay watershed.

=== Climate ===
The climate in this area is characterized by hot, humid summers and generally mild to cool winters. According to the Köppen Climate Classification system, Sterling has a humid subtropical climate, abbreviated "Cfa" on climate maps.

Climate data for Dulles International Airport in Sterling, Virginia (1991−2020 normals, (Note: Mean monthly maxima and minima (i.e. the expected highest and lowest temperature readings at any point during the year or given month) calculated based on data at said location from 1991 to 2020.) extremes 1960−present)
Month	Jan	Feb	Mar	Apr	May	Jun	Jul	Aug	Sep	Oct	Nov	Dec	Year
Record high °F (°C)	79 (26)	80 (27)	89 (32)	93 (34)	97 (36)	102 (39)	105 (41)	104 (40)	100 (38)	96 (36)	84 (29)	79 (26)	105 (41)
Mean maximum °F (°C)	65.6 (18.7)	67.1 (19.5)	76.5 (24.7)	85.8 (29.9)	89.9 (32.2)	94.1 (34.5)	96.7 (35.9)	95.4 (35.2)	91.3 (32.9)	84.4 (29.1)	74.4 (23.6)	66.1 (18.9)	97.7 (36.5)
Mean daily maximum °F (°C)	42.6 (5.9)	46.1 (7.8)	54.8 (12.7)	66.8 (19.3)	75.0 (23.9)	83.1 (28.4)	87.6 (30.9)	86.3 (30.2)	79.3 (26.3)	67.8 (19.9)	56.5 (13.6)	46.5 (8.1)	66.0 (18.9)
Daily mean °F (°C)	33.9 (1.1)	36.4 (2.4)	44.2 (6.8)	55.0 (12.8)	64.0 (17.8)	72.5 (22.5)	77.2 (25.1)	75.7 (24.3)	68.6 (20.3)	56.6 (13.7)	46.0 (7.8)	37.7 (3.2)	55.7 (13.2)
Mean daily minimum °F (°C)	25.2 (−3.8)	26.7 (−2.9)	33.6 (0.9)	43.2 (6.2)	53.0 (11.7)	61.9 (16.6)	66.8 (19.3)	65.2 (18.4)	57.9 (14.4)	45.3 (7.4)	35.6 (2.0)	29.0 (−1.7)	45.3 (7.4)
Mean minimum °F (°C)	6.6 (−14.1)	9.6 (−12.4)	16.8 (−8.4)	27.8 (−2.3)	37.0 (2.8)	48.3 (9.1)	55.4 (13.0)	54.4 (12.4)	43.0 (6.1)	29.9 (−1.2)	20.6 (−6.3)	13.4 (−10.3)	3.8 (−15.7)
Record low °F (°C)	−18 (−28)	−14 (−26)	−1 (−18)	17 (−8)	28 (−2)	36 (2)	41 (5)	38 (3)	30 (−1)	15 (−9)	9 (−13)	−4 (−20)	−18 (−28)
Average precipitation inches (mm)	2.94 (75)	2.61 (66)	3.50 (89)	3.47 (88)	4.72 (120)	4.30 (109)	4.15 (105)	3.53 (90)	3.94 (100)	3.65 (93)	3.13 (80)	3.30 (84)	43.24 (1,098)
Average snowfall inches (cm)	6.9 (18)	7.0 (18)	3.9 (9.9)	0.1 (0.25)	0.0 (0.0)	0.0 (0.0)	0.0 (0.0)	0.0 (0.0)	0.0 (0.0)	0.0 (0.0)	0.3 (0.76)	2.8 (7.1)	21.0 (53)
Average extreme snow depth inches (cm)	4.3 (11)	4.3 (11)	2.5 (6.4)	0.0 (0.0)	0.0 (0.0)	0.0 (0.0)	0.0 (0.0)	0.0 (0.0)	0.0 (0.0)	0.0 (0.0)	0.1 (0.25)	1.9 (4.8)	7.5 (19)
Average precipitation days (≥ 0.01 in)	10.3	9.1	11.0	11.0	12.7	10.8	11.0	9.3	9.0	8.1	8.6	10.2	121.1
Average snowy days (≥ 0.1 in)	3.1	2.9	1.8	0.1	0.0	0.0	0.0	0.0	0.0	0.0	0.2	1.6	9.7
Average relative humidity (%)	68.1	66.0	63.9	62.6	70.4	72.3	73.0	74.8	75.4	73.0	70.0	69.6	69.9
Average dew point °F (°C)	20.7 (−6.3)	22.3 (−5.4)	30.2 (−1.0)	38.7 (3.7)	51.4 (10.8)	60.6 (15.9)	64.9 (18.3)	64.0 (17.8)	57.6 (14.2)	45.0 (7.2)	35.1 (1.7)	25.7 (−3.5)	43.0 (6.1)
Source: National Weather Service (relative humidity and dew point 1961–1990)

== Demographics ==
Historical population
Census	Pop.	Note	%±
2010	27,822		—
2020	30,337		9.0%
U.S. Decennial Census; 2010 2020

Sterling was first listed as a census designated place in the 2010 U.S. census.

=== Racial and ethnic composition ===
Sterling, Virginia – Racial and Ethnic Composition (NH = Non-Hispanic) Note: the US Census treats Hispanic/Latino as an ethnic category. This table excludes Latinos from the racial categories and assigns them to a separate category. Hispanics/Latinos may be of any race.
Race / Ethnicity	Pop 2010	Pop 2020	% 2010	% 2020
White alone (NH)	11,631	9,025	41.81%	29.75%
Black or African American alone (NH)	2,149	2,080	7.72%	6.86%
Native American or Alaska Native alone (NH)	46	32	0.17%	0.11%
Asian alone (NH)	3,897	4,414	14.01%	14.55%
Pacific Islander alone (NH)	17	8	0.06%	0.03%
Some Other Race alone (NH)	110	231	0.4%	0.76%
Mixed Race/Multi-Racial (NH)	742	1,050	2.67%	3.46%
Hispanic or Latino (any race)	9,230	13,497	33.18%	44.49%
Total	27,822	30,337	100%	100%

=== 2020 census ===
As of the 2020 census, Sterling had a population of 30,337. The median age was 35.6 years. 24.5% of residents were under the age of 18 and 10.7% of residents were 65 years of age or older. For every 100 females there were 102.9 males, and for every 100 females age 18 and over there were 101.8 males age 18 and over.

100.0% of residents lived in urban areas, while 0.0% lived in rural areas.

There were 9,339 households in Sterling, of which 38.2% had children under the age of 18 living in them. Of all households, 52.7% were married-couple households, 17.6% were households with a male householder and no spouse or partner present, and 23.1% were households with a female householder and no spouse or partner present. About 20.7% of all households were made up of individuals and 7.5% had someone living alone who was 65 years of age or older.

There were 9,609 housing units, of which 2.8% were vacant. The homeowner vacancy rate was 0.5% and the rental vacancy rate was 5.8%.

Racial composition as of the 2020 census
Race	Number	Percent
White	10,451	34.4%
Black or African American	2,176	7.2%
American Indian and Alaska Native	339	1.1%
Asian	4,447	14.7%
Native Hawaiian and Other Pacific Islander	14	0.0%
Some other race	8,026	26.5%
Two or more races	4,884	16.1%
Hispanic or Latino (of any race)	13,497	44.5%

=== 2022 American Community Survey estimates ===
As of the 2022 American Community Survey estimates, there were 31,058 people and 9,659 households. The population density was 5,694.5 inhabitants per square mile (2,198.7/km^{2}). There were 9,956 housing units at an average density of 1,825.4 units per square mile (704.8 units/km^{2}). The racial makeup of the city was 42.0% White, 22.1% some other race, 15.2% Asian, 6.6% Black or African American, 0.5% Native American or Alaskan Native, and 0.1% Native Hawaiian or Other Pacific Islander, with 13.4% from two or more races. Hispanics or Latinos of any race were 47.1% of the population.

Of the 9,659 households, 40.8% had children under the age of 18 living with them, 24.9% had seniors 65 years or older living with them, 56.6% were married couples living together, 4.5% were couples cohabitating, 15.9% had a male householder with no partner present, and 23.1% had a female householder with no partner present. The median household size was 3.21 and the median family size was 3.65.

The age distribution was 24.1% under 18, 11.2% from 18 to 24, 31.3% from 25 to 44, 22.8% from 45 to 64, and 10.6% who were 65 or older. The median age was 35.4 years. For every 100 females, there were 104.3 males.

The median income for a household was $117,699, with family households having a median income of $128,241 and non-family households $76,526. The per capita income was $44,054. Males working full-time jobs had median earnings of $64,685 compared to $55,864 for females. Out of the 30,861 people with a determined poverty status, 7.4% were below the poverty line. Further, 7.5% of minors and 11.3% of seniors were below the poverty line.

In the survey, residents self-identified with various ethnic ancestries. People of German descent made up 6.0% of the population of the town, followed by Irish at 5.1%, English at 4.9%, American at 4.7%, Italian at 2.3%, Arab at 1.9%, French at 1.2%, Sub-Saharan African at 1.1%, Polish at 0.9%, Scottish at 0.8%, Caribbean (excluding Hispanics) at 0.6%, and Greek at 0.5%.

== Economy ==
Companies with annual revenues of $20 million or more, and that have headquarters in Sterling, include Neustar and Electronic Instrumentation and Technology. Companies that have a branch office or headquarters in Sterling, with a total number of employees over 1,000 or more, include Alcatel-Lucent, Geo Trans, HR Solutions LLC, M.C. Dean, Inc., National Electronics Warranty Corp, N E W Customer Service Companies Inc, and Orbital Science.

Federal agencies with offices in Sterling include U.S. Customs and Border Protection, the Bureau of Safety and Environmental Enforcement, and the Drug Enforcement Administration.

Atlantic Coast Airlines previously had its headquarters in Sterling.

== Parks and recreation ==
Claude Moore Park occupies 357 acres (144 ha) in Sterling and features an indoor pool, gymnasium, sports fields, hiking trails and a park. The last known undeveloped section of Vestal's Gap Road runs across the park. Originally a trail first used by Native Americans, it was a major route for settlers between Alexandria and the Shenandoah Valley. George Washington used the road frequently in his travels between Mount Vernon and the western frontier. General Braddock's troops, including Daniel Boone, traveled Vestal's Gap Road during the French and Indian War.

Other recreation areas include Algonkian Regional Park, Dulles Golf Center and Sports Park, and Sterling Golf Club.

== Education ==
Public high schools in Sterling include Dominion High School, Park View High School, and Potomac Falls High School.

Middle schools include River Bend Middle School, Seneca Ridge Middle School, and Sterling Middle School.

Elementary schools include: Algonkian Elementary School, Countryside Elementary School, Forest Grove Elementary School, Guilford Elementary School, Horizon Elementary School, Lowes Island Elementary School, Meadlowland Elementary School, Potowmack Elementary School, Rolling Ridge Elementary School, Sterling Elementary School, Sugarland Elementary School, and Sully Elementary School.

=== Higher education ===
Northern Virginia Community College has a Loudoun Campus in Sterling.

== Transportation ==
=== Highways ===
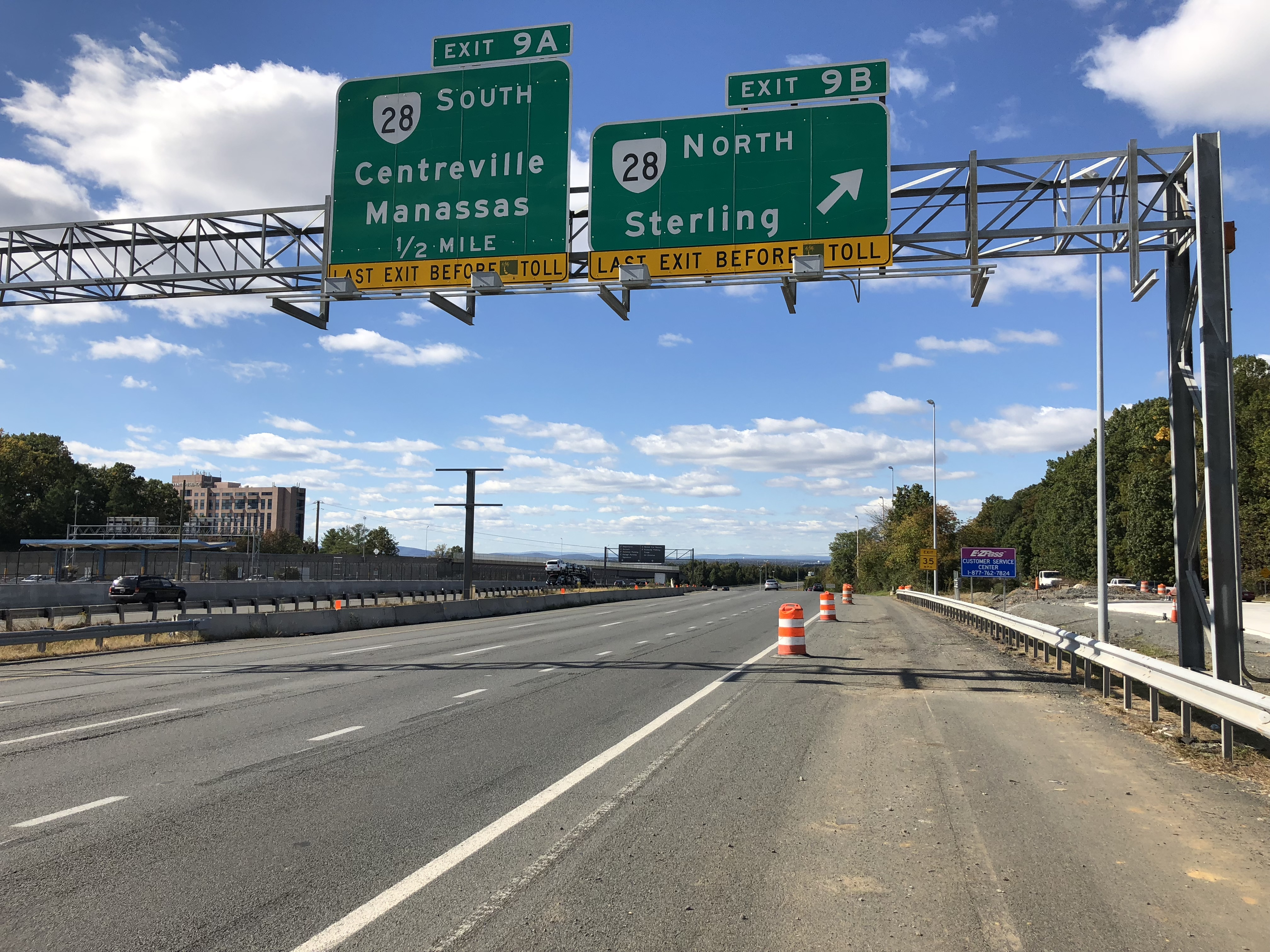
State Route 28 Exit 9B onto Sully Road toward Sterling

Virginia State Route 28 and Leesburg Pike serve Sterling. Leesburg Pike and Route 28 interchange in Sterling.

=== Public transportation ===
The Loudoun Gateway Metrorail station is located in Sterling. The station has a kiss and ride, bus bays, a parking lot and garage, and bike racks. The Dulles North Transit Center was located nearby.

The Dulles North Transit Center was a bus terminal located near the town. It was operated by Loudoun County Transit. The station closed on December 5, 2022 and the busses were moved to the Dulles Transit Center, a new transport hub also operated by Loudoun County Transit, located at 23200 Pacific Boulevard. The Dulles Transit Center had 3 bus bays, bus shelters, benches, bike lockers, and 1,167 parking spots with 23 ADA compliant.

On April 1, 2026, busses from the Dulles Transit Center relocated to Loudoun Gateway Metro station, however the former was kept open for vanpooling and carpooling. This was implemented for better transit connections and free parking in the station's parking garage by use of a SmarTrip card.

== Emergency services ==
Fire protection is provided by the Sterling Volunteer Fire Company. Technical Rescue and Emergency Medical Services are provided by the Sterling Volunteer Rescue Squad. Both are part of the Loudoun County Combined Fire and Rescue System, and share three stations.

The Loudoun County Sheriff's Office and the Virginia State Police provide law enforcement.

== Notable people ==
- James Buchanan, 15th President of the United States, had a summer home near what is now Ruritan Circle.
- Hilarie Burton, actress from the television programs One Tree Hill and White Collar
- Jalen Coker, NFL wide receiver
- Billy King, former general manager for the Brooklyn Nets of the NBA
- Patton Oswalt, stand-up comedian
- Pg. 99, a screamo band formed in 1999
- Stuart C. Satterwhite, United States Navy rear admiral
- Conor Shanosky, a former United States men's national under-20 soccer team player, who operated commonly as midfielder and defender; formerly a D.C. United player and currently plays for the Richmond Kickers
- Austin St. John, actor and martial artist from the Mighty Morphin Power Rangers television series, who left acting to work as a paramedic and study martial arts
- Dondrea Tillman, NFL outside linebacker
- Cameron Whitten, community activist

== See also ==
- Willard, Virginia, adjacent village displaced for construction of Dulles Airport
- Algonkian Writers Conference, at Algonkian Park in Sterling
