= Jack Dale =

Jack Dale may refer to:

- Jack Dale (coach) (1904–1975), American football and basketball coach
- Jack Dale (ice hockey) (1945–2026), American ice hockey player
- Jack Dale (cricketer) (1901–1965), English cricketer
- Jack D. Dale, superintendent of Fairfax County Public Schools, Virginia

== See also ==
- John Dale (disambiguation)
