= Centreville, Virginia =

Census-designated place in Virginia, United States

Centreville
- Census-designated Place (CDP)
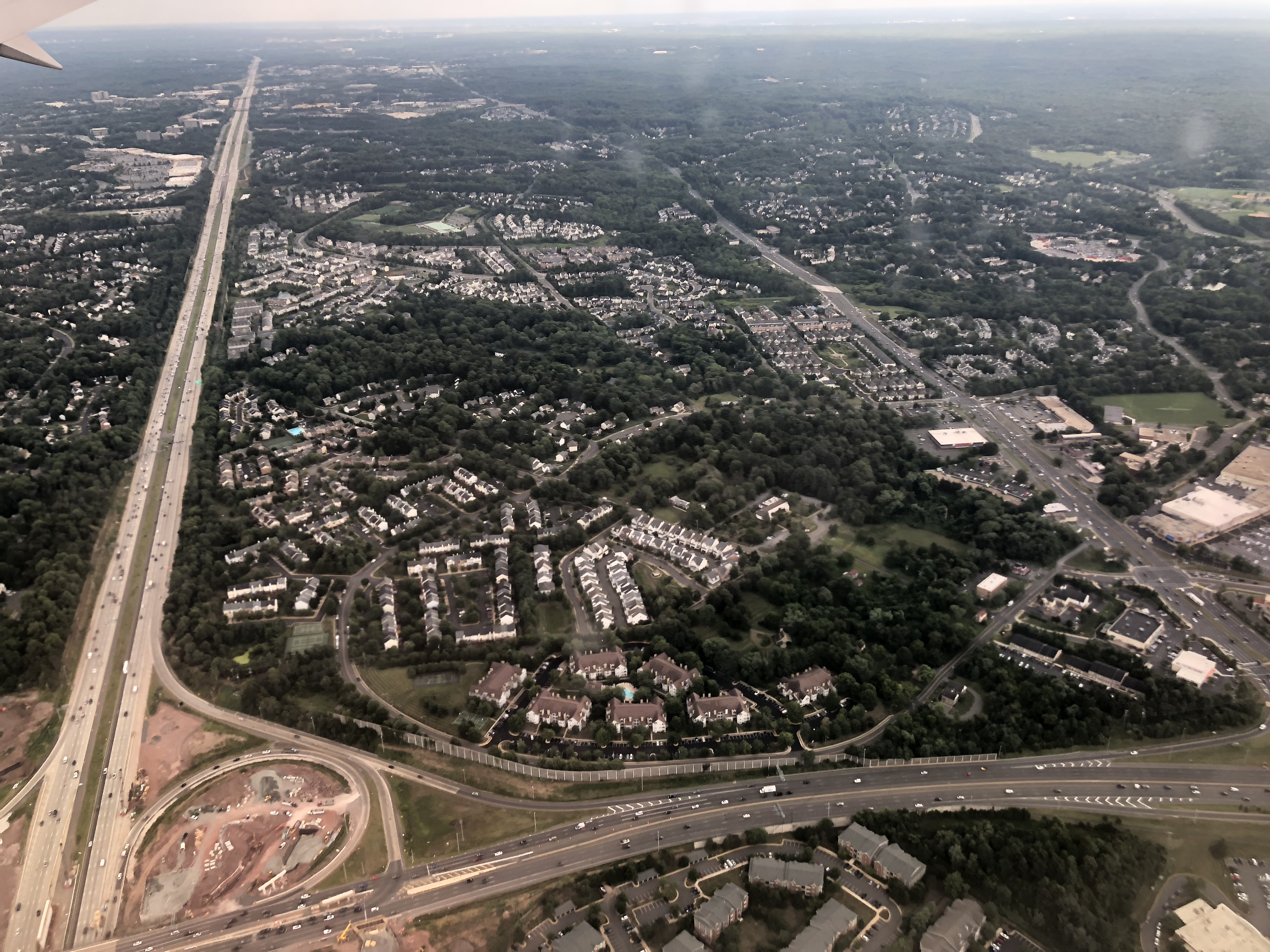
- An aerial view of SR 28 (bottom), I-66 (left) and US 29 (right) in Centreville in July 2019

- Location of Centreville in Fairfax County, Virginia

- Location within Northern Virginia Location within Virginia Location within the United States
- Coordinates: 38°50′33″N 77°26′33″W
- Country: United States
- State: Virginia
- County: Fairfax

Area
  - Census-designated Place (CDP): 12.05 sq mi (31.2 km^{2})
  - Land: 11.94 sq mi (30.9 km^{2})
  - Water: .11 sq mi (0.28 km^{2})
- Elevation: 384 ft (117 m)

Population (2020)
  - Census-designated Place (CDP): 73,518
  - Density: 6,157/sq mi (2,377/km^{2})
  - Urban: 4,586,770
  - Metro: 6,385,162
- Time zone: UTC-5 (EST)
  - Summer (DST): UTC-4 (EDT)
- ZIP Codes: 20120-20122
- Area codes: 703, 571
- FIPS code: 51-14440
- GNIS feature ID: 1491083

Centreville is a census-designated place (CDP) in Fairfax County, Virginia, United States. It is a suburb of Washington, D.C., the nation's capital. As of the 2020 census, Centreville had a population of 73,518, making it the most-populous community in Fairfax County.

Centreville is approximately 20 miles (32 km) west of Washington, D.C.

== History ==
=== Colonial period ===
Beginning in the 1760s, the area was known as Newgate due to the popularity of the conveniently located Newgate tavern. William Carr Lane operated the tavern and was co-proprietor of a nearby store with James Lane, Jr. The Lanes sold convicted servants, which may explain why the tavern had the same name as a London prison. The small stream that passed near the tavern was named the River Thames, another London association. Another reason for it being named Newgate was that it was a "new gate" to the western territories.

=== 18th century ===
The town of Centerville, shortly later spelled Centreville, was established in 1792 on the turnpike road at the village of Newgate by the Virginia General Assembly in response to petitions by local landowners. The petitioners reasoned that a town on the turnpike road leading from the Northwest Territory and centrally located to Alexandria, Colchester, Dumfries, Middleburg, George Town (later Georgetown), Fauquier Court House (later Warrenton), and Leesburg would be convenient. The town acquired its name due to its central location. James Hardage Lane, one of the landowners, conceived the idea of the town as a way to provide financial support to his widow and their children. At the town's inception, it was within the boundary of Loudoun County, Virginia, and became part of Fairfax County, Virginia, in 1798 when the boundary between the two counties shifted.

Town development established a pattern of mixed residential and commercial use. Frame houses, several taverns, stores, blacksmith shops, tan yards, and a school house were constructed on the 1/2-acre town lots.

==== American Civil War ====
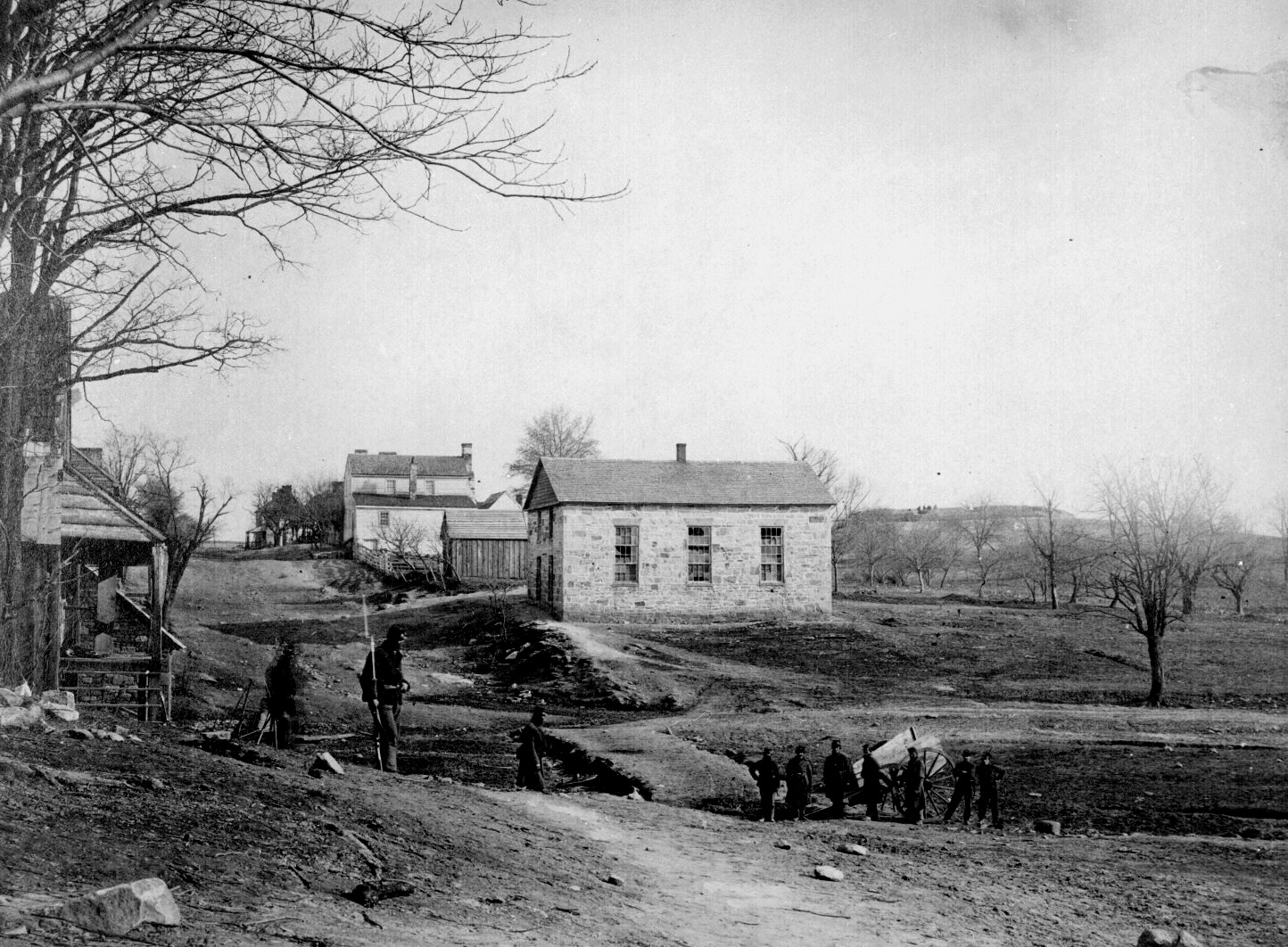
Main street and church guarded by Union Army in Centreville, in May 1862 at the beginning of the American Civil War

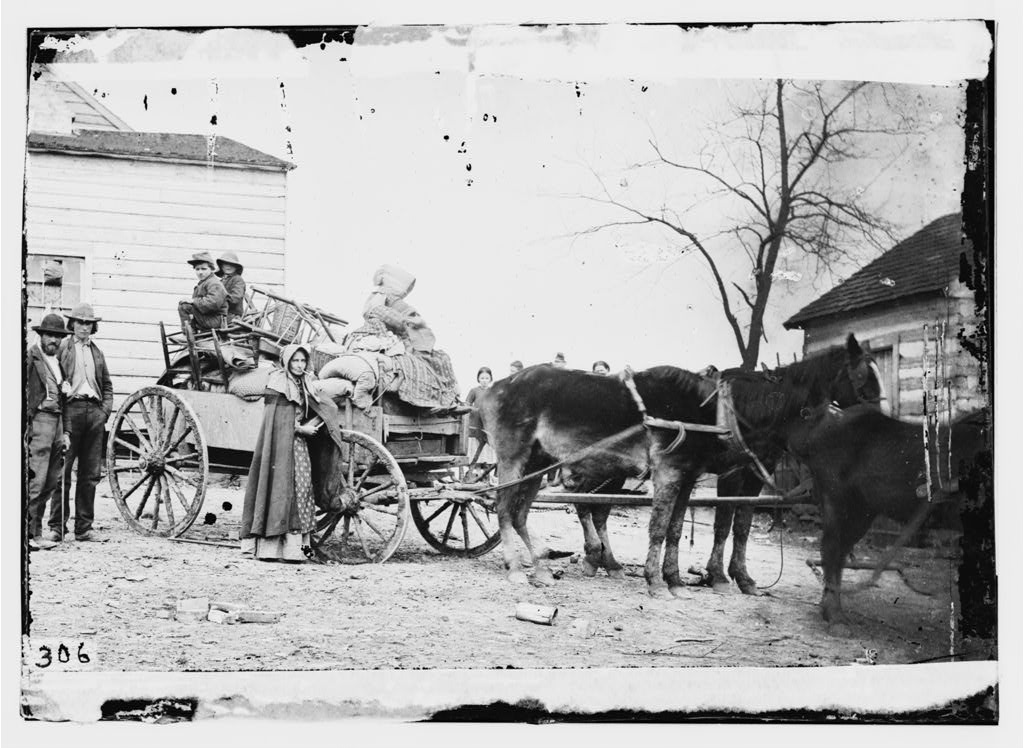
Departure from the old Homestead, an 1862 photograph depicting pro-Union refugees

In the American Civil War, several battles were fought nearby including the First Battle of Manassas, the Second Battle of Manassas, and the Battle of Chantilly.

During the winter of 1861 and early 1862 the town was significantly fortified by the Confederacy and served as a supply depot for both sides at various points in the war, and is famous for being the site of the construction of the first railroad ever built exclusively for military use, the Centreville Military Railroad. Centreville was of significant strategic value due to its proximity to several important roads, while its position atop a high ridge provided a commanding view of the surrounding area. The town was frequently associated with Confederate Colonel John S. Mosby, whose partisan rangers used its hillsides and farms as a base of operations, leading to the sobriquet "Mosby's Confederacy".

=== 20th and 21st centuries ===
Like much of Northern Virginia, Centreville experienced sustained population growth in the 1990s and 2000s. In 2021, the town has grown significantly. There are numerous shopping centers built around the town center.

== Geography ==
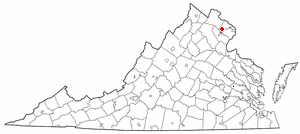
Location of Centreville, Virginia

Centreville is located at 38°50′33″N 77°26′33″W (38.842470, −77.442621).

According to the United States Census Bureau (2010), the CDP has a total area of 12.04 square miles (31.2 km^{2}), 99% of it land.

== Climate ==
Like Washington D.C., Centreville features a mid-latitude, four seasons version of the humid subtropical climate (Köppen: Cfa), typical of the Mid-Atlantic region, including strong hot-summer humid continental climate (Köppen: Dfa) influences under the Köppen system. Winters are chilly and damp, with frost at night and some snow, while summers are hot and wet, with subtropical temperatures although these temperatures are hardly more bearable than in the south.

Climate data for Washington, D.C. (Reagan National Airport), 1991−2020 normals, (Note: Mean monthly maxima and minima (i.e. the expected highest and lowest temperature readings at any point during the year or given month) calculated based on data at said location from 1991 to 2020.) extremes 1872−present (Note: Official records for Washington, D.C. were kept at 24th and M Streets NW from January 1872 to June 1945, and at Reagan National Airport since July 1945.)
Month	Jan	Feb	Mar	Apr	May	Jun	Jul	Aug	Sep	Oct	Nov	Dec	Year
Record high °F (°C)	79 (26)	84 (29)	93 (34)	95 (35)	99 (37)	104 (40)	106 (41)	106 (41)	104 (40)	98 (37)	86 (30)	79 (26)	106 (41)
Mean maximum °F (°C)	66.7 (19.3)	68.1 (20.1)	77.3 (25.2)	86.4 (30.2)	91.0 (32.8)	95.7 (35.4)	98.1 (36.7)	96.5 (35.8)	91.9 (33.3)	84.5 (29.2)	74.8 (23.8)	67.1 (19.5)	99.1 (37.3)
Mean daily maximum °F (°C)	44.8 (7.1)	48.3 (9.1)	56.5 (13.6)	68.0 (20.0)	76.5 (24.7)	85.1 (29.5)	89.6 (32.0)	87.8 (31.0)	80.7 (27.1)	69.4 (20.8)	58.2 (14.6)	48.8 (9.3)	67.8 (19.9)
Daily mean °F (°C)	37.5 (3.1)	40.0 (4.4)	47.6 (8.7)	58.2 (14.6)	67.2 (19.6)	76.3 (24.6)	81.0 (27.2)	79.4 (26.3)	72.4 (22.4)	60.8 (16.0)	49.9 (9.9)	41.7 (5.4)	59.3 (15.2)
Mean daily minimum °F (°C)	30.1 (−1.1)	31.8 (−0.1)	38.6 (3.7)	48.4 (9.1)	58.0 (14.4)	67.5 (19.7)	72.4 (22.4)	71.0 (21.7)	64.1 (17.8)	52.2 (11.2)	41.6 (5.3)	34.5 (1.4)	50.9 (10.5)
Mean minimum °F (°C)	14.3 (−9.8)	16.9 (−8.4)	23.4 (−4.8)	34.9 (1.6)	45.5 (7.5)	55.7 (13.2)	63.8 (17.7)	62.1 (16.7)	51.3 (10.7)	38.7 (3.7)	28.8 (−1.8)	21.3 (−5.9)	12.3 (−10.9)
Record low °F (°C)	−14 (−26)	−15 (−26)	4 (−16)	15 (−9)	33 (1)	43 (6)	52 (11)	49 (9)	36 (2)	26 (−3)	11 (−12)	−13 (−25)	−15 (−26)
Average precipitation inches (mm)	2.86 (73)	2.62 (67)	3.50 (89)	3.21 (82)	3.94 (100)	4.20 (107)	4.33 (110)	3.25 (83)	3.93 (100)	3.66 (93)	2.91 (74)	3.41 (87)	41.82 (1,062)
Average snowfall inches (cm)	4.9 (12)	5.0 (13)	2.0 (5.1)	0.0 (0.0)	0.0 (0.0)	0.0 (0.0)	0.0 (0.0)	0.0 (0.0)	0.0 (0.0)	0.0 (0.0)	0.1 (0.25)	1.7 (4.3)	13.7 (35)
Average precipitation days (≥ 0.01 in)	9.7	9.3	11.0	10.8	11.6	10.6	10.5	8.7	8.7	8.3	8.4	10.1	117.7
Average snowy days (≥ 0.1 in)	2.8	2.7	1.1	0.0	0.0	0.0	0.0	0.0	0.0	0.0	0.1	1.3	8.0
Average relative humidity (%)	62.1	60.5	58.6	58.0	64.5	65.8	66.9	69.3	69.7	67.4	64.7	64.1	64.3
Average dew point °F (°C)	21.7 (−5.7)	23.5 (−4.7)	31.3 (−0.4)	39.7 (4.3)	52.3 (11.3)	61.5 (16.4)	66.0 (18.9)	65.8 (18.8)	59.5 (15.3)	47.5 (8.6)	37.0 (2.8)	27.1 (−2.7)	44.4 (6.9)
Mean monthly sunshine hours	144.6	151.8	204.0	228.2	260.5	283.2	280.5	263.1	225.0	203.6	150.2	133.0	2,527.7
Percentage possible sunshine	48	50	55	57	59	64	62	62	60	59	50	45	57
Average ultraviolet index	2	3	5	7	8	9	9	8	7	4	3	2	6
Source 1: NOAA (relative humidity, dew point and sun 1961−1990)
Source 2: Weather Atlas (UV)

== Demographics ==
Historical population
Census	Pop.	Note	%±
1980	7,473		—
1990	26,585		255.7%
2000	48,661		83.0%
2010	71,135		46.2%
2020	73,518		3.3%
U.S. Decennial Census; 1880 1950 1960 1970; 1980 1990 2000; 2010

=== Racial and ethnic composition ===
Centreville CDP, Virginia – Racial and ethnic composition Note: the US Census treats Hispanic/Latino as an ethnic category. This table excludes Latinos from the racial categories and assigns them to a separate category. Hispanics/Latinos may be of any race.
Race / Ethnicity (NH = Non-Hispanic)	Pop 2000	Pop 2010	Pop 2020	% 2000	% 2010	% 2020
White alone (NH)	31,539	35,573	29,997	64.81%	50.01%	40.80%
Black or African American alone (NH)	4,231	5,114	5,488	8.69%	7.19%	7.46%
Native American or Alaska Native alone (NH)	109	111	113	0.22%	0.16%	0.15%
Asian alone (NH)	6,921	18,217	21,976	14.22%	25.61%	29.89%
Native Hawaiian or Pacific Islander alone (NH)	21	78	64	0.04%	0.11%	0.09%
Other race alone (NH)	124	193	421	0.25%	0.27%	0.57%
Mixed race or Multiracial (NH)	1,255	2,351	3,637	2.58%	3.30%	4.95%
Hispanic or Latino (any race)	4,461	9,498	11,822	9.17%	13.35%	16.08%
Total	48,661	71,135	73,518	100.00%	100.00%	100.00%

=== 2020 census ===
As of the 2020 census, Centreville had a population of 73,518, with 25,931 housing units and 25,287 households. The population density was 6,157.3 inhabitants per square mile (2,379.2/km^{2}), and the housing unit density was 2,171.8 per square mile (839.2/km^{2}).

The median age was 36.9 years; 23.1% were under 18 and 9.7% were 65 or older. For every 100 females there were 97.3 males, and for every 100 females age 18 and over there were 95.3 males age 18 and over.

Of the households, 37.5% had children under the age of 18 living in them. 57.6% were married-couple households, 14.8% had a male householder with no spouse or partner present, and 22.6% had a female householder with no spouse or partner present. About 19.3% of all households were made up of individuals and 4.4% had someone living alone who was 65 years of age or older.

The homeowner vacancy rate was 0.4% and the rental vacancy rate was 4.6%, with 2.5% of housing units vacant.

Racial composition as of the 2020 census
Race	Number	Percent
White	31,638	43.0%
Black or African American	5,652	7.7%
American Indian and Alaska Native	368	0.5%
Asian	22,081	30.0%
Native Hawaiian and Other Pacific Islander	66	0.1%
Some other race	5,804	7.9%
Two or more races	7,909	10.8%
Hispanic or Latino (of any race)	11,822	16.1%

100.0% of residents lived in urban areas, while 0.0% lived in rural areas.

=== 2022 American Community Survey ===
According to the 2022 American Community Survey, the largest ancestry was the 10.6% who had English ancestry; 41.0% spoke a language other than English at home, and 33.4% were born outside the United States, 80.1% of whom were naturalized citizens.

The median income for a household in the CDP was $131,444, and the median income for a family was $152,605. 5.0% of the population were military veterans, and 57.2% had a bachelor's degree or higher. In the CDP 5.5% of the population was below the poverty line, including 9.2% of those under age 18 and 2.4% of those age 65 or over, with 6.7% of the population without health insurance.

== Transportation ==
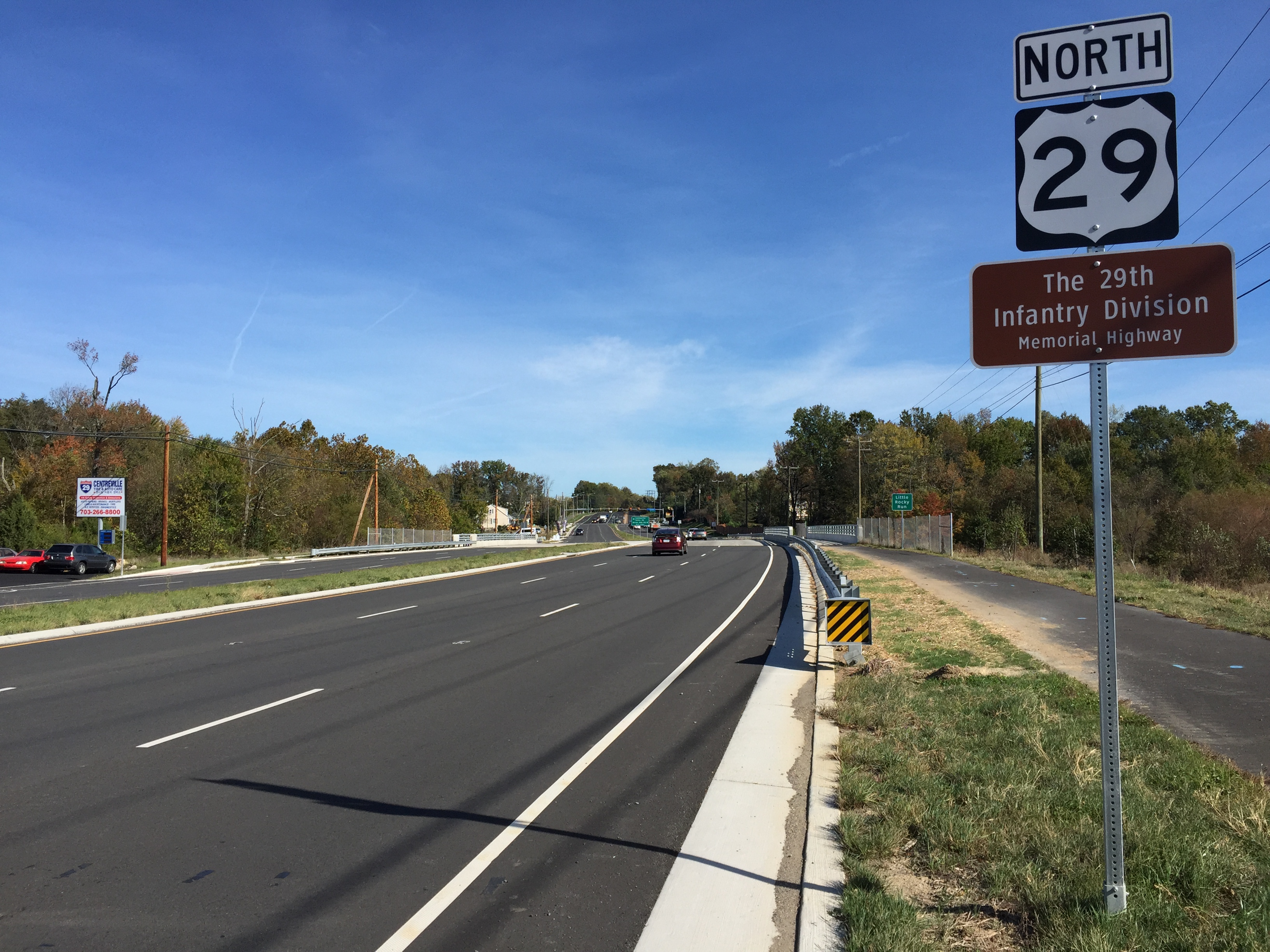
US 29 in Centreville

Centreville is served by three major roads. U.S. Route 29, the main artery through the town, enters Centreville from the west. Virginia Route 28 enters from the south and interchanges with U.S. Route 29 in between Centreville's two main shopping centers. SR 620 (Braddock Road) has several stretches of pavement in Centreville. Interstate 66 comes from the south-west and interchanges with both routes before heading toward Washington, D.C., in the east or western Virginia. The three roads are part of an interesting, if not frustrating traffic pattern. Drivers heading north on SR 28 are able to exit onto Interstate 66 eastbound, but they must use a one-mile (1.6 km) stretch of US 29 to access the westbound side of the Interstate. Likewise, eastbound Interstate 66's Exit 53 only provides access to SR 28 northbound; one must use Exit 52 and the same stretch of US 29 to reach SR 28 south.

The area is served by several Fairfax Connector bus routes connecting to the Metrorail system: 640, 641, 642.

== Notable people ==
- Megan Ambuhl, former U.S. Army soldier connected to Abu Ghraib torture and prisoner abuse
- Chris Beatty, wide receivers coach, Chicago Bears
- Jayson Blair, former New York Times journalist accused of plagiarism
- David L. Brewer III, retired U.S. Navy admiral and former superintendent of Los Angeles Unified School District
- Mike Glennon, American football player
- Sean Glennon, former football player
- Helon Habila, professor and author
- Abul Hussam, inventor of Sono arsenic filter and winner of the Grainger Challenge Prize Gold Award in 2007
- George Juskalian, decorated U.S. Army officer and veteran of World War II, the Vietnam War, and the Korean War
- S.C. Megale, author and screenwriter
- Will Montgomery, former professional football player
- Dustin Pague, professional mixed martial artist
- Ludacris, American rapper and actor; attended Centreville High School for one year
- Eddie Royal, wide receiver for the Chicago Bears; graduated from Westfield High School
- Scott Secules, NFL football player
- Brandon Snyder, MLB 1st round draft pick in 2005 by the Baltimore Orioles; attended Westfield High School
- Ormond Stone, astronomer, mathematician, and educator who founded the Fairfax County Public Library
- Richard Taylor, professional American football player
- William J. Thaler, experimental physicist
- Don Warren, former professional American football player
- Sebra Yen, figure skater

== Education ==
=== Primary and secondary schools ===
Residents of Centreville are zoned to schools in the Fairfax County Public Schools.

Centreville has two middle schools, Liberty Middle School and Ormond Stone Middle School. Some Centreville middle school students also go to Rocky Run Middle School.

Centreville High School, which is located within the postal boundaries of Clifton, serves much of Centreville. Some of Centreville is served by Chantilly High School and by Westfield High School, the latter opening in 2000. Both Chantilly High School and Westfield High School are located in Chantilly.

The only high school still within Centreville proper is Mountain View Alternative High School. It occupies the building formerly used by Centreville Elementary School.

Although a Loudoun County school, Cardinal Ridge Elementary has a Centreville address.

=== Public libraries ===
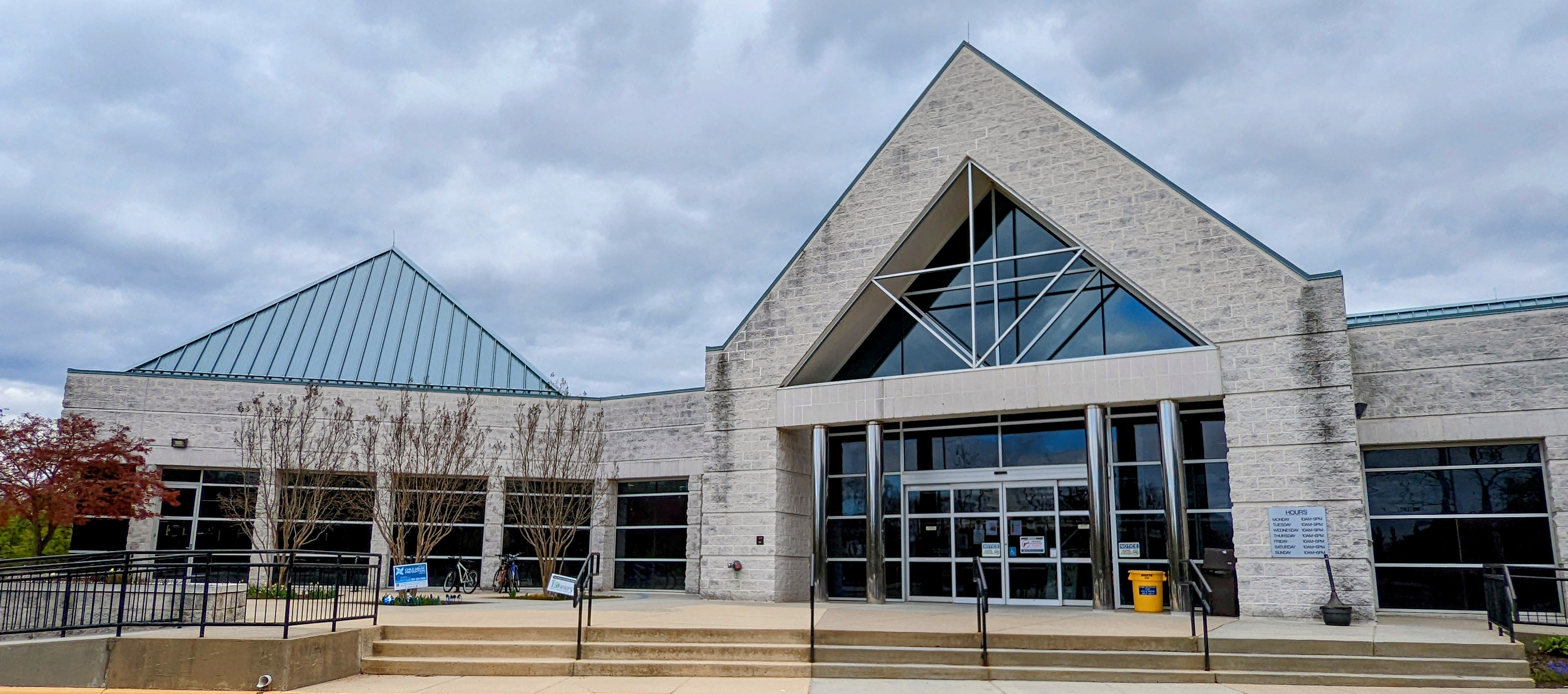
Centreville Regional Library

Fairfax County Public Library operates the Centreville Regional Library in the CDP.

== Nearby towns and communities ==
- Chantilly-South Riding (1 mile NW)
- Clifton (5 miles SE)
- Fair Lakes (4.5 miles E)
- Manassas (6 miles S)
- Oakton (10 miles E)
