= Michael Phares =

American soldier and YouTuber

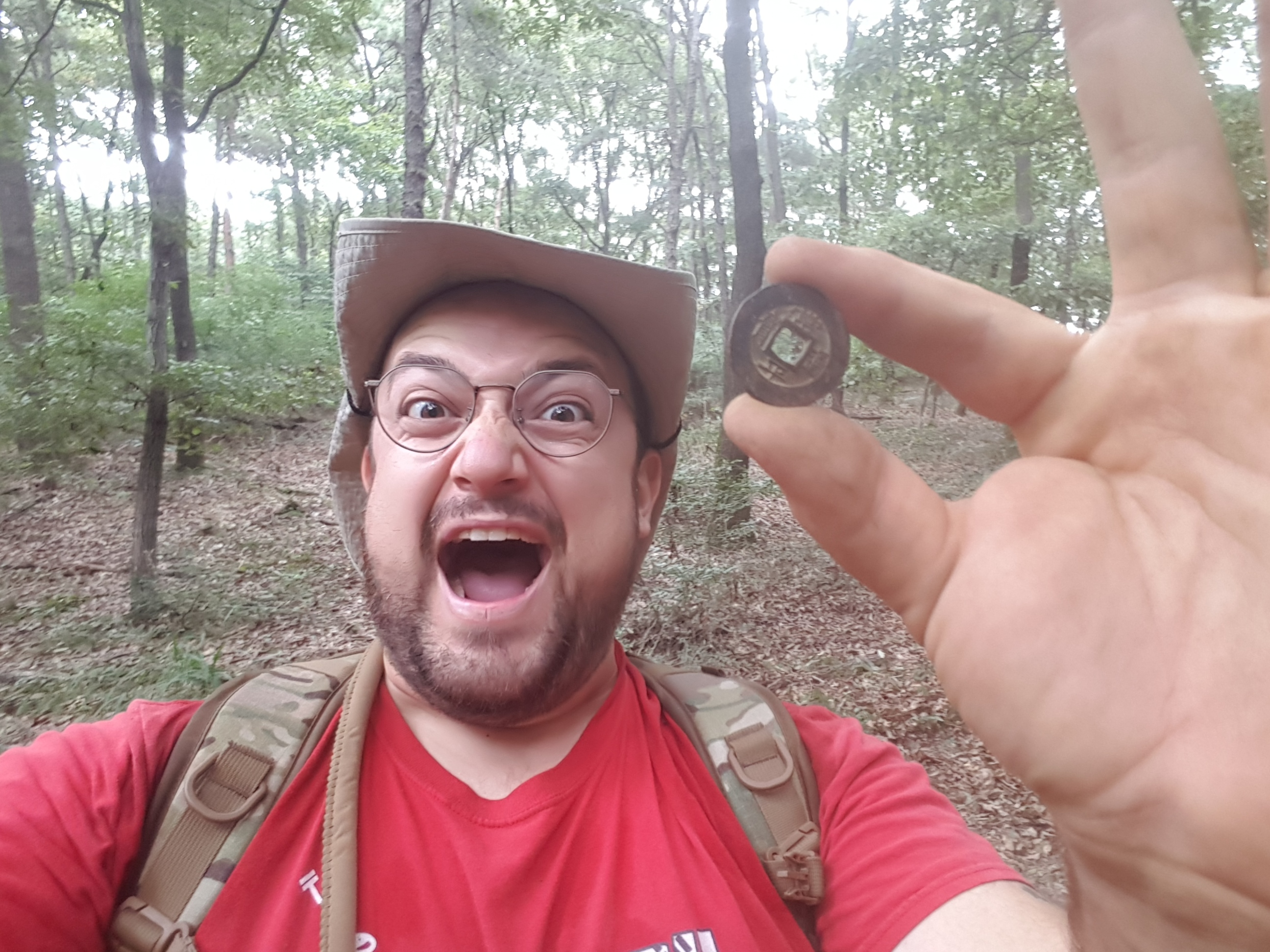
- Phares with a coin (2019)
- Occupations: YouTuber; soldier

YouTube information
- Channel: 미국아재 Mister American
- Genres: Vlog; numismatics
- Subscribers: 528 thousand
- Views: 164 million

Michael Thomas Phares is an American soldier, YouTuber, and amateur numismatist. He operates the Korean-language YouTube channel Mister American (Korean: 미국아재; RR: Miguk Ajae).

== Biography ==
Phares enlisted in the United States Army in 2006. He was first stationed in Germany, and then in 2007 was stationed in South Korea. He reportedly became taken with the Korean language and culture, and won a Korean speaking contest on his base. After finishing his tour in South Korea, he moved back to the United States. He lived in South Korea from 2015 to 2020 and worked as an interpreter for the U.S. Army. During this time, he published videos on his YouTube channel and built his currency collection. By 2022, he lived in Centreville, Virginia. He majored in East Asian history in college.

He is active in collecting, buying, and selling rare currency. According to a video on his channel, he had a collection of over 4,000 coins, worth a total of ₩60 million ($46459.53). His YouTube channel often covers his interest in Korean numismatics—the study of Korean currency. In some of his videos, he demonstrates how he finds old coins in the wild using a metal detector. He has also appeared on television in South Korea on a number of occasions. Phares has four children, who often appear on his channel.
