= Hayden Wilburn Hampton =

Georgian politician

Personal details
- Born: April 25, 1903 Morganton, Fannin County, Georgia
- Died: April 30, 1966 (aged 63)
- Resting place: Ellijay Cemetery, Ellijay, Georgia
- Party: Republican
- Spouse: Minnie Maybell Nichols
- Parent(s): Alice Cordelia (Lefevers) Hampton, Robert Tillman Hampton
- Occupation: Merchant, politician

Hayden Wilburn Hampton was a politician in the state of Georgia.

Hampton was a member of the Georgia House of Representatives for Gilmer County (1933) and the Georgia State Senate (1937-37/38 Ex., 1943).

Hampton was the child of Robert Tillman Hampton, another member of the Georgia House of Representatives (Fannin County, 1931).

== Personal life ==
Hampton married Minnie Maybell Nichols on 1928 October 14. They had three children: Dora Aleece, Marion Frances (who married Lucius Linton Deck, Junior), and Sherry June.
