= Richard Taylor (American football) =

American football player (born 1985)

No. 41
- Position: Cornerback

Personal information
- Born: November 5, 1985 (age 41); Centreville, Virginia
- Listed height: 5 ft 11 in (1.80 m)
- Listed weight: 190 lb (86 kg)

Career information
- College: Maryland
- NFL draft: 2010: undrafted

Career history
- New York Jets (2011)*
- * Offseason or practice squad member only
- Stats at Pro Football Reference

Richard Taylor (born November 5, 1985) is an American former football cornerback. He was signed by the New York Jets as a street free agent in 2011. He played college football at the University of Maryland.

== Early life ==
Taylor played tailback for Centerville High School in Fairfax County, Virginia and led the State in rushing yards during his senior year. He was one of the few ten high school seniors in the country to gray shirt and enrolled early at the University of Maryland. He was also a standout basketball player, averaging over 15 points per game.

== College career ==
He joined the University of Maryland in the Spring Semester, 2004 as a Safety. He was later moved to a Cornerback in 2005. He also joined the Track and Field team in 2006 and 2007. He was one of only four players to letter in two sports during the tenure of Coach Ralph Friedgen. In addition to producing as a football player, he produced top ten all time in the 100-meter dash at the University of Maryland. As a Terp, he played in the Champs Bowl, Emerald Bowl, and Humanitarian Bowl. During pro-day, he posted a record of 30 reps of 225 lbs. in the bench press and also ran a 4.4 in the 40.

Taylor maintained a strong academic performance while playing sports for the Terps. He graduated in three years with a Bachelor of Arts in Communications. After completing his bachelor's degree, he enrolled in the Master's Program in Real Estate Development, reflecting a vision for addressing the broad range of skills and knowledge important in creating viable, attractive and sustainable communities. He completed his master's degree in the Spring of 2009, becoming the first athlete to complete both his bachelor's and master's degrees prior to completing his athletic eligibility.

During his last year as a Maryland football player, he was accepted in the Student Career Experience Program with the Office of Realty of the Federal Highway Administration, U.S. Department of Transportation.

== Professional career ==
Pre-draft measurables
Height	Weight	40-yard dash	10-yard split	20-yard split	20-yard shuttle	Three-cone drill	Vertical jump	Broad jump	Bench press	Wonderlic
5 ft 11 in (1.80 m)	195 lb (88 kg)	4.38 s	1.59 s	2.69 s	4.33 s	7.48 s	36 in (0.91 m)	10 ft 04 in (3.15 m)	30 reps	-
Results taken from Pro Day workout.

Taylor participated in the Detroit Lions minicamp in May 2010 however, he was not signed to a contract.

Taylor signed a future contract with the New York Jets on January 12, 2011. He was waived on August 17.

== Personal ==
He is named after his grandfather, Richard Brown of Edisto Island, South Carolina. He is son of Curtis Taylor, a retired Colonel in the U.S. Army and Abigail Taylor, a retired Speech Pathologist with Fairfax County, Virginia. He has two older brothers: Curtis Taylor, Jr. who played football for Purdue University, Indiana where he was a standout football player; and Steven Taylor, who played football at South Carolina State. He is also the nephew of former three-star Admiral David L. Brewer. He is also a member of the Omega Psi Phi fraternity.
