= Mountain View Alternative High School =

Location
- 5775 Spindle Court; Centreville, Virginia; United States; 38°50′15″N 77°25′32″W

Information
- Type: Public
- Motto: Family, Love, Respect
- Established: 1995
- School district: Fairfax County Public Schools
- Principal: Erin Whatley
- Faculty: 25.0
- Grades: 9 to 12
- Enrollment: 226 (2014-15)
- Colors: Green and gold
- Slogan: Family, Love, Respect
- Mascot: Timber wolf
- Newspaper: The Mountain View Mirror
- Website: fcps.edu/MountainViewS

Mountain View Alternative High School is a public alternative high school in the unincorporated community of Centreville, Virginia, United States. It is part of Fairfax County Public Schools.

Mountain View is one of two alternative high schools operated by Fairfax County Public Schools and offers programs for students who require a nontraditional educational setting.

The school is accredited through the Southern Association of Colleges and Schools as a special purpose high school in the Commonwealth of Virginia.

== Student population ==
The school's student population consists of minors and adults, including students who may be pregnant or parenting, students for whom English is a second language, students who are returning to school after having had their education interrupted by life events, students who wish to accelerate their high school education, and students who have been administratively placed. The school is not intended for students with severe disciplinary problems.

== History ==
Mountain View Alternative High School was established in 1995. It occupies a building that was formerly used as Centreville Elementary School.
