= Fairfax Education Unions =

American labor union alliance

- Fairfax Education Unions
- Founded: 2023
- Location: Fairfax County, Virginia, United States
- Members: 27,500+ (2024)
- Key people: Leslie Houston (FEA president); David Walrod (FCFT president)
- Affiliations: American Federation of Teachers; National Education Association; AFL-CIO
- Website: feufairfax.org

The Fairfax Education Unions (FEU) is the bargaining agent for Fairfax County, Virginia Public Schools (FCPS) employees, formed as a partnership between the Fairfax Education Association and the Fairfax County Federation of Teachers. Certified in 2024 following an election covering around 27,500 workers, with around 14,000 teachers and 13,000 support staff, and ended a nearly 50-year period during which FCPS employees had no collectively bargained contract. The first collective bargaining agreements between FEU and FCPS were ratified by the Fairfax County School Board in January 2025.

== Background ==
Collective bargaining by public employees was effectively prohibited in Virginia for nearly half a century after a 1977 Supreme Court of Virginia decision; the prohibition was codified in state law and remained in force as one of the most restrictive public-sector labor regimes in the country. In 2020, the Virginia General Assembly, then under Democratic control, passed legislation signed by Governor Ralph Northam permitting local governments and school boards to authorize collective bargaining by their employees.

The Fairfax Education Association, founded in 1920, is the older and larger of the two FCPS-employee unions and is affiliated with the Virginia Education Association and the National Education Association. The Fairfax County Federation of Teachers is affiliated with the American Federation of Teachers and the AFL-CIO. The two organizations had historically competed for members; in 2023 they formalized an alliance, branded as the Fairfax Education Unions, in order to appear together as a single option on any future representation ballot and avoid splitting the pro-union vote.

== History ==
Fairfax County Public Schools (FCPS) held a collective bargaining work group with several groups in September 2021. The Fairfax County Board of Supervisors (FCBOS) approved an ordinance allowing for county government employees to engage in collective bargaining in October 2021 and Fairfax County Public Schools released a draft resolution in December 2021. In March 2023, the Fairfax County School Board adopted a draft Collective Bargaining Resolution defining the scope of bargaining at FCPS and authorizing employees to seek union representation.

FEU spent the following year collecting union authorization cards and building support among FCPS employees. The campaign drew on FCFT's own staff organizers, whose bargaining unit had recently formed and ratified a first collective bargaining agreement with the local in August 2023, affiliated with the Washington-Baltimore News Guild (TNG-CWA Local 32035); the FCFT–Guild contract identified Hayden Gise among the bargaining unit organizers who organized the staff-union contract. Gise was on staff during the build-up to the school board resolution vote. On May 1, 2024, FEU filed for elections in the licensed instructional and operational bargaining units.

In June 2024, FEU won the right to represent and collectively bargain for FCPS employees, winning 96.92% of instructional staff and 80.68% of operational staff in a union election. The FEU election increased the number of Virginians working under a collective bargaining agreement by 12%. The American Federation of Teachers hailed the formation of the union as "the largest U.S. public sector union victory in 25 years." People's World reported that the result increased Virginia's overall union density by at least 15 percent.

Negotiations between FEU and FCPS began in 2024 and produced tentative three-year agreements covering the instructional and operational units in October 2024. Bargaining-unit members ratified the agreements in November. The agreement was approved by the Fairfax County School Board in January 2025. The agreement included a 7% pay raise for all employees, more equitable pay raises for lower-paid staff, increased pay for special education teachers, just cause requirements for firing teachers, and increased planning time for elementary teachers. In May 2025, the FCBOS negotiated the pay raises down to 6% for employees in the union and 5% for employees not in the union, citing a budget shortfall. The collective bargaining agreement between FCPS and FEU is set to run from July 2025 to June 2028.

== Composition ==
The union has two bargaining units: a Licensed Instructional Unit, covering workers requiring a license, such as teachers, counselors, social workers, psychologists, librarians, technology specialists, and speech language pathologists; and an Operational Unit for non-licensed workers, including assistants, food service workers, security, custodians, transportation workers, and front office staff. Administrators and supervisors are represented by the Fairfax County Federation of Principals, Supervisors, and Administrators.

== See also ==
- Labor unions in the United States
- Right-to-work law
- List of the largest school districts in the United States by enrollment
