= Robert Tillman Hampton =

Georgian politician

Personal details
- Born: October 13, 1870 Youngcane, Union County, Georgia
- Died: July 23, 1956 (aged 85)
- Resting place: Morganton Cemetery, Morganton, Georgia
- Spouse: Alice Cordelia (Lefevers) Hampton
- Children: Hayden Wilburn Hampton
- Occupation: Farmer, merchant, politician

Robert Tillman Hampton (1870–1956) was a politician in the state of Georgia.

Hampton was a member of the Georgia House of Representatives for Fannin County (1931, 1935, 1937-37/38 Ex., 1945,45 Ex.-46, 1947).

Hampton was the parent of Hayden Wilburn Hampton, another member of the Georgia House of Representatives and of the Georgia State Senate.

== Personal life ==
Hampton married Alice Cordelia Lefevers on 1894 December 30.
