= Fairfax County Public Schools =

School division in Virginia, U.S.

Address
- 8115 Gatehouse Road (Fairfax County), Virginia, 22042; United States
- Coordinates: 38°52′06″N 77°13′26″W

District information
- Type: Public
- Motto: Engage; Inspire; Thrive
- Grades: Pre-K through 12
- Established: February 6, 1870; 156 years ago
- Superintendent: Michelle C. Reid
- School board: Kyle McDaniel Ryan McElveen; Ilryong Moon; Tom Dannan; Robyn Lady; Marcia St. John-Cunning; Melanie K. Meren; Ricardy Anderson; Mateo Dunne; Karl Frisch; Sandy Anderson; Seema Dixit Newt Shosteck
- Chair of the board: Robyn Lady
- Governing agency: Virginia Department of Education
- Schools: 223
- Budget: $3.9 billion (FY 2026)
- NCES District ID: 5101260

Students and staff
- Students: 180,559 (2024–25)
- Teachers: 12,675.75 (FTE) (2022–23)
- Staff: 25,625 (FTE) (2025–26)
- Student–teacher ratio: 1:11.24 (2023–24, K-7) 1:12.21 (2023–24, 8-12)

Other information
- Website: fcps.edu

Fairfax County Public Schools (FCPS) is a school division in the U.S. state of Virginia. The division is an agency of the Fairfax County government, and it administers the public schools in Fairfax County and the City of Fairfax. The main administrative offices of FCPS are located in the Merrifield area of Fairfax County, just west of the independent city of Falls Church.

As of December 2025, all schools in FCPS were accredited by the Virginia Department of Education.

With nearly 183,000 students enrolled as of March 2026, FCPS is the largest public school system in Virginia, and it was the 12th-largest school district in the country as of autumn 2021. The division has been led by Division Superintendent Michelle Reid since July 2022.

== History ==
=== Nineteenth century ===
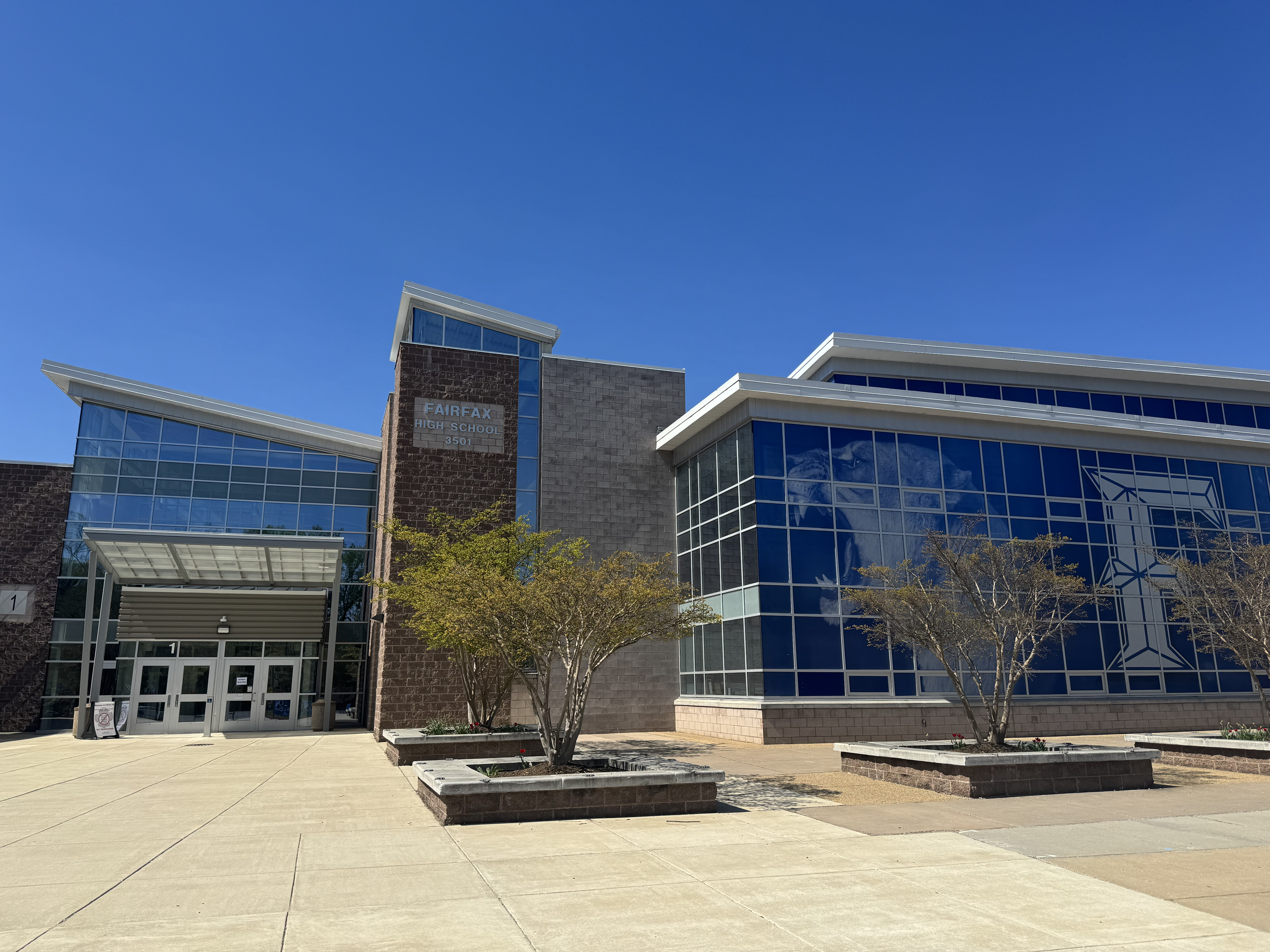
Fairfax High School in Fairfax

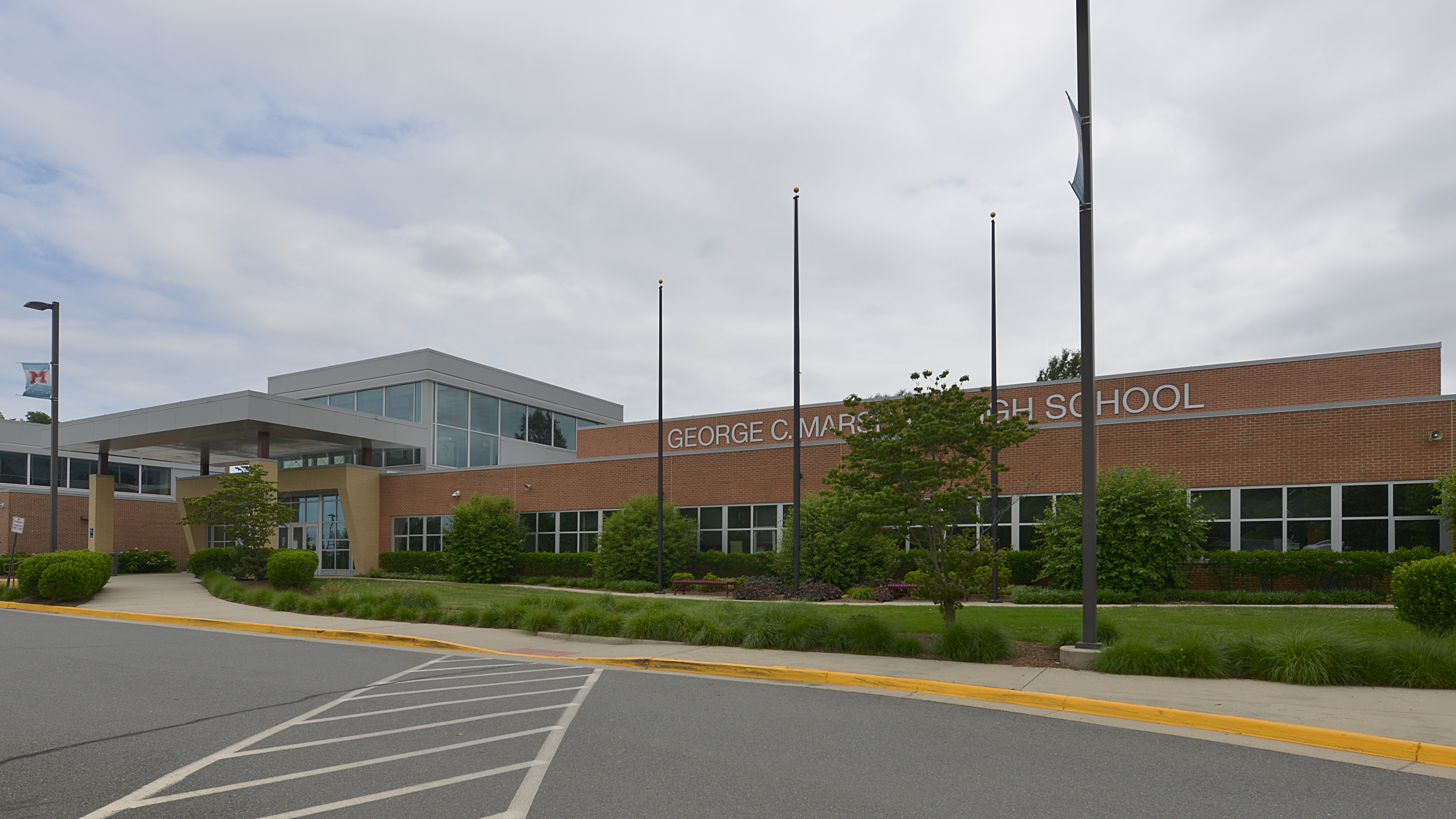
George C. Marshall High School in Falls Church

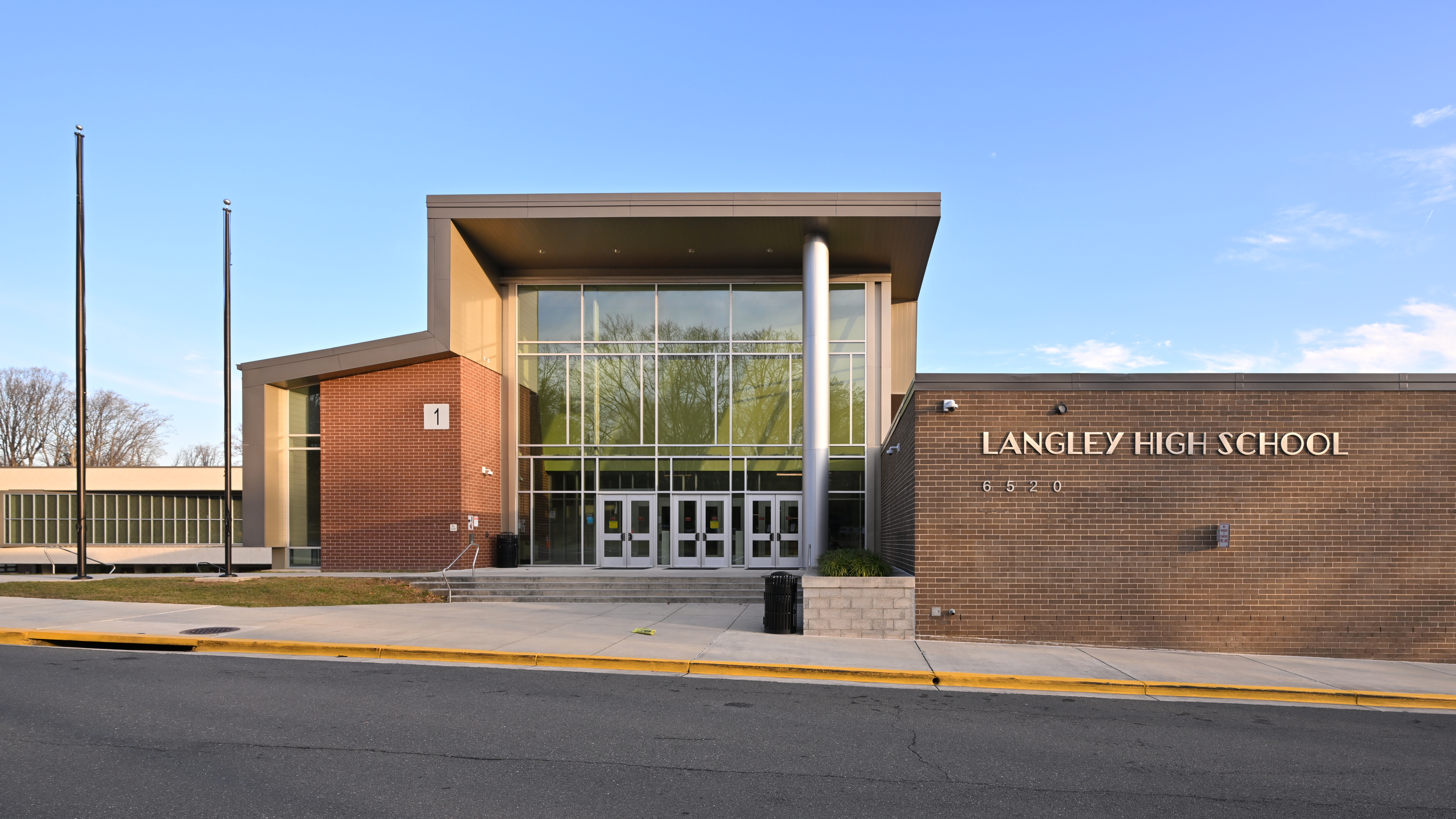
Langley High School in McLean

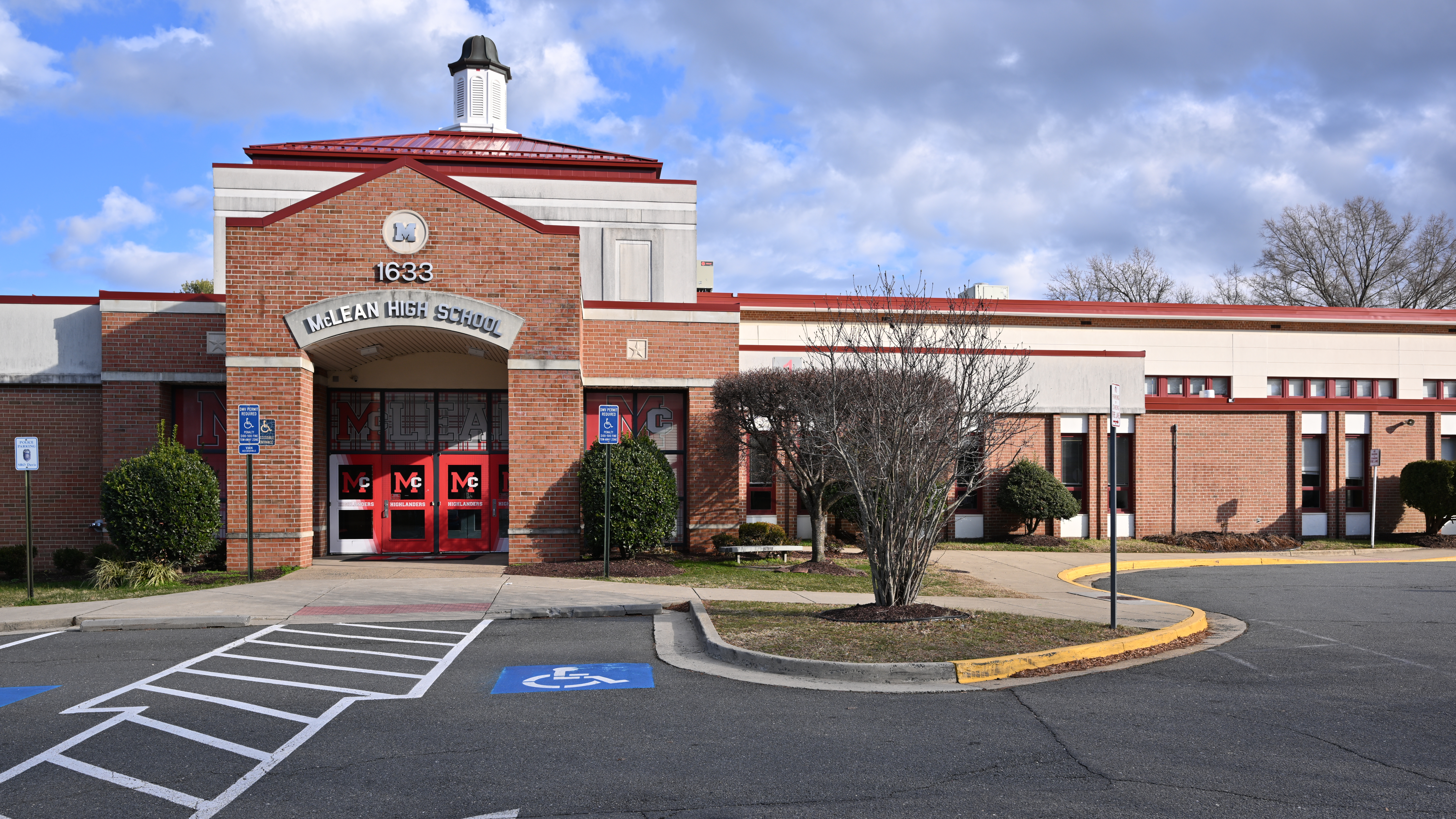
McLean High School in McLean

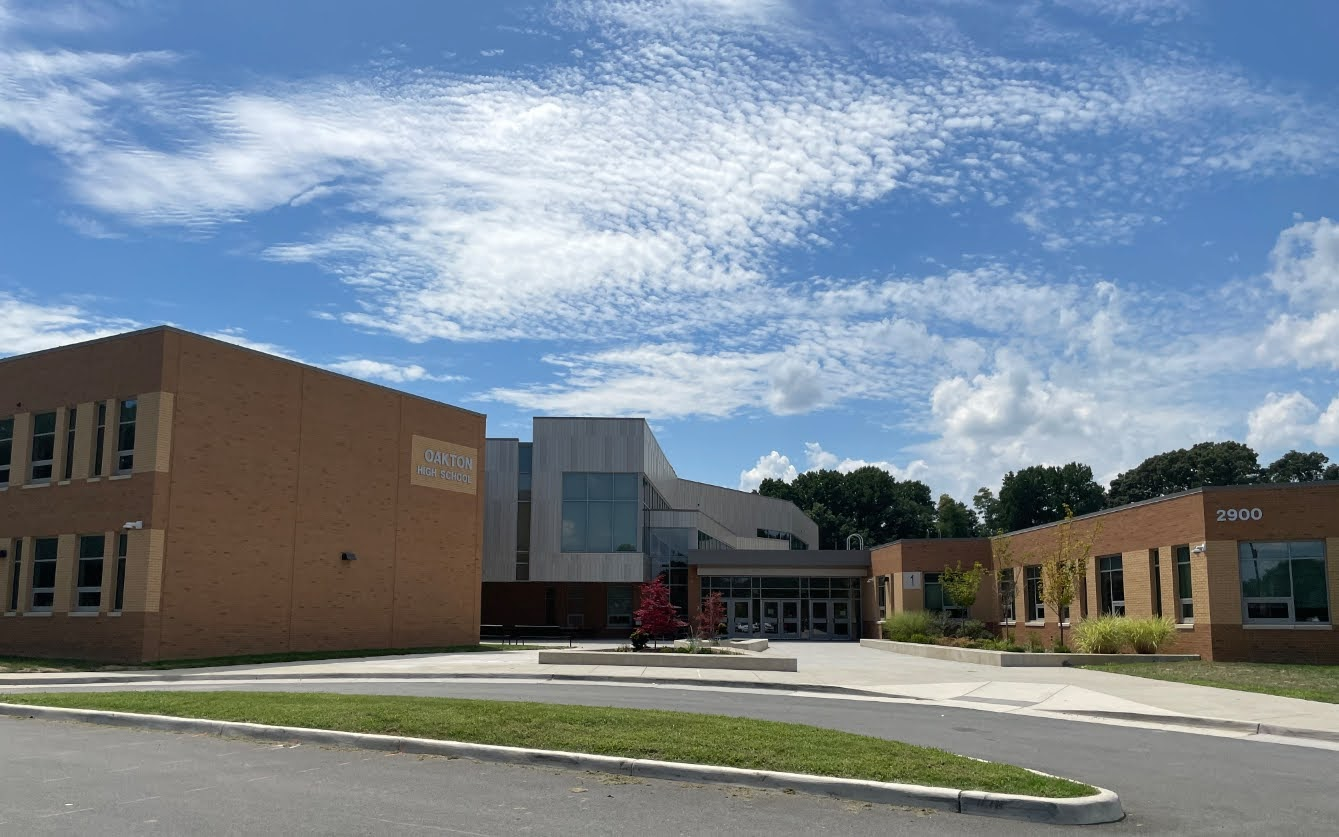
Oakton High School in Vienna

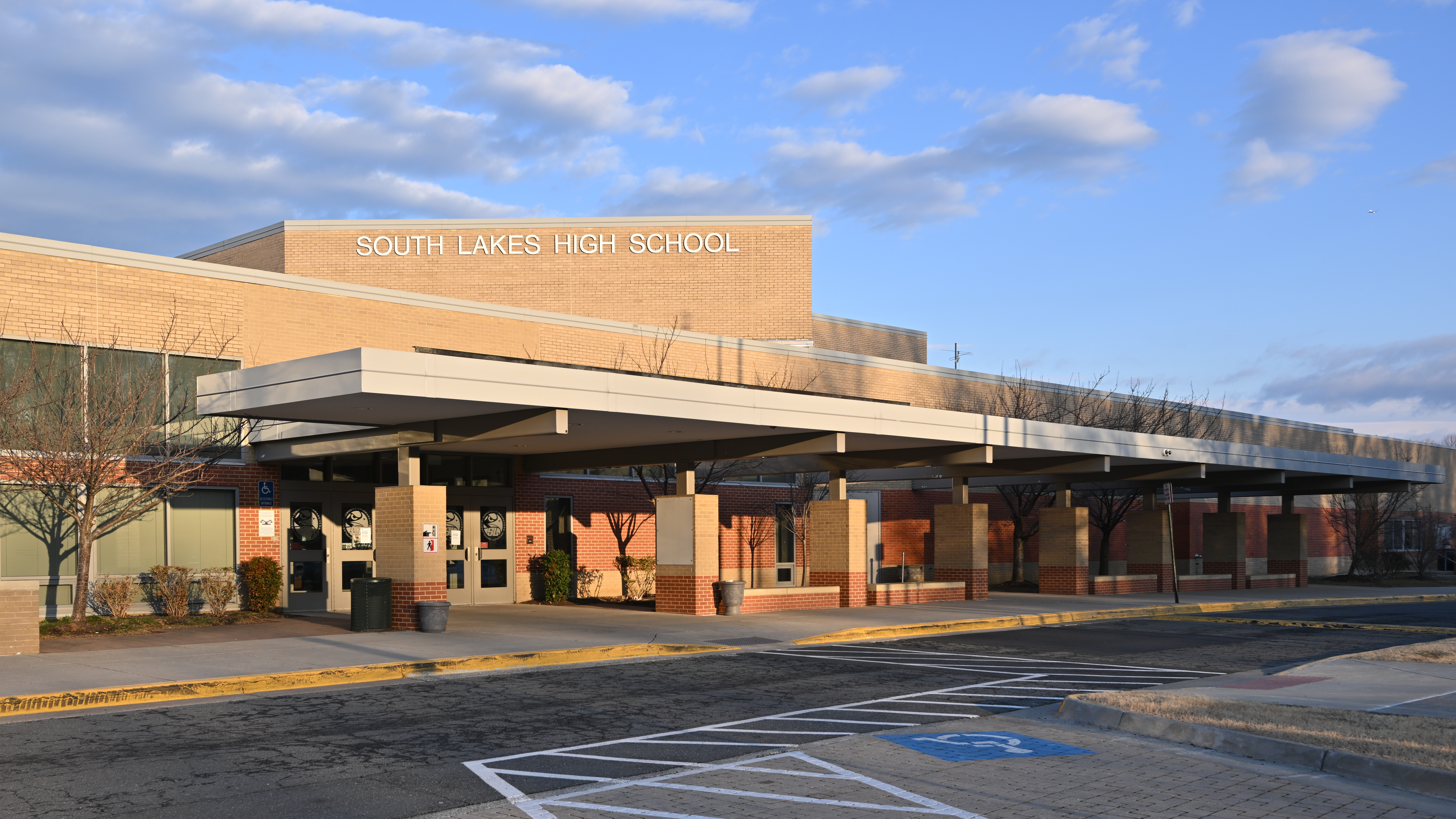
South Lakes High School in Reston

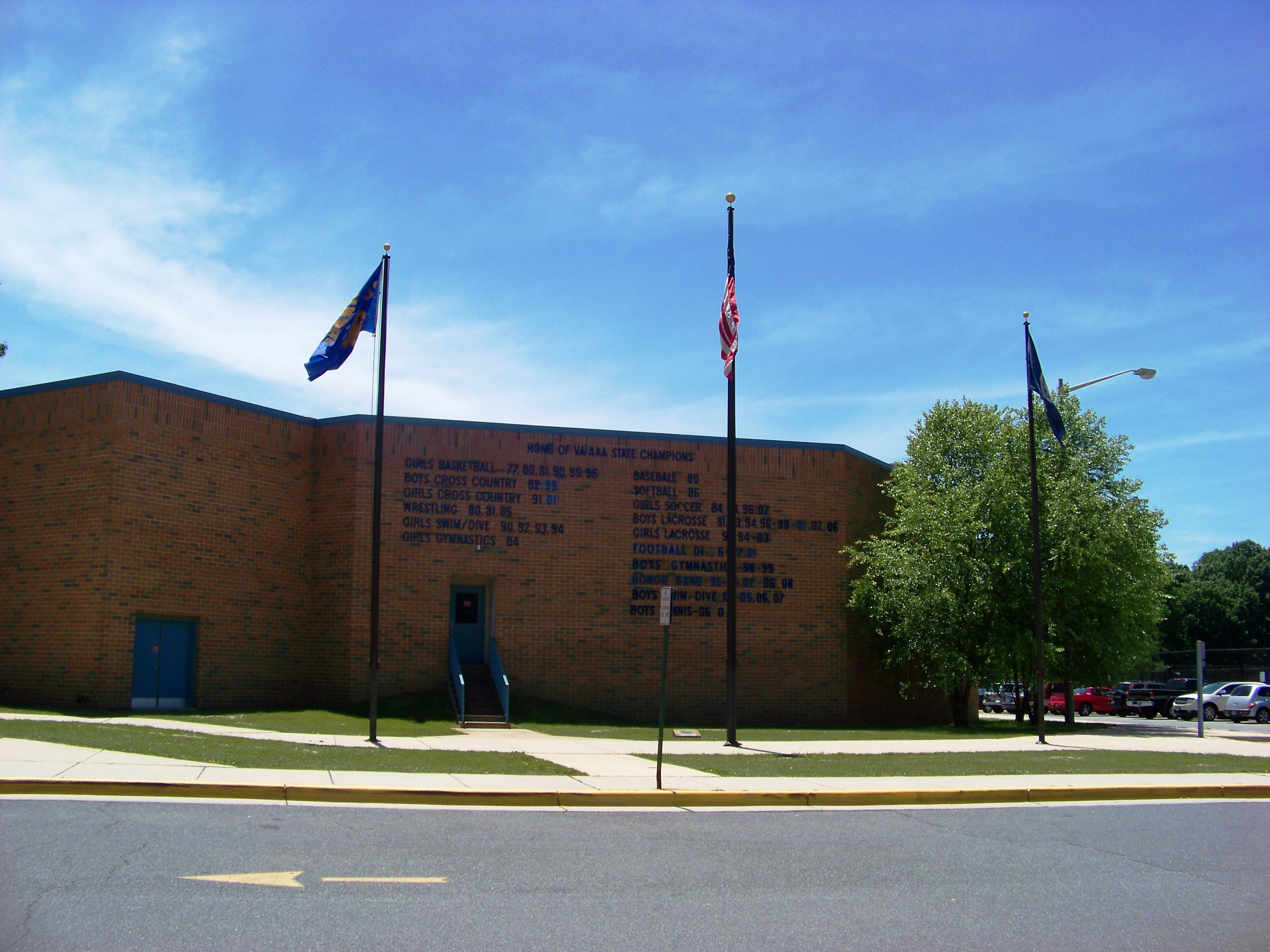
Robinson Secondary School in Fairfax

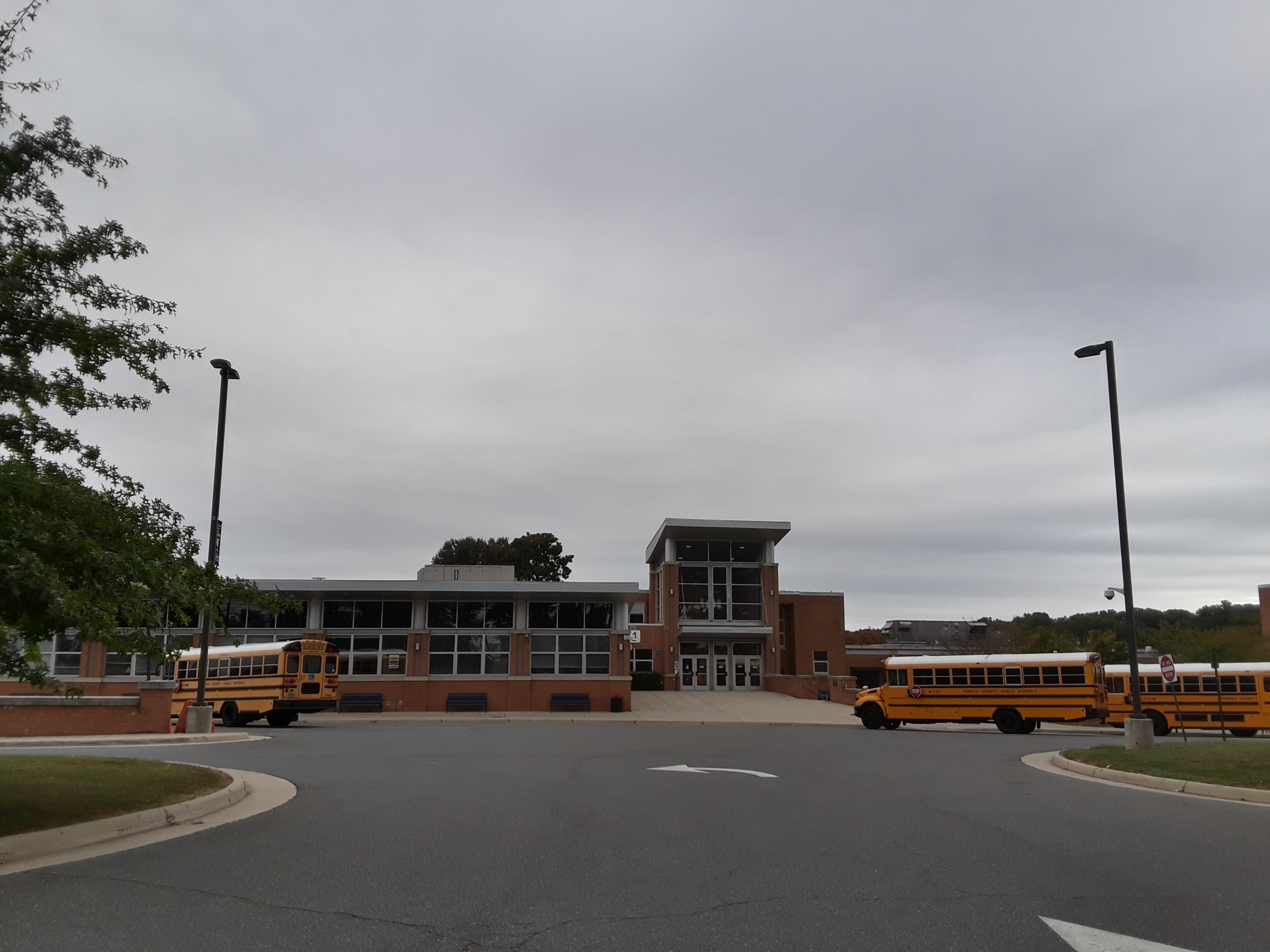
Carter G. Woodson High School (formerly Wilbert Tucker Woodson High School) in Fairfax

The public school system in Fairfax County, Virginia, was created after the American Civil War, following Virginia's adoption of its Reconstruction-era state constitution in 1870; this made free public education a constitutional right for the first time. The first superintendent of schools for Fairfax County was Thomas M. Moore, who was sworn in on September 26, 1870. At the time of its creation, the Fairfax County Public Schools system consisted of 41 schools—28 serving White students and 13 serving Black students.

In 1886, Milton D. Hall was appointed superintendent, and he served for 44 years until his retirement in 1929.

=== Twentieth century ===
Fairfax County Public Schools, like most school systems in the American South, practiced de jure segregation. The county had local elementary schools for Black students, but no high schools for Black students. Although Fairfax County was densely populated, it had proportionately few Black high school students. Fairfax, Prince William, Loudoun, Arlington, and Fauquier counties all shared a high school for Black students. This school was centrally located among the counties in Manassas. Other students attended high schools in Washington, D.C., where many had relatives. Those schools included Armstrong High School, Cardozo High School, Dunbar High School, and Phelps Vocational Center. In 1951, Fairfax County began construction of Luther Jackson High School after residents requested a high school for Black students. In 1954, FCPS had 42 elementary schools and six high schools; Luther Jackson High School opened in Falls Church as the first high school for Black students in the county.

In 1954, the Supreme Court's decision in the case of Brown v. Board of Education ordered an end to racial segregation in public schools. In response, Virginia enacted legislation to prevent desegregation, took control of school placement decisions, and closed some school systems that attempted to desegregate. When Arlington County announced an early desegregation plan, its school board was dismissed by the State Board of Education.

In 1955, the Fairfax County School Board renamed its "Committee on Desegregation" the "Committee on Segregation", after a petition and the threat of litigation from a civic group called the Virginia Citizens' Committee for Better Schools.

After the Brown v. Board of Education decision, Daniel L. Duke—author of Education Empire: The Evolution of an Excellent Suburban School System—wrote: "Whether local school systems such as Fairfax County, left to their own, would have moved forward to implement desegregation in the late fifties will never be known. Richmond removed any possibility of local option...".

Court decisions later noted that the state, rather than the county, controlled student placement during this period. A 1964 decision stated:

Prior to the Brown decision Fairfax County maintained a dual school system: one for Negro students; one for all other races. Shortly thereafter the placement of all children in the Fairfax County schools was taken from the local school board and vested in the state Pupil Placement Board. The assignment of students remained with the state Board until the 1961–62 school year, at which time placement responsibilities were reinvested in the local School Board.

Fairfax County began its desegregation efforts shortly thereafter.

By 1955, delegates from Northern Virginia in the Virginia General Assembly openly opposed the Stanley Plan—1956 statutes supporting racial segregation in Virginia—and called for more far-reaching legislation. Virginia's 10th congressional district was the only district to vote against the Gray Plan. Delegate Boatwright introduced another bill aimed at Northern Virginia school boards. Known as the Boatwright Bill, it would have prohibited certain federal employees from serving on school boards or holding other local offices. Boatwright said that his bill applied to all Virginia communities, but he acknowledged that Northern Virginia would be most affected. Supporters of the bill argued that federal employees favored the federal government's position on integration. At the time, four members of the seven-member Fairfax County School Board were federal employees.

In the case of Blackwell v. Fairfax County School Board in 1960, Black plaintiffs charged that Fairfax County's grade-a-year desegregation plan was discriminatory and dilatory. Fifteen Black children had been refused admission to White schools because they did not fall within the grades covered by the school board's assignment plan. The plaintiffs successfully argued that desegregation was proceeding too slowly under the plan. District Judge Albert V. Bryan did not categorically reject grade-a-year plans, but he held that they needed to be judged according to the character of the community. Since Black students made up less than four percent of Fairfax County's school population, Bryan considered fear of racial friction an unacceptable justification for such a cautious desegregation plan.

The report by the U.S. Commission on Civil Rights in 1962 found that "Every sign indicates that the communities in Northern Virginia will be the first in the State to reach compliance with the mandate in the School Segregation Cases." Fairfax County was later among the first school systems in the country to receive funds to aid desegregation because of its efforts to implement a desegregated system.

The Fairfax County School Board voted in 1958 to switch from a 7–5 grade-level configuration (i.e., 7 grades in elementary school and 5 grades in high school) to a 6–2–4 configuration, necessitating the creation of what were then called intermediate schools for students in grades 7 and 8. By the time the first eight intermediate schools opened in fall 1960, they had already exceeded their 1,000-student capacities.

In fall 1960, the first Black students were admitted to newly desegregated Fairfax County public schools. For example, Jerald R. Betz and Raynard Wheeler enrolled at Belvedere Elementary School in Falls Church, and Gwendolyn Brooks enrolled at Cedar Lane Elementary School in Vienna.

The changeover to the 6–2–4 plan was the last major initiative of Superintendent W. T. Woodson, who retired in 1961 after 32 years as head of FCPS; this was the second-longest tenure in the system's history. In April 1961, Earl C. Funderburk, superintendent of schools in Wilmington, North Carolina, was appointed to replace Woodson.

In 1961, FCPS also began administering schools in the City of Fairfax.

As early as 1965, Superintendent Funderburk was discussing plans to decentralize FCPS. By 1967, he had developed a plan for five area offices, each serving part of the county, and he had appointed Woodson High School Principal Robert E. Phipps and West Springfield High School Principal S. John Davis as the first two area administrators that December.

Although the school board had endorsed Funderburk's plan, it also hired the consulting firm Cresap, McCormick & Paget to audit the system's management organization and operations. In 1968, based on the consultant's recommendations, the school board implemented a significantly modified version of the decentralization plan, dividing FCPS into four areas that functioned as miniature school systems. In January 1969, Funderburk resigned, telling the school board that he did not want a third term as superintendent. In May 1969, the school board selected Lawrence M. Watts—of the Greece School District in Greece, New York—to lead FCPS, which had grown during Funderburk's tenure from 65,000 to 122,000 students.

In May 1970, Watts appointed Taylor M. Williams as the first Black high school principal in FCPS since desegregation, placing him in charge of James Madison High School in Vienna. The appointment was one of Watts' final official acts. After less than a year as superintendent, Watts died of a heart attack at age 44 in June 1970 (at his home in Oakton). Assistant Superintendent S. Barry Morris was named interim superintendent, while the school board sought a replacement to lead the 130,000-student school system.

In September 1970, Area Superintendent S. John Davis was chosen after a nationwide search to serve the remaining 33 months of Watts' four-year term.

During the mid-1970s, Davis faced declining enrollment and population shifts. The student population dropped from a high of 145,385 in the 1974–75 school year to a low of 122,646 in 1982–83. Families also migrated from established eastern and central parts of the county to newer developments in the west and south, requiring Davis to request the closure of some schools while seeking to build new ones elsewhere.

In a 6–5 vote in May 1976, the school board voted to reinstitute textbook rental fees, hoping to raise an additional $1.3 million to close a projected budget shortfall. The plan was scrapped two months later, in July, when the board was able to find a $1.4 million surplus.

In 1978, Fairfax County began countywide enforcement of its 15-year-old standardized six-point letter grading scale, with a ten-point spread at the bottom of the grading range. The grading scale, established in 1963, provided that a score of 94–100% was an A, 87–93% a B, 80–86% a C, and 70–79% a D, with any score below 70% an F.

The county school board adopted a $279 million budget in February 1979, which included a 5.15% cost-of-living raise for the system's teachers and other employees. The increase was only slightly more than half of the 9.9% inflation rate that month and less than the 9.4% increase that FCPS employees had sought. In April 1979, the Fairfax Education Association (FEA)—the professional association representing teachers in the county—adopted a work-to-rule action. Under the action, teachers would not work beyond the 7.5 hours per day that were specified in their contracts. The FEA also gave Superintendent Davis a vote of no confidence.

The vote of no confidence was cited as a major factor in Davis' decision to resign from FCPS on May 18, 1979. He accepted an appointment from Governor John N. Dalton as Virginia Superintendent of Public Education, despite taking a $5,000-per-year pay cut.

After Davis resigned, the Fairfax County School Board appointed Associate Superintendent William J. Burkholder as interim superintendent.

In November 1979, after a four-month search, the school board named Lucius Linton Deck, Jr.—superintendent in Orange County, Florida—to lead FCPS. Deck's 6 1/2 years in Orange County had drawn mixed reactions, with some residents glad to see him leave, but others praising him as a strong and professional leader.

Deck inherited the issue of closing underused schools, which had also affected Superintendent Davis. Twenty-nine elementary schools, mostly in the eastern part of the county, were studied for possible closure; however, Deck recommended in April 1980 that eight schools be closed, five more than the review panel had suggested. The following month, the school board voted at its May 22 meeting to close seven of the eight schools, a decision that was met with angry hisses and boos from parents in attendance.

Fairfax County teachers' work-to-rule action, which had begun in April 1979, ended in May 1980.

In January 1981, Linton Deck accepted a new four-year contract as superintendent of FCPS. Shortly before accepting this contract, Deck proposed covering $2.75 million of his proposed $395 million 1982 school budget by instituting textbook rental fees for students. This plan would have charged annual textbook fees ranging from $22 for elementary school students to $30 per year for high school students. Although permitted by Virginia law, the plan was scrapped after strong criticism.

Deck faced several controversies, including his handling of an investigation into recruiting violations by the Mount Vernon High School athletic department, his censure by the FEA over a school closing, criticism of his leadership style, and pressure from the Fairfax County Board of Supervisors over his proposed budget. The school board forced Deck to resign on June 24, 1982, only 1 1/2 years into his four-year contract. The board appointed William J. Burkholder as acting superintendent.

At its meeting on April 25, 1991, the school board approved a plan under which several intermediate schools in areas of the county with declining enrollment would add sixth-grade classes and become middle schools. The affected schools had served only seventh and eighth grades for the previous 31 years. Under the plan, Glasgow, Holmes, and Poe intermediate schools added sixth-grade classes.

In 1993, teacher merit pay, then four years old, was suspended because of budget cuts. At its March 11 meeting, the school board voted to phase out the program completely over the next four years.

=== Special education ===
FCPS took over the education of students with mental disabilities from a parent-organized cooperative in 1953. The parents had started the program in 1950, using whatever space could be found to educate their children, but they eventually asked FCPS to take control of the program.

In 1955, special education classes for mentally disabled students were expanded to include four classes for "educable" children, described as those with a mental age above 7, at Groveton, Lincolnia, Oakton, and Luther Jackson schools. A separate class for "trainable" children, defined as those with a mental age of less than 6 1/2, was offered at Groveton.

In recent years, parents of students with individualized education programs (IEPs) and Section 504 plans have filed lawsuits against FCPS. These lawsuits alleged that the district failed to provide required services and resources under students' special education plans. The lawsuits also alleged violations of federal disability-rights laws, including the Americans with Disabilities Act and the Individuals with Disabilities Education Act.

Complaints and lawsuits about FCPS's services for students with disabilities led to an investigation by the United States Department of Education's Office for Civil Rights. In 2022, this office found that FCPS had failed (or been unable) to provide a free appropriate public education to thousands of students with disabilities during remote learning. The findings included failures to provide services identified in students' IEPs and Section 504 plans.

=== Twenty-first century ===
Until 2006, the Fairfax County school system was headquartered at 10700 Page Avenue, in an unincorporated area of the county surrounded by the City of Fairfax. In 2006, FCPS moved all of its operations from the Burkholder Center, as well as several other school-owned and leased offices, to the office building on Gatehouse Road.

==== Operations and statistics ====
As of March 2026, Virginia School Quality Profiles (from the Virginia Department of Education) listed FCPS as having 195 schools, including 25 high schools, three secondary schools, 24 middle schools, 141 elementary schools, and two centers for special education. FCPS operates more than 1,600 school buses, including 31 electric buses, and it transports 131,000 students daily. Its approved operating budget for fiscal year 2026 was $3.9 billion, and the system had 41,298 employees, including 25,625 full-time equivalent positions.

As of 2026, FCPS was the largest school system in Virginia and the ninth-largest in the United States. For the class of 2025, FCPS reported an on-time graduation rate of 93.3% and an average SAT score of 1,183. FCPS uses an electronic visitor-management system to control visitor access at its schools.

=== 2025 House committee investigation ===
On November 24, 2025, the U.S. House Committee on Education and Workforce announced an investigation into antisemitism in several kindergarten-to-12th-grade (K–12) school districts, including Fairfax County Public Schools. In a letter to Superintendent Michelle Reid, committee chairman Tim Walberg said that the committee was investigating whether FCPS had a hostile environment for Jewish students, and whether FCPS was fulfilling its obligations under Title VI of the Civil Rights Act of 1964 to address harassment and prevent its recurrence.

== Academic programs and courses ==
FCPS offers several academic programs and course options at select schools:

- Advanced Placement (AP) program: The AP program provides college-preparatory coursework in various subject areas for high school students. FCPS offers 39 AP courses at schools having AP programs.
- International Baccalaureate (IB) programs: FCPS offers the IB Middle Years Program (MYP) for grades 6-10 and the IB Diploma Program (DP) for grades 11 and 12.
- FCPS Online Campus: Students can take online courses for high school credit through the FCPS Online Campus. These courses are identical to those taught in traditional classrooms.
- Academy elective courses: FCPS high school Academies offer advanced technical and specialized elective courses that combine career and academic preparation. Students enrolled in Academy electives may participate in career experiences such as shadowing, mentoring, and internships with local businesses.

== Controversies ==
=== Debate over grading policies ===
Before May 2009, FCPS used a six-point grading scale on which 94–100% was an A, 90–93% was a B+, 84–89% was a B, and so on. In 2008, a group of parents raised concerns about whether FCPS's method of weighting and computing grades for advanced courses adversely affected FCPS students applying for college admissions, honors programs, and merit-based scholarship awards.

On January 2, 2009, Superintendent Jack D. Dale announced his recommendation to change the weighting of advanced courses while retaining the six-point grading scale. Dale stated that there was no conclusive evidence that the six-point grading scale disadvantaged FCPS students.

FCPS worked with the parent group to jointly review the issue. On January 22, 2009, the Fairfax County School Board directed Dale to report back with a new version of the grading scale by March 2009. The board also approved changing the weighting for Honors courses to 0.5 effective with the 2009–2010 school year, and for AP and IB courses to 1.0 retroactively.

After the review, the Fairfax County School Board approved a modified ten-point scale with pluses and minuses. The new scale took effect at the beginning of the 2009–10 school year. On the new scale, 93–100% is an A, 90–92% is an A−, 87–89% is a B+, and so on.

=== Controversy over disciplinary policies ===
In 2009 and 2011, Fairfax County Public Schools' disciplinary policies for drug-related offenses came under community scrutiny after two students died by suicide following school disciplinary proceedings. Both students—17-year-old Josh Anderson of South Lakes High School, who died in 2009, and 15-year-old Nick Stuban of Woodson High School, who died in 2011—had been suspended from their schools for marijuana-related offenses. The school district also suspended at least one student for possession of her prescription medication.

Although then-Superintendent Jack D. Dale maintained that FCPS's disciplinary policy did not constitute "zero tolerance", the suicides nevertheless prompted the school board and the state legislature to revisit school disciplinary policies. After a year-long study, the school board voted to relax punishments for marijuana possession and add requirements for parental notification when students face serious disciplinary sanctions.

=== Thomas Jefferson High School for Science and Technology ===
In late 2022 and early 2023, Thomas Jefferson High School for Science and Technology was investigated by Jason Miyares, the Attorney General of Virginia, for withholding notification from parents that their children had received a National Merit Scholarship award; this made national headlines. The high school was also sued for a change made to their admissions policy, shifting from a standardized test to a written exam.

== Organization ==
Fairfax County School Board

Type
- Type: School board
- Term limits: none

Leadership
- Chair: Robyn Lady
- Vice Chair: Kyle McDaniel

Structure
- Seats: 12 – 9 elected by district, 3 "at-large"
- Political groups: Majority: Democratic (12); Minority: Republican (0)
- Length of term: 4 years, renewable
- Salary: $48,000 per annum + $2,000 (chair)

Elections
- Last election: November 7, 2023
- Next election: November 2, 2027

FCPS is led by a superintendent and is overseen by a school board. The current superintendent is Dr. Michelle C. Reid, who began her term on July 1, 2022.

For FCPS administrative and governance purposes, Fairfax County is organized into six geographically based regions (numbered 1 through 6). Each region is led by an assistant superintendent, who oversees operations at schools within their region.

FCPS's headquarters is located in the Gatehouse Administration Center in Merrifield, an unincorporated section of the county near the city of Falls Church; the headquarters has a Falls Church address but is not within city limits.

=== School board ===
Virginia statutes and the Virginia Board of Education charge the Fairfax County School Board with setting general school policy, as well as establishing guidelines that ensure proper administration and operation of FCPS.

The Fairfax County School Board has 12 elected members and one student representative. Nine elected members are chosen, one from each of the following magisterial districts: Braddock, Dranesville, Franconia, Hunter Mill, Mason, Mount Vernon, Providence, Springfield, and Sully. Three additional elected members are chosen "at-large". Members are elected for four-year terms. A student representative, selected for a one-year term by the Student Advisory Council, sits with the board at all public meetings and participates in discussions but does not vote. The board chair is elected to serve for a one-year term; the current chair, Robyn Lady (Dranesville), has been serving since July 9, 2026.

The current members of the school board are Tom Dannan (Braddock), Robyn A. Lady (Dranesville), Marcia C. St. John-Cunning (Franconia), Melanie K. Meren (Hunter Mill), Ricardy J. Anderson (Mason), Mateo Dunne (Mount Vernon), Karl V. Frisch (Providence), Sandy B. Anderson (Springfield), and Seema Dixit (Sully). The other three members, R. Kyle McDaniel, Ryan L. McElveen, and Ilryong Moon, serve as "at-large" members. Newt Shosteck from Hayfield Secondary School serves as the non-voting student representative.

=== Union ===
FCPS teachers and support staff are unionized under Fairfax Education Unions (FEU). The bargaining agent certified in 2024 following an election covering around 27,500 workers, with around 14,000 teachers and 13,000 support staff. Administrators and supervisors are represented by the Fairfax County Federation of Principals, Supervisors, and Administrators. The first collective bargaining agreements between FEU and FCPS were ratified by the Fairfax County School Board in January 2025.

== Schools ==
=== High schools ===
- Annandale High School (Atoms) – Annandale
- Centreville High School (Wildcats) – Clifton
- Chantilly High School (Chargers) – Chantilly
- Thomas Alva Edison High School (Eagles) – Alexandria
- Fairfax High School (Lions) (formerly the Rebels) – Fairfax
- Falls Church High School (Jaguars) – Falls Church
- Herndon High School (Hornets) – Herndon
- Justice High School (formerly J. E. B. Stuart High School) (Wolves) – Falls Church
- Langley High School (Saxons) – McLean
- John R. Lewis High School (Lancers) – Springfield (formerly Robert E. Lee High School)
- James Madison High School (Warhawks) – Vienna
- George C. Marshall High School (Statesmen) – Falls Church
- McLean High School (Highlanders) – McLean
- Mount Vernon High School (Majors) – Alexandria
- Oakton High School (Cougars) – Vienna
- South County High School (Stallions) – Lorton
- South Lakes High School (Seahawks) – Reston
- Skyview High School - Floris
- Thomas Jefferson High School for Science and Technology (Colonials) – Alexandria
- West Potomac High School (Wolverines) – Alexandria
- West Springfield High School (Spartans) – Springfield
- Westfield High School (Bulldogs) – Chantilly
- Carter G. Woodson High School (formerly W. T. Woodson High School) (Cavaliers) – Fairfax

=== Secondary schools ===
- Hayfield Secondary School (Hawks) – Alexandria
- Lake Braddock Secondary School (Bruins) – Burke
- Robinson Secondary School (Rams) – Fairfax

=== Alternative high schools ===
- Bryant Alternative High School (Bears) – Alexandria
- Fairfax County Adult High School – Springfield
- Mountain View Alternative High School (Timberwolves) – Centreville

=== Middle schools ===
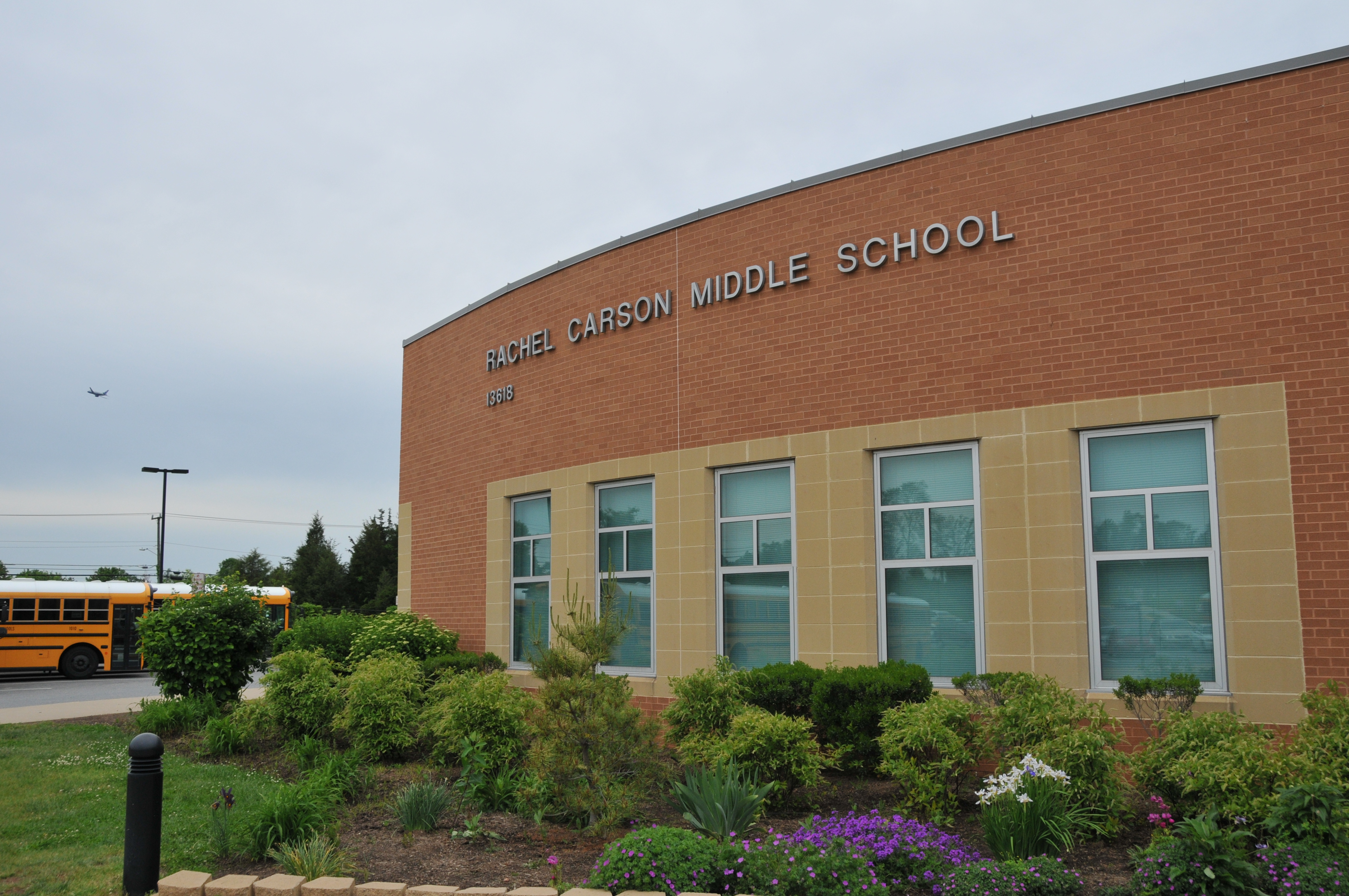
Rachel Carson Middle School in Herndon

- Carl Sandburg Middle School – Alexandria
- Edgar Allan Poe Middle School – Annandale
- Ellen Glasgow Middle School – Lincolnia
- Francis Scott Key Middle School – Springfield
- Franklin Middle School – Chantilly
- Frost Middle School – Fairfax
- Henry Wadsworth Longfellow Middle School – Falls Church
- Herndon Middle School – Herndon
- James Fenimore Cooper Middle School – McLean
- Joyce Kilmer Middle School – Vienna
- Katherine Johnson Middle School (formerly Sidney Lanier Middle School) – Fairfax
- Langston Hughes Middle School – Reston
- Liberty Middle School – Clifton
- Luther Jackson Middle School – Falls Church
- Mark Twain Middle School – Alexandria
- Oliver Wendell Holmes Middle School – Alexandria
- Ormond Stone Middle School – Centreville
- Rachel Carson Middle School – Herndon
- Rocky Run Middle School – Chantilly
- South County Middle School – Lorton
- Thoreau Middle School – Vienna
- Walt Whitman Middle School – Alexandria
- Washington Irving Middle School – Springfield

=== Elementary schools ===
There are 141 elementary schools in Fairfax County:

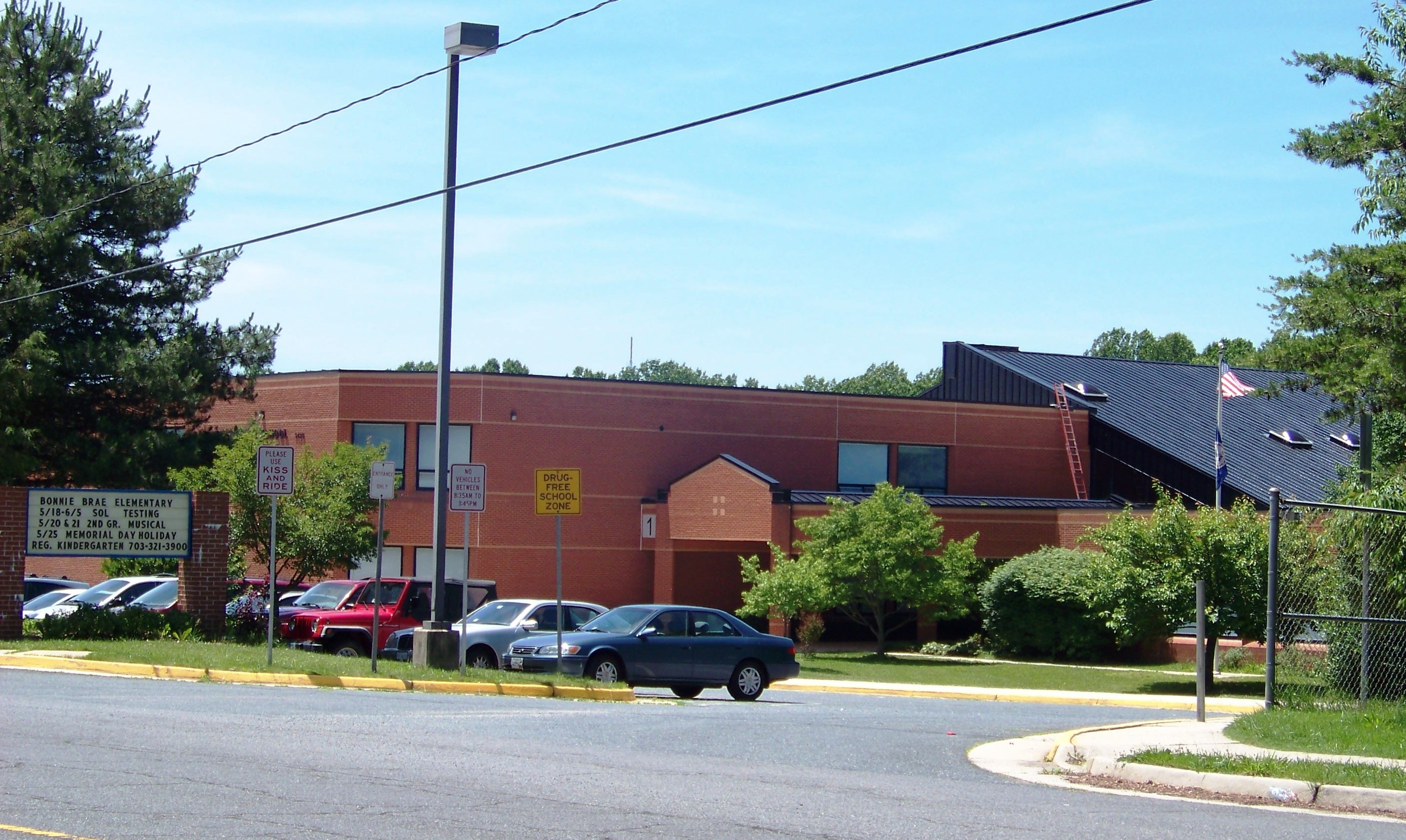
Bonnie Brae Elementary School in Fairfax

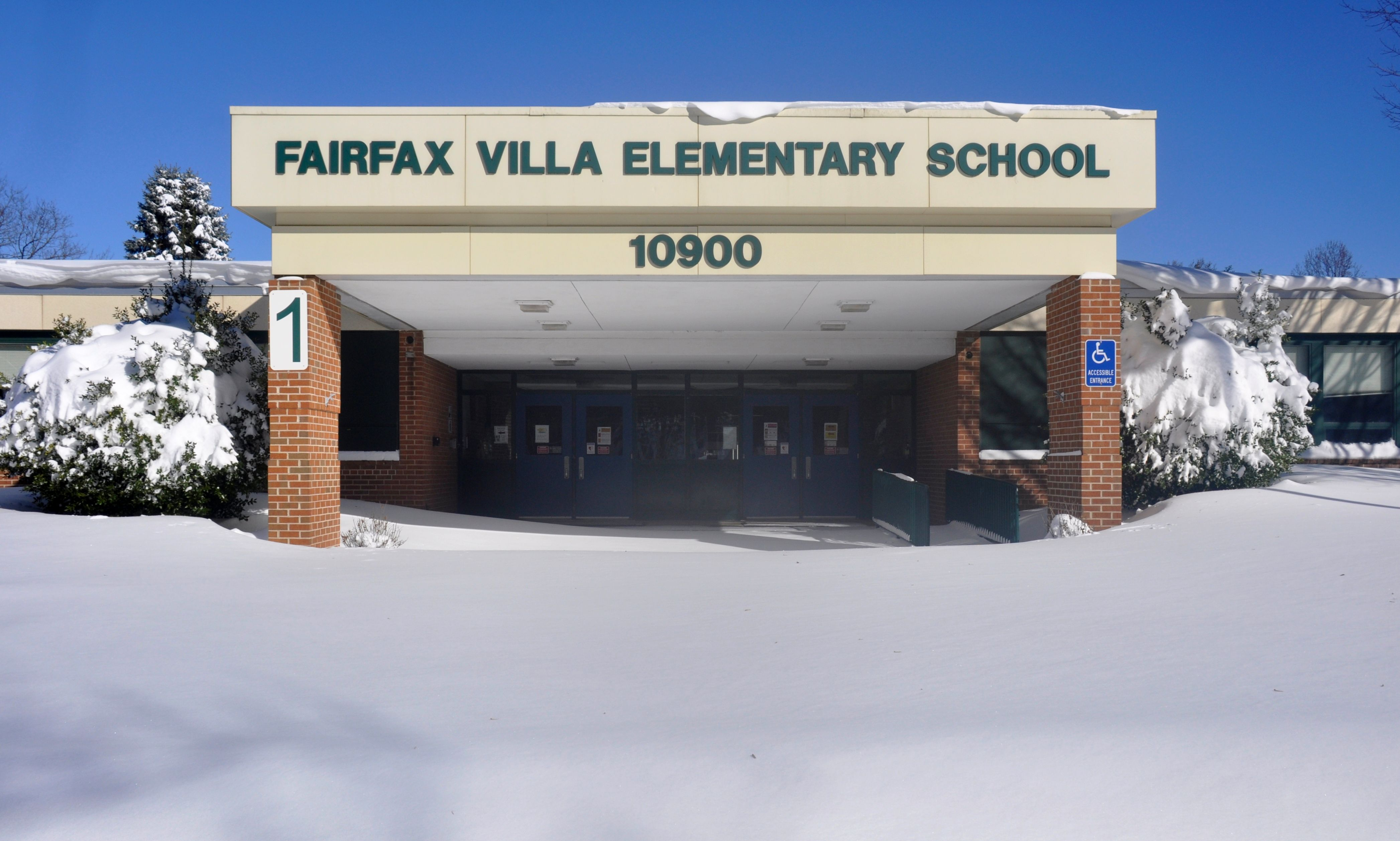
Fairfax Villa Elementary School in Fairfax

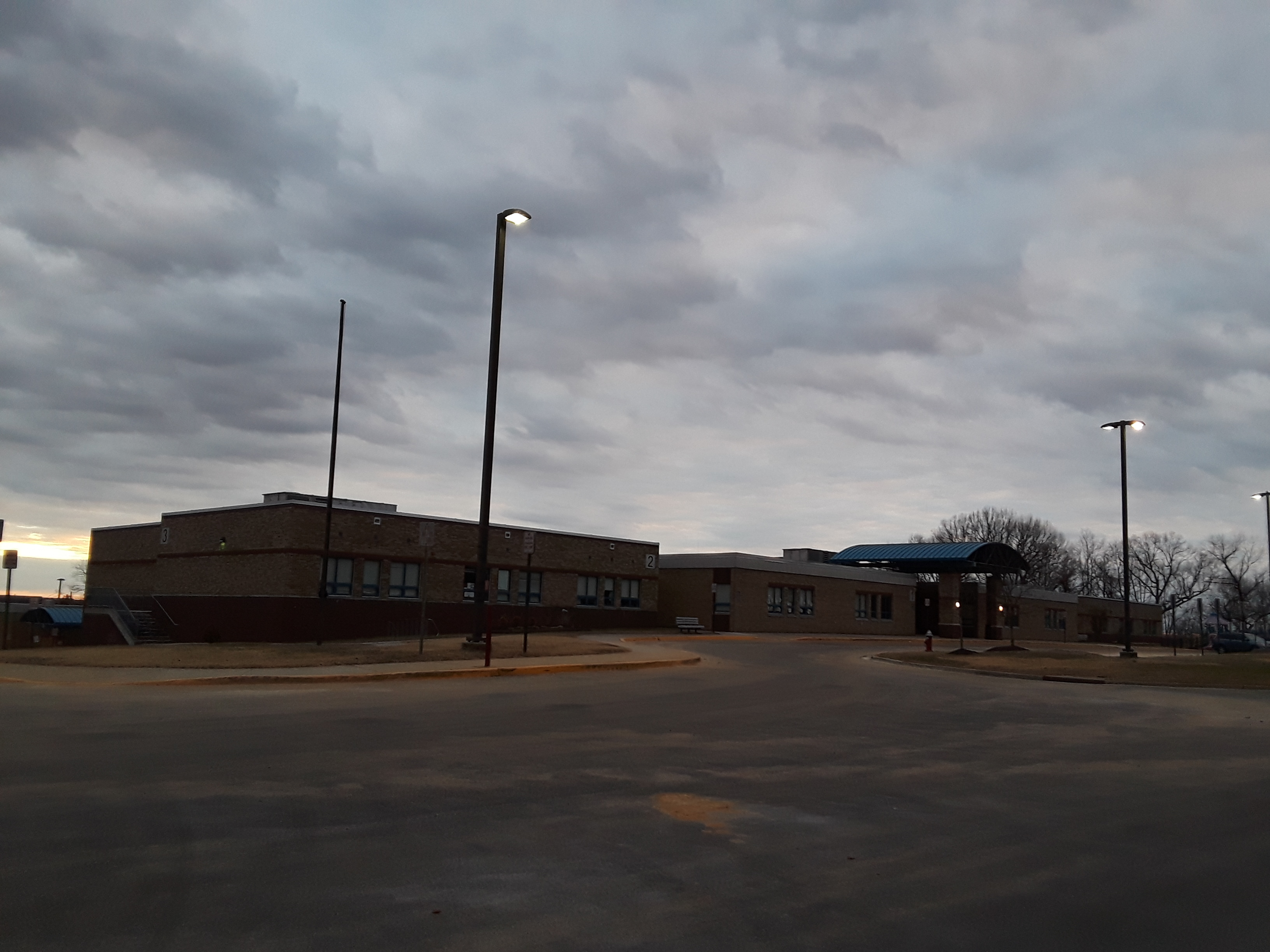
Groveton Elementary School in Alexandria

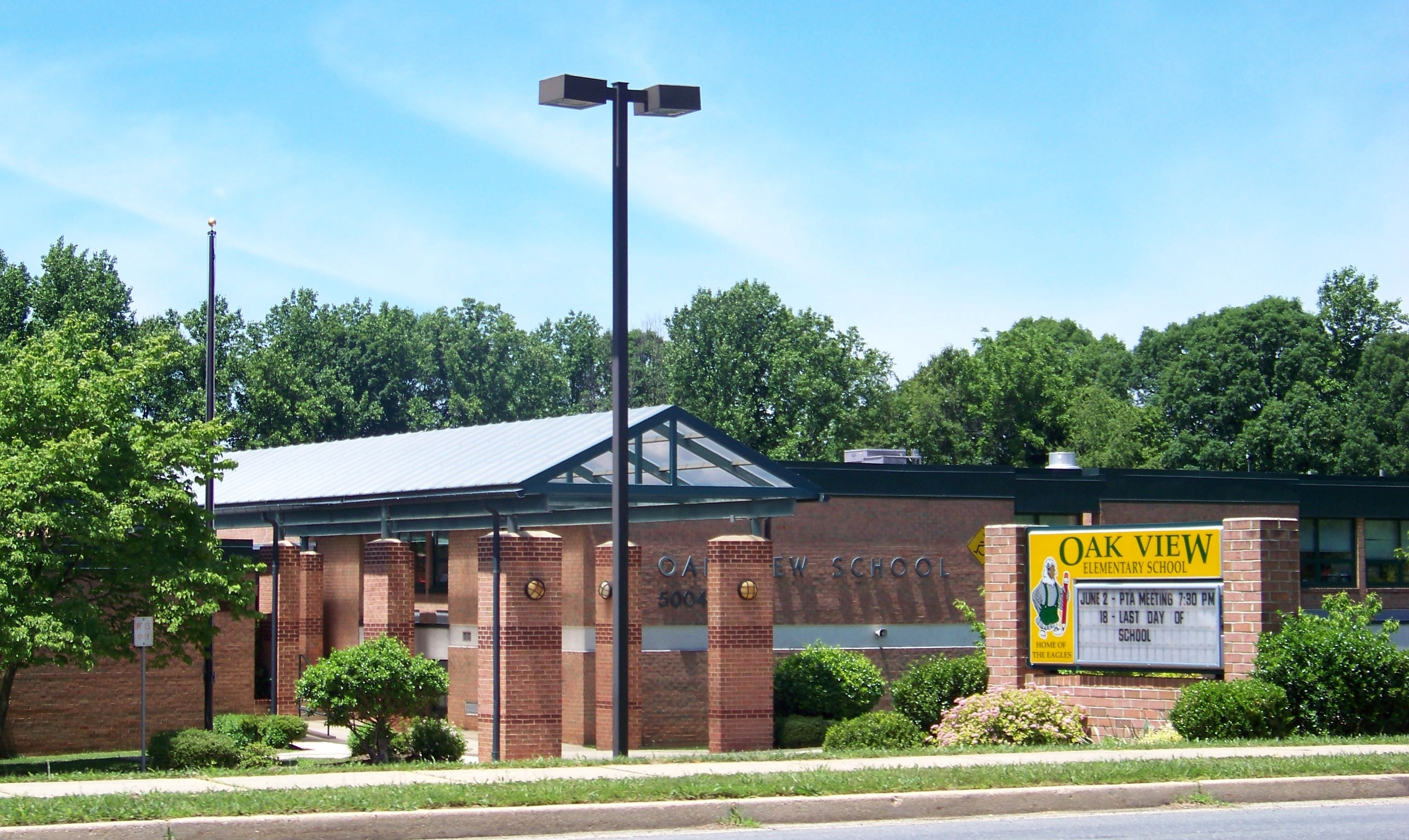
Oak View Elementary School in Fairfax

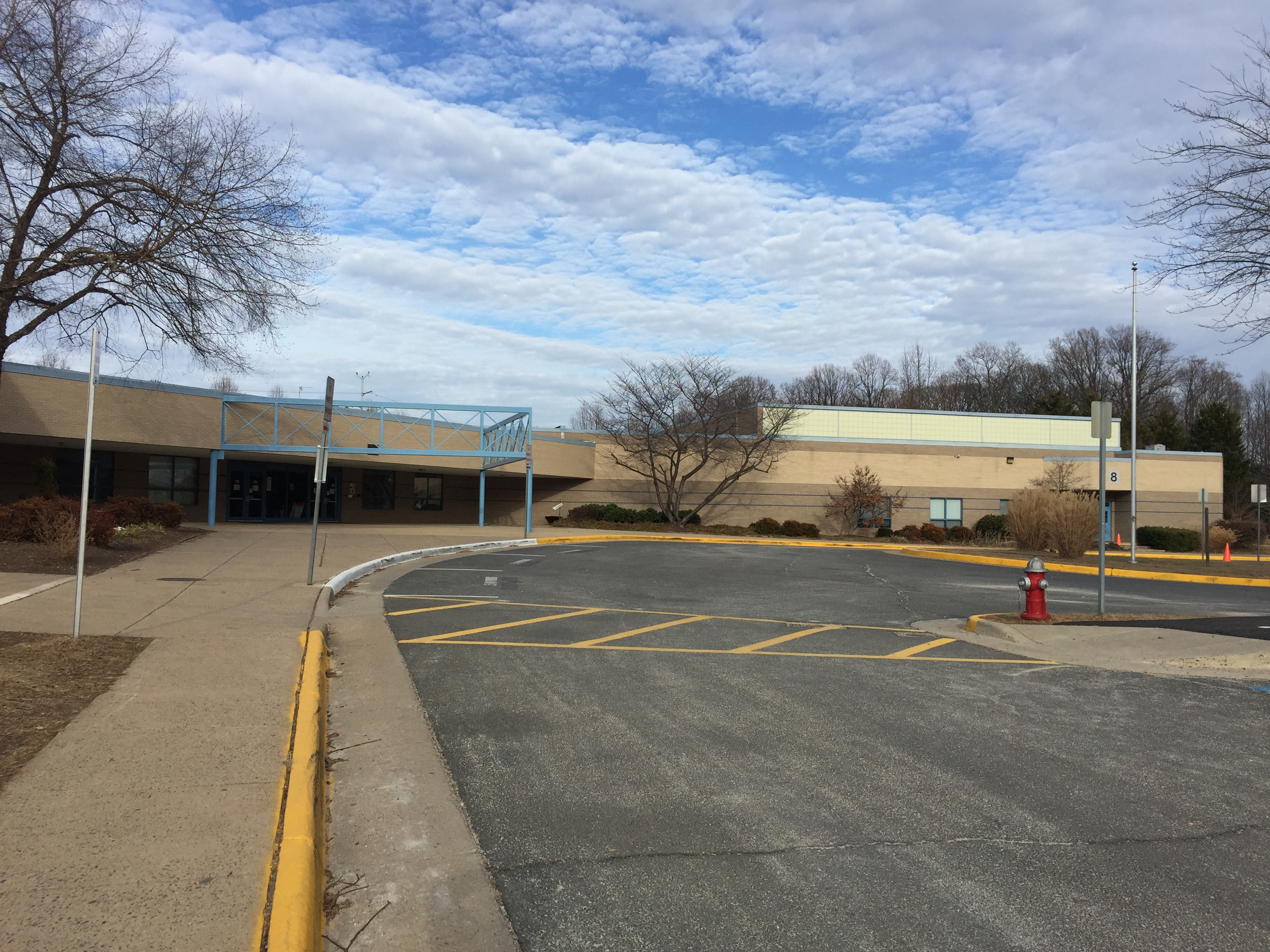
Willow Springs Elementary School in Fairfax

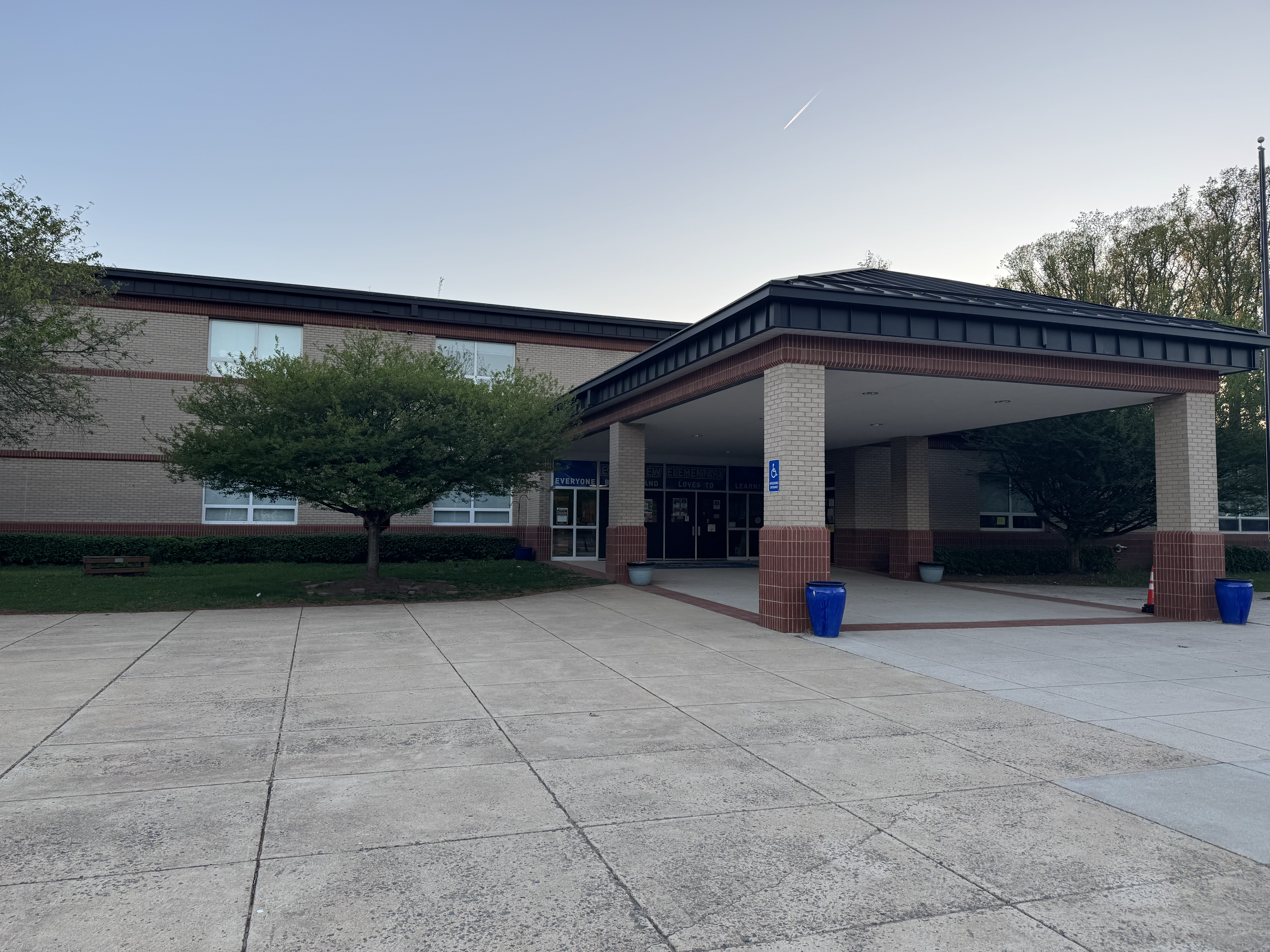
Eagle View Elementary School in Fairfax

- Buzz Aldrin Elementary School – Reston
- Annandale Terrace Elementary School - Annandale
- Louise Archer Elementary School – Vienna
- Armstrong Elementary School – Reston
- Bailey's Elementary School for the Arts and Sciences – Bailey's Crossroads
- Bailey's Upper Elementary School for the Arts and Sciences – Falls Church
- Beech Tree Elementary School – Falls Church
- Belle View Elementary School – Alexandria
- Belvedere Elementary School – Falls Church
- Bonnie Brae Elementary School – Fairfax
- Braddock Elementary School – Annandale
- Bren Mar Park Elementary School – Alexandria
- Brookfield Elementary School –Chantilly
- Bucknell Elementary School – Alexandria
- Bull Run Elementary School – Centreville
- Bush Hill Elementary School – Alexandria
- Camelot Elementary School – Annandale
- Cameron Elementary School – Alexandria
- Canterbury Woods Elementary School – Annandale
- Cardinal Forest Elementary School – West Springfield
- Centre Ridge Elementary School – Centreville
- Centreville Elementary School – Centreville
- Cherry Run Elementary School – Burke
- Chesterbrook Elementary School – McLean
- Churchill Road Elementary School – McLean
- Clearview Elementary School – Herndon
- Clermont Elementary School – Alexandria
- Coates Elementary School – Herndon
- Colin Powell Elementary School – Centreville
- Columbia Elementary School – Annandale
- Colvin Run Elementary School – Vienna
- Crestwood Elementary School – Springfield
- A. Scott Crossfield Elementary School – Herndon
- Cub Run Elementary School – Centreville
- Cunningham Park Elementary School – Vienna
- Daniels Run Elementary School – Fairfax
- Deer Park Elementary School – Centreville
- Dogwood Elementary School – Reston
- Dranesville Elementary School – Herndon
- Eagle View Elementary School – Fairfax
- Fairfax Villa Elementary School – Fairfax
- Fairhill Elementary School – Fairfax
- Fairview Elementary School – Fairfax Station
- Flint Hill Elementary School – Vienna
- Floris Elementary School – Herndon
- Forest Edge Elementary School – Reston
- Forestdale Elementary School – Springfield
- Forestville Elementary School – Great Falls
- Fort Belvoir Elementary School – Fort Belvoir
- Fort Belvoir Upper Elementary School – Fort Belvoir
- Fort Hunt Elementary School – Alexandria
- Fox Mill Elementary School – Herndon
- Franconia Elementary School – Alexandria
- Franklin Sherman Elementary School – McLean
- Freedom Hill Elementary School – Vienna
- Garfield Elementary School – Springfield
- Glen Forest Elementary School – Falls Church
- Graham Road Elementary School – Falls Church
- Great Falls Elementary School – Great Falls
- Greenbriar East Elementary School – Chantilly
- Greenbriar West Elementary School – Chantilly
- Groveton Elementary School – Alexandria
- Gunston Elementary School – Lorton
- William Halley Elementary School – Fairfax Station
- Haycock Elementary School – Falls Church
- Hayfield Elementary School – Alexandria
- Herndon Elementary School – Herndon
- Hollin Meadows Elementary School – Alexandria
- Hunt Valley Elementary School – Springfield
- Hunters Woods Elementary School for the Arts and Sciences – Reston
- Hutchison Elementary School – Herndon
- Hybla Valley Elementary School – Alexandria
- Island Creek Elementary School – Alexandria
- Keene Mill Elementary School – West Springfield
- Kent Gardens Elementary School – McLean
- Kings Glen Elementary School – Springfield
- Kings Park Elementary School – Springfield
- Lake Anne Elementary School – Reston
- Anthony T. Lane Elementary School – Alexandria
- Laurel Hill Elementary School – Lorton
- Laurel Ridge Elementary School – Fairfax
- Lees Corner Elementary School – Fairfax
- Lemon Road Elementary School – Falls Church
- Little Run Elementary School – Fairfax
- London Towne Elementary School – Centreville
- Lorton Station Elementary School – Lorton
- Lynbrook Elementary School – Springfield
- Mantua Elementary School – Fairfax
- Marshall Road Elementary School – Vienna
- Mason Crest Elementary School – Annandale
- McNair Elementary School – Herndon
- McNair Upper Elementary School – Herndon
- Mosaic Elementary School – Fairfax (formerly Mosby Woods)
- Mount Eagle Elementary School – Alexandria
- Mount Vernon Woods Elementary School – Alexandria
- Navy Elementary School – Fairfax
- Newington Forest Elementary School – Springfield
- North Springfield Elementary School – North Springfield
- Oak Hill Elementary School – Herndon
- Oak View Elementary School – Fairfax
- Oakton Elementary School – Oakton
- Olde Creek Elementary School – Fairfax
- Orange Hunt Elementary School – Springfield
- Parklawn Elementary School – Alexandria
- Pine Spring Elementary School – Falls Church
- Poplar Tree Elementary School – Chantilly
- Providence Elementary School – Fairfax
- Ravensworth Elementary School – Springfield
- Riverside Elementary School – Alexandria
- Rolling Valley Elementary School – West Springfield
- Rose Hill Elementary School – Alexandria
- Sangster Elementary School – Springfield
- Saratoga Elementary School – Springfield
- Shrevewood Elementary School – Falls Church
- Silverbrook Elementary School – Fairfax Station
- Sleepy Hollow Elementary School – Falls Church
- Spring Hill Elementary School – McLean
- Springfield Estates Elementary School – Springfield
- Stenwood Elementary School – Vienna
- Stratford Landing Elementary School – Fort Hunt
- Sunrise Valley Elementary School – Reston
- Terra Centre Elementary School – Burke
- Terraset Elementary School – Reston
- Timber Lane Elementary School – Falls Church
- Union Mill Elementary School – Clifton
- Vienna Elementary School – Vienna
- Virginia Run Elementary School – Centreville
- Wakefield Forest Elementary School – Annandale
- Waples Mill Elementary School – Oakton
- Washington Mill Elementary School – Alexandria
- Waynewood Elementary School – Alexandria
- West Springfield Elementary School
- Westbriar Elementary School – Vienna
- Westgate Elementary School – Falls Church
- Westlawn Elementary School – Falls Church
- Weyanoke Elementary School – Alexandria
- White Oaks Elementary School – Burke
- Willow Springs Elementary School – Fairfax
- Wolftrap Elementary School – Vienna
- Woodburn Elementary School – Falls Church
- Woodlawn Elementary School – Alexandria
- Woodley Hills Elementary School – Alexandria

=== Special education centers ===
- Burke School
- Camelot Center
- Cedar Lane School
- Davis Career Center
- Key Center
- Kilmer Center
- Mount Vernon Center
- Pulley Career Center
- Quander Road School

=== Interagency alternative schools ===
- Adult Detention Center
- Boys Probation House
- Foundations (formerly Girls Probation House)
- GRANTS (GED Readiness and New Technology Skills)
- Gunston School at South County
- Hillwood School at East County
- Independent Study Program
- Merrifield Day
- Nontraditional Career Readiness Academy (NCRA): West Potomac, Edison, Spring Village, and Falls Church
- Sager School
- Shelter Care II (formerly Less Secure Shelter)
- Transition Support Resource Center (TSRC): Annandale High School, Bryant Alternative High School, Fairfax High School, George C. Marshall High School, South County High School, South Lakes High School, Robinson Secondary School, Westfield High School

== Former schools ==
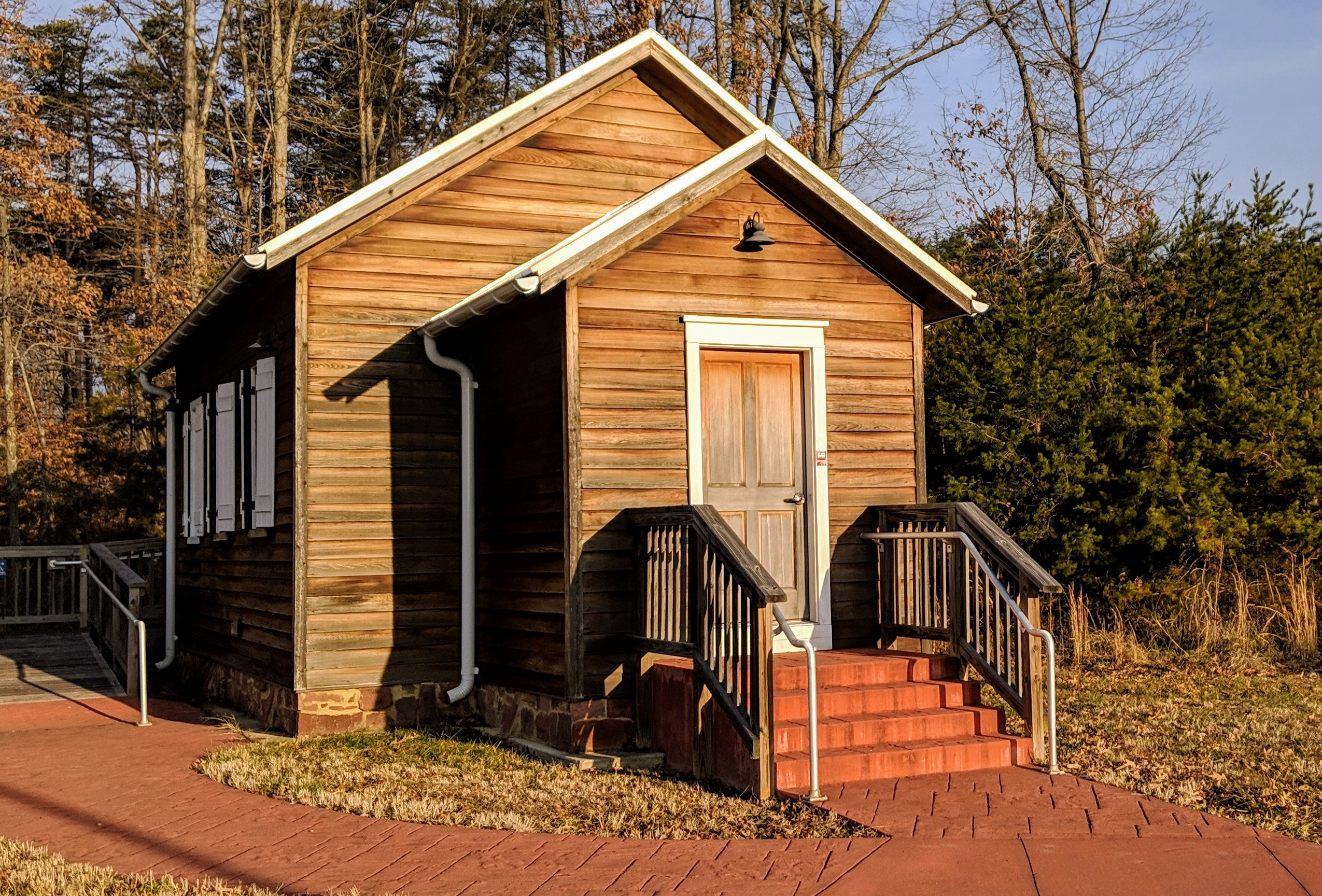
Crouch School House

- Cedar Lane Elementary School
- Clifton High School
- Clifton Elementary School
- Crouch School House
- Dunn Loring Elementary School
- Edsall Park Elementary School (now the Plum Center for Lifelong Learning)
- Green Acres Elementary School (now owned by the City of Fairfax Parks & Recreation)
- James Lee Elementary School (now the James Lee Community Center)
- Lewinsville Elementary School
- Pimmit Hills Elementary School (now the Pimmit Hills Center for Adult Education)
- Pine Ridge Elementary School
- Walnut Hill Elementary School (now the Leis Center)
- Westmore Elementary School

Schools for Black children:

- Laurel Grove Colored School
- Luther Jackson High School
- Cub Run Colored School
- Eleven Oaks Colored School (torn down, now the site of the Eleven Oaks housing development)
- Fort Hunt High School

== See also ==
- List of Fairfax County Public Schools middle schools
- List of school divisions in Virginia
