= Sono arsenic filter =

Water filter in Bangladesh

The Sono arsenic filter was invented in 2006 by Abul Hussam, who is a chemistry professor at George Mason University (GMU) in Fairfax, Virginia. It was developed to deal with the problem of arsenic contamination of groundwater. The filter is now in use in Hussam's native Bangladesh.

== Development ==
Farmers had been drinking fresh groundwater from wells, whereas previously they had had to use ponds and mudholes which were contaminated with bacteria and viruses. However, these wells were also contaminated with naturally occurring high concentrations of poisonous arsenic, causing skin ailments and cancers. Awareness of the problem developed through the 1990s.

Allan Smith, an epidemiologist at the University of California at Berkeley, observed that the arsenic problem affects millions of people worldwide:

You can't see it or taste or smell it. The idea that crystal-clear drinking water would end up causing lung disease in 20 or 30 years is a little weird. It's unbelievable to people.

— Solutions for a greener planet environmental chemistry by Marc Zimmer

Hussam developed his filter after years of testing hundreds of prototypes. The final version contains 20 pounds (9 kg) of shards of porous iron, which bonds chemically with arsenic. It also includes charcoal, sand and bits of brick. It filters nearly all arsenic from well water.

== Awards ==
Hussam was awarded the 2007 Grainger challenge Prize for Sustainability by the National Academy of Engineering. Hussam plans to use 70% of the $1 million engineering prize to distribute filters to needy communities.

== See also ==
- Backwashing
- Carbon filtering
- Distillation
- Filtration
- Reverse osmosis
- Sand separator
- Settling basin
- Water purification
