= Jack Dale (cricketer) =

English cricketer

Jack Hillen Dale (1901–1965) was an English cricketer who played for Northamptonshire between 1922 and 1928. He was born in Northampton on 29 October 1901 and died in Battle, Sussex on 28 April 1965. He appeared in nine first-class matches as a righthanded batsman who bowled right arm slow. He scored 323 runs with a highest score of 76 and took two wickets with a best performance of one for 19.
