= John Dale =

John Dale may refer to:

== Politicians ==
- John Dale (MP) (fl. 1529), English politician
- John Dale (Norwegian politician) (born 1940), Norwegian politician

== Sports ==
- John Dale (cricketer, born 1848) (1848–1895), English rower and cricketer
- John Dale (cricketer, born 1930) (1930–2016), English cricketer

== Others ==
- John Dale (doctor) (1885–1952), Australian medical practitioner
- John Gilbert Dale (1869–1926), English scientist, and political and trade union activist
- John Dale (writer) (born 1953), Australian author of crime fiction and true crime books
