= Abul Hussam =

American chemist

- Born: Kushtia, Bangladesh
- Education: PhD (chemistry); University of Dhaka; University of Pittsburgh
- Known for: Sono arsenic filter
- Scientific career
- Workplaces: George Mason University; Georgetown University; Case Western Reserve University

Abul Hussam (Bengali: আবুল হুসসাম) is the inventor of the Sono arsenic filter. He is a chemistry professor at George Mason University (GMU) in Fairfax, Virginia, and a member of advisory board at Shahjalal University of Science and Technology.

== Life and career ==
Hussam was born in Kushtia, and raised in Bangladesh. Hussam moved to the United States in 1978 for graduate studies. Later he received a doctorate in analytical chemistry and became a naturalized citizen of the US. He has spent much of his career trying to devise a solution to the problem of arsenic contamination of groundwater in eastern India and Bangladesh.

Hussam initially started working on this problem in 1993. His final innovation is a simple, maintenance-free system that uses sand, charcoal, bits of brick and shards of a type of cast iron. The filter removes almost every trace of arsenic from the well water. The wells brought fresh groundwater to farmers and others who previously had been drinking from bacteria- and virus-laced ponds and mudholes.

He also had to devise a way to find an accurate way to measure arsenic in water. This was achieved in the early of the mid-1990s.

The National Academy of Engineering announced on February 1, 2007, that the 2007 Grainger challenge prize for sustainability would go to Hussam. Hussam's invention is already in use today, preventing serious health problems in residents of the professor's native Bangladesh. This includes a $1 million award, which Hussam plans to use most of to distribute the filters to needy communities around the world.

Hussam said he plans to use 70 percent of his prize so the filters can be distributed to needy communities. He said 25 percent will be used for more research, and 5 percent will be donated to GMU.

The 2007 sustainability prize is funded by the Grainger Foundation of Lake Forest, Illinois, and the contest was set up to target the arsenic problem. Among the criteria for winning was an affordable, reliable and environmentally friendly solution to the arsenic problem that did not require electricity.

His older brother is Abul Hashem and his younger brothers are Dr. Abul Barkat, Dr. AKM Munir, and Md Nurul Azam.

== Education ==
- BSc (honors) in chemistry, University of Dhaka, 1975
- MSc in chemistry, University of Dhaka, 1976
- PhD in analytical chemistry from University of Pittsburgh, Pennsylvania, 1982.

== Professional positions ==
- Director, Center for Clean Water and Sustainable Technologies, George Mason University
- Professor, Department of Chemistry and Biochemistry, George Mason University
- Visiting research scholar at Georgetown University and at Case Western Reserve University.

== Scientific papers ==
Professor Hussam has published and presented over 100 scientific papers in international journals, proceedings, and books.

== Honors and awards ==
- Doctor of Science (D.Sc.) by University of Dhaka in 2009.
- Professor Hussam was awarded one of the highest engineering prizes known as the 2007 Grainger Challenge Prize for Sustainability from the US National Academy of Engineering (NAE) for the Sono arsenic filter which is now used by thousands of people in the affected areas of Bangladesh, Nepal, and India.
- He was recognized by the Time magazine with a Global Heroes of the Environment 2007 Award
- The Outstanding American by Choice Award by US Citizenship and Immigration Services in 2008
- Distinguished Alumni Award for "creativity, leadership, and accomplishments" by the Department of Chemistry, University of Pittsburgh
- His present research on the measurement of trace arsenic, aquatic chemistry of arsenic in groundwater, and the development of a simple arsenic filters has been recognized through international publications and accolades. His work is now described in chemistry and engineering text books and cited as one of the most significant contributions in water purification technologies.
