= Grainger challenge =

The Grainger challenge is a scientific competition to find an economical way to remove arsenic from arsenic-contaminated groundwater. This competition is being funded by the United States National Academy of Engineering and the Grainger Foundation and is meant to help provide safe drinking water to countries such as Bangladesh, India, and Cambodia.

In 2007, the winner of the Gold Award ($1,000,000) was Abul Hussam, for his invention of the Sono arsenic filter. The Silver Award ($200,000) was awarded to Arup K Sengupta for his invention and implementation of ArsenX^{np} hybrid anion exchange (HAIX) resin. The Children's Safe Drinking Water Program at Procter & Gamble (P&G), Cincinnati, received the Bronze Award of US$100,000 for the PUR™ Purifier of Water coagulation and flocculation water treatment system.
