= Jack D. Dale =

Superintendent of the Fairfax County Public Schools system
- In office 2004–2013
- Preceded by: Dan Domenech
- Succeeded by: Karen Garza

Superintendent of the Frederick County Public Schools system
- In office 1996–2004
- Succeeded by: Linda Burgee

Personal details
- Born: Seattle, Washington
- Spouse: Valerie
- Education: University of Washington

Jack D. Dale was the Superintendent of Fairfax County Public Schools, the public school system for Fairfax County, Virginia and the twelfth largest school system in the United States from 2004 to 2013.

Dale had previously served as the Superintendent of Frederick County, Maryland Public Schools from 1996 to 2004, and was named Maryland's Superintendent of the Year in 2000. He holds a Bachelor of Arts degree in mathematics and education; a Master's in educational administration; and a Doctorate in education from the University of Washington.

Dale is co-editor and author of the book: Creating Successful School Systems and has conducted workshops on teacher compensation systems for No Child Left Behind initiatives. He has also published papers in The Executive Educator; International Journal of Education Reform; American Association of School Personnel Administrators (AASPA) Research Brief; and SIRS Management Information.

During his time as Superintendent of Fairfax County Public Schools, Dale was criticized by some parents and students for his handling of various issues brought to the attention of the school system, including criticism by the child advocacy groups FAIRGRADE and SLEEP for refusing to change, respectively, the county's grading scale and school start-time policies (especially the 7:20 a.m. high school start time).

Despite some opposition, the Fairfax County Board of Education renewed his contract until June 2013 in September 2009. In September 2011 he announced that he would retire on June 30, 2013, when his contract ended.

== Controversy over disciplinary policies ==
Dale was also criticized for the Fairfax County school disciplinary system, which some blamed for the suicides of two students: Josh Anderson, of South Lakes High School, took his life in March 2009; and Nick Stuban, a student at W.T. Woodson High School, committed suicide on January 20, 2011. On February 11, 2011, Dale defended himself in a letter to the Fairfax County School Board and the Fairfax County Board of Supervisors. In that letter, Dale argued that the disciplinary system did not need to be reformed, and blamed Supervisor Catherine M. Hudgins for "unconscionable" actions and "furthering a falsehood" by associating the student's suicide with the disciplinary process that had "crushed" his spirit.
