= Lucius Linton Deck, Junior =

American educational administrator

- Born: 1929
- Died: July 3, 2015 (aged 85–86); Asheville, North Carolina, US
- Education: B.S., 1950 (Davidson College); M.A., 1955 (George Peabody College for Teachers); Ed.D., 1967 (Harvard University)
- Occupation: School administrator
- Employer(s): School districts: ACPS, MNPS, BCPS, OCPS, FCPS; Universities: University of Georgia, Vanderbilt University, University of West Georgia

Lucius Linton Deck, Junior (1929–2015) was a school administrator and serial superintendent of large school systems in the United States of America. Deck was also a teacher and professor at the University of Georgia, Vanderbilt University, and the University of West Georgia.

== Early life and education ==
Deck was born to Lucius Linton Deck, Senior, and Rosalie Deck (née Wootten) in 1929. He had one younger sibling named J. David Deck, who was an associate professor in the department of cell biology at the University of Virginia School of Medicine.

Deck graduated from Davidson College with a bachelor's degree in 1950, got a master's degree from the George Peabody College for Teachers in 1955 (before that school merged with Vanderbilt University), and got a doctorate in education from Harvard University in 1967.

Deck was "the first recipient of The Conroy Prize for outstanding leadership, awarded by the Harvard School of Education."

== Early career ==
Deck was assistant superintendent for instruction at the Alexandria City Public Schools from 1966 to 1967, "where he assisted with significant school desegregation planning and implementation."

Deck was on the education faculty at the University of Georgia before becoming assistant superintendent for instruction at the Metropolitan Nashville Public Schools.

Deck was a captain in the United States Army Reserves from 1950 to 1964.

== Superintendencies ==
From 1971 to 1982, Deck was superintendent of three school systems in Georgia, Florida, and Virginia. "He achieved national recognition for championing the use of technology to enhance student learning, professional development for teachers and administrators and expanded programs for students with disabilities."

=== Bibb County Public School District ===
Deck was the superintendent of the Bibb County School District in Georgia from June 1971 to June 1973.

=== Orange County Public Schools ===
Deck was the superintendent of the Orange County Public Schools in Florida from 1973 to 1980. During this time he was a reviewer for the Educational Administration Quarterly.

=== Fairfax County Public Schools ===
Deck was the superintendent of the Fairfax County Public Schools in Virginia, the eleventh largest school district in America, from 1980 to 1982, having been selected on 1979-11-19 from a field or more than 100 candidates. Deck took the position "to serve the last 18 months of a four-year term left vacant when Superintendent S. John Davis left the county to become Virginia's state superintendent of schools."

Deck's tenure was extended on 1981-01-08 with a four-year contract extension.

Deck resigned on 1982-06-24.

== Later career ==
After working as a superintendent, Deck was the managing director of the Center for Support of Professional Practice in Education (CSPPE) and a research professor of education at Vanderbilt University.

Deck also worked as a director at the Center for Creative Leadership.

Deck was also a professor and chair of the Educational Leadership and Professional Studies department in the College of Education at the University of West Georgia. There is a scholarship fund named after him at the university.
