= Stephanie Turner =

Stephanie Turner may refer to:

- Stephanie Turner (British actress)
- Stephanie Turner (American actress)
