= Walt Whitman Middle School =

Walt Whitman Middle School may refer to:

- Walt Whitman Middle School of Fairfax County Public Schools
- Whitman Middle School of Seattle Public Schools
- M.S. 246 Walt Whitman of New York City Public Schools
