= Irving Middle School =

Irving Middle School could be referring to the following:

- Washington Irving Middle School (Los Angeles) - Los Angeles, California
- Irving Middle School Nebraska - Lincoln, Nebraska
- Washington Irving Middle School (Springfield) - Springfield, Virginia
