= Luther Jackson High School =

Luther Porter Jackson Middle School

Location
- Fairfax County, Virginia
- Coordinates: 38.8683°N 77.2287°W

Information
- Other name: Luther Jackson Middle School (1965– )
- Type: Public, segregated
- Opened: 1954
- Closed: 1965
- School district: Fairfax County Public Schools
- Principal: Raven Jones
- Last updated: March 9, 2023

Luther Porter Jackson High School was a secondary school for Black students in Fairfax County, Virginia, United States, located at the Annandale-Dunn Loring-Merrifield corridor. A part of Fairfax County Public Schools, it was the county's first grade 7-12 school for Black children.

== History ==
Before the school was established, FCPS sent Black students to District of Columbia Public Schools (DCPS) schools and the Manassas Industrial School for Colored Youth, later the Manassas Regional High School, a vocational school. Schools in Washington, D.C., which took Black Fairfax County students included Armstrong Manual Training School, Cardozo High School, Dunbar High School, and Phelps Vocational Center.

Jackson, named after teacher Luther Porter Jackson, opened in 1954. At the time the school was in operation, about 41% of its students planned to attend colleges and universities.

Luther Jackson was a scholar who researched the Readjusters, a Black majority political party that led Virginia under William Mahone from 1879 to 1883.

The high school served as the counterpart to the then-Whites only Falls Church High School before closing in 1965 once the Fairfax School District had racially integrated. Luther Jackson Intermediate School, now known as Luther Jackson Middle School, opened on the former high school campus in September of that year.
