= Joe Rizzo =

Joe Rizzo may refer to:

- Joe Rizzo (American football)
- Joe Rizzo (baseball)
