= Stephanie Turner (American actress) =

American actress and filmmaker

- Born: Long Beach, California, U.S.
- Occupations: Actress, filmmaker
- Family: Norv Turner (father); Scott Turner (brother)

Stephanie Turner is an American actress and filmmaker. Turner's film Justine premiered at the 2019 Newport Beach Film Festival. Turner won Best Narrative Feature Performance at the 2019 Napa Valley Film Festival for her performance in the film. Turner was a director on Ava DuVernay's Queen Sugar on OWN.

Turner wrote, directed, produced, and starred in the 2019 Netflix film Justine, about a recent widow who becomes a caretaker to a child with spina bifida.

== Early life and education ==
Turner was born in Long Beach, California. She spent her early life in the Dallas metropolitan area. When she was ten years old, her family moved to the Washington metropolitan area, where she attended Oakton High School in Vienna, Virginia. She finished high school in San Diego. After graduating from high school, Turner studied acting at Baron Brown Studio in Santa Monica, California.

== Acting and film making career ==
Turner had roles in the movie Monster-in-Law as well as television series including 7th Heaven, Dirt, and CSI: NY.

In 2013, Turner began writing the script for Justine, a film about a newly widowed woman who becomes the caretaker for a girl with spina bifida. Turner and her husband started their own production company, Football Brat Productions, in order to produce the film. Justine, which stars Turner, Daisy Prescott, Darby Stanchfield, Glynn Turman, and Josh Stamberg, premiered at the Newport Beach Film Festival in 2019. Justine was distributed by Ava DuVernay's company Array. The film, which Turner wrote, directed, starred in, and produced, was favorably reviewed by The New York Times.

== Personal life ==
Turner is the daughter of National Football League coach Norv Turner. One of her brothers is football coach Scott Turner. Turner is married and has two children.
