= Miles Imlay =

Miles Imlay was a rear admiral in the United States Coast Guard.

== Biography ==
Miles Hopkins Imlay was born in Washington, D.C. on November 22, 1902. After graduating from Central High School in Washington, D.C., he attended Brown University for three semesters before entering the United States Coast Guard Academy. In 1926, Imlay graduated from the Academy and was commissioned as an ensign on May 15, 1926. His early assignments included serving aboard USCGC Seminole and USCGC Henley.

After serving aboard USCGC Ericsson and USCGC Mendota, Imlay returned to the Coast Guard Academy as an instructor and an assistant football coach. During his time stationed there, he also participated in training exercises aboard Mendota and USCGC Saranac. For the next few years, Imlay would go back and forth between being stationed at the Academy and sea duties such as executive officer and commanding officer of USCGC Tallapoosa.

Later, Imlay was deployed for World War II and would participate in the Normandy landings of Operation Overlord. For his service on D-Day, Imlay would receive the Silver Star. Among other decorations he received for his contributions during World War II were two awards of the Legion of Merit.

Imlay's post-war career included being the commanding officer of USCGC Eagle. He retired from the Coast Guard in 1956. Imlay died on March 12, 1975.
