= Selma Munter Borchardt =

American educator, lawyer and labor leader (1895–1968)

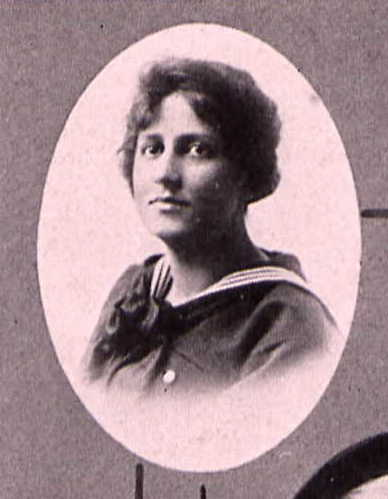
- Borchardt in 1916

Vice President of the American Federation of Teachers
- In office: 1924–1932; 1942–1954; 1958–1962

Personal details
- Born: December 1, 1895 Washington, D.C., U.S.
- Died: January 30, 1968 (aged 72) Washington, D.C., U.S.
- Education: Syracuse University (BA, BS); Washington College of Law (LL.B); Catholic University of America (MA)

Selma Munter Borchardt (December 1, 1895 – January 30, 1968) was an American educator, lawyer, labor leader and lobbyist. Between 1946 and 1951 she was a member of the committee that drafted the UNESCO charter. In 1935 she was nominated as a member of the National Advisory board of National Youth Administration by Franklin D. Roosevelt. She also served at the U.S Office of Education in the Wartime Education Commission (1941–1945).

== Biography ==
In the Machinists' Monthly Journal, September 1926

Born on December 1, 1895, in Washington, D.C., United States, Selma Munter Borchardt was the daughter of Newman Borchardt, a soldier and government official, and Sara Munter. Her family emigrated from Germany. In 1914 she graduated from Washington's Central High School. She continued her higher education at the Syracuse University, New York, where she earned an A.B. degree and a B.S. in education. Later, in 1933, she graduated with LL.B degree from the Washington College of Law (later became as American University Washington College of Law). Meanwhile, she got an A.M. degree in sociology from the Catholic University of America, Washington, DC, in 1937.

In 1922 she began her professional career as an English teacher in public schools of the District of Columbia, and continued until her retirement as head of the English department at Washington's Eastern High School in December 1960. She briefly worked as a supervisor of rural schools in Montgomery County, Maryland. During her long-standing service in public life, she tried to combine her careers as a teacher, lawyer, and labor lobbyist.

She was one of the early participants of the Teachers Union of the District of Columbia, where she actively served as its executive secretary. In 1924 she became the vice president of the American Federation of Teachers (AFT). From 1927 to 1946, she was the director of the World Federation of Education Associations. Between 1929 and 1955, she served as secretary of Education Committee of American Federation of Labor. In 1934 she was admitted to the Washington, D.C., Bar Association, and 10 years later, in 1944, she became the member of the Supreme Court bar.

As a legislative representative of the AFT, she played instrumental role in bringing “legislations to raise teachers' salaries, promote adult literacy, and provide health care for children and financial aid for students.”

She was associated with a number of professional institutions including the World Federation of Education Organizations, the American Association of University Women, and the Educational Planning Committee of Institute of World Studies.

She died on January 30, 1968, in Washington, D.C.

== Publications ==
Borchardt wrote a number of books, articles and policy notes related to education, labor rights and children's welfare. These include

=== Education ===
- Who Selects Our Textbooks (1926)
- The Relation of School Attendance Laws and Child Labor Laws (1930)
- Labor's Program for the Prevention of Juvenile and Youth Delinquency (1943)
- Getting and Keeping Children in School (1954)
- A Citizen's Responsibility for the Education of Children and Youth (1954)
- Program for Accelerated Training of Earlier School Dropout (1960)

=== Law ===
- The Teaching of International Cooperation in the Secondary Schools of the United States (1945)
- The Structure and Work of the International Teacher Organizations (1945)
- Balancing the Rights of the Individual and the Rights of Society (1960)
