= Oakton High School =

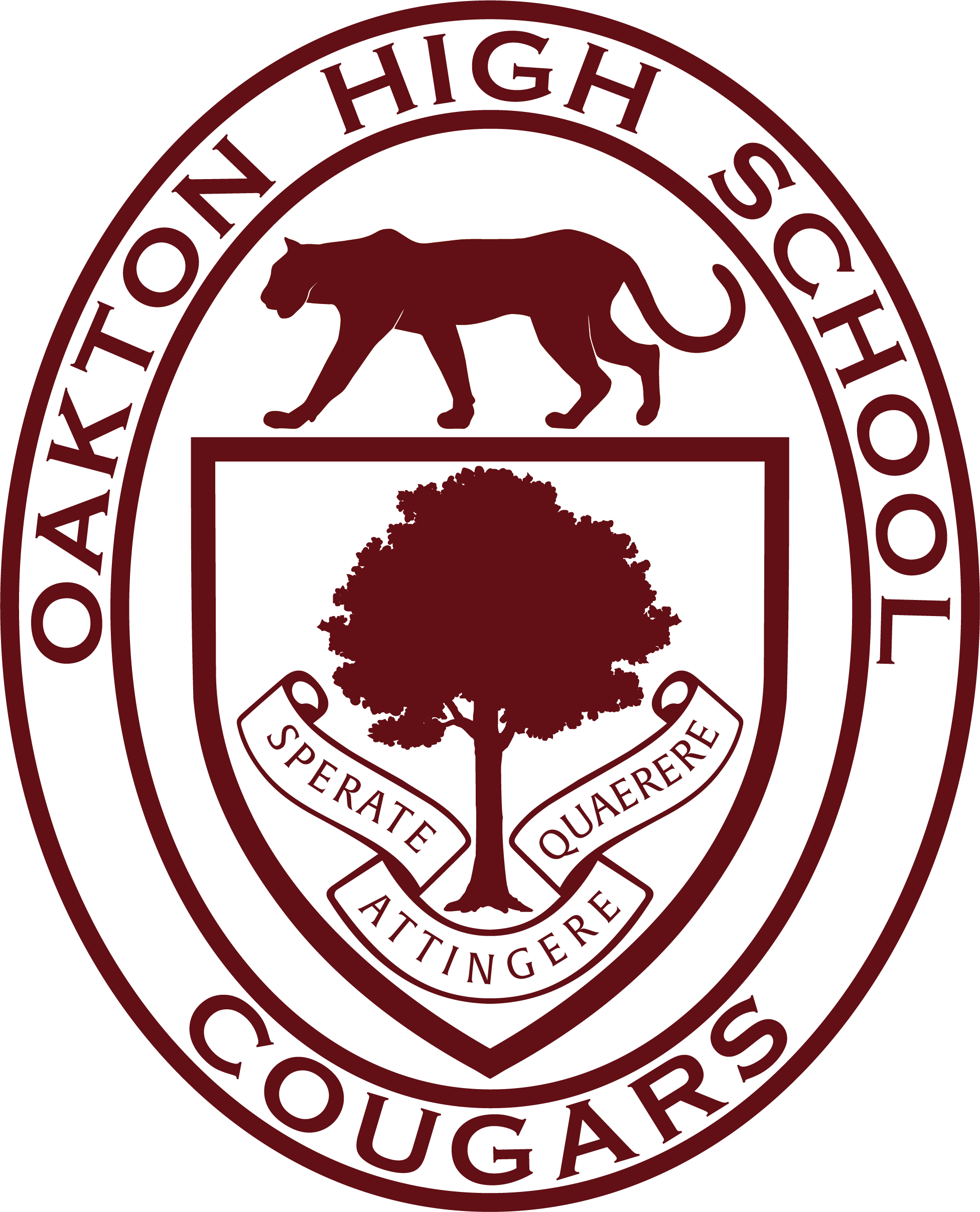

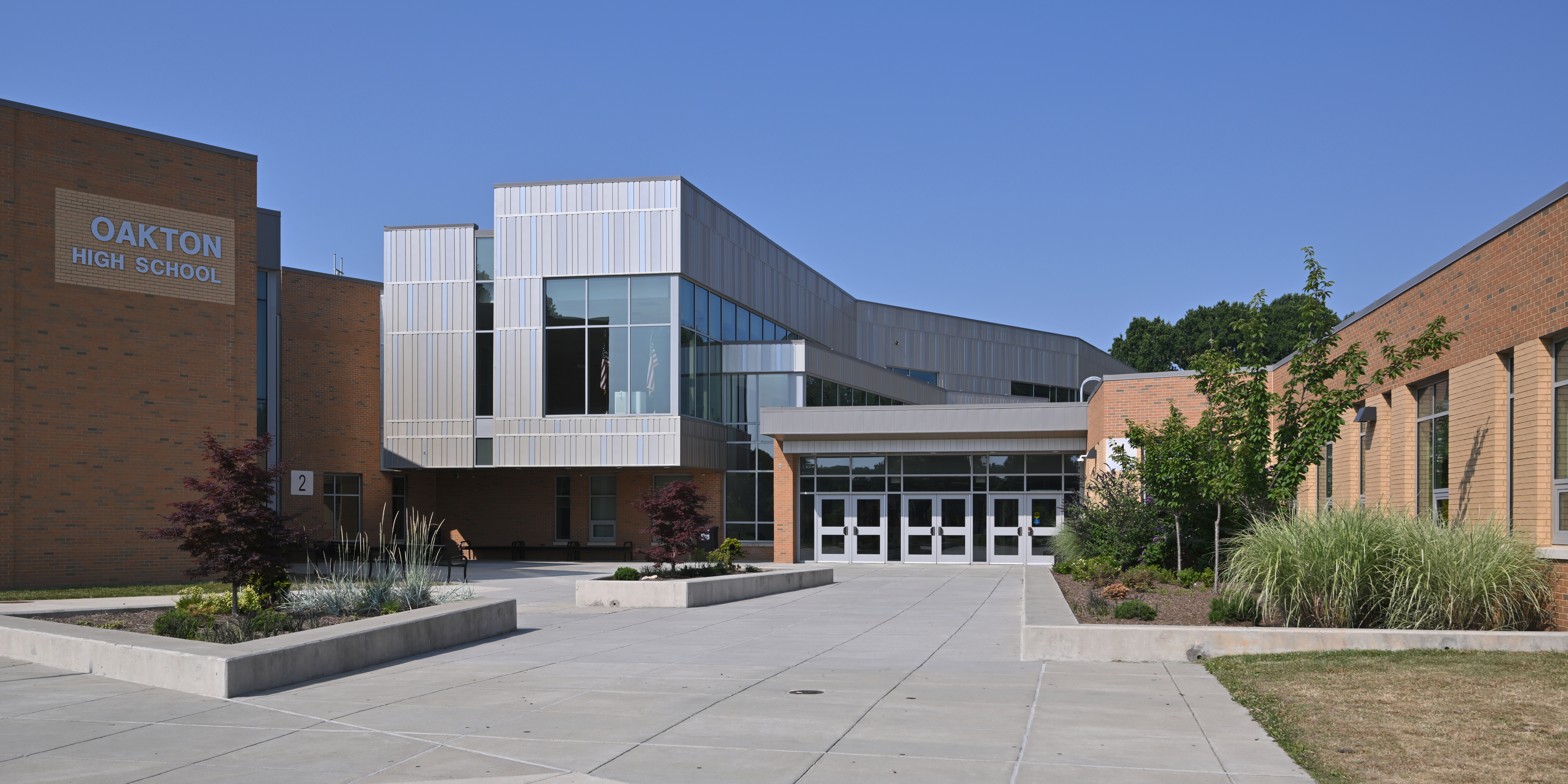
- Oakton High School in June 2024

Location
- 2900 Sutton Road; Vienna, Virginia 22181; United States; 38.8772°N 77.2828°W

Information
- Type: Public high school
- Motto: Sperate Quaerere Attingere
- Founded: March 25, 1967; 59 years ago
- School district: Fairfax County Public Schools
- Principal: Mark Merrell (Interim)
- Teaching staff: 201.03 (FTE) (2023–24)
- Grades: 9–12
- Gender: Co-educational
- Enrollment: 2,620 (2023–24)
- Student to teacher ratio: 13.03 (2023–24)
- Campus: Suburban: Large
- Colours: Burgundy; Gold
- Athletics conference: Concorde District; Northern Region
- Mascot: Cougars
- Rivals: Westfield Bulldogs; Madison Warhawks; Robinson Rams; South Lakes Seahawks; Chantilly Chargers
- Accreditation: Virginia Department of Education
- USNWR ranking: #199
- Newspaper: Oakton Outlook
- Yearbook: Paragon
- Feeder schools: Carson, Franklin, Jackson, and Thoreau middle schools
- Website: oaktonhs.fcps.edu

Oakton High School is a public high school in unincorporated Fairfax County, Virginia, in proximity to Vienna, Virginia, in the United States. It is part of Fairfax County Public Schools in Northern Virginia. As of the 2023–24 school year, it had 2,620 students, according to National Center for Education Statistics data.

== History ==
=== 20th century ===
Oakton High School was founded in 1967, in Vienna, Virginia. The original Oakton High School was located in the facility now used by Oakton Elementary School. When it opened, Oakton was the host facility for an IBM 1401, which was Fairfax County's first computer, and a computer curriculum, one of the first offered at the high school level, was available to full-time Oakton High School students and students from several other county high schools on a part-time basis. This system was retired in the early 1970s when Fairfax County installed an IBM 360 mainframe at the Annandale campus of Northern Virginia Community College.

In 1973, while W. T. Woodson High School in nearby Fairfax was being repaired after it was struck and damaged by a tornado, Woodson students attended the remainder of the school year in a split shift at Oakton High School with Oakton students attending in the morning and Woodson students attending in the afternoon.

=== 21st century ===
In 2009, the school suspended, and threatened to expel, a student for taking a birth control pill while on the school's premises. The incident was referenced during the August 3, 2009, episode of The Colbert Report, with the show satirically portraying the student as a "druggie".

== Organization ==
Oakton operates on a block schedule five days a week, alternating between "Burgundy" and "Gold" days.

=== Feeder schools ===
Crossfield Elementary School, Hunters Woods Elementary School, Mosaic Elementary School, Navy Elementary School, Marshall Road Elementary School, Oakton Elementary School, Waples Mill Elementary School, Franklin Middle School, Luther Jackson Middle School, Thoreau Middle School, and Rachel Carson Middle School are all feeder schools into Oakton High School.

== Admissions ==
Demographics
	2017–18		2018–19		2019–20	
Subgroup	Count	%	Count	%	Count	%
All students	2652	100.0%	2750	100.0%	2744	100.0%
Female	1294	48.8%	1322	48.1%	1312	47.8%
Male	1358	51.2%	1428	51.9%	1432	52.2%
American Indian	10	0.4%	5	0.2%	5	0.2%
Asian	779	29.4%	858	31.2%	887	32.3%
Black	129	4.9%	127	4.6%	138	5.0%
Hispanic	294	11.1%	302	11.0%	306	11.2%
Native Hawaiian	6	0.2%	7	0.3%	6	0.2%
White	1299	49.0%	1300	47.3%	1235	45.0%
Multiple races	135	5.1%	151	5.5%	167	6.1%
Students with disabilities	277	10.4%	294	10.7%	269	9.8%
Students without disabilities	2375	89.6%	2456	89.3%	2475	90.2%
Economically disadvantaged	340	12.8%	405	14.7%	301	11.0%
Not economically disadvantaged	2312	87.2%	2345	85.3%	2443	89.0%
English learners	308	11.6%	352	12.8%	290	10.6%
Not English learners	2344	88.4%	2398	87.2%	2454	89.4%
Homeless	7	0.3%	3	0.1%	5	0.2%
Military connected	15	0.6%	39	1.4%	46	1.7%
Foster care	2	0.1%	2	0.1%	1	0.0%

== Academics ==
=== Curriculum ===
The school offers various elective courses and allows students to participate in academy courses, including courses hosted by other schools at other school sites. Elective courses include psychology, various engineering courses, journalism, video production, accounting, multivariable calculus with linear algebra, astronomy, and five foreign languages.

Oakton offers an Advanced Placement (AP) program and a large variety of AP classes in major subject areas, including English, Social Studies, Science, Foreign Languages, Math, Performing Arts, and Fine Arts. Post-AP courses, including multivariable calculus and linear algebra and computer science data structures, are available to sufficiently advanced students.

=== Virginia Index of Performance (VIP) awards ===
Oakton High School is a frequent recipient of the annual Virginia Index of Performance (VIP) awards, which, since 2007, recognize advanced learning and achievement and are awarded by the Governor of Virginia and the Virginia Department of Education.

Virginia Index of Performance Awards
Award	Year(s) earned
Governor's Excellence Award	2008, 2010, 2011
Board of Education Excellence Award	2009, 2012, 2015–2019
Board of Education Distinguished Achievement Award (Note: From 2008–2012, the VIP Board of Education Distinguished Achievement Award was known as the Competence to Excellence Award.)	2014

=== U.S. News & World Report Best High Schools rankings ===
In 2024, U.S. News & World Report ranked Oakton #199 nationally among U.S. public high schools. In the same report, Oakton was ranked fourth-best among Virginia high schools.

US News & World Report Best High Schools
Year	National	Virginia	Reference
2012	165	9	
2013	118	6	
2014	111	5	
2015	158	6	
2016	162	5	
2017	198	4	
2018	247	6	
2019	173	4	
2020	503	11	
2022	282	6	
2024	199	4	

=== Standardized testing ===
Oakton High School is a fully accredited high school based on Virginia's Standards of Learning tests. The average SAT score in 2006 for Oakton High School was 1,703 (568 in Critical Reading, 578 in Math, and 557 in Writing). In 2022, SAT scores at Oakton High School were the fourth-highest out of all Fairfax County high schools, and SAT scores at Oakton High School exceeded both national and state averages.

== Extracurricular activities ==
=== Athletics ===
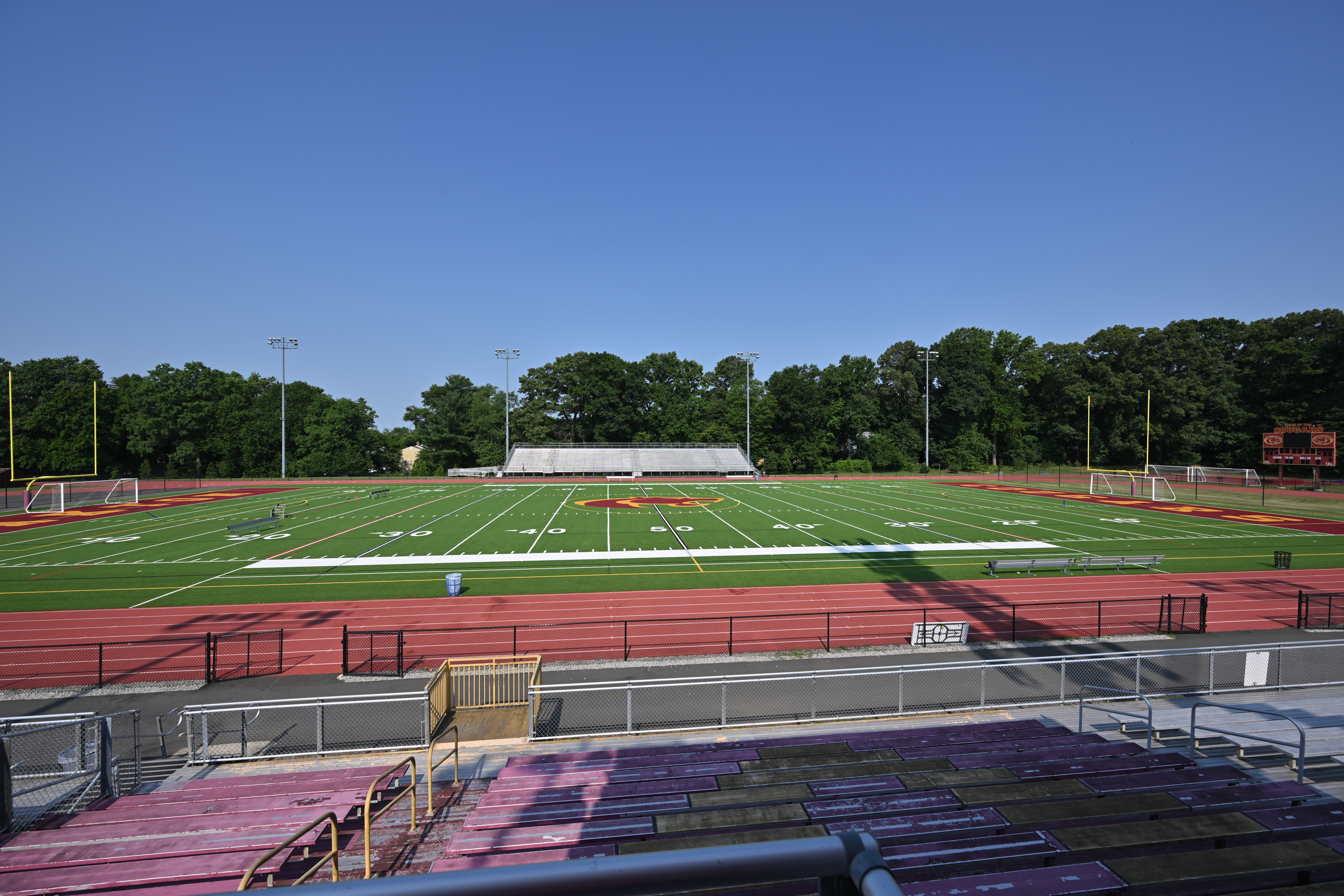
The Oakton High School football field in June 2024

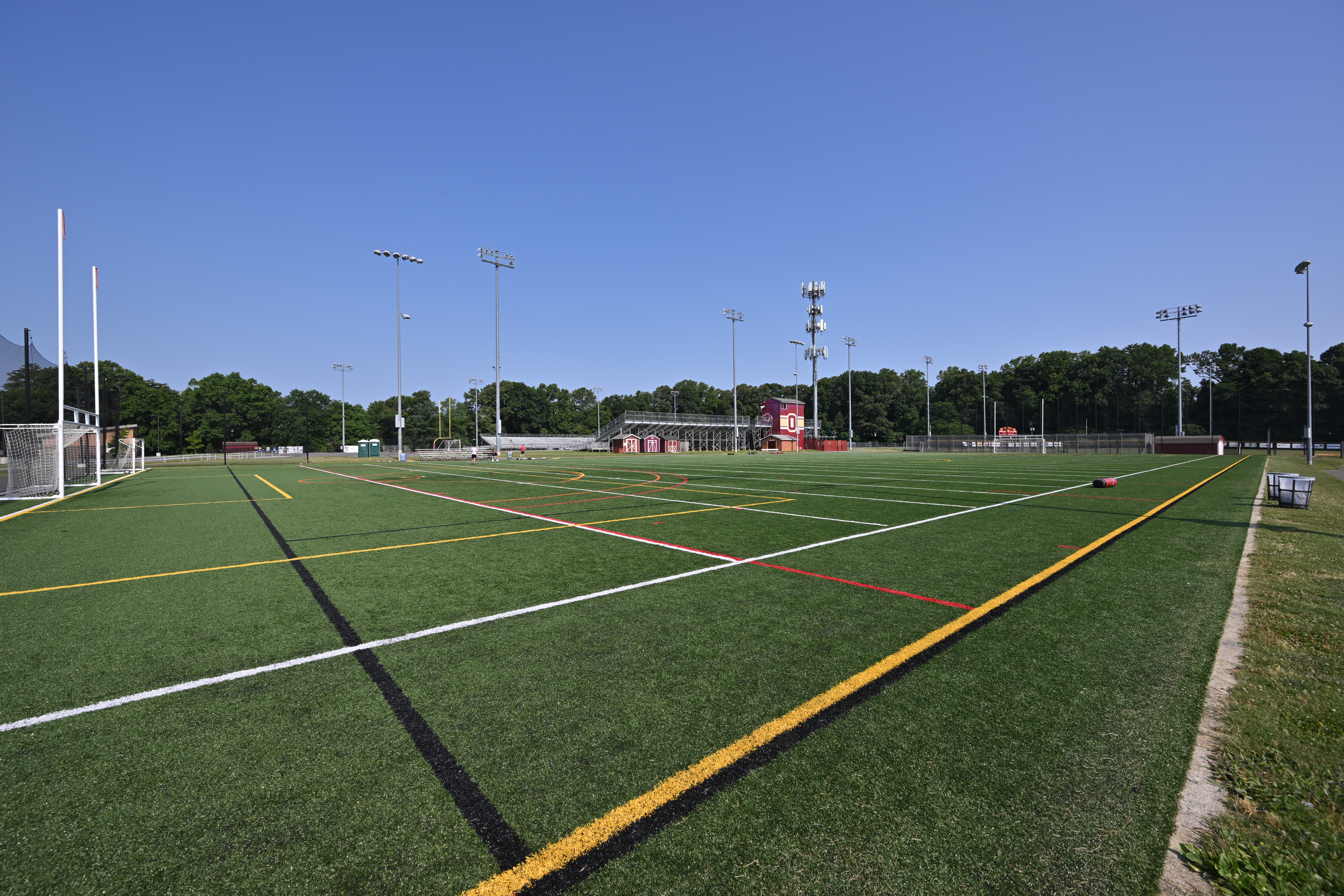
The Oakton High School soccer field in June 2024

Oakton is a member of the VHSL Group 6A North Region and the Northern Region of the Virginia High School League. Its cross country, football, baseball, lacrosse, and men's swimming teams have won Virginia state titles. Oakton has teams for club sports, such as crew and ice hockey. The Oakton Ice Hockey Club plays in the Northern Virginia Scholastic Hockey League (NVSHL).

==== State champions and recognitions ====
Virginia State Championships (team)
Year	Sport/activity
1978	AAA Boys Cross Country
1985	AAA Boys Golf
1990	AAA Boys Swimming and Diving
1991–92	AAA Theater
1992	Boys Lacrosse (Note: Although Oakton was the state champion for boys lacrosse in 1992 and from 2003–05, those titles were unofficial.)
1993	AAA Girls Gymnastics
1996	AAA Creative Writing - Folder
1998	AAA Creative Writing - Folder
1998	AAA Boys Cross Country
1999	AAA Creative Writing - Folder
2000	AAA Baseball
2003	Boys Lacrosse
2004	Boys Lacrosse
2005	AAA Boys Cross Country
2005	AAA Football Division 6
2005	Boys Lacrosse
2006	Girls Lacrosse (Unclassified)
2007	Girls Lacrosse (Unclassified)
2008	Girls Lacrosse (Unclassified)
2008	AAA Boys Cross Country
2010	AAA Boys Swim and Dive
2012	AAA Girls Basketball
2012	AAA Girls Swim and Dive
2012	Girls Lacrosse (Unclassified)
2013	6A Girls Cross Country

Virginia State Runner-Up (team)
Year	Sport/competition
1982	AAA Baseball
1983	AAA Boys Golf
1990	AAA Softball
1998	AAA Girls Gymnastics
1999	AAA Boys Soccer
2001	AAA Girls Basketball
2001	AAA Softball
2002	AAA Girls Outdoor Track
2002	AAA Football Division 6
2005	AAA Girls Cross Country
2006	AAA Baseball
2006	Boys Lacrosse (Unclassified)
2006	AAA Boys Cross Country
2007	AAA Boys Swimming and Diving
2007	AAA Girls Cross Country
2008	AAA Boys Swimming and Diving
2008	Boys Lacrosse (Unclassified)
2009	AAA Girls Basketball
2009	AAA Boys Cross Country
2012	AAA Girls Cross Country

Virginia Honor Band
Year	Notes
1989–90	First in the history of the school
1992–93	
1994–95	
1996–96	First-time repeat recognition
1996–97	
1997–98	
1998–99	
1999–2000	
2000–01	
2001–02	10th year recognition
2002–03	
2003–04	
2004–05	
2006–07	
2007–08	15th year recognition
2008–09	
2009–10	
2010–11	
2011–12	
2013–14	20th year recognition
2015–16	
2016–17	
2017–18	
2018–19	

Virginia State Championships (individual)
Year	Sport/competition	Name
1971	AAA Girls Tumbling (Gymnastics)	Diane Friedman
1972	AAA Girls Tumbling (Gymnastics)	Diane Friedman
1973	AAA Girls Original Oratory (Forensics)	Carolyn Davis
1977	AAA Boys Outdoor Two Mile Run (Track)	Jim Hill
1977	AAA Individual Boys Golf	Tony Deluca
1978	AAA Boys Pole Vault (Track)	Troy Nieves
1978	AAA Boys Outdoor Two Mile Run (Track)	Jim Hill
1978	AAA Girls Prose Reading (Forensics)	Jacqueline Lucid
1978	AAA Individual Boys Cross Country	James Hill
1979	AAA Boys Pole Vault (Track)	Troy Nieves
1979	AAA Boys Indoor 3200m Run (Track)	Jim Hill
1979	AAA Boys Outdoor Two Mile Run (Track)	Jim Hill
1981	AAA Boys Original Oratory (Forensics)	Bob Stankey
1982	AAA 167 lb Weight Class (Wrestling)	Jeff Palmucci
1984	AAA Girls Vault (Gymnastics)	Angel Bursenos
1984	AAA Boys Singles (Tennis)	Lee Bell
1985	AAA Individual Boys Golf	Chris Turner
1986	AAA Boys High Jump (Track)	David Daigler
1989	AAA Boys Doubles (Tennis)	Finch/Miller
1992	AAA Girls Beam Co-champion (Gymnastics)	Kristi Van Buren
1993	AAA Girls Indoor 3200m Run (Track)	Keri Gray
1994	AAA 140 lb Weight Class (Wrestling)	John McManus
1994	AAA Spelling (Forensics)	Richard Allen
1996	AAA Spelling (Forensics)	Amy Hegan
1997	AAA 215 lb Weight Class (Wrestling)	Brian Welch
1997	AAA Essay (Creative Writing)	George Kraus
1998	AAA Boys Outdoor 800m Run (Track)	Andrew MacLeod
1998	AAA Poetry (Creative Writing)	Maria Ahmad
1998	AAA Short Story (Creative Writing)	Becky Olsen
1999	AAA Boys Outdoor High Jump (Track)	Teddy Presley
1999	AAA Boys Outdoor 3200m Run (Track)	Jacob Frey
1999	AAA Short Story (Creative Writing)	Courtney Davis
2000	AAA Boys 200 Medley Relay (Swimming)	Oakton (Note: Relay teams are considered individuals in this context.)
2000	AAA Boys 50 Freestyle (Swimming)	Mike Sihler
2000	AAA Boys 100 Freestyle (Swimming)	Mike Ott
2000	AAA Boys 200 Freestyle Relay (Swimming)	Oakton
2000	AAA Girls Outdoor High Jump (Track)	Bonnie Meekins
2000	AAA Girls Outdoor 3200m Relay (Track)	Oakton
2000	AAA Individual Girls Cross Country	Keira Carlstrom
2001	AAA Boys 200 Individual Medley (Swimming)	Mike Ott
2001	AAA Boys Doubles (Tennis)	Wolfe/Tsai
2001	AAA Boys Indoor 3200m Run (Track)	Matt Maline
2001	AAA Boys Outdoor 1600m Run (Track)	Matt Maline
2001	AAA Girls Outdoor 1600m Run (Track)	Keira Carlstrom
2001	AAA Individual Girls Cross Country	Keira Carlstrom
2002	AAA Boys 200 Individual Medley (Swimming)	Mike Ott
2002	AAA Boys 100 Freestyle (Swimming)	Mike Ott
2002	AAA Girls Indoor High Jump (Track)	Bonnie Meekins
2002	AAA Girls Indoor 1600m Run (Track)	Keira Carlstrom
2002	AAA Girls Outdoor Long Jump (Track)	Bonnie Meekins
2002	AAA Girls Outdoor High Jump (Track)	Bonnie Meekins
2002	AAA Girls Outdoor 1600m Run (Track)	Keira Carlstrom
2003	AAA Boys 100 Freestyle (Swimming)	Mike Ott
2003	AAA News/Feature Photo (Newspaper)	Jennifer Cubas
2003	AAA Student Life Spread (Yearbook)	Henricka Hamler, Arushi Phull
2003	AAA Sports Spread (Yearbook)	Megan Koster
2003	AAA People Spread (Yearbook)	Melissa Leong
2004	AAA Girls Indoor 3200m Relay (Track)	Oakton
2005	AAA Girls Indoor 1600m Run (Track)	Danielle Light
2005	AAA Boys Outdoor 3200m Run (Track)	Jason Vick
2005	AAA Girls Outdoor 3200m Relay (Track)	Oakton
2006	AAA Poetry (Creative Writing)	Christine Williams
2007	AAA Individual Boys Golf	Danny Kim
2007	Individual Girls Golf (Unclassified)	Amanda Steinhagen
2008	AAA Boys Indoor 1600m Run (Track)	Joe LoRusso
2008	AAA Boys Outdoor 1600m Run (Track)	Joe LoRusso
2008	AAA News: Straight News/News Feature/Sports News (Newspaper)	Chris Weil
2008	AAA Feature: In-Depth/Informative (including Sports) (Newspaper)	Matt Johnson, Erica Wohlleben
2008	AAA Concept Packaging (Yearbook)	Oakton (Note: The entire yearbook staff is considered an entity in this context.)
2009	VHSL State Journalist of the Year	Matt Johnson
2009	AAA Boys 200 Freestyle (Swimming)	Bradley Phillips
2009	AAA Classic Policy Debate	Alexandra Kralick, Gabrielle Tate
2010	AAA Boys 200 Freestyle (Swimming)	Bradley Phillips
2010	AAA Boys 400 Freestyle (Swimming)	Bradley Phillips
2010	AAA Boys 200 IM (Swimming)	KJ Park
2010	AAA Boys 100 Breaststroke (Swimming)	KJ Park
2010	AAA Boys 400 Freestyle Relay (Swimming)	Philip Hu, Chris Megaw, Bradley Phillips, KJ Park
2010	AAA Girls 200 IM (Swimming)	Kaitlin Pawlowicz
2010	AAA Boys 100 Butterfly (Swimming)	Kaitlin Pawlowicz

=== Bands ===
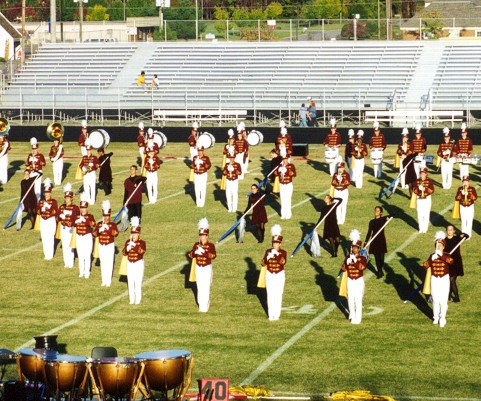
The Oakton High School marching band at the Lee-Davis Invitational competition in 2001

The Oakton Band program consists of a marching band, two concert bands, two jazz bands, a winter color guard, a drumline program, and several guitar classes and ensembles.

Oakton has been recognized as a Virginia Honor Band, the highest award for high school band programs, 23 times, including 11 consecutive years from 1995 to 2005. The award is given to bands that receive superior marks for marching and concert performances of the top band. The marching band has won other awards at competitions throughout the country and has been featured in parades and professional football games. The concert bands have made many appearances at Fiesta-val competitions in Chicago, Myrtle Beach, Orlando, and Toronto.

Oakton High School hosts the Oakton Classic marching band competition, a fundraiser. The Classic has been held annually, usually in October, since 1986, with a gap year in 2012.

=== Chorus ===
Oakton High School has four regular in-school choruses; Oakton Singers, Soprano Alto Chorale, Treble Chorus, Bel Canto, and Tenor Bass Chorus. The department also has three after-school specialty groups: jazz choir, men's a cappella (the Accents), and women's a cappella (The Actaves). Both a cappella groups are student-run.

=== Honor Council ===
Oakton High School has a student-led Honor Council. The role of the Honor Council is to promote honesty and integrity throughout Oakton High School while enforcing the Oakton academic honor code. The Oakton HS Honor Council has two processes for students suspected of breaking the honor code: the Punitive Council or Restorative Justice.

=== Orchestra ===
The Oakton High School strings program consists of four orchestras, ordered in decreasing difficulty level: the Chamber Orchestra, the Philharmonic Orchestra, the Symphonic Orchestra, and the Concert Orchestra.

The Chamber Orchestra participated in the Orchestra America National Festival in Indianapolis, part of the Music for All National Festival, in 2008. The orchestra applied and was accepted in 2007 and prepared an approximately 45-minute concert consisting of three pieces. On March 1, 2008, the Chamber Orchestra performed its selections at the Hilbert Circle Theatre, home of the Indianapolis Symphony Orchestra. Later that year, the Chamber Orchestra was accepted to perform at the American String Teachers Association National Conference, which took place in March 2009 in Atlanta. The group placed fourth, the highest ranking of a non-magnet, non-music school.

In 2022, the Oakton Theatre Department performed Peter Pan.

=== Performing arts ===
Oakton's Performing Arts Department, which includes band, choral, orchestral, and theatre arts departments, regularly earns distinction as one of the premier performing arts programs in the area. In 2008, the performing arts department won the Blue Ribbon Award, a result of Superior ratings for all Band, Choral, and Orchestra groups in state festivals.

=== Publications ===
Oakton's Publications Department produces a newspaper, The Outlook, a yearbook called Paragon, and a literary magazine, Opus. In October 2006, both The Outlook and Paragon received Trophy-Class honors at the Virginia High School League, with a rating of Superior. In April 2008, Paragon received a Pacemaker award, one of the highest honors in high school journalism, as well as 8th in best of show. The Outlook placed 6th in best of show.

The school used to have a radio club, Fat Cat Radio, and a daily television show, Cougar News. Every Friday, Oakton on Air, Oakton's student-led news show, is broadcast by teachers during the day's first period.

=== Theatre ===
The school's drama program has put on Arsenic and Old Lace, The Wizard of Oz, and other plays and musicals. The 2007–08 season included The Importance of Being Earnest, You're a Good Man, Charlie Brown and Into the Woods. The 2008–09 season included The Foreigner.

Performances usually occur in the Robert "Skip" Bromley Auditorium, dedicated in 2008.

== Campus ==
Like most Fairfax County schools, the building is of considerable size, consisting of two stories to accommodate its large population of students. The school has separate hallways for individual subjects. English classes are predominantly on the second floor; History, Math, and Science classes are on both floors. Oakton High school is within walking distance of the Vienna Metro Station. Oakton High School began renovations in June 2018, which were completed in May 2023. The renovation modernized classrooms and science laboratories and expanded student common areas. Outdoor improvements included updated athletic facilities and improved parking and traffic circulation around the campus.

== Notable alumni ==
List of notable alumni of Oakton High School
Name	Class Year	Notability	Ref.
Casey Beathard	1984	country music songwriter	
Danny Burmeister	1982	former professional football player, Washington Redskins	
Zachary Adam Chesser	2008	pleaded guilty in February 2011 to aiding a terrorist organization	
Eugene Chung	1986	former professional football player, Indianapolis Colts, Jacksonville Jaguars and New England Patriots	
John Cochran	2005	winner, Survivor: Caramoan in 2011	
Keira D'Amato	2002	women's-only American 10-mile road race record holder	
Serena Deeb	2004	professional wrestler	
Mark Emblidge	1971	former president, Virginia Board of Education	
Jimmy Filerman	2015	professional soccer player, Maryland Bobcats FC	
Jacob Frey	1999	mayor, Minneapolis, Minnesota	
J. D. Gibbs	1987	former stock car racing driver and co-owner, Joe Gibbs Racing	
Jared Green	2007	former professional football player, Carolina Panthers, Dallas Cowboys, and Oakland Raiders	
Cody Grimm	2005	former professional football player, Tampa Bay Buccaneers	
Jim Hill	1979	former distance runner, World Athletics Championships	
Michaele Holt	1984	noted 2009 party crasher at a White House state dinner hosted by President Obama	
Fred Kacher	1986	Vice Admiral U.S. Navy, Director of the Joint Staff	
Theodore Ku-DiPietro	2020	professional soccer player, D.C. United	
Ammar Malik	2006	professional songwriter, Maroon 5 and Gym Class Heroes	
Daphne Martschenko	2010	Stanford student athlete and winner of two gold medals, including the NCAA Division I rowing championship	
Nyambi Nyambi		actor, Mike & Molly, The Good Fight	
Nathan Pacheco	1998	professional singer, Katherine Jenkins and Yanni	
Sean Parker	1998 (transferred)	co-founder of Napster, founder of Plaxo, former president of Facebook	
Noah Pilato	2014	soccer player, Greenville Triumph SC in USL League One	
Joe Rizzo	2016	professional baseball player, Detroit Tigers	
Dave Sharrett	1999	Iraq War casualty in 2008	
Jasmine Thomas	2007	former WNBA professional basketball player	
Scott Turner	2001	pass game coordinator, Las Vegas Raiders	
Stephanie Turner		actress, director, and producer, Justine, a Netflix film	
Glenn M. Walters	1975	20th president, The Citadel, former 34th Assistant Commandant of the Marine Corps, retired U.S. Marine Corps four-star general	
Michael Wardian		marathoner and ultramarathoner	
Trey Watts	2009	former professional football player, Los Angeles Rams	
