= Cardozo Education Campus =

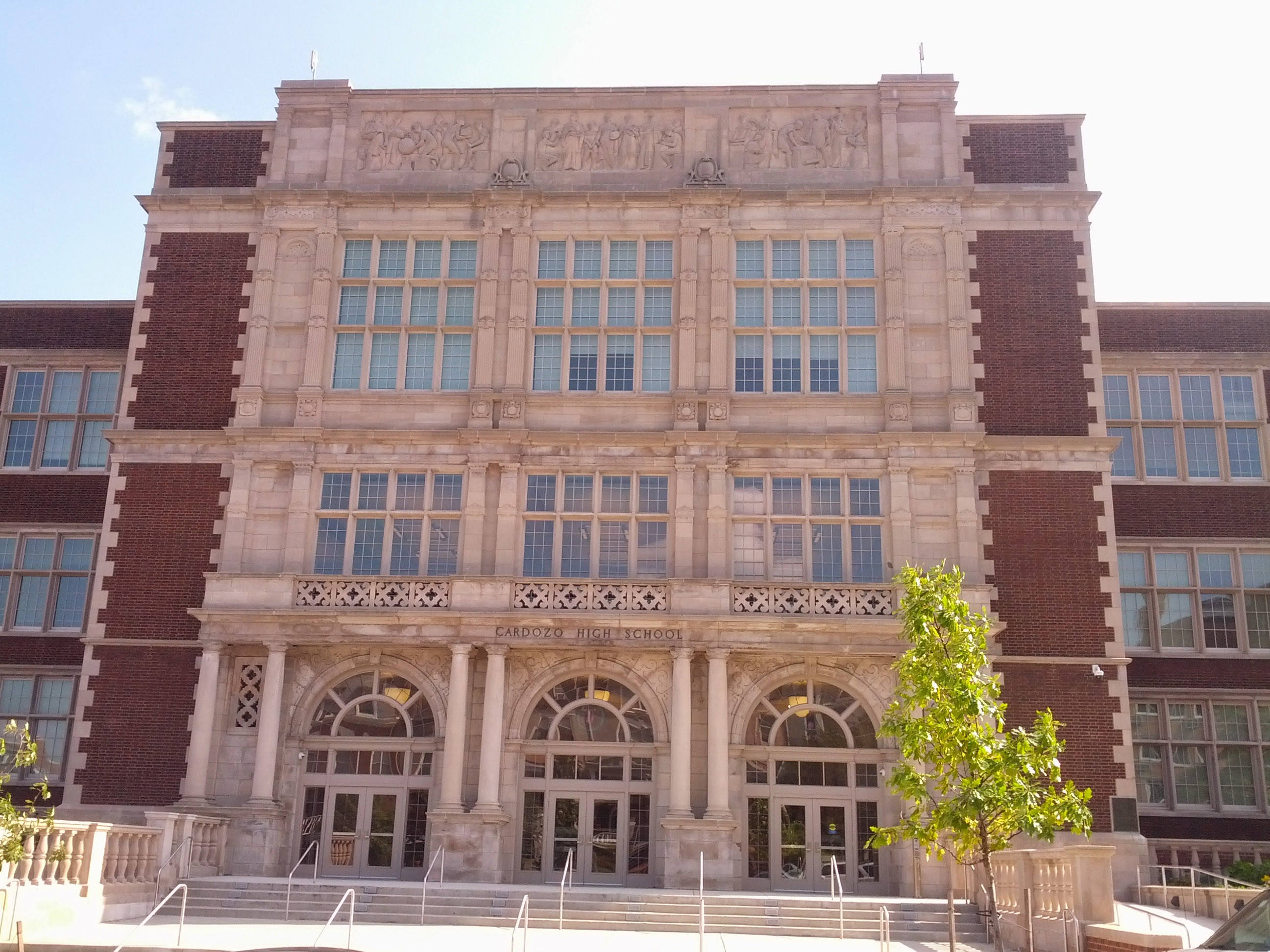
- The building is listed on the National Register of Historic Places

Location
- 1200 Clifton Street Northwest; Washington, DC 20009; United States; 38°55′19″N 77°01′42″W

Information
- School type: Public high school
- Established: 1928 (98 years ago)
- School district: District of Columbia Public Schools Ward 1
- CEEB code: 090075
- Principal: Arthur Mola
- Faculty: 83.0 (as of the 2019-2020 school year) (on FTE basis)
- Grades: 6 to 12
- Enrollment: 710 (as of SY2024-2025)
- Student to teacher ratio: 10.01
- Campus type: Urban
- Colors: Purple, white
- Mascot: Clerks
- Information: Metro Stop: U Street
- Website: www.cardozoec.org
- Cardozo Education Campus
- U.S. National Register of Historic Places
- D.C. Inventory of Historic Sites
- Location within the District of Columbia
- Built: 1917
- Architect: William B. Ittner
- Architectural style: Elizabethan Style
- MPS: Public School Buildings of Washington, DC MPS
- NRHP reference No.: 93001015

Significant dates
- Added to NRHP: September 30, 1993
- Designated DCIHS: June 19, 1991

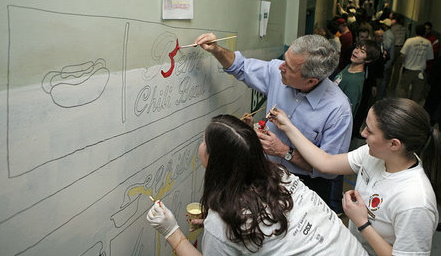
Then-U.S. President George W. Bush helping to paint a mural of local landmark Ben's Chili Bowl with City Year Americorps members at Cardozo.

Cardozo Education Campus, formerly Cardozo Senior High School and Central High School, is a combined middle and high school at 13th and Clifton Street in northwest Washington, D.C., United States, in the Columbia Heights neighborhood. Cardozo is operated by District of Columbia Public Schools. The school is named after clergyman, politician, and educator Francis Lewis Cardozo.

== Central High School ==
The Advanced Grammar School for Boys was established in 1877 and then combined with a similar school for girls in 1882 to form Washington High School, the first high school in the city. In 1890, the High School was split into three, with one high school opened in the current Peabody Elementary School building on Capitol Hill and another in Georgetown in the Curtis Building. As a result, the Washington High School became known as Central High School. In 1916, the school moved from Seventh and O to Thirteenth and Clifton.

The school's first building was a three-story brick structure; therein lied scientific libraries, a teacher's lounge, a library, an exhibition hall, a military exercise space, and more than a dozen classrooms. Female students outnumbered their male counterparts 2-1. In late 1908, a study hall was established specifically for third-year boys, in hopes that the boys would become more masculine.

== Marian Anderson controversy ==
In 1939, writing on behalf of the Board of Education of the District of Columbia now the District of Columbia State Board of Education, Superintendent Frank Ballou denied a request by contralto Marian Anderson to sing at the auditorium of the segregated white Central High School. As justification, he cited a federal law from 1906 requiring separate schools for the District. Meanwhile, the Daughters of the American Revolution had rejected a similar application.

When Eleanor Roosevelt resigned from that organization in protest, author Zora Neale Hurston criticized her for remaining silent about the fact that the Board had also excluded Anderson. "As far as the high-school auditorium is concerned," Hurston declared "to jump the people responsible for racial bias would be to accuse and expose the accusers themselves. The District of Columbia has no home rule; it is controlled by congressional committees, and Congress at the time was overwhelmingly Democratic. It was controlled by the very people who were screaming so loudly against the DAR. To my way of thinking, both places should have been denounced, or neither." Although Anderson later performed at an open-air concert at the Lincoln Memorial, the Board retained its policy of exclusion.

== Cardozo Senior High School ==
Known locally as "the castle on the hill", Cardozo's building was designed by architect William B. Ittner, a school building architect. The building was dedicated on February 15, 1917. Cardozo Senior High School was established in 1928. Originally located at Rhode Island Avenue and Ninth Street NW, it relocated to the Central High School building in 1950 and renamed. Cardozo was assigned for "colored" students in the segregated system and became one of three black high schools in DC.

The U Street Metro station is partially named after this school, with "Cardozo" in the station's subtitle. Likewise, an alternative, Urban Renewal-era name for the Columbia Heights neighborhood is Upper Cardozo, and some of the public buildings in the area still bear this name.

Until the 1954 opening of the all-black Luther Jackson High School in Fairfax County, Virginia, Cardozo and several other DCPS schools, along with a school in Manassas, Virginia, enrolled black secondary school students from the Fairfax County Public Schools as that district did not yet operate secondary schools for blacks.

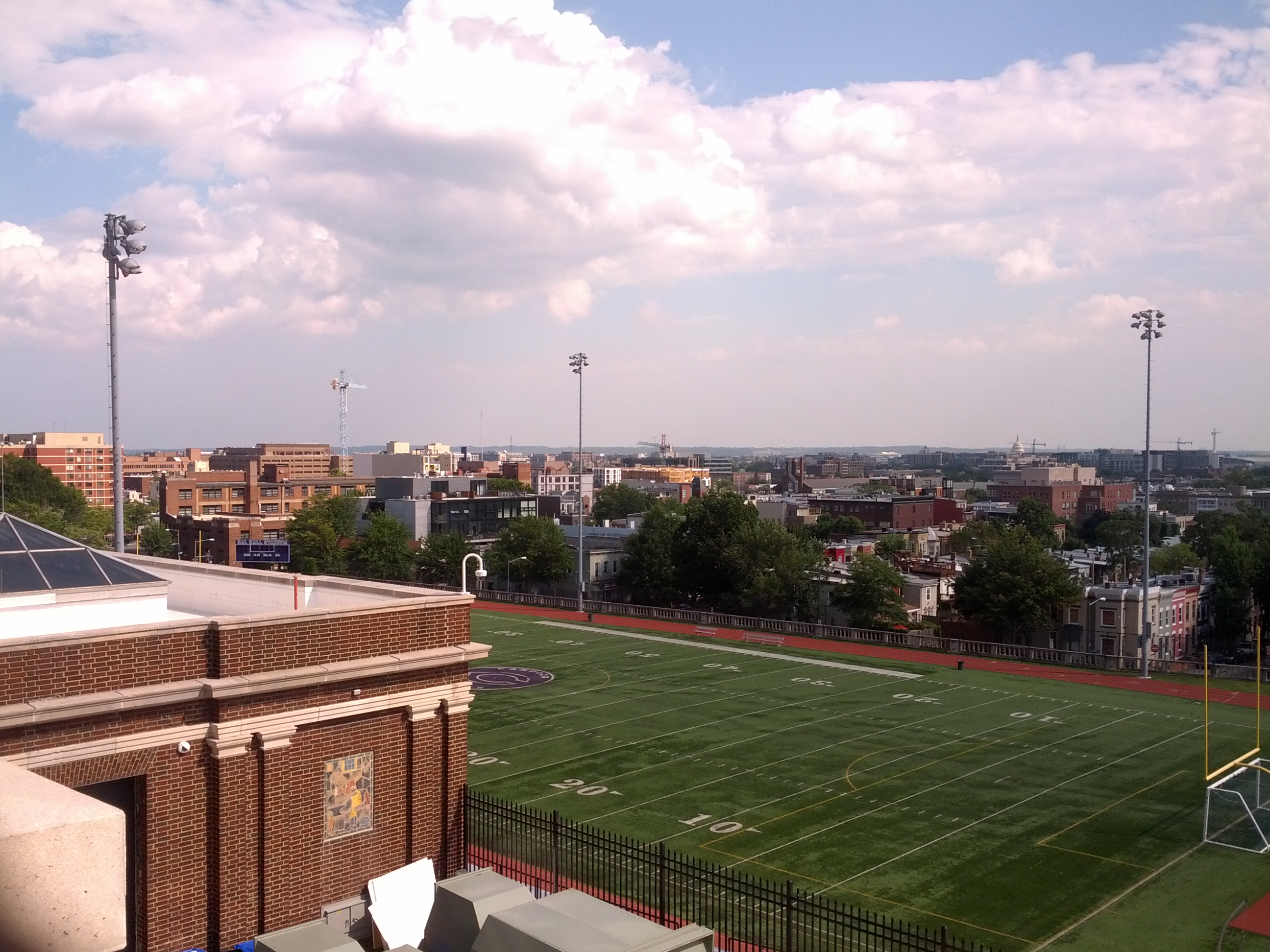
The view from Cardozo's parking deck: Florida Ave and Howard University to the southeast and U Street to the south.

== Renovation ==
In December 2011, work began to completely renovate Cardozo. In all, the renovation cost approximately $130 million and the school reopened for a new school year in August 2013. In addition to the physical changes to the building itself, the student body was increased with the addition of middle school students from the now-closed Shaw Middle School and the campus was renamed as Cardozo Education Campus.

== Shootings ==
Four different shootings happened on the school campus: the first on January 23, 1969 (1 dead, no injuries); the second on January 6, 1995 (1 dead, no injuries); the third on April 2, 2003 (1 injured, no deaths); and the fourth on September 22, 2006 (1 injured, no deaths).

== Notable alumni ==
Central High School

- Beatrice Aitchison, mathematician
- Caleb T. Bailey, United States Marine Corps brigadier general
- Sylvia Bernstein, civil rights activist
- Selma Munter Borchardt (1895– 1968), educator, lawyer, labor leader and lobbyist
- William G. Draper, US Air Force pilot
- George Dantzig, mathematician
- Pat Foote, U.S. Army brigadier general
- Charles D. Griffin, Navy admiral
- Herbert Haft, founder of Dart Drug and Crown Books discount chains
- J. Edgar Hoover, FBI director
- Miles Imlay, U.S. Coast Guard rear admiral
- Yvonne Levy Kushner, actress
- Robert B. Luckey, Marine Corps general
- Bruce Magruder (1903), U.S. Army major general
- John S. McCain Jr., Navy admiral
- John F. O'Leary, U.S. government official
- Lansdale Sasscer, U.S. Congressman
- John F. Shafroth Jr., U.S. Navy vice admiral
- Alfred Sao-ke Sze, Chinese politician and diplomat
- Oliver Lyman Spaulding (1891), U.S. Army brigadier general
- Donald A. Stroh, U.S. Army major general
- Robert Trout, American radio and television journalist
- Karl Truesdell, U.S. Army major general
- Arthur Cutts Willard, engineer and university president
- Eben Eveleth Winslow, U.S. Army brigadier general
- Ben Steiner, American Major League Baseball Player

Cardozo Senior High

- H. R. Crawford (1957), politician
- Marvin Gaye, musician
- Anwan Glover, musician
- Petey Green, radio host
- Edward P. Jones, author
- Moochie Norris, basketball player
- James E. Mayo, museum director
- Conrad Tillard (born 1964), politician, Baptist minister, radio host, author, and activist
- Maury Wills, baseball player

== Notable faculty ==
- Marie Taylor (1911–1990), former biology teacher, first woman to earn a science doctorate at Fordham University, and former chair of the Botany Department at Howard University

== Feeder patterns ==
The following elementary schools feed into Cardozo:

- Marie Reed Elementary School
- Cleveland Elementary School
- Garrison Elementary School
- Raymond Education Campus
- School Without Walls @ Francis-Stevens
- Seaton Elementary School
- Ross Elementary School

The following middle schools feed into Cardozo:

- Raymond Education Campus
- School Without Walls at Francis-Stevens
