= Danny Burmeister =

American football player (born 1963)

No. 22
- Position: Safety

Personal information
- Born: September 13, 1963 (age 63); Fayetteville, North Carolina, U.S.
- Listed height: 6 ft 2 in (1.88 m)
- Listed weight: 201 lb (91 kg)

Career information
- High school: Oakton
- College: North Carolina
- NFL draft: 1987: undrafted

Career history
- Washington Redskins (1987); Pittsburgh Gladiators (1988); Washington Commandos (1990)

Awards and highlights
- Brian Piccolo Award (1985)
- Stats at Pro Football Reference

Daniel Joseph Burmeister (born September 13, 1963) is an American former professional football player who was a safety for one season with the Washington Redskins of the National Football League (NFL) in 1987.

He played college football for the North Carolina Tar Heels. In 1982, he was named a Parade High School Football All-American while playing for Oakton High School in Fairfax County, Virginia.
