= Death of Dave Sharrett II =

2008 U.S. Army friendly fire incident

| Date | 16 January 2008 |
| Location | Balad, Iraq |
| Result | Two U.S. soldiers killed by insurgent fire, one killed by friendly forces |

On 16 January 2008, United States Army Private First Class Dave Sharrett II was killed during a battle with insurgents near Balad, Iraq during the Iraq War. Subsequent investigation determined Sharrett was shot a single time by his commanding officer, then-Lieutenant Timothy Hanson.

== David H. Sharrett II ==
David H. Sharrett II was born in Woodstock, Virginia in June 1980, to David Sharrett Sr., a local schoolteacher, and Kimberly Drummond. David Sharrett II's parents divorced early in his life, and he grew up around Oakton, Virginia, where he attended Oakton Elementary School, then Cooper Intermediate School and Oakton High School. In high school, he played defensive end on the school's football team before graduating high school in 1999. After graduation, Sharrett considered college but instead opted to work several odd jobs, telling his family he was not ready to continue his education. He worked as a bartender and a doorman in several local restaurants and bars until around 2005. During this time, he met Heather Shell, whom he would later marry. He also attended some classes at Northern Virginia Community College, where he studied history and literature.

Sharrett had considered joining the US military several times, twice beginning the process and backing out. However, Sharrett eventually enlisted in September 2006, hoping to serve a three-year Army tour and then return home to complete a degree and become a history teacher. He married Shell in January 2007, after returning from basic combat training, and the couple moved to Fort Campbell, Kentucky where Sharrett was assigned to the 1st Squadron, 32nd Cavalry Regiment, 1st Brigade Combat Team, 101st Airborne Division. His awards included the National Defense Service Medal, Global War on Terrorism Service Medal, Army Service Ribbon, and an Expert Marksman Badge with the M4 Carbine. He had volunteered for air assault school and airborne school as well.

Sharret's unit was deployed to northern Iraq in September 2007 in support of Operation Iraqi Freedom. Initially the unit was based near the border with Iran to interdict weapons smuggling across the border. Later it was based at Forward Operating Base Paliwoda near Balad. Sharrett and his father stayed in regular contact throughout the deployment. In the days leading up to his death, Sharrett had indicated displeasure with the post, reportedly telling his father during a conversation, "We're doing too much stupid stuff. I want out of the infantry."

== Incident ==
On 16 January 2008, Sharrett was part of an 8-man patrol participating in Operation Hood Harvest near the village of Bichigan, north of Baghdad. The allied coalition had discovered that the insurgent group al-Qaeda in Iraq was using the region to equip suicide bombers. Sharrett's seven-man squad, led by Staff Sergeant Chris McGraw, was joined by First Lieutenant Timothy Hanson, the company executive officer, who was to direct communications with the squad's air support. Designated "Team 6," this team was to patrol in two UH-60 Black Hawk helicopters for any insurgents active past the local curfew.

Shortly before 05:00 local time, overhead observers spotted six men running single file through a palm grove outside of town. The six men, apparently unarmed, sprinted across a field before taking cover in an oval-shaped thicket of branches and vines, as observed by nearby helicopters and Unmanned Aerial Vehicles. At 05:07, Team 6 disembarked from its helicopters, equipped with night vision devices, as there was no ambient light and conditions were reportedly pitch black. They were also equipped with infrared flashing lights visible only though night vision, which serve as Identification friend or foe {IFF} tags. However, neither McGraw nor Hanson ordered the team to turn on the IFF tags, and five of the eight did not do so. In the meantime, the six insurgents apparently armed themselves with AK-47s and grenades which had been concealed in a cache in the thicket, lying down and keeping still. At 05:15, Team 6 approached the brush and surrounded it, with four men on each side, and called into the brush for the insurgents to come out.

One minute later, an insurgent shouted "Allahu Akbar!" from inside the brush before the concealed insurgents opened fire on the surrounding Team 6. Both McGraw and Specialist Raphael Collins, positioned next to Sharrett, were immediately wounded in their shoulders. On the west side of the brush, Corporal John Sigsbee was shot and mortally wounded, while Private First Class Danny Kimme was shot in the head and killed as he attempted to assume a prone position. By then, Hanson radioed the helicopter that they were under attack as Sharrett sprinted to the west side of the thicket, taking a position next to Sigsbee, remaining quiet and motionless approximately 4 feet (1.2 m) from the brush as the insurgents continued to fire their weapons from it. At 05:20, Sharrett stood up and ran away from the brush toward Hanson's position, firing over his shoulder and apparently striking an insurgent. At this point, he and Hanson were obscured from the sight of overhead helicopters by trees, but when they reemerged five seconds later Sharrett was seen writhing on the ground and Hanson was running away from the position.

At 06:03, Team 4, another US force of snipers and infantry arrived, encountering Team 6 survivors. Hanson stated he did not know where Sharrett, Sigsbee, or Kimme were. Team 4 then lined up for a methodical assault on the brush, discovering Sigsbee and Kimme's corpses in the process. One minute later, a UH-60 landed north of the thicket, and the wounded McGraw and Collins climbed onboard along with the unscathed Hanson. The helicopter then flew to a combat support hospital in Balad, where McGraw and Collins disembarked. Hanson returned in the helicopter back to Forward Operating Base Paliwoda where he returned to his quarters without briefing commanders.

In the meantime, Team 4 called in close air support and overhead Black Hawk helicopters attacked the brush with machine guns until at 06:10 it was discovered that the six insurgents were dead. The team unsuccessfully searched for Sharrett. At 06:35, the team fired a flare aloft and discovered Sharrett in the brush, with a faint pulse. The team members attempted CPR and called in a Medevac. Sharrett was evacuated to FOB Paliwoda at 06:50 and pronounced dead an hour later.

== Aftermath ==
Sharrett was the 3,595th servicemember of the United States to be killed in the Iraq War. Sharrett was buried in Section 60 of Arlington National Cemetery in Arlington, Virginia. On 23 April 2008, the United States House of Representatives passed a resolution naming the post office in Oakton the "Private First Class David H. Sharrett II Post Office Building." Congressman Tom Davis of Virginia introduced the measure. In an unusual move, US President Barack Obama visited Sharrett's grave site on Veterans Day 2009 during a tour of the cemetery, meeting Sharrett family friend and investigative journalist James Gordon Meek on this visit.

In July 2012, then-Captain Timothy Hanson was dismissed from the U.S. Army, and his combat badge revoked, over this case.

=== Initial reports ===
On 19 January 2008, the survivors in Team 6 were ordered to write reports detailing the incident. In his statement, Hanson said he hit the ground as the shooting started and fired six to 10 shots at the thicket, and then stated he saw Sharrett and Sigsbee "lying face down no more than 10 feet from the enemy position." Hanson stated he heard one of the soldiers state they were hit, but was unable to reach them because of insurgent fire, and so he broke contact and moved away. Hanson did not mention firing his weapon after the initial attack, and provided detailed accounts of the locations of the squad, contradicting statements the Team 4 troops made indicating Hanson had been unable to provide their location. In a second report on 25 January, Hanson gave more detail on the incident but did not mention shooting anyone. In subsequent reports, Hanson repeatedly denied shooting or identifying anyone.

In the meantime, the US military reported on 18 January that Sharrett, Sigsbee and Kimme were killed in a grenade attack, withholding specifics of the incident.
