= James Gordon Meek =

American former journalist

- Born: August 24, 1969
- Occupation: Journalist
- Citizenship: American
- Spouse: Divorced
- Children: two daughters

James Gordon Meek (born August 24, 1969) is an American former ABC News senior producer and senior counter-terrorism advisor to the U.S. House Committee on Homeland Security. During his time as a journalist, Meek held prominent positions covering the justice system, military, and foreign intelligence desks.

In 2022, his home was raided by the FBI, in what was later revealed to be an investigation into child pornography. In 2023, Meek was arrested on charges of transportation and possession of child pornography. Later that year, he pleaded guilty to those charges and was sentenced to six years in prison.

== Career ==
His father, John Martin Meek, had been a lobbyist and speechwriter for John F. Kennedy, Lyndon Johnson and Bobby Kennedy.

Meek initially wrote political articles for the CD-ROM magazine Blender, leading to 1995 accreditation with the Periodical Press Galleries. Meek and his partner Mike Rosenberg formed the "irreverent" Gridlock webzine to apply for accreditation to the Senate Periodical Press Gallery but were denied as the webzine could not be the pair's primary source of income. In August 1996, both men were "shown the door" by Blender for a "poor attitude". Meek was the last person to interview William Colby, for a story on the assassination of John F. Kennedy, as the former CIA director was found dead days later.

Meek and Rosenberg then founded "Digital Culture Interactive News", which wrote stories about their Gridlock webzine, and sent submissions to Reader's Digest. Meek was thanked in the EPA director's 2000 book on the subject of Public relations.

Meek wrote extensively on the death of Dave Sharrett II, whose father had taught Meek at Langley High School. Meek wrote of his "deep friendship" with the family of Caitlan Coleman, and is a personal friend of constitutional lawyer Mark Zaid.

From 2005 to 2006, Meek helped Peter Bergen and Bergen's wife, Tresha Mabile, release the best-selling book The Osama bin Laden I Know. Legal author Stuart Taylor Jr. accused Meek of "classist" coverage falsely suggesting guilt of the wrongly-accused defendants in the 2006 Duke lacrosse case.

In 2011, Meek was hired as a senior counter-terrorism investigator for the House Committee on Homeland Security, although he was unsure why Congressman Peter King had spontaneously offered him the position as he had not sought any such employment—though Meek noted he'd written widely on terrorism and his third cousin's wife had been killed in the 1995 Oklahoma City bombing.

In 2013, Meek was hired as a senior investigative producer for ABC News' 20/20, Good Morning America, ABC World News Tonight and Nightline programming from 2013 to 2022. In 2017 Meek wrote an article about Russian disinformation in the Syrian war wherein he referred to "the debunked Pizzagate conspiracy theory", which drew viral attention with exaggerated suggestions Meek had said much more, after his guilty plea to judge Claude Hilton.

Meek appeared as a panelist, together with Ewen and Coleman, at the 2021 Double Exposure Film Festival. According to Fox News, although he never served in the military, he chose to dress in "typical military-style getup" .

== Child pornography prosecution ==
In 2021, Meek was investigated by the Federal Bureau of Investigation for crimes related to child pornography. He was charged with transporting child pornography in February of the following year. In July 2023, he pleaded guilty to one count of distribution and another of possessing child pornography. He was sentenced to six years in prison in September.
