= William G. Draper =

US Air Force pilot (1920-1964)

William Grafton Draper Lieutenant colonel
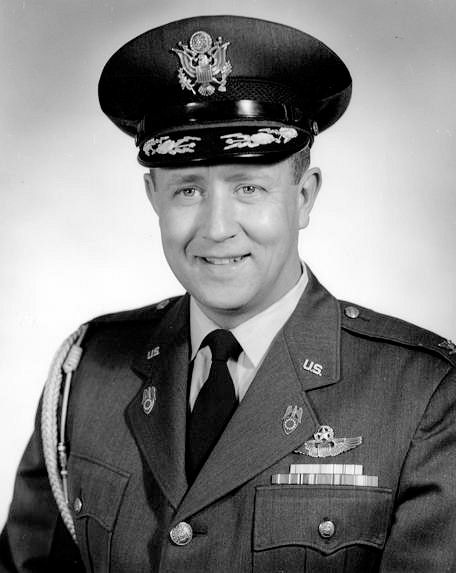
- Draper in full military outfit
- Born: June 28, 1920; Cuyahoga Falls, Ohio, United States
- Died: November 26, 1964 (aged 44); Camp Springs, Prince George's, Maryland, United States
- Burial place: Arlington National Cemetery
- Education: University of Maryland
- Spouse: Ruth Draper
- Children: 4
- Military career
- Allegiance: United States
- Branch: Air Force
- Service years: 1942-1964
- Rank: Colonel
- Known for: Command Pilot for Dwight D. Eisenhower

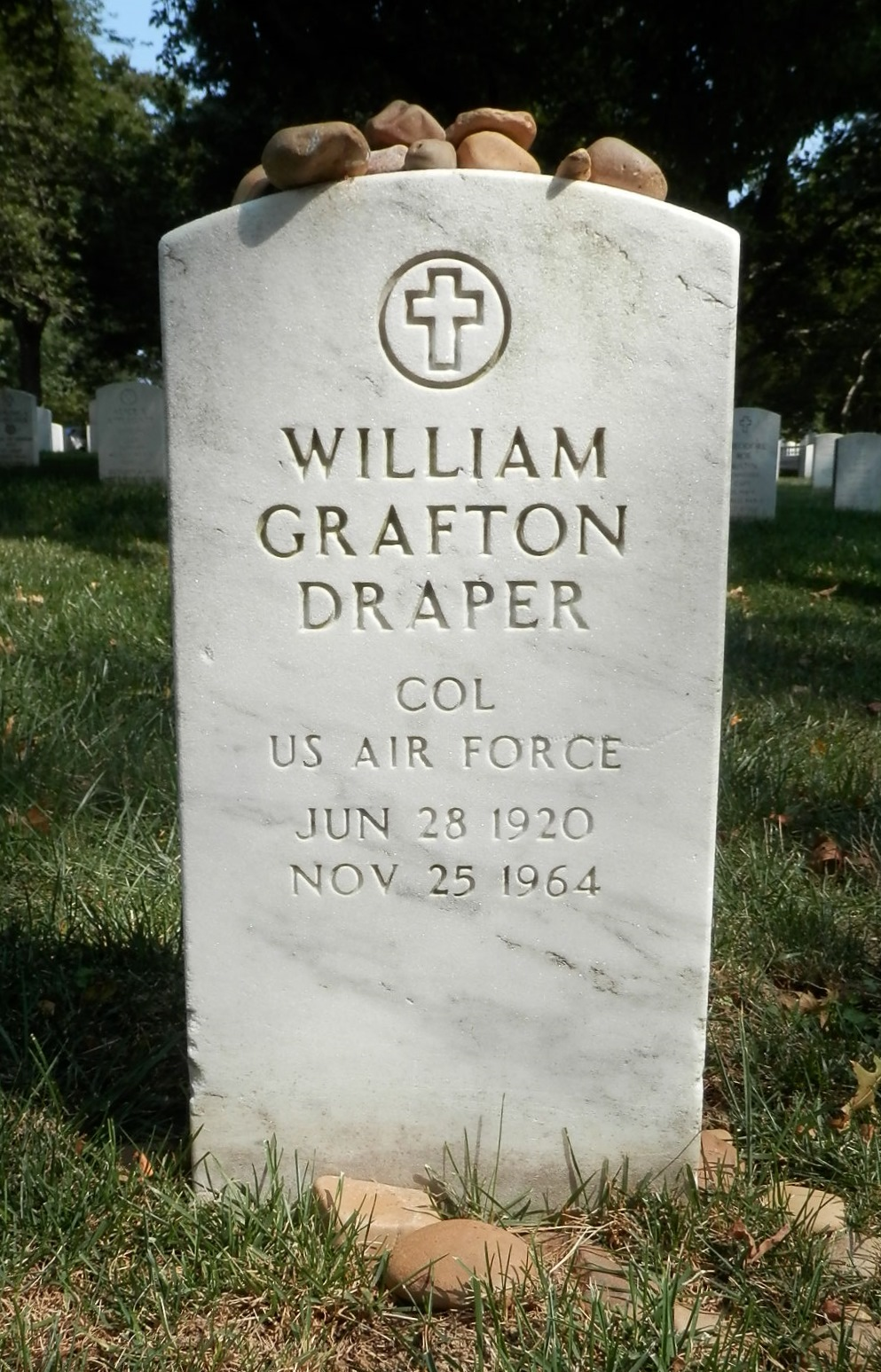
Colonel William Grafton Draper's grave at Arlington National Cemetery (2013)

William G. Draper (June 28, 1920 – November 26, 1964) was a career military officer and personal pilot to President Dwight D. Eisenhower during his presidency.

== Early life ==
He was born in Cuyahoga Falls, Ohio. He graduated from Central High School in Washington, D.C. in 1939.

== Military service ==
He obtained his CAA private and commercial licenses in 1940, and in 1941 received his instructor's rating at the Wilmington, Delaware airport. In November 1942 he joined the United States Army Air Forces and was commissioned a 2nd Lieutenant. He was assigned to Air Transport Command North Atlantic Wing ferrying B-17 Flying Fortress bombers to England and North Africa. He later was assigned to the Air Transport Command India-China Division "Fireball Line," which flew supplies and equipment in the China-Burma-India Theater from Miami to Assam, India. After the war William became a pilot for the Special Air Mission Squadron at National Airport in Washington.

== Working with Eisenhower ==
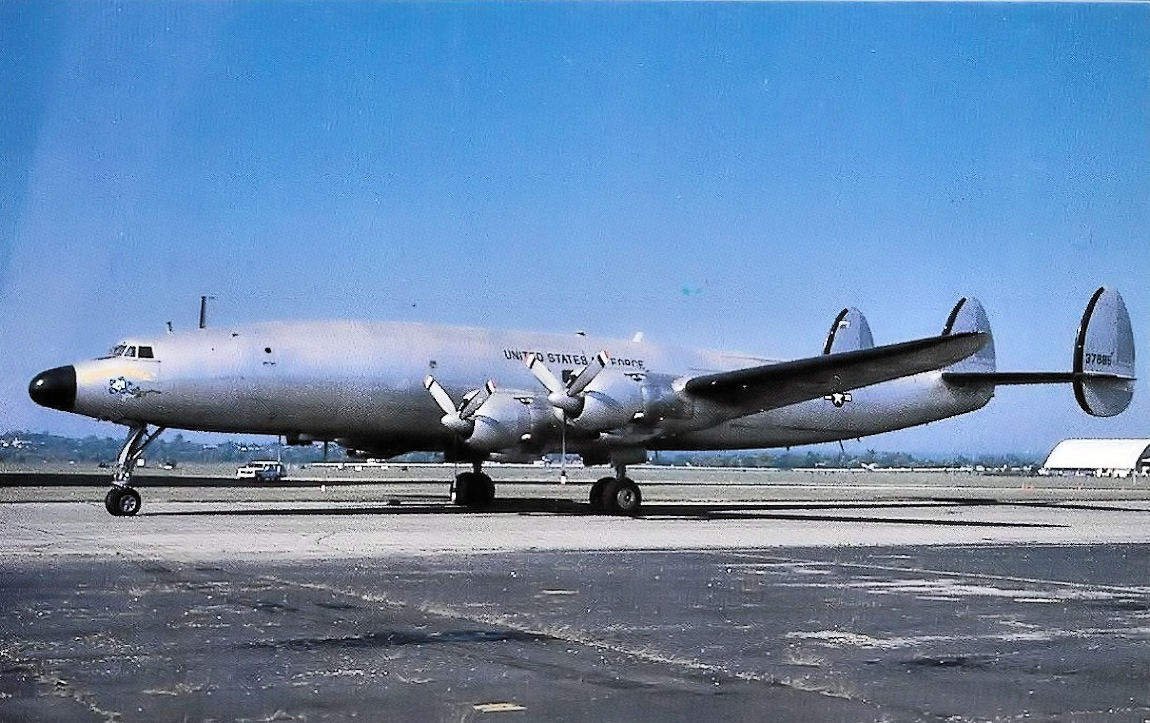
"Columbine III", VC-121E Super Constellation 53-7885 flown by Colonel Draper while pilot for President Eisenhower (1960)

Colonel Draper was the pilot of Eisenhower's presidential plane "Columbine II," the predecessor of the special presidential plane that is now called "Air Force One." Columbine II, bearing the aircraft registration N8610, would always use the call sign "Air Force 8610", regardless of the passengers on the flight. After a 1953 incident in which a commercial flight, Eastern Air Lines 8610, crossed paths with Air Force 8610, which was carrying President Eisenhower over Richmond, Virginia, it was Draper who suggested the standardized designation for the presidential plane to avoid any further such incidents.

He appeared on an episode of What's My Line on May 22, 1955.

== Death ==
After being assigned to the Alaska Command when Eisenhower left the White House in January 1961, Draper suffered a heart attack in 1963 which ended his service as a pilot, which he had been continuously since he was 19. On November 26, 1964, he committed suicide by hanging himself, reportedly depressed. Draper was interred at Arlington National Cemetery, Virginia.
