= Joe Rizzo (baseball) =

American baseball player (born 1998)

- Third baseman
- Born: March 31, 1998 (age 28); Hackensack, New Jersey, U.S.
- Bats: Left Throws: Right

Joseph Rizzo (born March 31, 1998) is an American former professional baseball third baseman.

== Early life ==
Rizzo was born on March 31, 1998, in Hackensack, New Jersey. He attended Oakton High School in Vienna, Virginia, where he played baseball.

== Amateur career ==
Prior to his junior year, he committed to play college baseball at the University of South Carolina. As a junior in 2015, Rizzo batted .606 with seven home runs and was named the Virginia 6A Player of the Year. In 2016, his senior year, he hit .392 with four home runs.

Following his senior year, he was selected by the Seattle Mariners in the second round of the 2016 Major League Baseball draft. He signed for $1.75 million.

== Professional career ==
=== Seattle Mariners ===
After signing with the Mariners, Rizzo made his professional debut with the Rookie-level Arizona League Mariners, batting .291 with two home runs and 21 RBIs over 39 games. In 2017, Rizzo spent a majority of the season with the Clinton LumberKings of the Single–A Midwest League before earning a promotion to the Modesto Nuts of the High–A California League at the end of the season. Over 115 games, he slashed .251/.349/.344 with seven home runs and 51 RBIs. He returned to Modesto in 2018, earning All-Star honors while hitting .241 with four home runs and 55 RBIs over 123 games. Rizzo returned for Modesto for the third straight year in 2019, once again earning All-Star honors while slashing .295/.354/.423 with ten home runs and 63 RBIs over 129 games, earning the Alvin Davis “Mr. Mariner” Award.

Rizzo did not play a minor league game in 2020 due to the cancellation of the minor league season caused by the COVID-19 pandemic. Rizzo was assigned to the Arkansas Travelers of the Double-A Central for the 2021 season, slashing .253/.330/.400 with 12 home runs and sixty RBIs over 105 games. He returned to Arkansas for the 2022 season. Over 118 games, he hit .277 with 21 home runs, 69 RBIs, and thirty doubles. Rizzo elected free agency following the season on November 10, 2022.

=== Miami Marlins ===
On January 5, 2023, Rizzo signed a minor league deal with the Miami Marlins. In 43 games split between the Double–A Pensacola Blue Wahoos and Triple–A Jacksonville Jumbo Shrimp, he hit .203/.276/.313 with 3 home runs and 22 RBI.

=== Detroit Tigers ===
On June 8, 2023, Rizzo was traded to the Detroit Tigers. In 38 games for the Triple–A Toledo Mud Hens, he batted .299/.358/.518 with 6 home runs and 28 RBI. On August 15, Rizzo was released by the Tigers organization.
