= Manassas Regional High School =

Location
- 9601 Wellington Road, Manassas, VA 20110
- Coordinates: 38.746792°N 77.487838°W -->

Information
- Other name: Jennie Dean High School (1960-66)
- Former name: Manassas Industrial School for Colored Youth (1894-1938)
- Type: Public, segregated
- Established: 1938
- Closed: 1966
- Campus size: 100 acres (40 ha)
- Nickname: Jennie Dean
- Last updated: 28 December 2017

Manassas Regional High School was a segregated public school for black students that existed from 1938 until 1966 in Manassas, Virginia. It served black students from Prince William, Warren, Fauquier, and Fairfax counties.

The school was the successor to Manassas Industrial School for Colored Youth, a private vocational school for black students founded in 1894.

The buildings were demolished in the late 1960s and 1970s, and Jennie Dean Elementary School was built on part of the site. Five acres of the current campus are a park and archeological site devoted to Manassas Industrial School and Jennie Dean.
