= Scott Turner (American football coach) =

American football coach (born 1982)

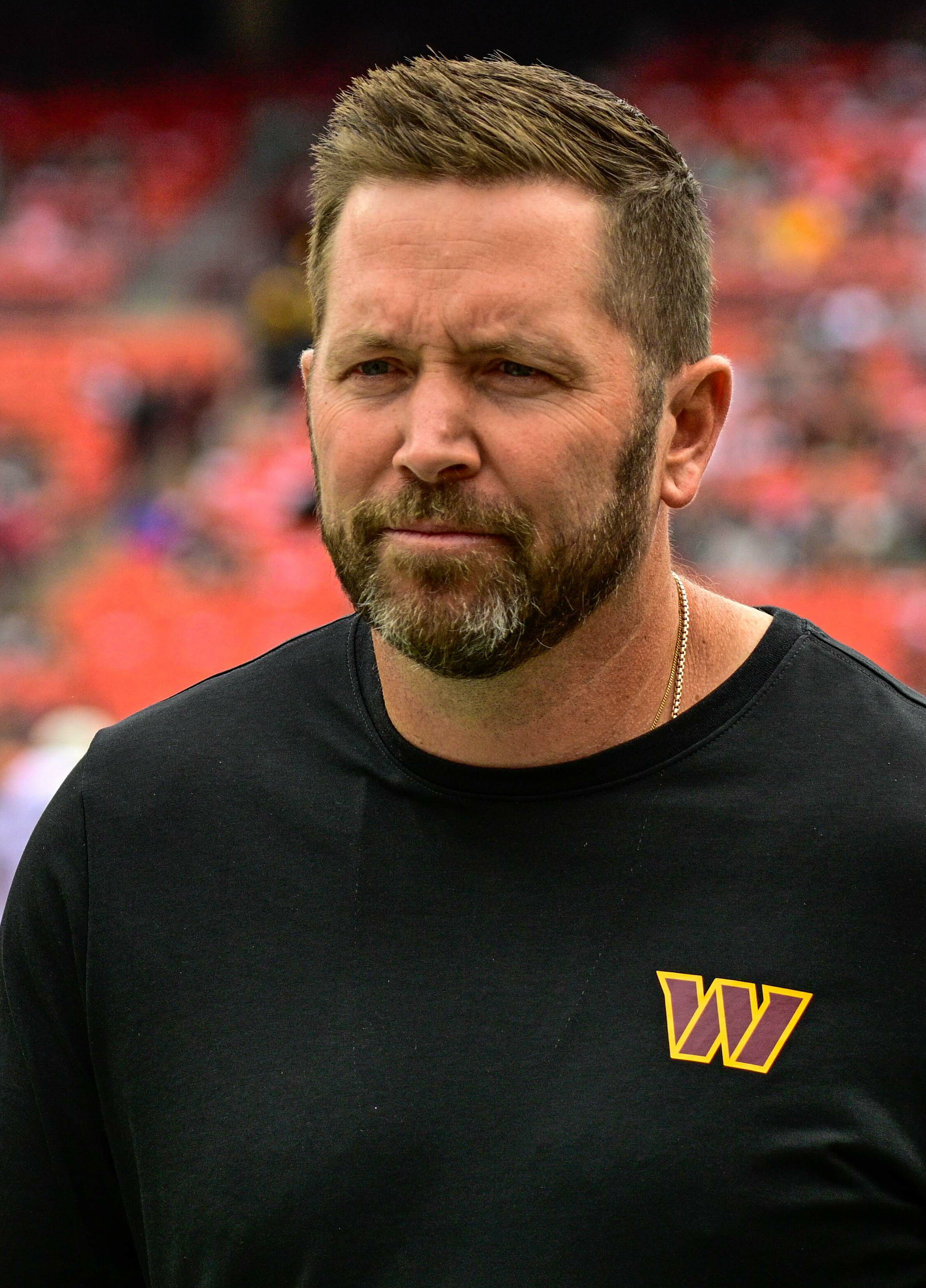
- Turner with the Washington Commanders in 2022

Personal information
- Born: August 7, 1982 (age 44); Los Angeles, California, U.S.

Career information
- Position: Quarterback
- High school: Oakton (Oakton, Virginia)
- College: UNLV (2001–2004)

Career history
- Oregon State (2005) Graduate assistant; South County High School (2006–2007) Offensive coordinator; Pittsburgh (2008–2009) Offensive assistant; Pittsburgh (2010) Wide receivers coach; Carolina Panthers (2011–2012) Offensive quality control coach; Cleveland Browns (2013) Wide receivers coach; Minnesota Vikings (2014–2016) Quarterbacks coach; Michigan (2017) Offensive analyst; Carolina Panthers (2018–2019) Quarterbacks coach; Washington Football Team / Commanders (2020–2022) Offensive coordinator; Las Vegas Raiders (2023–2024) Pass game coordinator; Las Vegas Raiders (2024) Interim offensive coordinator; New York Jets (2025) Passing game coordinator
- Coaching profile at Pro Football Reference

Scott Michael Turner (born August 7, 1982) is an American football coach who was most recently the offensive passing game coordinator for the New York Jets of the National Football League (NFL). He has also been an assistant coach for the Minnesota Vikings, Cleveland Browns, Carolina Panthers, as well as an offensive coordinator for the Washington Football Team / Commanders and the Las Vegas Raiders. He is the son of former NFL head coach Norv Turner.

== Early life ==
Turner was born on August 7, 1982, in Los Angeles. He spent some of his childhood in Coppell, Texas, while his father, Norv, was offensive coordinator of the Dallas Cowboys teams that won two Super Bowls. In 1993, after his father was hired as head coach of the Washington Redskins, he and his family moved to Northern Virginia. Turner attended Oakton High School in Vienna, Virginia, where he played quarterback for their football team.

Turner attended the University of Nevada, Las Vegas. He was a backup quarterback for the Rebels from 2001-2004, where he became close friends with teammate Shane Steichen. The pair would later work together on the 2013 Cleveland Browns offensive coaching staff, where Norv Turner was the offensive coordinator.

Turner played minimally in college, attempting 14 career passes. He graduated from UNLV with a bachelors degree in psychology in 2005.

== Coaching career ==
=== Carolina Panthers ===
In 2011, Turner started his NFL coaching career with the Carolina Panthers under first-year head coach Ron Rivera. Turner served as the offensive quality control coach for two seasons with the Panthers.

=== Cleveland Browns ===
In 2013, Turner was hired by the Cleveland Browns as their wide receivers coach. This would mark the first time that he coached with his father, who was the Browns offensive coordinator.

=== Minnesota Vikings ===
In 2014, Turner was hired by the Minnesota Vikings as their quarterback coach under his offensive coordinator father, Norv, and first-year head coach Mike Zimmer. He worked closely with Teddy Bridgewater, drafted 32nd overall in the first round of the 2014 NFL draft. In 2015, the Vikings won the NFC North division title but lost to the Seattle Seahawks in the wild card. He was fired in January 2017.

=== Michigan Wolverines ===
Turner was hired as an offensive analyst under Michigan Wolverines head coach Jim Harbaugh in February 2017.

=== Return to Carolina ===
In 2018, Turner returned to the Panthers as their quarterback coach. He was their interim offensive coordinator for the final four games of the 2019 season following head coach Ron Rivera's firing.

=== Washington Football Team / Commanders ===
On January 8, 2020, Turner was hired by the Washington Football Team as their offensive coordinator under head coach Ron Rivera. He signed a multi-year contract extension on March 13, 2022, but was dismissed by the team following the season.

=== Las Vegas Raiders ===
Turner joined the Las Vegas Raiders as their pass game coordinator on February 3, 2023. He was named the team's interim offensive coordinator on November 5, 2024, following the firing of Luke Getsy.

=== New York Jets ===
On February 2, 2025, the New York Jets hired Turner as their passing game coordinator. On January 23, 2026, Turner was fired by the Jets.
