= Luther Porter Jackson =

American historian (1892–1950)

Luther Jackson
- Born: July 11, 1892; Lexington, Kentucky, U.S.
- Died: January 20, 1950 (aged 57); Petersburg, Virginia, U.S.
- Education: Fisk University (BA); Columbia University Teachers' College (MA); University of Chicago (PhD))
- Occupations: Scholar, historian, author, professor
- Spouse: Johnnella Frazer

Luther Porter Jackson (July 11, 1892 – April 20, 1950) was an American historian, educator, author, and civil rights leader who advocated for voting rights in the United States. Through publishing and activism, Jackson mobilized the African American population of Virginia and elsewhere to push for civil rights and voting rights from the 1920s until his death in 1950.

== Early life and education ==
Jackson was born July 11, 1892, in Lexington, Kentucky. He was the ninth of 12 children born to Edward and Delilah Jackson, both enslaved until freed by the American Civil War, and believed strongly in racial self help as advocated by Booker T. Washington. Luther Jackson graduated from Chandler Normal School in Lexington. in 1910. He attended Fisk University in Nashville, Tennessee, where he was in the first class to study African-American history, and received his bachelor's degree in 1914. He also studied at the University of Kansas and City Colleges of New York, and received his master's degree in education from Columbia University Teachers' College in 1922. Later, under the guidance of Avery O. Craven at University of Chicago, Jackson earned a doctorate in history in 1937.

== Career ==
In 1915, Jackson began his teaching career in Denmark, South Carolina, where he taught at Voorhees Industrial School until 1918, then accepted a position at the Topeka Industrial Institute in Kansas. After two years he decided to seek further education in New York City. In 1922, a year after graduating from Columbia University in New York, Jackson married fellow Kentuckian and Fisk alum who was teaching music at the Virginia Normal and Industrial Institute (founded in 1882 as the Virginia's only institution of higher education for African Americans, but which had its collegiate function cut back in 1902 and restored in 1920, and which become "Virginia State College" in 1946 and is now Virginia State University). Jackson accepted a position leading the institute's high school (one of the few high schools for African Americans in Virginia). In 1928, as he began his part-time studies at the University of Chicago for a PhD degree, Jackson became a professor of history at the college, and would serve two decades as chairperson of its social sciences department, until his death.

Jackson published his doctoral dissertation, Free Negro Labor and Property Holdings in Virginia, 1830-1860 in 1942, and would publish more than sixty books, articles, pamphlets, and newspaper articles. In 1945, Jackson published Negro Office Holders in Virginia, 1865–1895, with the earlier work establishing hims as expert on Virginia history. Both books also showed African Americans as productive citizens, and supported Jackson's political advocacy described below, that ending racial oppression would allow blacks to contribute more fully to American society. Jackson also re-published his 1937 history of Gillfield Baptist Church in 1941, and an Annual Report on the Voting Status of the Negroes in Virginia from 1945 to 1950. Together with his friend and mentor Carter Woodson, Jackson was active in the Association for the Study of Negro Life and History (established 1925) and would publish numerous articles in articles in the Journal of Negro Education and the Journal of Negro History. The Association promoted "Negro History Week", a predecessor of Black History Month. Jackson also wrote a weekly newspaper column between 1942 and 1948 for the Norfolk Journal and Guide entitled "Rights and Duties in a Democracy".

=== Social activism ===
As a professor and teachers' union activist, Jackson worked to stimulate political awakening among black Virginians. Encouraged by Nixon v. Herndon (1927), in which the United States Supreme Court declared all-white primaries illegal, Jackson in 1935 became one of the founders of the Petersburg League of Negro Voters, a predecessor of the statewide Virginia Voters League. During the 1940s, the National Association for the Advancement of Colored People (NAACP) would distribute his annual voting report widely, sending between 10,000 and 12,000 copies to daily newspapers, libraries, teachers, reform organizations, as well as state and federal officials. Jackson claimed that in 1944 95% of Virginia's more than 4,000 black teachers received a copy of the report. He also wrote a monthly column for the Norfolk Journal and Guide that documented African American contributions to American life and sometimes urged collective action.

Jackson also fought Virginia's Jim Crow laws by coordinating with members of his church, as well as with the Petersburg Negro Business Association, the Virginia Teachers Association (VTA), the Southern School for Workers, the Southern Conference Education Fund, the Southern Regional Council, and the notably progressive Southern Conference for Human Welfare. The Petersburg Negro Business Association which he helped found in 1937 expanded into the Virginia Trade Association. He also worked with attorneys Thurgood Marshall and Oliver Hill to equalize salaries of black and white teachers, which in 1940 succeeded before the U.S. Circuit Court of Appeals for the 4th Circuit in Alston v. Board of Education of the City of Norfolk. Jackson also joined with the Virginia Civil Rights Organization to challenge public transit segregation in Richmond.

However, his activism was not without pushback, both from white supremacists and from more radical African Americans. In October 1942, at the suggestion of Jessie Daniel Ames. Jackson, Rev. Gordon Blaine Hancock of Virginia Union University in Richmond and North Carolina native P. B. Young of the Norfolk Journal and Guide convened many moderate African American leaders in Durham, North Carolina. Fifty signed the resulting document, which became known as the "Durham Manifesto," which called for improvement within the existing system, as well as condemned the practice of racial segregation. However, many white moderates thought opposing all Jim Crow laws went too far and also regretted not having been invited to the Durham conference, so the two groups met in Richmond in 1943 and in 1944 formed the Southern Regional Council. In November 1948, Jackson organized a conference at Thomas Jefferson's historic Monticello Plantation that produced a document signed by 50 leading activists calling for "freedom from any discrimination bounded by law."

== Personal life ==
In 1922, Jackson married Johnnella Frazer, a fellow Fisk graduate. and initially a piano teacher at the institute, and later the organist for Gillfield Baptist Church as well as a music professor at Virginia State. They had three sons and a daughter.

== Death ==
Jackson died in Petersburg, Virginia, on April 20, 1950, following a heart attack. He is buried in historic Blandford Cemetery, joined by his wife of nearly five decades.

== Legacy ==
His papers and some effects are held by the special collections library of Virginia State University His son Luther Porter Jackson Jr. worked at the Newark Evening News and The Washington Post. and later became the first African American professor at the Columbia University School of Journalism.

The Luther Porter Jackson Black Cultural Center at University of Virginia is named for Jackson. Luther Porter Jackson Middle School in Surry County, Virginia, is also named for Jackson. The school lobby displays memorabilia from the former Luther Porter Jackson High School in Dendron, Virginia. During the early years of Massive Resistance, Cumberland County, Virginia established its Luther Porter Jackson High school in 1952 next to the Cumberland Training Academy (for African Americans). A decade later it built an addition to serve African American students from Prince Edward County, Virginia, where the schools were closed between 1959 and 1964 to avoid court orders requiring integration. After integration, the buildings were converted into an elementary school, which ultimately closed and was sold.

In 1954, Fairfax County, Virginia, established Luther Porter Jackson High School as a high school for African Americans. It became an early integrated school, and now operates as Luther Jackson Middle School.

== Works ==
Books

- The History of the Virginia State Teachers Association (1937)
- A Short History of the Gillfield Baptist Church of Petersburg, Virginia (1941)
- Free Negro Labor and Property Holding in Virginia, 1830-1860 (1942)
- Virginia Negro Soldiers and Seaman in the Revolutionary War (1944)
- Negro Office-Holders in Virginia, 1865-1895 (1945)

Articles

- "Work of the Association and the People." Journal of Negro History 20 (October 1935): 385–96. doi:10.2307/2714255, JSTOR 2714255
- "Early strivings of the Negro in Virginia." Journal of Negro History 25 (January 1940). doi:10.2307/2714399, JSTOR 2714399
- "Unexplored Fields in the History of the Negro in the United States." Negro History Bulletin 8 (December 1944): 57–67. JSTOR 44214353
- "Citizenship Training--A Neglected Area in Adult Education." Journal of Negro Education 14 (summer 1945): 477–87 doi:10.2307/2293018, JSTOR 2293018
- "Race and Suffrage in the South since 1940." New South (June–July 1948): 1–26.
