= List of Fairfax County Public Schools middle schools =

Middle schools in Fairfax County, VA

This list of Fairfax County Public Schools middle schools encompasses public middle schools operated by the Fairfax County Public Schools school district in Virginia, United States.

One middle school, Johnson Middle School, is located in the city of Fairfax. The others are located in incorporated and unincorporated areas in Fairfax County, Virginia.

Many of the middle schools are named after authors, writers, or poets.

== Carson Middle School ==
38°55′38″N 77°25′10″W

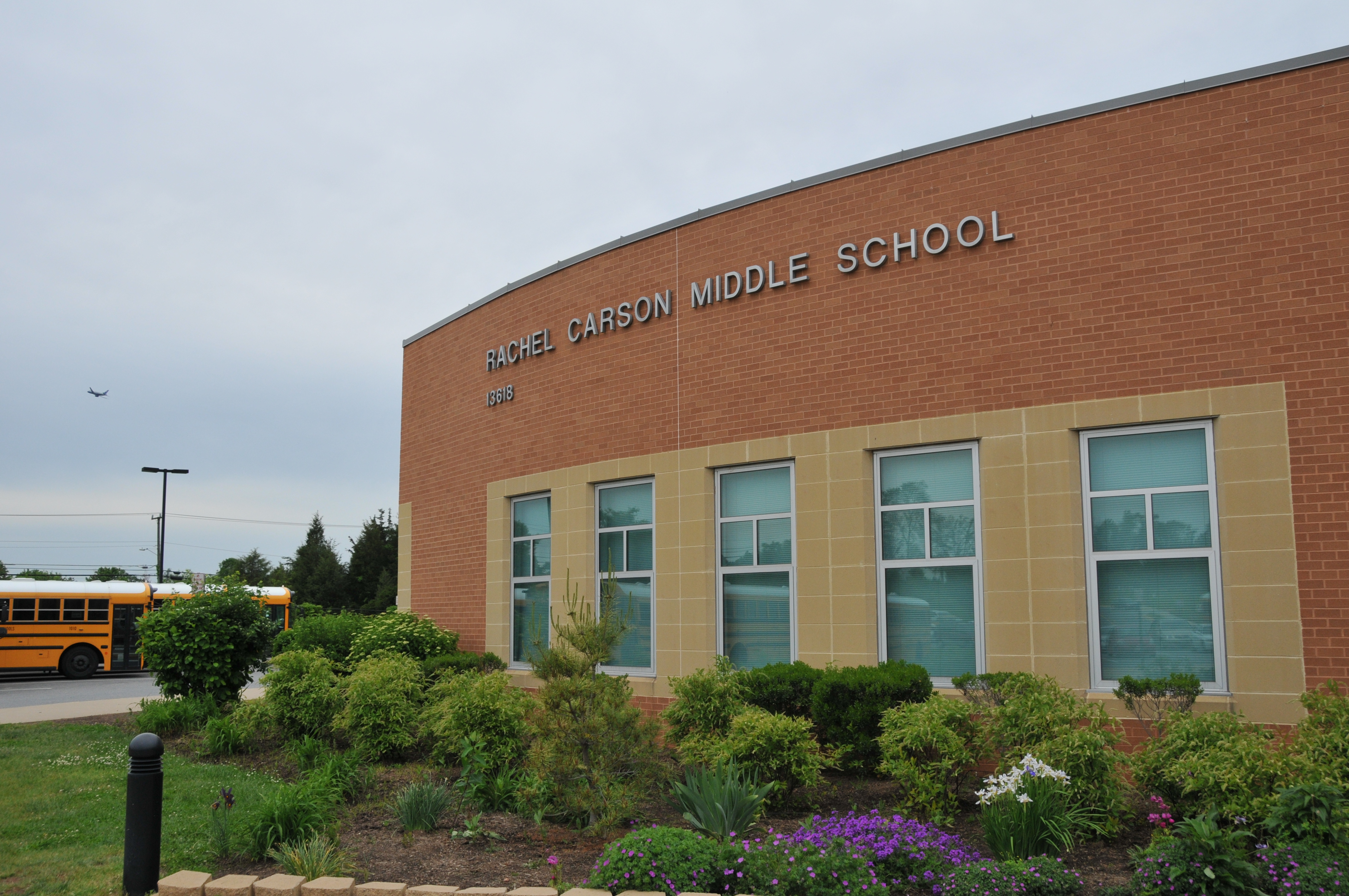
Rachel Carson Middle School in Herndon

Rachel Carson Middle School (Region 1, grades 7–8), is a middle school in Herndon and feeds into Oakton High School.

=== History ===
Planning for a new middle school began in 1994 when the Fairfax County School Board when discussions began for land acquisition in western Fairfax County for a middle school site. The school was originally designed to house 1,250 students.

On May 14, 1998, the Fairfax County School Board voted to name the school after Rachel Carson, an environmentalist and author. Carl Sagan was also one of the finalists as a name for the school.

Carson Middle School was first opened on September 8, 1998 with Gail Womble as the first principal. The school's mascot is the panther, which was chosen by the student body.

=== Administration ===
The current principal of Rachel Carson Middle School is Donald (Tony) Washington. Before being appointed in 2024, Washington was the principal at Forestville Elementary School from 2019-2024.

=== Academics ===
Rachel Carson Middle School is an Advanced Academic Placement (AAP) Center. The school has a wide range of electives to choose from and a large fine and performing arts program. Carson Middle School offers Spanish, French, Chinese, and Japanese foreign language classes.

=== Demographics ===
As of the 2024–25 school year, Carson Middle School has a total of 1,358 students. The school is:

- 43.01% Asian
- 27.69% White
- 10.97% Hispanic or Latino
- 11.78% Black
- 6.55% Other

And by gender:

- 52.58% Male
- 47.42% Female

=== Feeder pattern ===
Carson Middle School is a magnet school, and feeds into four high schools: Chantilly, Oakton, Westfield, and South Lakes.

Elementary schools that feed into RCMS include Oak Hill, Floris, Coates, Crossfield, Navy, McNair, Lees Corner, and Fox Mill.

== Cooper Middle School ==
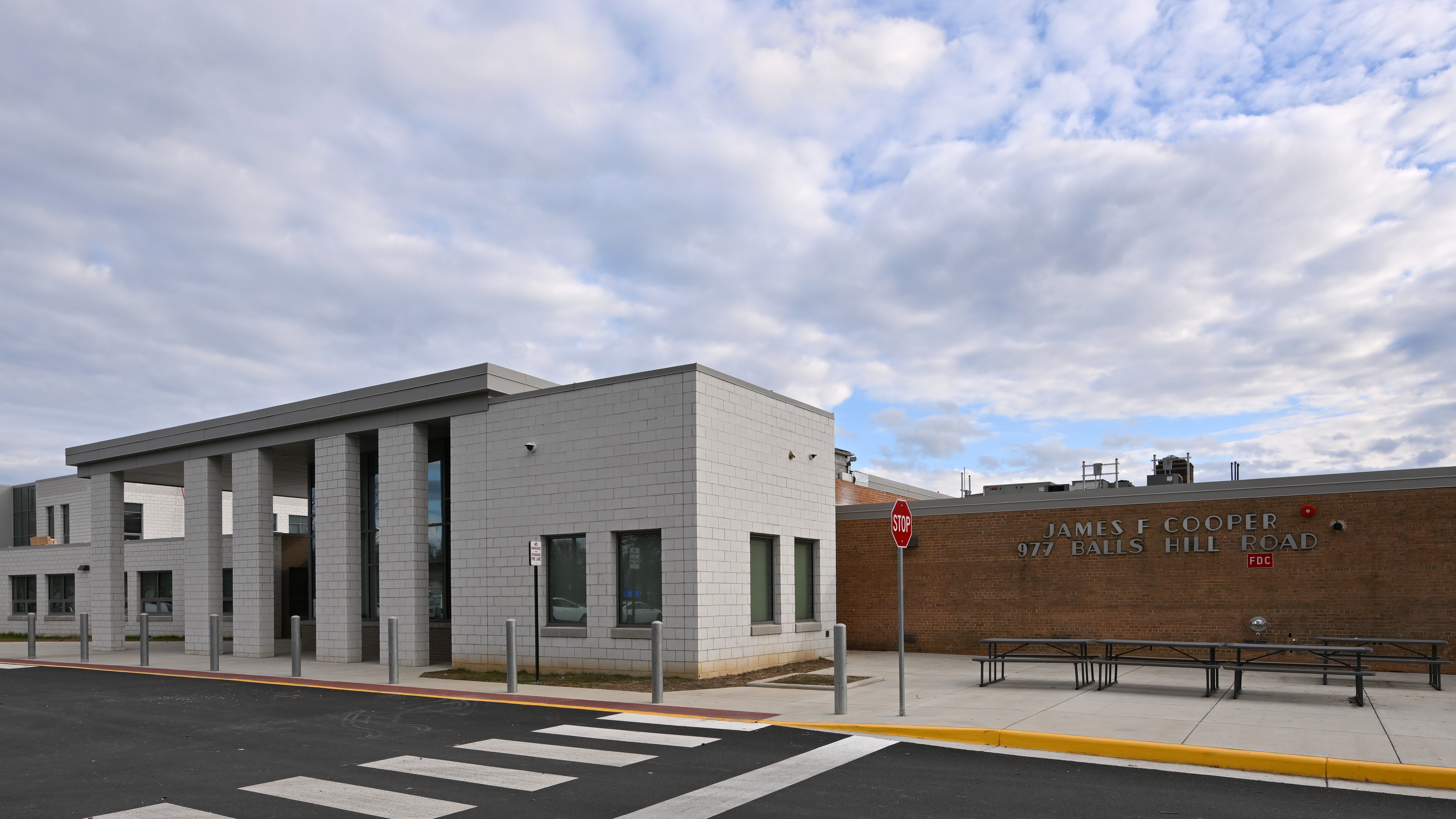
Cooper Middle School in McLean

James Fenimore Cooper Middle School (Region 1, grades 7–8), is a middle school in McLean and feeds into Langley High School.

=== History ===
In 1958, Fairfax County began creating intermediate schools to create a smooth transition between elementary and high school. In 1959, Intermediate School #2 was officially named after American writer James Fenimore Cooper. Construction on Cooper Intermediate School began in December 1961, and opened its doors to students on September 4, 1962, as schools in Fairfax County were integrating. The school's inaugural principal was William D. McKinney. In 1990, Cooper Intermediate became Cooper Middle School. The school was renovated in 1968 and in 2022. New additions from the 2022 renovations include new classrooms, an updated library, and new admin offices. The school's mascot is the cougar, and its school colors are blue, white, and yellow/gold.

=== Administration ===
The current principal of Cooper Middle School is Maureen McLoughlin, successor to Lisa Barrow. Before being appointed principal in the 2024-2025 school year, McLoughlin was the vice principal of Cooper, and was previously the assistant principal at Franklin Middle School. Before arriving at Cooper, McLoughlin worked in the English department. She was the English Department Chair as well as an English teacher at Katherine Johnson Middle School.

The current vice principals are Gregory Brotemarkle (8th grade) and Jennifer Diglio (7th grade). The director of student services is Dana Scabis.

=== Academics ===
James Fenimore Cooper Middle School is an Advanced Academic Placement (AAP) Center. Cooper Middle School offers Chinese, Spanish, French, and Japanese foreign language classes.

The school also offers many after-school programs including academics (Quiz Bowl, Science Bowl, Science Olympiad, Model UN), sports (cross country, basketball, ping pong), and the performing arts (theater). Cooper's Science Olympiad team routinely scores well at regional and state tournaments, and has placed as high as 12th place at nationals.

Cooper also boasts an excellent music program. Most notably, its band has traveled to numerous national and international conventions: attending the Midwest Clinic in 2023, the Virginia Music Educators Association (VMEA) conference in 2017, 2022, and 2025, and the Music For All National Festival in 2019, as the first ever Virginia band to be invited, and again in 2025. They have performed at the White House for its annual Easter Egg Roll, recorded for the Artemis I launch, and received the National Band Association Blue Ribbon Program of Excellence Southern Division Award, the Sudler Silver Cup by the John Philip Sousa Foundation, and title of "Virginia Honor Band" in the inaugural year of the award.

Additionally, they have commissioned numerous pieces from contemporary composers such as Brian Balmages, John Mackey, Johnnie Vinson, and William Owens.

As of early 2026, Cooper Middle School is ranked #18 in Virginia Middle Schools and #5 in Fairfax County Public Schools Middle Schools by US News.

=== Demographics ===
As of the 2025-26 school year, Cooper Middle School has a total of 1071 students. The school is:

- 50.5% White
- 31.5% Asian
- 8.9% Other
- 6.4% Hispanic or Latino
- 2.7% Black

=== Feeder pattern ===
This is the current feeding pattern of Cooper Middle School.

Langley High School

- Cooper Middle School
  - Churchill Road Elementary School
  - Colvin Run Elementary School
  - Forestville Elementary School
  - Great Falls Elementary School
  - Spring Hill Elementary School

== Franklin Middle School ==
Benjamin Franklin Middle School (Region 5, grades 7–8), is a middle school in Chantilly and feeds into Chantilly High School.

Franklin Middle School opened in the fall of 1984 as an intermediate school with the theme “We touch the Future Through the Past and Present.” In the 1990s, Franklin Intermediate became Franklin Middle. The school was named for Benjamin Franklin, and their mascot is the falcons.

Franklin Middle School has been a Governor's School of Educational Excellence since 2007. Franklin Middle School offers Spanish and French foreign language classes.

=== Demographics ===
As of the 2020–21 school year, Franklin Middle School has a total of 899 students. The school is:

- 44.94% White
- 26.25% Asian
- 14.91% Hispanic or Latino
- 7.45% Other
- 6.45% Black

=== Feeder pattern ===
Franklin Middle School feeds into two high schools: Chantilly High School and Oakton High School.

Elementary schools that feed into Franklin include Brookfield, Greenbriar East, Lees Corner, and Oak Hill.

== Frost Middle School ==
38°50′11″N 77°16′24″W

Robert Frost test scores for the 2015–2016 school year
SOL test	Percent passing
Grade 7 English: Reading	93.7%
Grade 7 Math	90.5%
Grade 8 English: Reading	92.7%
Grade 8 Science	94.3%
Grade 8 English: Writing	89.3%
Grade 8 Math	92.6%

Robert Frost Middle School (Region 5, grades 7–8), is a public school named after the poet Robert Frost and located southeast of Fairfax.

Frost is the site of Capital One's Junior Achievement Finance Park at Fairfax County. Eighth graders from neighboring schools often take field trips here.

=== History ===
In 2007, U.S. Supreme Court Justice Antonin Scalia gave a lecture to the Seekers team at Frost. His grandson was a student there at the time. In 2011, Scalia gave another lecture to the Seekers team; his granddaughter was then a student there.

In 2019, Frost started construction on an expansion and renovation of the school. The construction was completed in Winter 2023.

=== Academics ===
Frost is designated as an Advanced Academic Placement (AAP) Center. It is split up into eight interdisciplinary teams, composed of approximately 140 students each.

Frost Middle School was recognized with the Governor's Award of Excellence from 2010 through 2017, and with the Virginia Board of Education Distinguished Achievement Award in 2013. In 2013 the school was recognized with the G.O.L.D.E.N. Wellness Award, as well as the Healthier U.S. School Challenge Bronze Award. The Virginia Music Educators' Association awarded Frost Middle School their Blue Ribbon from 2009 through 2017. Frost has been frequently ranked among the best middle schools in Virginia.

=== Demographics ===
Frost had 1249 students during the 2025–2026 school year. The student body is:

- 47.16% White
- 23.46% Asian
- 13.77% Hispanic or Latino
- 9.29% Other
- 6.33% Black

=== Feeder pattern ===
Most students feed into Frost from Fairfax Villa Elementary School, Oak View Elementary School, Olde Creek Elementary School, Little Run Elementary School, Canterbury Woods Elementary School, Wakefield Forest Elementary School, Mantua Elementary School, Annandale Terrace Elementary School, Braddock Elementary School, and North Springfield Elementary School. Not all students from these schools attend Frost.

Most students feed into W. T. Woodson High School for grades 9–12, but some feed into Annandale High School or Falls Church High School.

== Glasgow Middle School ==
38°50′17″N 77°08′26″W

Glasgow Middle School (Region 2, grades 6–8), is part of the Fairfax County Public Schools system. It was named for the novelist Ellen Glasgow. The school's mascot is the panther. The school colors are blue and gray. Glasgow is the largest middle school in the state of Virginia with over 1700 students.

On January 29, 2008, Glasgow students moved to a new building, built behind the old one. It was originally scheduled to be moved into during winter break, but it was changed until after the second grading quarter ended.

=== Academics ===
Students at Glasgow participate in the International Baccalaureate Middle Years Program (IBMYP), and work towards earning an International Baccalaureate (IB) diploma in high school. Glasgow also offers a Spanish Immersion program for students who have participated in an elementary school immersion program. Some students place into Glasgow for the immersion programs.

Many students opt to stay after school on Mondays, Wednesdays, and Thursdays to participate in extracurricular activities. They participate in various academic teams such as Girls Engineering in Math and Science (GEMS), Science Olympiad, and Math Counts. NJHS (National Junior Honor Society), a service club, is also available, but only for the eighth grade. Students who demonstrate leadership skills and creativity can also run for the Student Government Association (SGA), which decides upcoming events for the school. Elections for representatives take place at the beginning of the year, while elections for officers, such as president, vice president, secretary, or treasurer, take place at the end of the year, for the following year.

=== Feeder Pattern ===
The majority of the students feed into Justice High School in Falls Church. Some students feed into other local high schools such as Annandale High School and Falls Church High School.

== Hayfield Secondary School ==
38°45′0″N 77°8′39″W

Hayfield Secondary School (Region 6, grades 7–12), is a secondary school, but the high school and middle school students are generally kept apart. The middle school has an honors (formally GT) program, and the high school offers both honors and Advanced Placement courses.

As of the spring of 2007, the number of exams on which a score of 3 or higher was achieved (on a scale of 1–5) rose to 57% from 46% the previous year, the best results found on record for Hayfield.

== Herndon Middle School ==
38°58′05″N 77°23′31″W

Herndon Middle School (Region 1, grades 7–8), is in Herndon. It feeds into Herndon High School.

The school has eight academic teams.

As of the 2018–2019 school year, the school uses an odd-even schedule in which students go to even periods one day and odd the next, making each class 90 minutes. Students can choose from a variety of electives to complement their core classes.

The school offers several levels of classes including Honors Geometry, Honors Algebra, French, Spanish, Tech Education ("Shop"), art, and music education.

In 1995 the Herndon Middle School Band, under the direction of Noreen Liennemann, won the prestigious Sudler Cup, presented by the John Philip Sousa Foundation to honor middle school concert bands that have demonstrated high standards of excellence over a period of years.

It was constructed in 1952, and renovations have been made due to the growing population of the community. It includes a historic Cold War-era fallout shelter.

== Holmes Middle School ==
38°48′54″N 77°9′48″W

Oliver Wendell Holmes Middle School (Region 2, grades 6–8), also known as Holmes Middle School, is a public school with an Alexandria address but is outside of the city limits. It is part of the Fairfax County Public Schools system. It is named after the poet Oliver Wendell Holmes Sr. The current principal is Margaret Barnes.

Holmes' 2014–15 student body of 956 was 20.5% African American, 19% White, 20% Asian, 37% Hispanic, and 2.6% other.

Holmes Middle School was founded in 1966. In 1991, additional construction was started. In 2004, a new front area of the building was constructed including a new media center, office, and guidance office. That same year, Holmes became a member of the International Baccalaureate Middle Years Program.

North Springfield Elementary School (Springfield address), Weyanoke Elementary School (Alexandria address), Columbia Elementary School, Parklawn Elementary School and Bren Mar Park Elementary (Alexandria address) feed into Holmes.

Holmes' students move on to Annandale High School in Fairfax County's Annandale community or Edison High School (Alexandria address).

== Langston Hughes Middle School ==
38°56′7″N 77°20′18″W

Langston Hughes Middle School (Region 1, grades 7–8), named for the African-American poet Langston Hughes, is a public school in Reston in unincorporated Fairfax County. The principal is Dr. Herman Mizell. The school was established in 1979 as Langston Hughes Intermediate School and shared a building with South Lakes High School for its first year and part of the second. The mascot is the a Black Panther, and the school colors are navy blue and grey.

The school is built on the same floor plan as Rocky Run Middle School (before Rocky Run was renovated) and feeds into South Lakes High School for grades 9–12. It is an International Baccalaureate Middle Years Program school, which is intended to precede South Lakes's IB curriculum, and is also part of the "Model Campus" of South Lakes and Terraset Elementary school. The three schools share the track and fields.

Elementary schools that feed into Langston Hughes Middle School are Terraset, Sunrise Valley, Forest Edge, Lake Anne, Dogwood, Hunters Woods, and students transfer from nearby Crossfield, Armstrong, Aldrin, Clearview, Dranesville, Herndon, and Hutchison.

In 1998, a student-run prostitution ring was discovered at the middle school, leading to a police investigation. In March, a 13-year-old boy was convicted for organizing a sex-for-hire ring that involved a half dozen of his female classmates.

A music video for a song named "Eastside" by Benny Blanco, Halsey, and Khalid released in 2018 with over 500 million views was partially filmed at the Langston Hughes campus, due to Benny Blanco's relations with the school.

== Irving Middle School ==
Washington Irving Middle School (Region 24 grades 7–8)is a middle school in Springfield. Irving Middle School feeds into West Springfield High School.

=== History ===
In the Fall of 1958, Fairfax County put together a plan to establish intermediate schools. The district planned to open eight by the 1960-61 school year. Early in the intermediate school planning process, it was decided that each school would be named for a famous author or poet. The school was eventually named after Washington Irving in May of 1959. Irving Intermediate School was opened in 1960 as one of the first intermediate schools in Fairfax, with Roy I. Brooks as the first principal. In 1992, all of the intermediate schools in Fairfax were reorganized into middle schools, and Irving Intermediate was renamed Irving Middle.

=== Administration ===
The current principal of Irving Middle School is Cynthia Conley. Before her appointment as principal, she was an assistant principal at Freedom High School in Woodbridge, Virginia and Irving Middle School. In 2018, she was the 2018 Region 4 Outstanding New Principal for Fairfax County Public Schools.

=== Academics ===
Washington Irving Middle School offers the Middle School Immersion Transition Program in German. Irving is also a purple star school.

=== Demographics ===
As of the 2024–25 school year, Irving Middle School has a total of 1,221 students. The school is:

- 50.86% White
- 14.99% Hispanic or Latino
- 13.10% Asian
- 11.30% Black
- 9.75% Other

=== Feeder pattern ===
Irving Middle School is in the West Springfield High School Pyramid.

West Springfield High School

- Washington Irving Middle School
  - Cardinal Forest Elementary School
  - Hunt Valley Elementary School
  - Keene Mill Elementary School
  - Orange Hunt Elementary School
  - Rolling Valley Elementary School
  - West Springfield Elementary School

== Luther Jackson Middle School ==
38°52′06″N 77°13′44″W

Luther Jackson Middle School (Region 2, grades 7–8), located southwest of Falls Church, is one of 26 public middle schools in the county. It opened in 1954 as Luther Jackson High School, the first all-black high school in Fairfax County. This gave Virginia African-American students a closer option than schools in Washington, D.C.

In 1965, when the county was integrated, the school was designated as Luther Jackson Intermediate School, which eventually changed to Luther Jackson Middle School. The school is named after Dr. Luther Porter Jackson an established historian and educator. The mascot is a tiger and the school colors are red and black/white.

The school has transitioned into a GT Center school to reduce overcrowding at Joyce Kilmer Middle School and Robert Frost Middle School. The school converted into an AAP center school.

The AAP center was an option for certain students zoned for either Jackson or Thoreau. Students could choose to go to Jackson if they wanted to participate in the AAP program. In 2018, when redistricting occurred, kids zoned for Jackson Middle School as their base school were moved to Thoreau Middle School as their base school and had the option of still attending Jackson if they wanted the AAP center. As a result, Jackson used to have 3 high school feeders, Oakton High School, Madison High School, or Falls Church High School.

Luther Jackson Middle School has a strong and growing drama department led by Stacey Jones, and has a strong music department. The 2013 musical was Willy Wonka and the 2014 musical was Mulan.

== Katherine Johnson Middle School ==
38°51′36″N 77°19′38″W

Katherine Johnson Middle School (Region 5, grades 7-8) is a City of Fairfax and Fairfax County Public Schools AAP (FCPS Advanced Academics Program) Center-based middle school serving grades 7-8 in Region 5. The school is owned by the City of Fairfax, but implements Fairfax County Public Schools' "educational services, staffing, transportation, and food services."

NASA research mathematician Katherine Johnson is the school's namesake. Until 2021, the school was named for American poet and Confederate soldier Sidney Lanier. Katherine Johnsons Middle Schools's principal is Chris Smith. Many students who attend Katherine Johnson move on to Fairfax High School. It is fed by Willow Springs, Daniels Run, Providence, Colin Powell, Greenbriar East students who do not live in the Greenbriar subdivision, Eagle View, and Mosaic Elementary Schools.

The school has eight teams in total; for 7th grade: Patriots, Captains, Spartans and Hokies; and for 8th Grade: Highlanders, Nighthawks, Panthers, and Cavaliers. Each team is named after a Virginia College mascot. KJMS's mascot is the eagle.

The school has four orchestras and four band programs.

== Francis Scott Key Middle School ==
38°46′48″N 77°9′41″W

Francis Scott Key test scores for the 2005–2006 school year
SOL test	Percent passing
Grade 7 English: Reading	81%
Grade 7 Math	36%
Grade 8 English: Reading	78%
Grade 8 Science	82%
Grade 8 English: Writing	93%
Grade 8 Math	76%

Francis Scott Key Middle School (Region 3, grades 7–8) is a public school in Springfield which feeds into John R. Lewis High School.

Key's 2014–2015 student body of 887 was 40.92% Hispanic, 24.13% Asian, 17.93% White, 12.85% Black, and 4.17% other.

A total of 41% of teachers have a bachelor's degree, 59% have a master's degree, and less than 1% have a doctorate degree. The school has a 96% attendance rate.

There are six teams at Key: three in the seventh grade (7A – The Adventurers, 7B – The Bulldogs, 7C – The Champs), and three in the eighth grade.

== Kilmer Middle School ==
gion:US 38°54′15″N 77°13′31″W

Joyce Kilmer Middle School (Region 2, grades 7–8) is a public school named after the journalist and poet Alfred Joyce Kilmer (1886-1918).

The school feeds into James Madison High School, Oakton High School, George C. Marshall High School, Langley High School, and McLean High School.

Elementary schools that primarily feed into Kilmer Middle School include: Lemon Road Elementary School, Shrevewood Elementary School, Stenwood Elementary School, Vienna Elementary School, Westbriar Elementary School, Westgate Elementary School, Freedom Hill Elementary School, and Louise Archer Elementary School.

The mascot of Joyce Kilmer Middle School is the Cougar.

The current principal of Joyce Kilmer Middle School is Steven McFarlane.

=== School Programs ===
Kilmer Middle School has a Student Government Association (SGA). The group serves as a liaison between the student body and school administration. The SGA is composed of officers and representatives. Officers include the 7th & 8th Grade Presidents & Vice Presidents, a treasurer, and a secretary.

Kilmer is a designated Advanced Academics Program (AAP) Level IV Center. As of 2026, Kilmer consistently ranks in the Top 10 public middle schools in Fairfax County and the Top 40 in Virginia.

Kilmer Middle School has a program where School Students Get “Written Up” for Good Behavior. These kinds of write-ups, called “Positive Referrals,” happen frequently at Kilmer. The students also receive a coupon with the write-up, which they can spend on a piece of candy or bag of chips in the school cafeteria.

The school offers many electives for 7th and 8th graders, including Family And Consumer Sciences (Home EC), Drama, Tech Tools, Inventions and Innovations, Technological Systems, and Advanced Technology Tools.

Kilmer is also known for its outstanding band and orchestra program. Under the direction of conductor Sharon Bonneau, the Kilmer Symphonic band has been recognized as one of the best middle school bands in the state. The Kilmer Symphonic Orchestra, led by conductor Robert Katz has been recognized as one of the best middle school orchestras in the state. Orchestra classes at Kilmer (least to most advanced) include String Ensemble 1, String Ensemble 2, Concert Orchestra, Chamber Orchestra, and Symphonic Orchestra. Chamber Orchestra and Symphonic Orchestra are both advanced-level classes. Additionally, Kilmer has a choir program led by Kevin Sapp.

=== Demographics and Statistics ===
Kilmer's student body of approximately 1200 as of 2026 is 41.7% White, 26.3% Asian, 18.3% Hispanic, 4.8% Black, and less than 1% Native American. 22% of Kilmer students are recognized as economically disadvantaged.

48% of the teachers have a bachelor's degrees, and 52% have master's degrees. There are 88 full-time certified teachers with a student to teacher ratio of 14:1.

=== Administration ===
The Kilmer Middle School administration is consisted of Principal Steven McFarlane, Assistant Principal Emily Castro, Assistant Principal Erin Kestler, Assistant Principal Nishi Langhorne, and Director of Student Services Sarah Groh. Additionally, Kilmer's Office of Student Services include Brian Sirdofsky (7th grade counselor L-Z), Cara Engel (7th grade counselor A-K), Kristen Reighard (8th grade counselor L-Z), and Kara Prokopius (8th grade counselor A-K).

=== No contact rule controversy ===
In June 2007, Kilmer Middle School attracted national controversy after a 13-year-old student was reprimanded for putting his arm around his girlfriend during a break. The school had a strict policy of "no physical contact", meaning that contact such as high fives or hugs between friends are not allowed. Despite opposition from some parents and students, and coverage on Fox News, CNN, Time and The Washington Post, the school system and the former principal of the school, Deborah Strayhorn, stood behind the rule and refused to rescind it.

== Lake Braddock Secondary School ==
38°48′12″N 77°15′56″W

Lake Braddock Secondary School is a combined junior high and high school in Burke administered by Fairfax County Public Schools. It is one of three secondary schools in Fairfax County, the other two being Hayfield Secondary School and Robinson Secondary School. Opened in 1973, Lake Braddock has recently completed an extensive renovation project. Its mascot is the bruin bear, and the school colors are purple and gold.

== Liberty Middle School ==
38°48′19″N 77°25′4″W

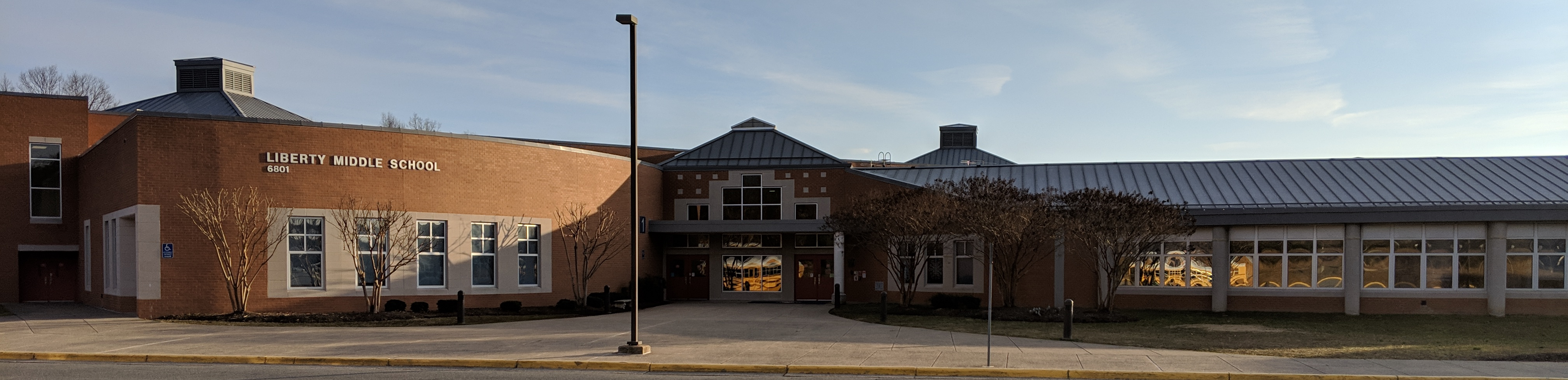
Liberty Middle School in Clifton

Liberty Middle School (Region 4, grades 7–8) is one of the feeder middle schools for Centreville High School. They are located on the same road, less than two miles apart.

The school requires four core classes (Math, Science, History, and English) and P.E. for each student. Students can choose 2–4 electives (2 full year electives or 1 full year and 2 half semester electives or 4 half semester electives). However, some electives are only for a semester or quarter instead of a full year, in which case a student may take more electives.

Of 1100+ students (2006–2007), 77% were White, 3% were Black, 13% were Asian, and 7% were Hispanic.

The school has eight teams; in 7th grade there are the Patriots, Pride, Navigators, and Explorers; and in 8th grade there are the Rockets, Wizards, Eagles, and Comets.

== Longfellow Middle School ==
38°54′34″N 77°10′27″W

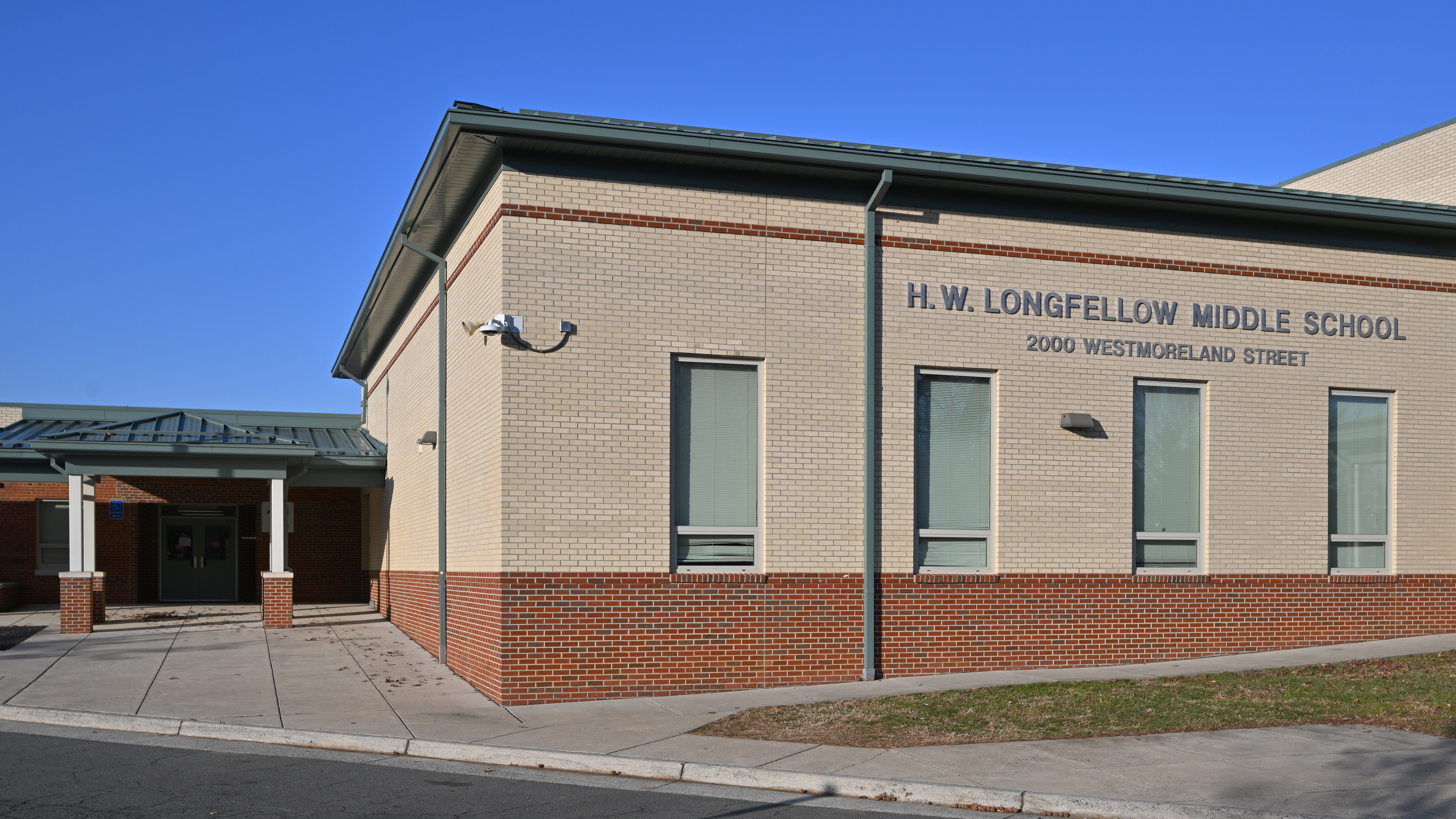
H.W. Longfellow Middle School in Falls Church

Henry Wadsworth Longfellow Middle School (Region 2, grades 7–8), north of Falls Church, is a public school named after the poet Henry Wadsworth Longfellow, located in Region 2. The school's mascot is the Lancer.

Carole Kihm became principal on May 19, 2008 and was named the 2014 Outstanding Middle School Principal of Virginia by the Virginia Association of Secondary School Principals.

=== Academics ===
Longfellow Middle has five bands: Beginner Band, Cadet Band, Concert Band, Wind Ensemble, and Symphonic Band. The Wind Ensemble, Concert Band, and Symphonic Band regularly compete in annual competitions at Busch Gardens Williamsburg Amusement Park and Kings Dominion Amusement Park. The Longfellow Bands have won several awards in these competitions, and in June 2017 the Wind Ensemble, Concert Band, and Symphonic Band received 1st-place accolades at the Busch Gardens competition. At the annual District Assessment, the Longfellow Symphonic band has consistently received a rating of I (Superior).

Longfellow's orchestra program is also accomplished, with Longfellow's Chamber orchestra winning the Middle School Division at the 2012 National Orchestra Festival in Atlanta. It offers five orchestras, with Chamber orchestra being the most advanced. The Concert, Symphonic, and Chamber orchestras have regularly received I (Superior) ratings at the District Assessments. In 2018, the Longfellow Chamber Orchestra was invited to perform at the Midwest Clinic in Chicago, Illinois as one of only three middle schools worldwide attending that year.

The list of after-school activities at Longfellow consists of a diverse selection of clubs, from sports such as archery and basketball, to fine arts like the Art/Clay Club, Battle of the Books, and the Crochet Club, and competitive clubs including the Debate Club, Math Counts, Model UN, and Science Olympiad, as of February 2025. The Science Bowl and Quiz Bowl team both took second in 2012 at each respective national tournament, while its History Bowl team won first place. In 2012, Tajin Rogers from Longfellow won the first-ever National History Bee. Its Science Olympiad team has won the state tournament 19 times, placing fifth at the national tournament in 2022 and 2023.

Longfellow Middle School has been honored with the Governor's Award for Excellence in Education from 2010 through 2018. The school was also awarded the Virginia Board of Education Excellence Award in 2013.

=== Demographics ===
The student body in 2018–2019 had 1848 students and was 27% Asian, 51% White, 12% Hispanic or Latino, 3% Black, and 7% other, with a total student body of 1319 (659 7th graders and 660 8th graders).

=== Feeder Pattern ===
Elementary schools that feed into Longfellow include Chesterbrook, Haycock, Kent Gardens, Franklin Sherman, and Timberlane. Some students may come from Lemon Road, Westgate, Spring Hill, Colvin Run, and Churchill Road Elementary schools due to districting. Most of Longfellow's students go on to enroll at McLean High School, but some attend Langley High School, Marshall High School.

== Edgar Allan Poe Middle School ==
38°49′15″N 77°11′12″W

Edgar Allan Poe Middle School (Region 2, grades 6–8) is named after author Edgar Allan Poe. Its mascot is the raven. Sarah Eqab is the current principal as of March 2025.

Most students feed into Annandale High School, Justice High School, or Falls Church High School.

Poe's 881 students during the 2014–2015 school year were 49.04% Hispanic, 12.26% White, 24.29% Asian, 12.26% Black, and 2.16% unspecified. During the same school year, 71.96% of the student body received free/reduced-priced meals and 34.73% were classified as having limited English.

== James W. Robinson, Jr. Secondary School ==
38°48′59″N 77°18′10″W

James W. Robinson, Jr. Secondary School, the largest school in Virginia, includes a middle school (grades 7–8) and a high school (grades 9–12), and was named after Medal of Honor recipient James W. Robinson Jr.

Robinson opened in September 1971, taking its students from Oakton High School, Wilbert Tucker Woodson High School, West Springfield High School, and Fairfax High School. It was the second of Fairfax County's large "superschools," or secondary schools, which housed grades 7–12. Robinson's chief rival to the east, Lake Braddock Secondary School, which opened in 1973, was the third of these schools from this era, the first of which was Hayfield, near Mount Vernon, which opened in 1969. The most recent addition to the series of secondary schools is South County in Lorton, which opened in 2005, taking its students from former Hayfield territory. With the opening of South County Middle School, the high school has since adopted "South County High School" as its official name.

== Rocky Run Middle School ==
38°52′27″N 77°24′36″W

Rocky Run Middle School first opened in 1980. Rocky Run Middle School (Region 5, grades 7–8) accommodates 1316 students as of June 2018. It is named after a creek that runs through the nearby neighborhood.

Rocky Run is an AAP (FCPS Advanced Academics Program) middle school fed by Greenbriar East elementary school graduates who live in the Greenbriar subdivision, some Brookfield Elementary School students, Greenbriar West AAP students who live in the Greenbriar subdivision, and Poplar Tree Elementary School graduates.. The school primarily feeds into Chantilly HS. However, some students also attend Centreville, Fairfax, Westfield and Robinson High Schools due in part to "overcapacity" issues at Chantilly High School.

There are six teams at Rocky Run, three per grade.

In 2018, Fairfax County commenced a $47.6 million renovation of Rocky Run, which temporarily closed several classrooms. To accommodate the temporary displacement, FCPS built a set of trailers called Ramsville, placing them on the back blacktop of the school. Ramsville has since been removed. Ramsville was composed of 7 big trailers with 4 rooms each, 1 smaller trailer with 2 rooms, and a bathroom trailer. This renovation added a two-floor addition and completely revamped the front of the school.

== Carl Sandburg Middle School ==
38°43′43″N 77°3′43″W

Carl Sandburg Middle School (Region 3, grades 7–8), named after poet Carl Sandburg, is located south of Alexandria. In 1985, Fort Hunt High School was renamed Carl Sandburg Middle School.

== South County Middle School ==
38°43′18″N 77°14′43″W

South County Middle School is located in Lorton. It opened in September 2012 on a 40-acre site as a stand-alone middle school with a capacity of 1,350 students.

From 2005 to June 2012, 7th and 8th grade students were enrolled at South County Secondary School (now South County High School), which housed both middle and high school programs.

The school mascot is the mustang, while the school colors are green, blue, and burgundy.

== Ormond Stone Middle School ==
38°51′27″N 77°27′17″W

Ormond Stone Middle School (Region 5, grades 7–8), is located in Centreville.

The school is named after astronomer, mathematician, and educator Ormond Stone. Stone opened its doors in 1991.

The principal of Stone Middle School since 2022 has been Sonya Williams.

== Henry David Thoreau Middle School ==
38°53′20″N 77°14′25″W

Henry David Thoreau Middle School (Region 1, grades 7–8), is located east of Vienna. It opened in 1960.

Thoreau is a feeder school for James Madison High School, George C. Marshall High School and Oakton High School. Because of the 2008 redistricting in Fairfax County, some of Thoreau's students (who previously lived in the James Madison High School district) were redistricted to Hughes Middle School and South Lakes High School. In 2018, due to new redistricting, some students were redistricted from Jackson Middle School to Thoreau Middle School.

The principal is Teresa Khuluki.

Thoreau offers several advanced classes, including French 1, Spanish 1, Algebra 1, and Geometry. Thoreau's electives include Drama, Band, STEM Solutions, AVID, Family and Consumer Sciences, and Art. Students in both 7th and 8th grade are able to take honors classes for all core classes (foreign languages are not included).

== Mark Twain Middle School ==
38°47′24″N 77°06′51″W

Mark Twain Middle School (Region 3, grades 7–8), is located south of Alexandria. It feeds into Thomas A. Edison High School. The school has 837 students. The school is named after the author Mark Twain.

Twain students are assigned to teams of approximately 125. Each team is coordinated by the four core teachers (from English, mathematics, science and social studies), a school counselor and an administrator based on last name. They are the Highlanders, Patriots, Pirates, Cavaliers, Hokies, Spartans, Panthers, and Lancers.

Mark Twain Middle offers the Gifted and Talented program, Special Education program, and ESOL.

As of 2024, the school's racial/ethnic breakdown was 13% Asian, 17% black, 32% Hispanic, 30% white, and 8% other.

== Walt Whitman Middle School ==
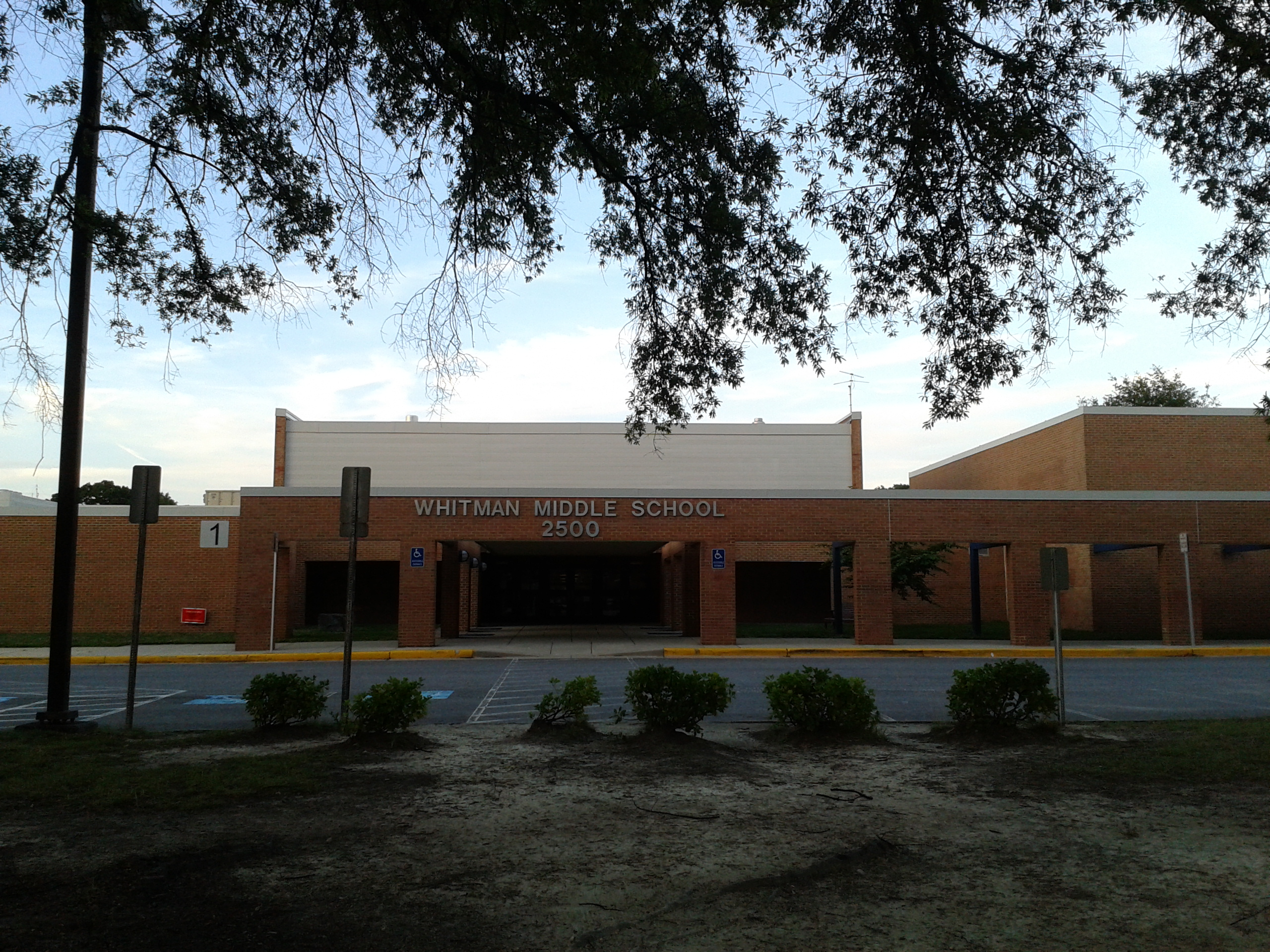
Walt Whitman Middle School in Alexandria

Walt Whitman Middle School is a middle school in Alexandria. Whitman Middle School is located in Region 3 and feeds into Mount Vernon High School. The school serves students in grades 7 and 8.

=== History ===
In 1958, Fairfax County began creating intermediate schools to create a smooth transition between elementary and high school. In 1959, Intermediate School #2 was officially named after American poet Walt Whitman. Whitman Intermediate was opened on September 5, 1961, on Old Mount Vernon Road. In 1973, The school switched locations with Mount Vernon High School; this remained the school's location until 1985. Due to declining populations in the eastern side of the county, Whitman was closed. After rezoning, Stephen Foster (named for musician Stephen Foster) Intermediate was renamed Walt Whitman Intermediate in the fall of 1985. The original school existed school's inaugural principal was William D. McKinney. In 1990, Whitman Intermediate became Whitman Middle School.

=== Administration ===
The current principal of Whitman Middle School is John Flowers. Before being appointed principal in 2023, Flowers was the principal of the High School Ahead Academy. in the Houston Independent School District. He was also the principal at Highland Heights Elementary School in Houston ISD and an assistant principal in Houston ISD and Spring ISD.

=== Academics ===
Walt Whitman Middle School is an International Baccalaureate Middle Years Program (IBMYP) World School. Whitman also has an Advancement Via Individual Determination (AVID) program. Walt Whitman Middle School offers French, German, and Spanish foreign language classes.

=== Demographics ===
As of the 2023-24 school year, Whitman Middle School has a total of 819 students. The school is:

- 50.3% Hispanic or Latino
- 22.3% Black
- 17.2% White
- 4.3% Asian
- 3.7% Multiple Races
- 0.9% American Indian
- 0.7% Native Hawaiian

=== Feeder pattern ===
This is the current feeding pattern of Whitman Middle School.

Mount Vernon High School

- Walt Whitman Middle School
  - Fort Belvoir Upper School
    - Fort Belvoir Primary School
  - Mount Vernon Woods Elementary School
  - Riverside Elementary School
  - Washington Mill Elementary School
  - Woodlawn Elementary School
  - Woodley Hills Elementary School
