= List of University of Richmond people =

This is a list of notable alumni and people associated with the University of Richmond, listed alphabetically by surname.

== Sports ==
- Bruce Allen – president, Washington Commanders
- Kendall Anthony – basketball player in the Israeli National League
- Kenny Atkinson – head coach, Cleveland Cavaliers
- Shawn Barber – linebacker, Philadelphia Eagles
- Tim Bezbatchenko – general manager, Toronto FC (MLS) (2013–2019), Columbus Crew (2019 –)
- Joe Biscaha – NFL and AFL end (1959–1960)
- Mike Bragg – NFL player, Washington Redskins (1968–1979), punter
- Lew Burdette – MLB pitcher (1950–67), Most Valuable Player of the 1957 World Series
- Sean Casey – MLB first baseman (1997–2008), 3-time All-Star
- Erik Christensen – NFL end (1956)
- T. J. Cline – professional basketball player
- Dick Cooke – college baseball coach at Belmont Abbey and Davidson
- Jonathan de Marte – professional baseball player
- Joe Douglas – NFL executive, General Manager of the New York Jets
- Ray Easterling – NFL free safety (1972–1979)
- Kevin Eastman – assistant coach, Boston Celtics
- Ben Edwards – American football player
- Reggie Evans – NFL running back (1983)
- Tim Finchem – commissioner, PGA Tour
- Walker Gillette – NFL wide receiver (1970–1976)
- Jacob Gilyard – NBA point guard, Brooklyn Nets
- Justin Harper – professional basketball player
- Shaun Herock – NFL executive, Green Bay Packers
- Tim Hightower – running back, New Orleans Saints
- John Hilton – NFL tight end (1965–1973)
- Brian Jordan – MLB player (1992–2006)
- Matt Joyce – NFL offensive lineman (1995–2004)
- George Kokinis – general manager, Cleveland Browns
- Kyle Lauletta – quarterback, New York Giants, Philadelphia Eagles, Cleveland Browns
- Paris Lenon – linebacker, Arizona Cardinals
- Matt Llano – long-distance runner
- Gregg Marshall – men's basketball head coach, Wichita State University
- Renie Martin – pitcher, Kansas City Royals, San Francisco Giants, Philadelphia Phillies
- Todd McShay – ESPN NFL draft analyst
- Marc Megna – NFL player, New York Jets (1999), New England Patriots (1999), Cincinnati Bengals (1999), New England Patriots (2000), Montreal Alouettes (2002–2006)
- Bret Myers – soccer player and professor
- Johnny Newman – NBA player (1986–2002)
- Jeff Nixon – NFL player (1979–81)
- Barry Redden – NFL player, 1st round draft pick LA Rams (1982–1990)
- Jacob Ruby – CFL player, Edmonton Eskimos
- John Schweitz – NBA player
- Lawrence Sidbury, Jr. – defensive end, Atlanta Falcons
- Barty Smith – NFL running back, Green Bay Packers
- Mike Smith – pitcher, Minnesota Twins
- Matt Snider (class of 1999) – NFL fullback (1999–2002), Green Bay, Minnesota, Houston
- Tim Stauffer – pitcher, San Diego Padres organization, fourth overall pick in the 2003 Major League Baseball draft
- Margaret Stender – president, Chicago Sky
- Benjy Taylor – men's basketball head coach, Chicago State University
- Brendan Toibin – NFL kicker (1987)
- Stacy Tutt – fullback, New York Jets
- Colin Vint – League of Ireland forward (2006)
- Eric Ward – quarterback, Edmonton Eskimos
- Seth Williams – cornerback, Montreal Alouettes
- Kerry Wynn – defensive end, New York Giants
- Craig Ziadie – Major League Soccer defender (2001–2004)

== Law, politics and government ==
=== Heads and deputy heads of states, governments, cabinet members and royalty ===
- Michael Dunkley – premier of Bermuda, 2014–2017

=== U.S. state governors ===
- Tim Kaine (adjunct professor) – 70th governor of Virginia (2006–2010); U.S. senator from Virginia (2013–); chair of the Democratic National Committee (2009–2011)
- Andrew Jackson Montague – 44th governor of Virginia, 1902–1906; U.S. representative, 1913–1937
- John Garland Pollard – 51st governor of Virginia (1930–1934), 21st attorney general of Virginia (1914–1918)

=== U.S. senators ===
- Absalom Robertson – U.S. senator, 1946–1966

=== U.S. representatives ===
- Watkins Abbitt – U.S. representative from Virginia, 1948–1973
- M. Caldwell Butler – U.S. representative, 1972–1983
- Thomas Garrett, Jr. – U.S. representative, 2017–2019; Virginia state senator, 2011–2017
- J. Vaughan Gary – U.S. representative, 1945–1965
- Virgil Goode – U.S. representative, 1997–2009
- Menalcus Lankford – U.S. representative, 1929–1933
- Jennifer McClellan – U.S. representative, 2023–present; Virginia state senator, 2017–2023; member, Virginia House of Delegates, 2006–2017
- Owen B. Pickett – U.S. representative, 1987–2001
- Dave E. Satterfield, Jr. – U.S. representative, 1937–1945
- David E. Satterfield III – U.S. representative, 1965–1981
- John Ambler Smith – U.S. representative, 1873–1875
- Joseph Whitehead – U.S. representative, 1925–1931

=== Others ===
- Ward Armstrong – member, Virginia House of Delegates, 1992–2012
- Harry L. Carrico (visiting professor 1956–1961) – 23rd chief justice of Virginia
- Teresa M. Chafin – justice of the Supreme Court of Virginia
- James Comey (adjunct professor) – 7th director of the Federal Bureau of Investigation
- Marla Graff Decker (J.D.) – 12th Virginia secretary of Public Safety; judge of the Virginia Court of Appeals
- Jenna Ellis – attorney
- J. Steven Griles – deputy secretary for the U.S. Department of the Interior, 2001–2005
- Mark Herring – attorney general of Virginia, 2014–2022
- Kelley B. Hodge – judge of the United States District Court for the Eastern District of Pennsylvania
- William J. Howell – speaker, Virginia House of Delegates, 2003–2018
- Kash Patel (B.A.) – 9th director of the Federal Bureau of Investigation; chief of staff to the U.S. Secretary of Defense
- Qasim Rashid (J.D.) – attorney, activist and author
- Michael Stinziano – member of Ohio House of Representatives
- Mary Sue Terry – attorney general of Virginia, 1986–1993
- Robert E. Trono – deputy director of the United States Marshals Service, 2006–2009
- Samuel Grayson Wilson – judge of the United States District Court for the Western District of Virginia

== Business and nonprofit ==
- Leslie M. Baker, Jr. (1964) – Wachovia Corporation president and CEO
- Blair Brandt – Next Step Realty co-founder and CEO
- Ting Kwok David Ho – Harmony Airways founder
- Robert S. Jepson Jr – Georgia Ports Authority chair; Jepson Corporation founder and CEO
- Frank E. Resnik (MS, 1955) – Philip Morris USA chairman and CEO
- Edwin Claiborne Robins Sr. – A.H. Robins CEO
- Michael Walrath (Class of 1997) – Right Media founder and CEO; Yext Inc. chairman
- Brett Wigdortz OBE (B.A. 1995) – CEO and founder of Teach First

== Humanities, arts and media ==
- Josh Abramson – co-founder of CollegeHumor
- Steve Buckingham – multiple Grammy-winning record producer and music executive
- Kelly Corrigan – author of Glitter and Glue
- Paul Duke – journalist, known for his 20-year stint as moderator of Washington Week in Review on PBS
- Dave East – rapper, songwriter, actor
- Douglas S. Freeman – two-time Pulitzer Prize-winning author and historian
- Fiona Givens – writer who focuses on the history and theology of the Church of Jesus Christ of Latter-day Saints
- Earl Hamner – author of Spencer's Mountain; creator of television shows The Waltons and Falcon Crest
- George Frederick Holmes – former professor, first chancellor of the University of Mississippi
- Bruce Hornsby – singer, known for his association with the Grateful Dead; briefly attended UR but did not graduate
- Patrick Kilpatrick – actor, known for playing the role of The Sandman in the 1990 film Death Warrant
- Lil Dicky – rapper, comedian, and actor
- Jamie McShane – actor, known for roles in SEAL Team, Bloodline, Sons of Anarchy, Bosch, and Southland, the Marvel Cinematic Universe (MCU) films Thor (2011) and The Avengers (2012) as Agent Jackson, Wednesday as Sheriff Galpin
- Allan Nixon – actor and novelist
- Wesley Schultz – lead vocalist for the folk rock band The Lumineers
- Grant Shaud – actor, known for playing the role of Miles Silverberg on the 1990s TV sitcom Murphy Brown
- Ron Smith – poet, author, former Poet Laureate of Virginia (2016–2018)
- Ukee Washington – news co-anchor in Philadelphia

== Science and technology ==
- Saul Krugman – scientist, conducted pioneering research on hepatitis B vaccine
- William C. Martin – atomic spectroscopist
- Leland D. Melvin – NASA astronaut
- Alice T. Schafer – former president of Association for Women in Mathematics, namesake of its national prize for undergraduates
- Douglas D. Taylor – entrepreneur and former academic researcher in the field of extracellular vesicles

== Academics ==
- Ronald J. Bacigal (professor) – legal scholar and professor of law
- Frederic William Boatwright (M.A. 1888) – president of Richmond College
- Aubrey H. Camden (B.A. 1911) – 2nd president of Hargrave Military Academy (1918–1951)
- Joseph Hathaway Cosby (B.A. 1929) – 3rd president of Hargrave Military Academy (1951–1970)
- Claybrook Cottingham (B.A. and M.A., ca. 1902) – president of Louisiana College in Pineville and Louisiana Tech University in Ruston
- Mirta Martin (M.B.A. 1992) – 9th president of Fort Hays State University
- J. Hillis Miller, Sr. (A.B. 1924) – president of Keuka College (1935–1941); 4th president of the University of Florida (1948–1953)
- Greg Morrisett (B.S. 1989) – dean and vice provost of Cornell Tech
- Robert V. Remini (Visiting professor) – American historian and professor of history
- T. Ryland Sanford – 1st president of Hargrave Military Academy (1911–1918)

== Religion ==
- Charles Stanley – pastor of the historic First Baptist Church in Atlanta, Georgia; president of InTouch Ministries; president of the Southern Baptist Convention
- Leonard Sweet – author and theologian
