= Charles Warren (disambiguation) =

Charles Warren (1840–1927) was a British Army officer and head of the London Metropolitan Police.

Charles Warren may also refer to:

- Charles Warren (California politician) (1927–2019), California state assemblyman and chairman of the Council on Environmental Quality
- Charles Warren (engraver) (1762–1823), English line engraver
- Charles Warren (golfer) (born 1975), American golfer
- Charles Warren (author) (1868–1954), American legal historian, winner of the Pulitzer Prize
- Charles B. Warren (1870–1936), American diplomat and politician
- C. E. T. Warren (1912–1988), British author and Second World War Royal Navy submariner
- Charles Hyde Warren (1877–1950), American geologist
- Charles Marquis Warren (1912–1990), American film director, writer and producer
- Charles R. Warren, American schoolteacher
- Charles Warren (MP) (1764–1829), English barrister and politician, judge and amateur cricketer
- Charles Warren (cricketer, born 1843) (1843–1919), English clergyman and cricketer
- Charles Henry Warren (1798–1874), Massachusetts attorney, politician and judge
- Charles Howard Warren (1856–1935), American railroad and insurance executive
- Charles E. Warren (1962–2005), professor of biochemistry and molecular biology
- C. Denier Warren (1889–1971), Anglo-American actor
- Charlie Warren (cricketer) (Charles Christopher Morel Warren, born 1979), Irish cricketer
