= Charlie Warren =

Charlie Warren is the name of:

- Charlie Warren (cricketer), Irish cricketer
- Charlie Warren (footballer), English footballer
