= Wheeler Baker =

Wheeler Baker may refer to:

- Wheeler L. Baker (born 1938), U.S. Marine and president of Hargrave Military Academy
- Wheeler R. Baker (born 1946), member of the Maryland House of Delegates
