= Thomas Sanford =

Thomas Sanford may refer to:

- Thomas Jacob Sanford, the man responsible for the 2025 Grand Blanc Township church attack
- Thomas W. L. Sanford, American plasma physicist
- Thomas Denny Sanford (1935–2026), American businessman and philanthropist
- T. Ryland Sanford, president and founder of the Chatham Training School, now Hargrave Military Academy
