= Fork Union Military Academy =

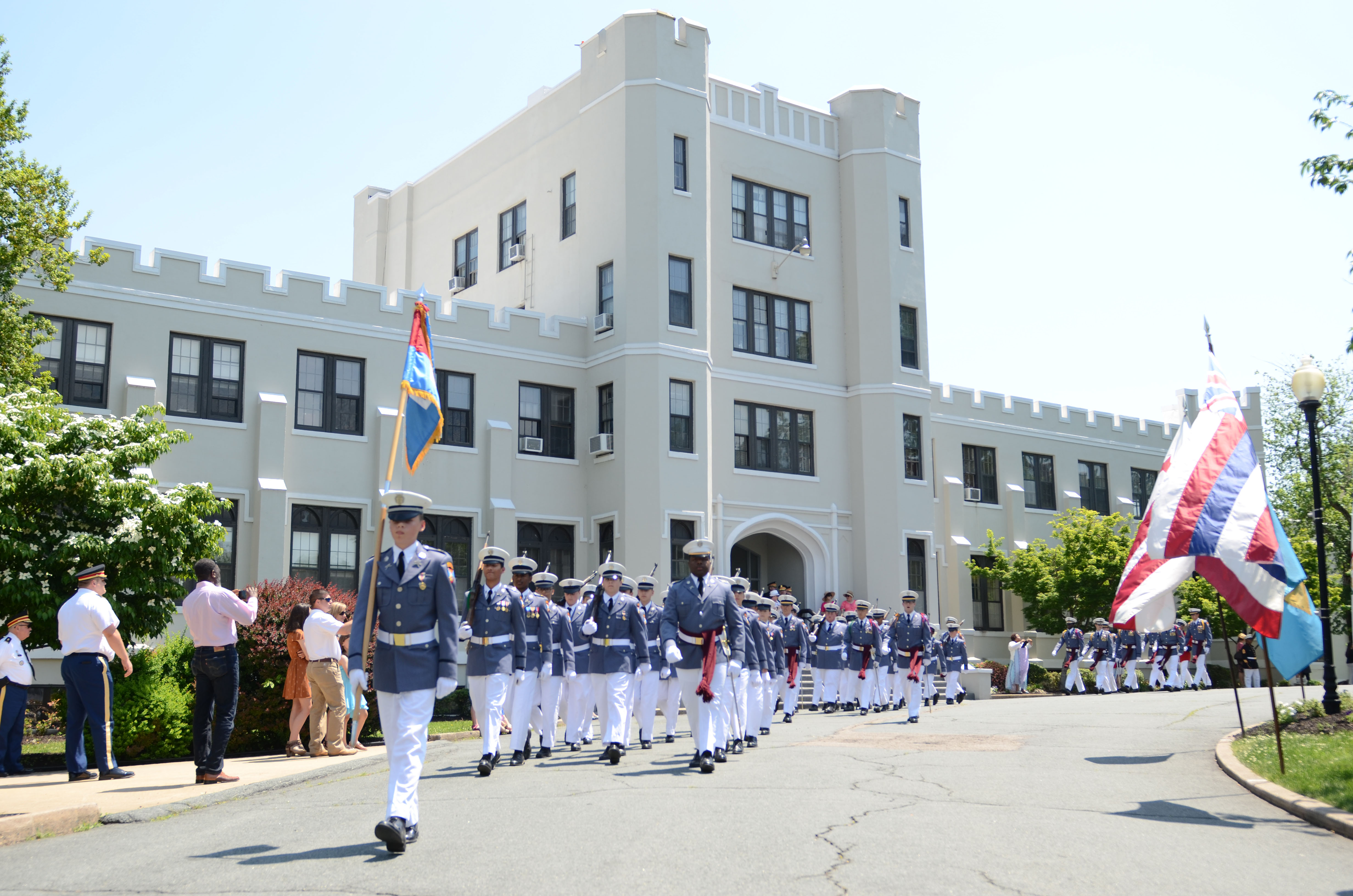
- Cadets march in formation for the annual Mothers Day Parade at Fork Union Military Academy in May 2018

Location
- 4744 James Madison Highway; Fork Union, Virginia; United States; 37°45′40.7″N 78°15′37.6″W

Information
- Type: Military academy; College preparatory; Boarding school; Private school; Military high school
- Motto: Body, Mind, and Spirit
- Established: 1898
- Founder: William E. Hatcher
- President: Col. Stephen Macek (Acting President)
- Dean: C'Ta DeLaurier
- Commandant of Cadets: Charlie E. Coulter III
- Teaching staff: 37
- Grades: 7–12 & 1 year postgraduate program
- Gender: male
- Enrollment: 269
- Campus: Rural
- Campus size: 1,000 acres (400 ha)
- Colors: Blue & red
- Mascot: Blue Devils
- Accreditation: Virginia Association of Independent Schools
- Newspaper: Front & Center
- Yearbook: The Skirmisher
- Affiliation: AMCSUS; NAIS; BGAV; VAIS
- Website: forkunion.com

Fork Union Military Academy (abbreviated as FUMA) is a private, all-male, college preparatory Christian military boarding school located in Fork Union, Virginia. It was founded in 1898, making it the second-oldest military high school in Virginia.

Fork Union is a member of the Association of Military Colleges and Schools of the United States and the National Association of Independent Schools and is affiliated with the Baptist General Association of Virginia. FUMA's curriculum extends from the 7th to 12th grade and hosts a one-year postgraduate program.

== History ==
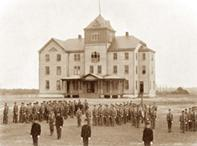
The old Fork Union Military Academy's barracks in 1899.

Located on a 1,000-acre (400 ha) campus in the rolling hills of central Virginia's Piedmont region, Fork Union Military Academy was initially founded as Fork Union Academy in October 1898 by Dr. William E. Hatcher, a prominent local Baptist minister. The first class had nineteen students.

In 1902, the academy took on a military structure to provide organization, discipline, and physical development for the boys of a rapidly growing school. In 1913, the academy became an all-male institution and changed its name to Fork Union Military Academy. That same year, the academy began receiving support from the Baptist General Association of Virginia, which continues to this day.

Military organization is used to structure the daily routine. While the academy has no direct relationship with any military branch, the school's military system has existed for more than 100 years.

Some of its buildings are named after benefactors who have helped fund their construction, such as the Guy E. Beatty Library, the Estes Dining Center, and Jacobson Hall. Other buildings on campus are named in honor or memory of persons who are significant in the school's history, such as Hatcher Hall and the Wicker Science Center, both named in memory of past school presidents.

FUMA's crest shows a pair of crossed swords, a book, and a star, each representing an aspect of the school motto: body, mind, and spirit.

=== Presidents of Fork Union Military Academy ===
- Dr. William E. Hatcher: 1898–1912
- Dr. Eldridge B. Hatcher: 1912–1914
- Col Clayton E. Crosland: 1914–1917
- Col Nathaniel J. Perkins: 1917–1930
- Dr. John J. Wicker: 1930–1945
- Col James C. Wicker: 1945–1968
- Col Kenneth T. Whitescarver, USMC (Ret.): 1968–1990
- COL Charles T. Clanton, USA (Ret.): 1991–1993
- Lt Gen John E. Jackson Jr., USAF (Ret.): 1994–2011
- RADM J. Scott Burhoe, USCG (Ret.): 2011–2018
- Col David L. Coggins, USMC (Ret.): 2018–2023
- Capt Mark E. Black, USN (Ret.): 2023–2026
- Col. Steve Macek (Acting President) 2026-Present

== Academics ==
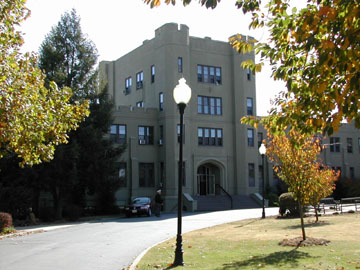
Hatcher Hall.

The school offers a variety of sports, clubs, and organizations for cadet participation during free time in the week and on weekends. Athletics and clubs are a popular diversion from the rigors of cadet life at Fork Union.

Both Standard and Advanced High School Diplomas are offered. Graduating classes have routinely been awarded millions of dollars in scholarships.

One Subject Plan
Fork Union follows a unique curriculum schedule in the upper school (grades 9–12 and postgraduate) known as the One Subject Plan. The school year at Fork Union is divided into five grading periods of about seven weeks in length. Cadets at Fork Union take one subject at a time per each 7-week grading period instead of a conventional schedule with six to eight classes per day throughout the full school year or a block schedule. The cadets remain with the teacher of that course all day, every day during that 7-week grading period.

== Military structure ==
Fork Union Military Academy provides a structured military environment for its cadets. Military aspects of Fork Union's system include the wearing of uniforms, a military-style organization of personnel, accountability for personal appearance and the state of one's room, ranks, and a chain of command. The rank structure adopted by the corps of cadets mirrors the US Army's enlisted ranks, with the exclusion of the ranks of PV2 and Specialist. Its officer ranks mirror those of the Army JROTC's rank structure, with the rank of Cadet Colonel rarely being used.

The Upper School consists of cadets from 9th grade through the Postgraduate year. The Upper School cadets reside in Jacobson Hall, home to Alpha, Bravo, Charlie, Delta, and Echo Companies. There is also a drill team company, Retan Rifle (which exists for special events only) that performs in parades across Virginia. Upper School marching band members march in parades on campus and around the state along with Retan Rifles and Fork Union's Bagpipe Corps. Cadet Officers and Non-Commissioned Officers (NCOs) live as a part of each company. Each company is subdivided into three platoons, each with its own NCOs and Officers. Platoons are subdivided into Squads led by Cadet Sergeants. Squad and Platoon leaders are accountable to the higher company leadership and adult members of the Commandant's Department, as well as to their Tactical Officers (TACs), who are assigned to each company to supervise the cadets.

== Spiritual life ==
While students of other religious beliefs may attend the Academy, all cadets attend on-campus Christian chapel services Monday through Thursday and on Sunday each week unless excused. The Academy is affiliated with the Baptist General Association of Virginia.

== Campus ==
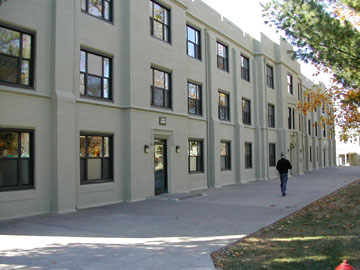
Snead Hall, demolished in 2012 with the opening of Jacobson Hall.

FUMA's campus is located on a 1,000-acre (400 ha) campus in the hills of the Virginia's Piedmont region.

- Hatcher Hall – Administrative offices and liberal arts classrooms
- Wicker Science Building and Moretz Learning Center – Math and Science classrooms
- Vaughan Hall – Social Center / Student Activities
- Wicker Chapel
- Veterans Memorial
- Guy E. Beatty Library
- Dorothy Estes Dining Hall
- Thomas Gymnasium
- Estes Athletic Complex - an 85,000-square-foot (7,900 m^{2}) athletic center
- Fork Union Aquatic Center
- Jacobson Hall – The 90,000-square-foot (8,400 m^{2}), 250-room barracks opened for cadets on August 20, 2012, and now houses Alpha, Bravo, Charlie, Echo, and Delta companies, replacing both Snead and Memorial Halls at a cost of approximately $20 million. Ground was broken on October 22, 2010.

== Athletics ==
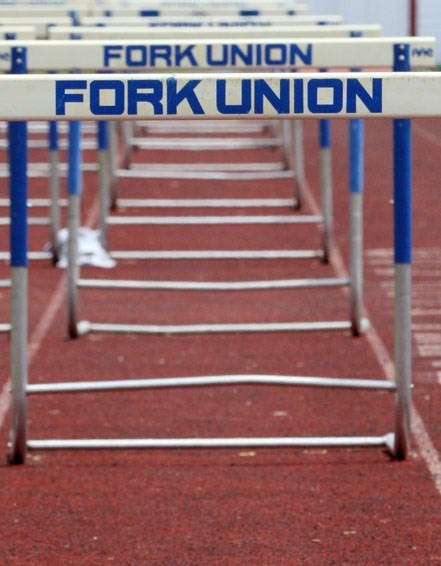
Fork Union's track & field program is one of the dominant teams in Virginia.

FUMA's athletic program is most famous for its football team, which has produced 117 NFL players, and for its track & field team, ranked as one of the best in Virginia.

There are only two postgraduate athletic programs at Fork Union. Head coach Frank Arritt leads the postgraduate football team. The postgraduate basketball program was coached by Fletcher Arritt, the subject of a documentary titled The Passing Game.

The Prep teams fielding players from grades 9–12 include Football, Basketball, Baseball, Lacrosse, Wrestling, Soccer, Cross Country, Track and Field, Orienteering, Shooting Sports, and Swimming and Diving.

The Fork Union Outdoor Track team won its 20th straight VISAA state championship in 2008.

Many athletes have gone on from the academy to compete in collegiate athletic programs and pursue careers on professional teams. FUMA alumni have included numerous famous athletes who have played in the NFL, MLB, and in multiple other leagues and sports.

Their rival Hargrave Military Academy discontinued their postgraduate football team in 2013; the rivalry continues in postgraduate basketball as the two teams continue to compete every season.

== Student organizations ==
There are many different clubs and organizations that cadets can participate in while attending Fork Union. Though new clubs are often started annually by new cadets to meet demand, the more permanent list of clubs includes: National Honor Society, Honor Council, International Club, Fellowship of Christian Athletes, Young Life, IDEA Club, Scuba, Math Club, Speech and Debate, Robotics, Drama Club, Catholic Cadet Association, Chess Club, Band, Pep Band, Bagpipe Corps, Choir, and Woodworking.

== Notable alumni ==
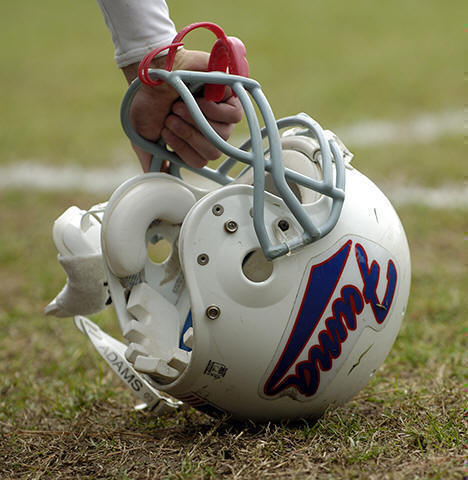
FUMA alumni include over 117 players in the National Football League (NFL).

Notable alumni of Fork Union include:

=== Politics ===
- Ike Franklin Andrews – U.S. Congressman from North Carolina
- Lee Atwater – Republican political consultant and strategist
- Bo Gritz – Army Special Forces officer, Vietnam War POW/MIA activist and third-party presidential candidate in 1992
- Tim Holden – U.S. Congressman from Pennsylvania
- Harold Roe Bartle – Kansas City mayor and namesake of the Kansas City Chiefs and second national president of Alpha Phi Omega.
- Robert Bloxom – Secretary of Agriculture and Forestry for the Commonwealth of Virginia
- Stanley C. Walker – President pro tempore of the Senate of Virginia

=== Military ===
- Fletcher C. Booker Jr. – US Army major general
- John T. Chain Jr. – Retired U.S. Air Force General, Commander in Chief of Strategic Air Command
- Herbert L. Earnest – U.S. Army major general
- Earle Davis Gregory – First Virginian to receive the Medal of Honor and called the "Sergeant York" of Virginia
- George D. Miller – Retired U.S. Air Force Lieutenant General, Vice Commander in Chief of Strategic Air Command. Following retirement, he was the secretary-general of the United States Olympic Committee
- Robert H. Scales – Retired U.S. Army Major General, Commandant of the U.S. Army War College

=== Businessmen ===
- Jeff Jones – CEO and President of H&R Block, executive with Target Corporation, Uber, and Gap Inc.
- Kevin Plank – CEO and Founder of Under Armour
- Jerry Richardson – Founder of the Carolina Panthers
- Ryan Wood, co-founder of the Under Armour company

=== Education ===
- Edward H. Jennings – President of Ohio State University from 1981 to 1990
- Aubrey H. Camden (Class of 1907)– President of Hargrave Military Academy from 1918 to 1951
- Joseph Hathaway Cosby (Class of 1921)– President of Hargrave Military Academy from 1951 to 1970

=== Literature, television and arts ===
- Billy Campbell, actor
- Lloyd Dobyns, NBC reporter and correspondent
- David Huddleston, actor
- Solomon Hughes, actor

=== Track and Field ===
- Ibrahim Mohamed Aden, runner
- Braxton Davenport, Pole Vault, National High School Record, 1990

=== Swimming ===
- Ali Khalafalla, 2016, 2020 Olympics Egypt

=== Basketball ===
- Kevin Laue – First Division I basketball player with one hand; played on a scholarship for Manhattan College
- Dan Ruland – Professional basketball player
- Donald Sims – Professional basketball player
- Khyri Thomas (born 1996) - Drafted 38th overall in the 2018 NBA draft, currently with Maccabi Tel Aviv of the Israeli Basketball Premier League and the EuroLeague.
- Melvin Turpin (1960-2010) – 1st round pick (6th overall) 1984 NBA draft. Center.
- Kenny Williams (born 1969) - basketball player
- Shammond Williams – Drafted 34th overall in the 1998 NBA draft and played nearly a decade in the NBA. On several Top 10 stats lists as a college player at UNC.
- Mike Young – Head men's basketball coach at Virginia Tech

=== National Football League ===
At least 118 Fork Union Military Academy players have been drafted or signed by NFL teams. At least 12 players from Fork Union Military Academy have been selected in the First Round of the NFL draft since 1954, 7 players have been selected for one or more Pro Bowl appearances, and at least 12 players have been on teams that competed in Super Bowl games.

The list includes:

- Gaines Adams - 1st Round pick in the 2007 NFL draft. Defensive lineman.
- Jerell Adams - 6th round pick in the 2015 NFL draft.
- Danny Aiken - Signed as an undrafted free agent in 2011. Long Snapper. Super Bowl XLIX Champion.
- Antonio Allen - 7th round pick in the 2012 NFL draft. Free Safety.
- Maurice Anderson - Signed as an undrafted free agent in 2000. Defensive Tackle. Super Bowl XXXVI Champion.
- Akeem Auguste - Signed as an undrafted free agent in 2013. Cornerback.
- Michael Badgley - Undrafted free agent. Signed with Indianapolis in 2018. Punter/kicker.
- Michael Barber - Undrafted free agent. He signed with the Seattle Seahawks in 1995. Played five years.
- Isaiah Battle - 5th round pick in the 2015 Supplement NFL Draft.
- Darryl Blackstock - 3rd round pick in the 2005 NFL draft. Linebacker.
- Russell Bodine - 4th round pick in the 2014 NFL draft. Offensive lineman.
- Ken Brown - 4th round pick in the 1995 NFL draft. Linebacker.
- Tom Brown - Signed by the Pittsburgh Steelers in 1942.
- Dorien Bryant - Undrafted free agent by the Pittsburgh Steelers. Wide Receiver.
- Plaxico Burress - 1st round pick in the 2000 NFL draft. Super Bowl XLII Champion. Wide Receiver.
- Clen Capriola - 9th round pick in the 1977 NFL draft. Running Back Detroit Lions.
- Anthony Castonzo - 1st round pick in the 2011 NFL draft. Offensive Tackle.
- Erik Christensen - 7th round pick in the 1955 NFL draft. Defensive End.
- Topper Clemons – 8th round pick in the 1986 NFL draft. Running Back.
- Dexter Coakley - College Football Hall of Fame Inductee in 2011. 3rd round pick in the 1997 NFL draft. Three-time Pro Bowl. Linebacker.
- Jeremy Cox – Undrafted free agent by the Denver Broncos in 2019. Running back.
- Al Crow - 28th round pick in the 1955 NFL draft. Defensive Tackle.
- Christian Darrisaw – 1st round pick in the 2021 NFL draft. Offensive Lineman.
- Jim Davis - Undrafted free agent. Defensive End. He signed with the Jacksonville Jaguars in 2005.
- Josh Davis - Undrafted free agent. Signed by Miami Dolphins in 2005. Wide Receiver.
- Tyrone Davis - 4th round pick in the 1995 NFL draft. Tight End. Super Bowl XXXII.
- Antonio Dingle - 7th round pick in the 1999 NFL draft. Defensive Tackle.
- Ernest Dixon - Undrafted free agent. Signed with New Orleans in 1994. Played six seasons in the NFL. Linebacker.
- John Dorsey - 4th round pick in the 1984 NFL draft. He played five seasons in the NFL. Linebacker.
- Marcus Dowtin - Signed as an undrafted free agent in 2012. Linebacker.
- Tyronne Drakeford - 2nd round pick in the 1994 NFL draft. Super Bowl XXIX Champion. Cornerback.
- Darren Drozdov - Undrafted free agent. Signed with Denver in 1993. Defensive Tackle.
- Jim Druckenmiller - 1st round pick in the 1997 NFL draft. Quarterback.
- Rickey Dudley - 1st round pick in the 1996 NFL draft. Played nine years in the NFL. Tight End. Super Bowl XXXVII Champion.
- Jacoby Ford - 4th round pick in the 2010 NFL draft. Wide Receiver.
- Will Furrer - College Hall of Fame Scholar Athlete. 4th round pick in the 1992 NFL draft. Quarterback.
- Eddie George - Winner of the 1995 Heisman Trophy. College Football Hall of Fame Inductee in 2011. Super Bowl XXXIV. 4x All-Pro running back. 1st round pick of the 1996 NFL draft. Played nine years in the NFL.
- DeMingo Graham - Undrafted free agent. Signed by the San Diego Chargers in 1999. Offensive Lineman. He played for six years.
- Derwin Gray – 7th round pick in the 2019 NFL draft. Offensive lineman.
- Christian Hackenberg - 2nd round pick in the 2016 NFL draft. Quarterback.
- Marques Hagans - Music City Bowl Champion. 5th round pick in the 2006 NFL draft. Wide Receiver.
- Jay Hagood - Undrafted free agent. Signed by the New York Jets. Offensive Tackle.
- Steve Hamilton - 2nd round pick in the 1985 NFL draft. Defensive End.
- Marcus Haynes - Undrafted free agent. Signed by the Denver Broncos in 2023. Linebacker.
- Marquis Haynes - 4th round pick in the 2018 NFL draft. Carolina Panthers. Defensive End.
- John Hilton - 6th round pick in the 1964 NFL draft. Tight End. Played nine years in NFL.
- Mack Hollins - 4th round pick in the 2017 NFL draft. Philadelphia Eagles. Wide Receiver.
- Montori Hughes - 5th round pick in the 2013 NFL draft. Defensive End.
- Carlos Hyde - 2nd round pick in the 2014 NFL draft. Running Back
- James Jackson - 3rd round pick in the 2001 NFL draft. Running Back.
- Kareem Jackson - 1st round pick in the 2010 NFL draft. Cornerback.
- Cardale Jones - 4th round pick in the 2016 NFL draft. Quarterback.
- Robert Jones - 1st round pick in the 1992 NFL draft. 1992 NFC Rookie of the Year. 3x Super Bowl Champion. Linebacker.
- Dave Kadela - Undrafted free agent. Signed by the Atlanta Falcons in 2001. Played five seasons in the NFL.
- Zach Kerr - Cincinnati Bengals 2021–present. Member of the 2021 Bengals Super Bowl LVI team. Signed by Indianapolis Colts in 2014. Nose tackle.
- Jeff Komlo - 9th round pick in the 1979 NFL draft to the Detroit Lions. Quarterback.
- Brian Kozlowski - Undrafted free agent. Signed by the New York Giants in 1993. Played in the Super Bowl XXXIII. Tight End.
- Pat Lamberti – 13th round pick in the 1959 NFL draft to the Chicago Cardinals. Linebacker. Played three years.
- Brandon London - Undrafted free agent. Signed by the New York Giants in 2007. Wide Receiver. Super Bowl XLII Champion.
- Don Majkowski - 10th round pick by the Green Bay Packers in the 1987 NFL draft. Played in 1989 Pro Bowl. Quarterback.
- Jimmy Martin - 7th round pick by the San Diego Chargers in the 2006 NFL draft. Offensive Lineman.
- LeRon McCoy - 7th round pick by the Arizona Cardinals in the 2005 NFL draft. Wide Receiver.
- Billy McMullen - 3rd round pick in the 2003 NFL draft. Wide Receiver.
- Steve Meilinger - College Football Hall of Fame Inductee in 2013. 1st round pick in the 1954 NFL draft. Defensive End.
- Phillip Merling - 2nd round pick in the 2008 NFL draft. Played six seasons. Defensive End.
- Tom Miller - Played four seasons in the NFL (1943–46). A member of the Steagles in '43. Defensive End.
- Josh Morgan - 6th round pick in the 2008 NFL draft. Wide Receiver.
- Morgan Moses - 3rd round pick in the 2014 NFL draft. Offensive Tackle.
- Eric Moss - Undrafted free agent. Signed by the Minnesota Vikings in 1997. Offensive Lineman.
- Red Murdock – Mr. Irrelevant. 7th round pick in the 2026 NFL draft. Linebacker
- Yosh Nijman – Undrafted free agent. Signed by the Green Bay Packers in 2019. Offensive Lineman.
- Don Oakes - 3rd round pick by the Philadelphia Eagles in the 1961 NFL draft. Offensive Tackle. 1967 Pro Bowl.
- Roman Oben - 3rd round pick in the 1996 NFL draft. Super Bowl XXXVII Champion. Offensive Tackle.
- Mark Parson - Signed as an undrafted free agent in 2009. Cornerback.
- Austin Pasztor - 1st round pick in the CFL in 2012. Later signed as an undrafted free agent in the NFL. Offensive Tackle.
- Chris Perry - Finalist (4th in voting) for 2003 Heisman Trophy. 1st round pick in the 2004 NFL draft. Played five seasons. Running back.
- Bobby Phillips - Undrafted free agent. Signed by the Minnesota Vikings in 1995. Running Back.
- Hollin Pierce – Undrafted free agent. Signed by the Philadelphia Eagles in 2025. Offensive Lineman.
- Olsen Pierre - Undrafted free agent. He signed with the Chicago Bears in 2015. Played four seasons with the Arizona Cardinals. Defensive lineman for the New York Giants.
- Caden Prieskorn – Undrafted free agent. Signed by the Detroit Lions in 2025. Tight End.
- Kelcy Quarles - Signed as an undrafted free agent in 2014. Defensive Tackle.
- Mike Quick - 1st round pick in the 1982 NFL draft. 5x Pro Bowl. Wide Receiver.
- Sonny Randle - 4x Pro Bowl. 19th round pick in the 1958 NFL draft. Wide Receiver.
- Derek Rivers - 3rd round pick in the 2017 NFL draft. New England Patriots. Defensive End.
- Tyrone Robertson - 7th round pick in the 2001 NFL draft. Defensive Tackle.
- Jacob Ruby - 1st round pick in the CFL in 2015. Offensive Tackle.
- Mohammed Seisay - Signed as an undrafted free agent in 2014. Cornerback.
- Ashley Sheppard - 4th round pick in the 1993 NFL draft. Played three seasons. Linebacker.
- C.J. Spillman - Signed as an undrafted free agent in 2009. Strong Safety. Played seven seasons.
- Marquis Spruill - Signed as an undrafted free agent in 2014. Inside Linebacker.
- Linden Stephens – Signed as an undrafted free agent in 2018. Cornerback.
- Jon-Eric Sullivan - General Manager for the Miami Dolphins
- Shannon Taylor - Played four seasons in the NFL from 2000–03.
- Vinny Testaverde - College Football Hall of Fame Inductee in 2013. Winner of the 1986 Heisman Trophy. First overall pick in the 1st round of the 1987 NFL draft. 2x Pro Bowl. 21 seasons in the NFL.
- Art Thomas - Undrafted free agent. Signed by the New York Jets in 2004. Cornerback. Played four seasons.
- Michael Thomas - 2nd round pick in the 2016 NFL draft. Wide Receiver.
- Stacy Tutt - Undrafted free agent. He signed with the New York Jets in 2006. Full Back.
- Lowell Vaught, KC Chiefs, 1963
- Juice Wells – Undrafted free agent. Signed by the New York Giants in 2025. Wide Receiver.
- Terrance West - 3rd round pick in the 2014 NFL draft. Running Back.
- Ernest Wilford - 4th round pick in the 2004 NFL draft. Wide Receiver.
- Joe Williams - 4th round pick in the 2017 NFL draft. Running Back. San Francisco 49ers.
- Lee Williamson - Undrafted free agent. Signed by the Houston Oilers in 1993. Quarterback. Played four seasons.
- Jamaine Winborne - Played four seasons in the NFL. Cornerback.
- Ryan Wood - 7th round pick in the 1996 NFL draft. Co-Founder of Under Armour with FUMA teammate Kevin Plank.

== Notable faculty ==
- Samuel G. Fuqua – Retired U.S. Navy Rear Admiral. He was the highest-ranking officer to survive the sinking of USS Arizona on December 7, 1941. For his actions, he was awarded the Medal of Honor. He was a mathematics instructor at Fork Union in the late 1950's.
