= Keith Gary =

American football player (born 1959)

No. 75, 92
- Position: Defensive end

Personal information
- Born: September 14, 1959 (age 67); Bethesda, Maryland, U.S.
- Listed height: 6 ft 3 in (1.91 m)
- Listed weight: 263 lb (119 kg)

Career information
- High school: Chantilly (Fairfax County, Virginia)
- College: Ferrum; Oklahoma
- NFL draft: 1981: 1st round, 17th overall pick

Career history
- Montreal Alouettes/Concordes (1981–1982); Pittsburgh Steelers (1983–1988)

Awards and highlights
- Second-team All-Big Eight (1980)

Career NFL statistics
- Sacks: 25
- Fumble recoveries: 4
- Stats at Pro Football Reference

Keith Jerrold Gary (born September 14, 1959) is an American former professional football player who was a defensive end in the National Football League (NFL). Gary was selected in the first round, 17th overall, by the Pittsburgh Steelers out of the University of Oklahoma in the 1981 NFL draft, but didn't sign and went to play two seasons with the Montreal Alouettes and Montreal Concordes of the Canadian Football League (CFL). He then played six seasons with the Steelers. Before his time at the University of Oklahoma, Gary played college football at Ferrum College.

He is perhaps best known for committing one of the most infamous facemask penalties in NFL history. During a Week 6 game against the Cincinnati Bengals in 1983, Gary grabbed quarterback Ken Anderson, ripping at his facemask and knocking Anderson out of the game with a severe neck sprain early in the first quarter. Gary was penalized on the play, but not ejected, and later fined by the NFL for the facemask penalty that left Anderson, who would miss the Bengals next three games, without feeling below the neck. Anderson had completed all five of his passes for 60 yards before being knocked out of the game. Later in the same game he was penalized for a late hit on Bengals back up quarterback Turk Schonert.

According to reporting in The Oklahoman, Cincinnati Bengals General Manager, Paul Brown, who until 1983 had worked in high school, college, and professional football for 53 years, described Gary's facemask penalty to be "as vicious a play as he had ever seen."

== Personal life ==
Gary was born in Bethesda, Maryland, and attended Chantilly High School in Chantilly, Virginia.
