= Ryan Wood =

American football player (born 1972)

Profile
- Position: Fullback

Personal information
- Born: June 13, 1972 (age 54); Fort Collins, Colorado, U.S.
- Listed height: 5 ft 11 in (1.80 m)
- Listed weight: 236 lb (107 kg)

Career information
- High school: Loveland (CO)
- College: Arizona State
- NFL draft: 1996: 7th round, 243rd overall pick

Career history
- Dallas Cowboys (1996)*
- * Offseason or practice squad member only

Ryan Wood (born June 13, 1972) is co-founder of Under Armour, a manufacturer of sportswear, footwear and accessories based in Baltimore, Maryland. He also is an American former football fullback. He played college football at the Arizona State University.

== Early life ==
Wood attended Loveland High School. In 1990, he spent one year at Fork Union Military Academy.

He accepted a football scholarship from Youngstown State University. As a freshman, he had 11 carries for 47 yards and one touchdown, while being a part of the team that won the Division I-AA national championship. As a sophomore, he posted 59 carries for 212 yards, helping the team to finish in second place.

He transferred after his sophomore season to Arizona State University. He sat out the 1993 season to comply with the NCAA transfer rules.

As a junior in 1994, he appeared in the first 7 games before suffering a season-ending ankle injury against Washington State University. He scored his first touchdown with the Sun Devils against the University of Louisville. He scored a touchdown in a 36-35 win over Stanford University.

As a senior, he started 6 games at fullback, registering 35 carries for 110 yards, 2 touchdowns and 51 knockdown blocks. He scored a touchdown and had a key block that helped Terry Battle run for a 58-yard touchdown, in a 38-29 win over the University of California, Berkeley. He also scored touchdown in a 29-21 win over Brigham Young University.

== Professional career ==
Wood was selected by the Dallas Cowboys in the seventh round (243rd overall) of the 1996 NFL draft. He was waived before the start of the season on August 19.

== Personal life ==
Wood had met Kevin Plank while attending Fork Union Military Academy, and the two of them along with Kip Fulks co-founded the apparel company Under Armour. Wood eventually decided to leave Under Armour after 10 years of being in charge of the company's sales and marketing efforts. He moved back to his hometown of Steamboat Springs, Colorado, to open a cattle ranch called Sweetwood that sells steaks and beef jerky.
