= Al Crow =

American football player (1932–2019)

No. 72
- Position: Defensive tackle

Personal information
- Born: August 20, 1932; Norfolk, Virginia, U.S.
- Died: September 12, 2019 (aged 87); Manassas, Virginia, U.S.
- Listed height: 6 ft 7 in (2.01 m)
- Listed weight: 260 lb (118 kg)

Career information
- High school: Norfolk; Fork Union Military Academy (VA)
- College: William & Mary (1951–1952, 1957–1958)
- NFL draft: 1955: 28th round, 332nd overall pick

Career history
- Boston Patriots (1960)

Career AFL statistics
- Games played: 3
- Stats at Pro Football Reference

Albert Lee Crow (August 20, 1932 – September 12, 2019) was an American professional football player for the American Football League (AFL)'s Boston Patriots. He played in three games in the 1960 season after his collegiate career at William & Mary.
