= Warren Training School =

- Chatham, Virginia; United States

Information
- Type: Private
- Established: 1906
- Founder: Charles R. Warren
- Status: Closed
- Closed: 1909
- Headmaster: Charles R. Warren
- Gender: Boys
- Enrollment: 20 (approximate average)
- Campus: Rural

The Warren Training School was a boys-only day school in Chatham, Virginia founded in 1906 by Charles R. Warren. It closed in 1909, after operating for three years.

== History ==
The Warren Training School was founded by its namesake and first and only headmaster, Charles R. Warren, in 1906. It averaged an enrollment of approximately twenty students. There was considerable need at the time for schools in and around Chatham, and WTS was founded in direct response to that. WTS closed due to insufficient funds after the third session in May 1909.

A section of page 1 of Colonel Aubrey H. Camden's "Fifty Years of Christian Education in a Baptist School: A Historical Record of Hargrave Military Academy" reads:

"In 1906, a young graduate of Trinity College, Durham, North Carolina, Mr. Charles R. Warren, learned of the dire educational needs in the vicinity of Chatham. He came to Chatham, accepted the Challenge, organized and operated a day school in which he had about twenty boys. The Simms' house, presently located at the extreme end of Merchant Street, was used as a school building. It became known as Warren Training School. At the close of the third session in May, 1909, it was announced that insufficient funds would not permit the school to reopen in September."

== Legacy ==
Though it was short-lived, Warren Training School served as an inspiration to Jesse Hunt Hargrave, his son John Hunt Hargrave, and Reverend T. Ryland Sanford. These three men joined with Charles R. Warren and together went on to found the Chatham Training School in 1909, which is better known by the name it adopted in 1925: Hargrave Military Academy.
