= Next Step Realty: NYC =

2015 American TV series

- Genre: Reality television
- Starring: Matt Bauman; Blair Brandt; Anna Cogswell; Brianna Coughlan; David G. Ghysels III; Edward “Field” Hucks; Michaela Lalanne; Victoria Scott; Margit Weinberg; Erin Wilson; Danielle Rossen; Michael Driscoll
- Country of origin: United States
- Original language: English
- No. of seasons: 1
- No. of episodes: 10

Production
- Executive producers: Danielle Rossen; Michael Driscoll
- Production company: Lincoln Square Productions

Original release
- Network: Freeform
- Release: August 11 – October 15, 2015

Next Step Realty: NYC is an American reality television series that aired on ABC Family from August 11, 2015 to October 15, 2015. It was about the company, The Next Step Realty, which helps people find apartments in New York City with an exclusive tour using chauffeured limousines to transport clients.

== Cast ==
- Matt Bauman, Managing Broker
- Blair Brandt, Co-founder & CEO
- Anna Cogswell, Director of client hospitality
- Brianna Coughlan, Licensed real estate agent
- David G. Ghysels III, Licensed real estate salesperson
- Edward “Field” Hucks, Senior vice president
- Michaela Lalanne, Client relations associate
- Victoria Scott, Licensed real estate salesperson
- Margit Weinberg
- Erin Wilson, Director of client relations
- Danielle Rossen, Executive producer
- Michael Driscoll, Co-executive producer

== Episodes ==
No.	Title	Original release date	US viewers (millions)
1	"Checks and Balances"	August 11, 2015	0.52
2	"The Blacklist"	August 18, 2015	0.20
3	"Reality Check"	August 25, 2015	0.10
4	"Ournextstep"	September 1, 2015	0.17
5	"Field Trip"	September 8, 2015	0.15
6	"All's Fair in Love and Real Estate"	September 15, 2015	0.16
7	"Broker Code"	September 22, 2015	0.11
8	"Fondue or Die"	October 1, 2015	0.09
9	"Girls Night Gone Bad"	October 8, 2015	0.14
10	"All Eyes on the Prize"	October 15, 2015	0.11

== Broadcast ==
Internationally, the series premiered in Australia on Arena on February 2, 2016.
