= Joseph Hathaway Cosby =

- Born: June 2, 1902; Hampton, Virginia
- Died: October 11, 1998 (aged 96); Newport News, Virginia
- Military career
- Allegiance: United States of America
- Branch: United States Army
- Service years: 1942-1946
- Rank: Major
- Conflicts: World War II
- Awards: World War II Victory Medal

Joseph Hathaway Cosby (June 2, 1902 – October 11, 1998) was an American pastor, US Army chaplain, and the third President of Hargrave Military Academy.

== Biography ==
Joseph Hathaway Cosby was born on June 2, 1902, in Hampton, Virginia, to Joseph Hugh and Harriet Hathaway Cosby. After attending a variety of public schools, he entered Fork Union Military Academy, from which he graduated in 1921. Cosby then attended the University of Richmond, the University of Virginia, and the Southern Baptist Theological Seminary, receiving a degree from each college.

On September 17, 1924, Cosby married Helen Frances Eubank of Newport News, Virginia. They had one daughter, Jane Cosby.

Joseph Cosby was a pastor in Lexington, Virginia, when the United States entered World War II. He joined the US Army Chaplain Corps in October 1942 and served until January 1946. Twenty-one months of Cosby's service were spent in the European Theater of Operations. Cosby received six battle stars and achieved the rank of major.

After his return to the United States, Cosby served as a pastor in Richmond and Lexington, Virginia. He succeeded Colonel Aubrey H. Camden as President of Hargrave Military Academy in Chatham, Virginia, on July 28, 1951. Cosby became known as Colonel Cosby during this time, since the President is by tradition an honorary colonel if he hasn't achieved that rank or higher in military service. Cosby retired as President at the end of the 1969-1970 year, with then-Dean Vernon T. Lankford being his successor.

In 1984, Cosby published a book on Hargrave Military Academy, From Ashes To Excellence, 1950–1970. The book draws its title from the fire of 1950 and the subsequent rebuilding of the academy. Four thousand copies were printed, costing Hargrave approximately $12,000.

Cosby died in Newport News on October 11, 1998, at the age of 96. His wife had predeceased him after 62 years of marriage. Colonel John W. Ripley and an honor guard of nine Hargrave cadets were among those present at his funeral.

== Legacy ==
Colonel Cosby is well-remembered at Hargrave, where he was President for nineteen years. One of the most important buildings on campus, the Joseph H. Cosby Humanities and Sciences building, is named in his honor.

== Education ==
- 1921 High School Diploma, Fork Union Military Academy, Fork Union, Virginia
- 1929 Bachelor of Arts degree, University of Richmond, Richmond, Virginia
- Bachelor of Theology degree, Southern Baptist Theological Seminary, Louisville, Kentucky
- Master of Arts degree, University of Virginia, Charlottesville, Virginia
- Doctor of Laws degree, University of Richmond, Richmond, Virginia
