= Bite Me Cancer Foundation =

American nonprofit organization

The Bite Me Cancer Foundation is a nonprofit 501(c) organization, founded in Fairfax County, Virginia, in September 2010 by Nikki Ferraro and her parents, Sharon Ferraro and C. Michael Ferraro. Bite Me Cancer was founded with the goal to support teenagers with all types of cancer, in addition to providing direct funding to research and improve awareness and advocacy for thyroid cancer. Bite Me Cancer partners with the American Thyroid Association and Thyroid Cancer Survivors Association to raise awareness and fund grants across the world. Bite Me Cancer seeks to both support teenagers with all types of cancer and directly fund for thyroid cancer research. In early 2026, the foundation announced that they are going to close in 2027.

== History ==
At the age of 17, Nikki Ferraro was diagnosed with sporadic medullary thyroid cancer, a rare form of thyroid carcinoma, in April 2010 as a junior at Chantilly High School, Chantilly, Virginia. Immediately following her diagnosis, she organized a Relay for Life team in support of her diagnosis, and two months later finished as the #1 individual fundraiser in South Atlantic Region of the American Cancer Society after raising over US$20,000. Ferraro was driven to take the support she received from the Relay experience and turn it into a widespread campaign to help others dealing with cancer. Three months later, in September 2010, Bite Me Cancer was incorporated into a foundation.

Two months after the formation of Bite Me Cancer, Nicole Ferraro received the 2010 Leadership Fairfax Non-Profit Educational Leadership Award. The following year, she received the first-ever Perlita Liwanag Scholarship from the Ulman Cancer Fund for Young Adults at Chantilly High School. Bite Me Cancer focuses on supporting teens undergoing cancer treatment, in addition to supporting the progression of thyroid cancer research and treatment development.

Bite Me Cancer developed its Teen Support Bag, handing out the first one in 2012. It is important that the items are chosen specifically for teenage cancer patients. Teenagers dealing with cancer often fall through the cracks between the younger pediatric patients and adult patients.

When Ferraro was diagnosed, thyroid cancer was the fastest increasing cancer in the US with very few treatment options. In her case, surgery was the only available treatment. Directly funding research grants became a high priority for Bite Me Cancer.

== Teen Cancer Awareness Week ==
On July 31, 2014, Virginia Governor Terry McAuliffe declared the third week of January, starting in 2015, Teen Cancer Awareness Week in the Commonwealth of Virginia, following the work of Ferraro and the Bite Me Cancer Foundation. McAuliffe stated in his declaration that "the health and safety of all Virginians is essential to the happiness and well-being of the Commonwealth’s families and communities, whereas cancer is the leading cause of death in the adolescent population, and whereas the survival rates for adolescent cancer have not improved in the last thirty years." The Fairfax County Board of Supervisors provided a proclamation for Teen Cancer Awareness Week in January 2015, and Bite Me Cancer officially announced on January 4, 2015, that the awareness week would begin the same year. McAuliffe also pointed out that many teenagers with cancer are "isolated from their friends and family," and noted the importance of "vigorously" supporting them as they return to everyday social and academic settings. Bite Me Cancer continues to raise awareness in schools and homes with this annual event.

== Thyroid cancer ==
Ferraro explains that many people refer to thyroid cancer as the "good cancer" due to the perception that there is not a high rate of mortality, its history of being diagnosed in a smaller group of people, and that losing the thyroid is not a difficult situation. However, thyroid cancer is dangerous and can be aggressive. Medullary thyroid cancer is rare, accounting for 3–4% of all thyroid cancer diagnoses. As of 2014 medullary thyroid cancer is incurable; those diagnosed with this form of thyroid carcinoma will probably suffer from it for the rest of their lives. Very few drugs have been approved for medullary thyroid cancer treatment.

== Research ==
Bite Me Cancer has funded twelve research grants for thyroid cancer as of late 2026. The first grant, of $57,500, was awarded in 2014 to Ramona Dadu, MD at the MD Anderson Cancer Center in Houston, Texas. Many grants have been given since, and all the researchers and overviews of their research is displayed on the Bite Me Cancer website.

== Fundraising ==
Bite Me Cancer organizes annual events, including an annual wine dinner (2014–present) every year to honor and celebrate with cancer survivors including Nikki Ferraro, who was diagnosed in April 2010. The focus on onsite donations during the dinner is to support our Teen Support Bag program. There are currently few programs in place to support teenagers with cancer, but there are thousands of programs to support young children and adults. Teenagers with cancers often require specific treatment and support, and there is very little awareness of the struggles that teenagers with cancer face. By developing and shipping the Teen Support Bags to hospitals around the country for their teenaged cancer sufferers, and holding events to raise awareness, Bite Me Cancer is participating in a movement to increase support and make more resources available to these teenagers. The Final Toast wine dinner took place on October 23, 2026.

== Teen Support Programs ==
As of October 2026, Bite Me Cancer has passed out 15,200 Teen Support Bags across the country to teenagers with cancer through a growing network of hospitals that enable teenagers in every state and DC to receive the bags. Currently, about 210 hospitals are part of the network. The foundation coordinates the stuffing and distribution of the Teen Support Bags every year with groups of volunteers. Each bag includes items to eliminate stress, inspire and support teenagers currently undergoing cancer treatment. Nikki Ferraro's goal with this bag program was to offer inspiration, support and encouragement during their treatments.

Throughout a number of years, Bite Me Cancer has also provided monthly meals to families on the pediatric oncology floor of the Inova Childrens Hospital in Fairfax, VA. Over the years, the foundation has also provided free, fun events for teens with cancer and their families and friends which included locations such as Dave & Buster's in Fairfax, VA, and also Washington Nationals baseball games in a donated suite as well as Washington Capitals games in a donated suite.
