= John J. Wicker Jr. =

American lawyer and politician (1893–1985)

Member of the Virginia Senate from the 36th district
- In office January 13, 1932 – January 8, 1936
- Preceded by: Waller Holladay
- Succeeded by: Gordon B. Ambler

Personal details
- Born: John Jordan Wicker Jr. December 31, 1893 Lyndon, Kentucky, U.S.
- Died: July 20, 1985 (aged 91) Richmond, Virginia, U.S.
- Resting place: Hollywood Cemetery
- Party: Democratic
- Spouses: Kate Richardson (died 1955); Ruby Summers (m. 1961)
- Education: Furman University (BA); Richmond College (LLB)
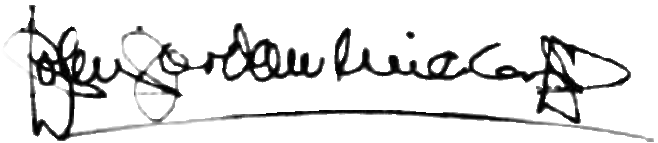
- Signature

Military service
- Branch/service: United States Army; Army Air Service
- Years of service: 1917–1919
- Battles/wars: World War I
- Awards: Officer, Legion of Honour; Chevalier, Order of Leopold

John Jordan Wicker Jr. (December 31, 1893 – July 20, 1985) was an American lawyer and Democratic politician who served as a member of the Virginia Senate from 1932 to 1936, representing the City of Richmond.

== Life & Career ==
Born in Lyndon, Kentucky, to Elizabeth Pumphrey and John Jordan Wicker, Sr., Wicker attended Furman University in South Carolina, and subsequently the Richmond College School of Law, graduating from the latter in 1914.

With the United States' eventual entry into World War I, Wicker joined the U.S. Army Air Service in 1917, serving until 1919. A founding member of the American Legion, he was elected the chairman of Virginia's 1945 Constitutional Convention which aimed to expand voting rights to members of the armed forces during wartime.

Wicker served as the 5th president of Fork Union Military Academy from 1930 to 1945.

== Personal life ==
Wicker married Kate Lumpkin Richardson in 1914, remaining with her until Kate's death in 1955. Wicker subsequently married Ruby Summers in 1961. He had one daughter, Katherine. He was buried in Hollywood Cemetery.

Senate of Virginia
Preceded by Waller Holladay	Virginia Senator for the 36th District; 1932–1936	Succeeded by
