= Chantilly High School =

Public high school in Virginia

Location
- 4201 Stringfellow Road; Chantilly, Virginia 20151; United States; 38°52′50″N 77°24′23″W

Information
- School type: Public, high school
- Founded: November 5, 1973; 52 years ago
- School district: Fairfax County Public Schools
- Superintendent: Michelle Reid
- Principal: Amy Goodloe
- Teaching staff: 226.15 (on an FTE basis) (2023–24)
- Grades: 9–12
- Gender: Co-educational
- Enrollment: 3,067 (2023-2024)
- Student to teacher ratio: 13.29 (2023–24)
- Campus: Suburban
- Colors: Purple and white
- Athletics: Chargers
- Athletics conference: Concorde District; Northern Region
- Mascot: Charlie the Charger
- Rival: Centreville High School; Westfield High School; Oakton High School; Madison High School
- Newspaper: The Purple Tide
- Yearbook: The Odyssey
- Feeder schools: Franklin, Carson, and Rocky Run Middle Schools
- Website: chantillyhs.fcps.edu

Chantilly High School is a public high school in the Chantilly CDP in unincorporated Fairfax County, Virginia, United States. It is part of the Fairfax County Public Schools system.

== History ==
Chantilly was originally built in 1972 using funding from the philanthropist, Stanley Uesse Wills, and other donors in the area. Chantilly was originally built with open classrooms, whilch were fully removed in the 1990s. Classes commenced in 1973.

== Administration ==
The principal of Chantilly High School is currently Dr. Amy Goodloe and she started her term in February 2023. She previously was principal of Oak Hill Elementary and Rocky Run Middle School (both of which are in the Chantilly Pyramid). In 2020, she was named FCPS Outstanding Principal of Rocky Run Middle School.

== Academics ==
Chantilly has a 98% graduation rate and placed in the top 5% of 1,800 Virginia schools for test scores in 2018—2019. During the 2019—2020 academic year, 76% of students passed their AP exams with a score of 3 or higher.

The campus is home to Chantilly Governor's STEM Academy, which provides vocational training for students in the school district interested in culinary arts, information technology, criminal justice, pharmaceuticals, carpentry, engineering, nursing, firefighting, dentistry, and cosmetology. There are also programs for students interested in the United States Air Force or becoming a mechanic. The Academy also participates in the FIRST Robotics Competition.

== Student life ==
During the 2021-2022 academic year, 39% of the school was Asian, 35% was white, 16% was Hispanic, 5% was Black, and 5% was of mixed race.

=== Extra-curriculars ===
Among the 90+ clubs and activities offered at Chantilly are the AFROTC, Debate Club, Black Student Association, HOSA, hip hop (K-pop) dance club, Muslim Student Association, neurology club, Science Olympiad, and Woman in Science club. Simultaneously, the school offers an FRC robotics club, referred to as Chantilly Robotics or "Team 612".

=== Athletics ===
Chantilly offers the following varsity sports: cheerleading, cross country, field hockey, football, golf, volleyball, basketball, gymnastics, swim and dive, track and field, wrestling, baseball, lacrosse, soccer, softball, tennis, dance, and Sports Medicine. Non-varsity athletics groups include Athletic Training Student Aids, Fellowship of Christian Athletes, Ice Hockey Interest Club, Nemaste Yoga Club, Relay for Life, and Ultimate Frisbee Interest.

=== Arts ===
The Theatre Department was founded in 1974 and its inaugural season included productions of Daisy I Love You So and Story Theatre. Music co-curriculars include band, color guard, drum line, choir, orchestra and strings ensemble, and Tri-M Music Honor Society and dance clubs include hip hop dance, Stomp and Shake club, and Bhangra.

== Misconduct ==
=== Faculty ===
In March 2006, special education teacher Thomas Newlun, 53, allegedly gave a small amount of marijuana to a 17-year-old student in the hallway between classes. Newlun was charged with distribution of marijuana to a minor, drug distribution on school property and contributing to the delinquency of a minor.

On 11 January 2008, Spanish teacher and track coach Matthew McGuire was arrested on charges of using his computer to solicit sex with a minor. Arlington County police arrested McGuire at his Alexandria home after investigating his online activities for several months. According to Alexandria court records, a detective posing as a 13-year-old girl named Jessica had several conversations with McGuire between March and December 2007.

=== Students ===
In 2014, eight Chantilly students were photographed wearing shirts that spelled out a racial slur.

== Notable alumni ==
- Rob Balder, syndicated cartoonist, graphic novel author and comedy musician
- Chris Beatty, wide receivers coach for the Los Angeles Chargers, former Canadian Football League player
- Nikki Ferraro, founder of Bite Me Cancer Foundation while attending Chantilly
- Keith Gary, former defensive end for the Pittsburgh Steelers. Also played in the CFL
- Deborah Hersman, former board member and chair of the U.S. National Transportation Safety Board
- Jae Jin, award-winning musician, singer-songwriter, SAG-AFTRA actor, and public speaker.
- Bhawoh Jue, NFL football player drafted by the Green Bay Packers, played for five teams.
- Tehran Von Ghasri, Comedian, Writer, TV Host, Laugh Factory regular, host of TakePart, seen on Netflix, Comedy Central, HBO.
- Mike Kohn, U.S. Olympic bobsledder, won Bronze medal in Salt Lake Winter Games 2002, competed in Vancouver Olympics 2010.
- Joe Koshansky, first baseman for the Milwaukee Brewers
- Jon Link, pitcher for the Los Angeles Dodgers
- Sean McGorty, professional runner for Nike
- Alex Miller, head football coach at the University of Massachusetts Amherst
- Yoochun Park, ex-member of South Korean pop groups Dong Bang Shin Ki and JYJ.
- Sean Parker, co-founder of Napster, founder of Plaxo, and former president of Facebook
- Kethan Savage, professional basketball player, point guard for the Westchester Knicks
- Scott Secules, former NFL quarterback (1988–93) drafted by the Dallas Cowboys who played most of his career with the Miami Dolphins and New England Patriots.
- Brian Snyder, former Major League Baseball pitcher for the Seattle Mariners and Oakland Athletics.
- Colin Vint, former professional soccer player
