= Wheeler L. Baker =

President of Hargrave Military Academy

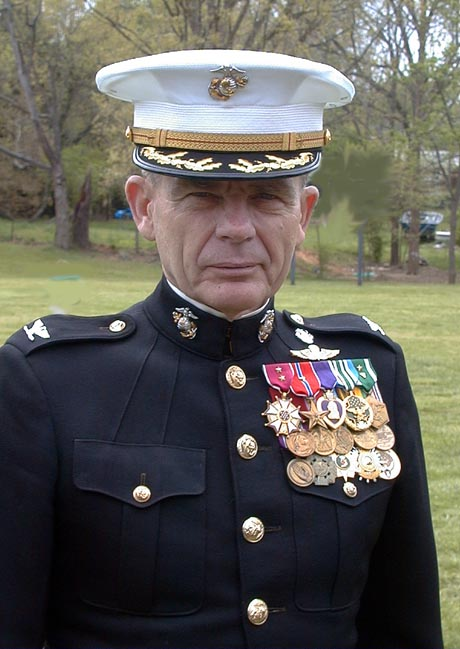
- Born: 1938 (age 87–88)
- Military career
- Allegiance: United States of America
- Branch: United States Marine Corps
- Service years: 1958–1997
- Rank: Colonel
- Commands: 1st Reconnaissance Battalion, 22nd Marine Expeditionary Unit
- Conflicts: Vietnam War, Gulf War
- Awards: Legion of Merit (3)
- Other work: Hargrave Military Academy

Wheeler L. Baker (born 1938) is a retired U.S. Marine who served as the ninth President of Hargrave Military Academy from 1999 to 2011, and again from 2017 to 2018.

== Career ==
Baker enlisted in the United States Marine Corps in 1958, and served as an enlisted Marine for nine years. From 1962 to 1964, he served a tour as a drill instructor. Upon being presented with the opportunity to obtain a commission, Baker accepted and graduated from Officer Candidate School as an honor graduate. From January to July 1973, while a captain, Baker attended Amphibious Warfare School (now called Expeditionary Warfare School), one of a total of 77 recipients of the Purple Heart in the class. A notable classmate of Baker's in that AWS class was John J. McGinty, who had been awarded the Medal of Honor in 1968.

Baker's total of thirty-nine-and-a-half years of service include commanding a Reconnaissance company in Vietnam and the 1st Reconnaissance Battalion from July 6, 1983 to June 25, 1985. He was promoted to colonel in 1989, and in 1990 served in Operation: Desert Storm as commander of the 22nd Marine Expeditionary Unit. In 1993, Baker published his first book, Crisis Management: A Model For Managers. A year later, Baker served as chief of staff of the 1st Marine Division in Somalia.

Wheeler Baker graduated from the University of Tampa with a bachelor's degree in economics in 1972, going on to obtain a Master of Arts in international affairs from the Catholic University of America. He studied at the Naval War College and Salve Regina College and earned a PhD in organizational learning and instructional techniques at the University of New Mexico in 1998.

In his final assignment in the Marine Corps, Baker was chairman of the Naval Science Department at the University of New Mexico. He retired from the U.S. Marine Corps in 1997, and was recruited by Hargrave Military Academy in Chatham, Virginia, that same year.

=== President of Hargrave ===
Baker served as provost until the sitting president of Hargrave, Colonel John W. Ripley, resigned on March 18, 1999. On June 24, 2011, Colonel Baker retired as president of Hargrave, transferring leadership of the school to Brigadier General Doyle Broome Jr., a retired US Army officer and the first flag officer to be president of HMA.

Six years later, on June 2, 2017, Broome's retirement was announced effective May 31, 2017. To ensure Hargrave would not be without vital senior leadership while the search for a new president went on, Baker agreed to return from retirement to serve as Hargrave's interim president. Baker turned leadership of Hargrave over to Colonel Michael Allen Brown, U.S.M.C., in 2018.

== Effective dates of promotion ==
Promotions
Insignia	Rank	Date
	Second lieutenant	
	First lieutenant	
	Captain	
	Major	
	Lieutenant colonel	
	Colonel	1989

== Awards ==
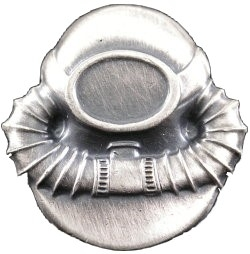

SCUBA Diver Badge
Navy and Marine Corps Parachutist Insignia
1st Row	Legion of Merit with two award stars		Bronze Star Medal with valor device	
2nd Row	Purple Heart	Joint Service Commendation Medal	Navy Commendation Medal with one award star & valor device	Marine Corps Good Conduct Medal
3rd Row	Combat Action Ribbon	National Defense Service Medal with one bronze star	Armed Forces Expeditionary Medal	Vietnam Service Medal with four bronze stars
4th Row	Southwest Asia Service Medal	Humanitarian Service Medal	Sea Service Ribbon with three bronze stars	Marine Corps Recruiting Service Ribbon
5th Row	Vietnam Service Medal with palm	Republic of Vietnam Campaign Medal	Kuwait Liberation Medal (Saudi Arabia)	Kuwait Liberation Medal (Kuwait)

During his career in the Marine Corps, Baker was decorated many times, receiving awards from both the United States of America, the Republic of Vietnam, and Kuwait. Among his awards are the Legion of Merit, which he received three times, the Bronze Star with Valor Device, the Purple Heart, the Joint Service Commendation Medal, Navy & Marine Corps Commendation Medal with one bronze star device and one Valor Device, the Vietnam Service Medal with four campaign stars, the National Defense Service Medal, the Armed Forces Expeditionary Medal, the Humanitarian Service Medal, the Combat Action Ribbon, the Marine Corps Recruiting Ribbon, the Navy and Marine Corps Sea Service Deployment Ribbon with three campaign stars, the Vietnam Campaign Medal, and the Kuwait Liberation Medal. Additionally, Baker received the Navy & Marine Corps Parachutist Badge and qualified as a combat diver.

== Bibliography ==
- Crisis Management: A Model for Managers, 1993, by Wheeler L. Baker, ISBN 0-9641182-0-3
- We'll All Die As Marines: One Marine's Journey From Private To Colonel, 2012, by Jim Bathhurst
- Cadence, 2009, by Hargrave Military Academy Yearbook Staff
- Years of Change; Years of Growth: A History of Hargrave Military Academy 1970-2003, 2004, by Mary M. Tallent, OCLC 191884528

== Education ==
- 1972 Bachelor of Arts in economics, University of Tampa, Tampa, Florida
- Master of Arts in international affairs, Catholic University of America, Washington, D.C.
- Master of Science in strategic decision making, Naval War College, Newport, Rhode Island
- Master of Science in management, Salve Regina College, Newport, Rhode Island
- 1998 Doctor of Philosophy, organizational learning and instructional technologies, University of New Mexico, Albuquerque, New Mexico
