= Hargrave Military Academy =

Military boarding school in Virginia, United States

Coordinates: 36°49′54″N 79°24′07″W

- HMA

Location
- 200 Military Drive; Chatham, Virginia 24531; United States

Information
- Type: Private; college preparatory; boarding; day; military academy
- Motto: Mens sana in corpore sano (A sound mind in a sound body.)
- Established: 1909
- Founder: T. Ryland Sanford & J. Hunt Hargrave
- President: Eric F. Peterson
- Dean: Dr. Jimmy Tung, Ph.D.
- Chaplain: Michael Washington
- Grades: 7-Post Graduate
- Gender: All-Male
- Enrollment: 200
- Campus: Rural
- Colors: Black and Orange
- Athletics conference: Virginia Independent Schools Athletic Association (VISAA)
- Mascot: Tiger
- Nickname: Tigers
- Rivals: Fork Union Military Academy; Fishburne Military School
- Accreditation: Virginia Association of Independent Schools (VAIS), Cognia, and Virginia Council for Private Education (VCPE)
- Yearbook: Cadence
- Tuition: Day school students: $17,850; Boarding students: $46,650; International students: $56,650
- Revenue: $8.49 million (2023)
- Affiliation: Baptist General Association of Virginia
- Website: www.hargrave.edu
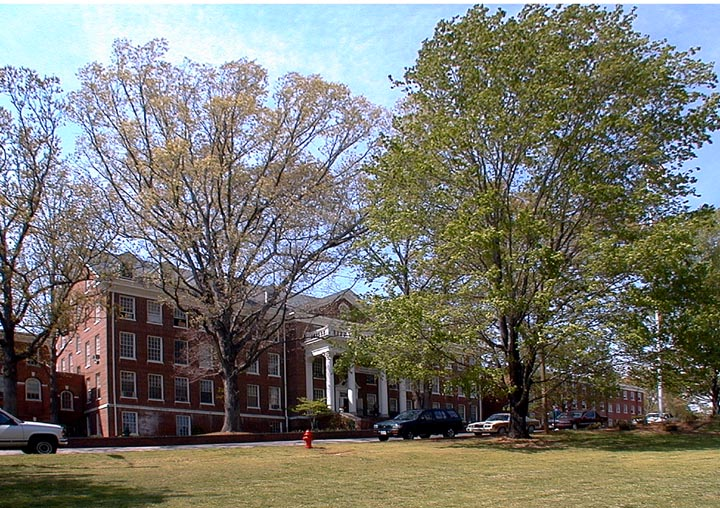
- Camden Hall, Hargrave's administration building

Hargrave Military Academy (HMA) is a private, all-male, military boarding school located in the town of Chatham, Virginia. Hargrave is affiliated with the Baptist General Association of Virginia emphasizing Christian values. Hargrave is a preparatory institution for college and United States service academies, with boys in grade 7 through post-graduate (PG). Hargrave is accredited by Virginia Association of Independent Schools (VAIS), Cognia, and Virginia Council for Private Education (VCPE), and is a member of the Association of Military Colleges and Schools of the United States and the National Association of Independent Schools. The school's campus is listed on the National Register of Historic Places.

Hargrave's athletics program has developed numerous noted basketball players and NFL players, and one early alumnus, William M. Tuck, served as the 25th Lieutenant Governor of Virginia and the 55th Governor of Virginia.

== History ==
Hargrave Military Academy was founded in 1909 by T. Ryland Sanford and John Hunt Hargrave as the Chatham Training School (CTS). The two founders brought in Charles R. Warren, founder and leader of the former Warren Training School that had operated in Chatham from 1906 to 1909, to serve as the first head-of-school at Hargrave.

In 1925, in honor of J. Hunt Hargrave's extensive financial and organizational support to the school, CTS was renamed to Hargrave Military Academy (HMA). The renaming also served to remove ambiguity about the nature of the school, as Hargrave had already adopted the style and methods of a military high school by the 1920s. HMA has been approved for JROTC numerous times since then, but many in the Hargrave community, most notably the board of trustees, feared that the addition of that program would put too much emphasis on military studies and reduce the emphasis on academics. HMA has consistently operated independent of JROTC, however, including by utilizing its own uniforms, cadet rank structure, and chain of command.

On February 20, 1950, a fire destroyed Hargrave Hall and Founders Hall. No cadets or faculty were harmed, but Sanford Hall was the only building that remained unscathed. After an assembly before Colonel Camden in the Sanford Hall auditorium, a two-week vacation was declared. This was to allow time for Hargrave staff to work out a way to continue the regular academic schedule.

The first African-American cadets were admitted to Hargrave in summer 1971 after the board of trustees passed a resolution that Hargrave would not consider race, color, or country of origin in its admission or employment policy and Colonel Vernon T. Lankford signed the Civil Rights Agreement. Andrew Ballen became the first black battalion commander in 1991.

With enrollment at 586 for the 1970–1971 academic year, the Hargrave Corps of Cadets was organized into two battalions led by a corps commander with the rank of cadet colonel. Since 1971, the HMA Corps of Cadets has remained as a single battalion; its commander is a cadet lieutenant colonel. Female cadets were admitted for the first time in the 1975–1976 year, and Geri Lou Huizinga and Lynn Emerson became the first women to graduate from HMA in 1976. Hargrave made the transition back to an all-male school in the early 2000s; the last female cadets graduated in 2009.

In 1981, the school presented for the first time the General Douglas MacArthur Award; the first cadet to receive it was Henry A. Haymes. That same year, school officials turned down the request to film on campus by the producers of the movie Taps, due to disagreements with film's plot and opposition to the producers’ request to erect a wall around the front of the campus.

A four-week summer program began in 2009. In September, Hargrave celebrated the school's 100th founders day under the leadership of Colonel Wheeler L. Baker. In 2021, a Hargrave graduate made history as the Honorable Sloan D. Gibson, HMA Class of 1971, returned as the first alumnus to serve as President of Hargrave.

=== Organization ===
Hargrave Military Academy is governed by a board of trustees, who together with the president act as the governors of the school. Hargrave created a charitable foundation to allow philanthropists an opportunity to make gifts to the school. Thirteen men have led Hargrave as president since its foundation, while the first leader, Charles R. Warren, held the title of headmaster.

Presidents of HMA:

- Headmaster Charles R. Warren (1909–1911)
- Rev. T. Ryland Sanford (1911–1918)
- Col. Aubrey H. Camden (1918–1951)
- Col. Joseph Hathaway Cosby (1951–1970)
- Col. Vernon Thomas Lankford Sr. (1970–1987)
- Col. Michael Bruce Colegrove (1987–1989)
- Col. Andrew W. Todd (1989–1990)
- Col. Thomas N. Cunningham (1990–1997)
- Col. John W. Ripley, USMC (ret.) (1997–1999)
- Dr. Wheeler L. Baker, Col. USMC (ret.) (1999–2011)
- Brig. Gen. Doyle Broome, USA (ret.) (2011–2017)
- Dr. Wheeler L. Baker, Col. USMC (ret.) (2017–2018)
- Col. Michael Allen Brown, USMC (ret.) (2018–2021)
- The Honorable Sloan D. Gibson, former deputy secretary, U.S. Department of Veterans Affairs (2021–2022)
- Eric F. Peterson (2022–2025)
- The Honorable Sloan D. Gibson, former deputy secretary, U.S. Department of Veterans Affairs (2025–present)

== Teachings and curriculum ==
One of Hargrave Military Academy's four pillars is academic excellence. Both Standard and Advanced High School Diplomas are offered to graduating cadets, as well as dual-enrollment classes through Danville Community College, Liberty University, and Richard Bland College. In addition to the 7–12 grade middle and high school, a one-year postgraduate program is also offered. Eligible students can enroll in a variety of honors and AP classes. Cadets have the opportunity to make academic honor rolls every grading period, consisting of the dean's List and president's list. Postgraduate students are eligible for the President's Commendation list.

In 2003 and 2011 Hargrave completed two upgrades to its academic space, including four laboratory areas, a new art studio, a distance learning center, a leadership center and a greatly expanded video production classroom where cadets produce weekly announcement videos. Hargrave's campus contains a refurbished auditorium.

=== Colin Powell Center for Leadership & Ethics ===
Hargrave Military Academy offers a General Colin Powell Center for Leadership & Ethics. It was established to provide Cadets with a challenging, progressive and structured leadership education in an academic environment and through applying learned leadership techniques in day-to-day situations.

Cadets are given the opportunity to enroll in a formal Leadership and Ethics Class (a ½ credit class of 18 weeks in length). The curriculum includes an investigation of the foundations of leadership such as Leadership Traits, Leadership Principles, Leadership Styles and Ethical Behavior. During their sophomore year, cadets begin to assume positions as small unit leaders (squad leaders) which permits practical application of the leadership principles learned in the classroom. Upon completion of this Leadership 1 course, cadets can enroll in Leadership 2, which goes into more detail on the leadership traits, principles, and techniques encouraged by General Colin Powell.

Cadets who complete the requirements of the Colin Powell Leadership Program may apply for the Colin Powell Leadership Medal; an honor only select cadets achieve. If they are accepted, cadets will earn the Colin Powell Leadership Medal, and, upon graduation, a Certificate in Leadership Studies along with their Hargrave Military Academy diploma.

== Military structure ==
According to its website, "Hargrave's military program is designed to present an environment in which a Cadet may gain a sense of humor, commitment, and fidelity. The daily exposure of a military environment assists Cadets in developing self-discipline, character, ethics, team building, and leadership." Military aspects include the wearing of uniforms, a military-style organization of personnel, ranks, and a chain of command. Hargrave issues its own dress uniforms and PTG, but provides cadets with US Army-style army combat uniforms.

=== Corps of Cadets ===
The Corps of Cadets consists of a battalion divided into four companies: Alpha, Bravo, Delta, and Band, with a small number of cadets assigned to the battalion staff. Every six weeks grading period, an "Honor Company" is chosen. The honor company is the company with the best overall academic and military performance. For winning, they eat first at mess, and display a streamer on their guidon.

The rank structure at Hargrave is similar to that of the United States Army, and includes the rank of basic cadet.

After attending Non-Commissioned Officers (SNCO) School prior to the beginning of the academic year, cadets can obtain NCO ranks and positions. One cadet is appointed to the rank of command sergeant major, serving on battalion staff as the highest-ranking NCO.

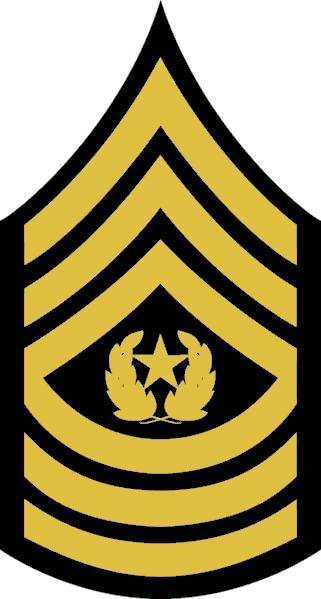
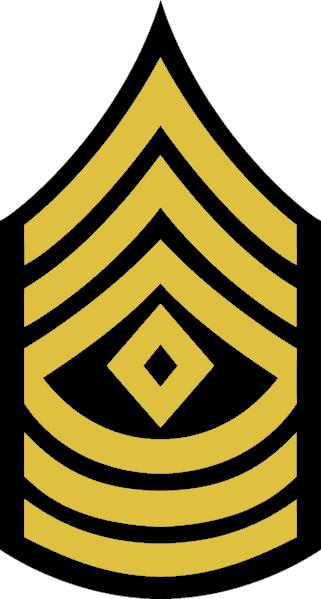
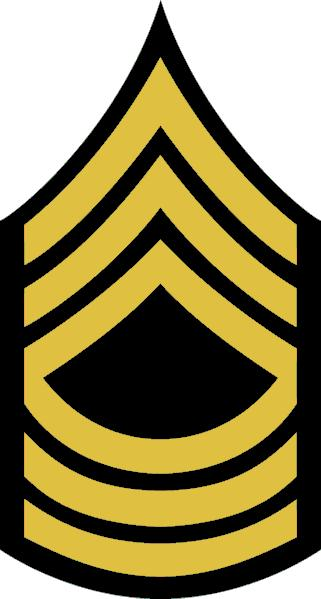
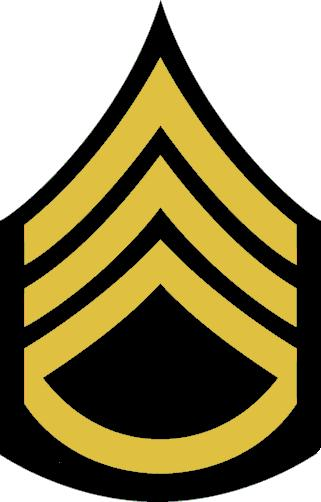
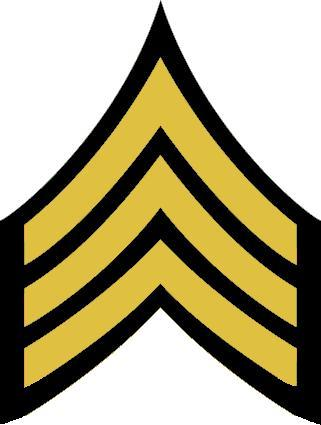
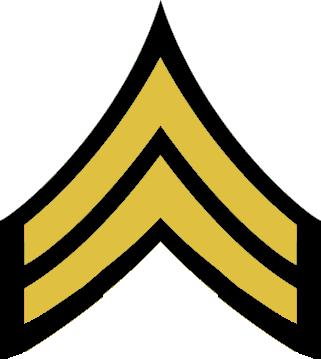
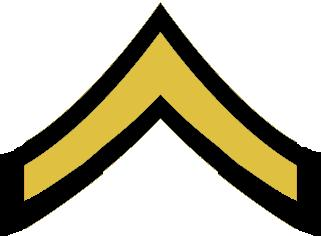
Grade	C-9	C-8		C-7	C-6	C-5	C-4	C-3	C-2	C-1
Insignia										No Insignia
Title	Sergeant Major	First Sergeant	Master Sergeant	Sergeant First Class	Staff Sergeant	Sergeant	Corporal	Private First Class	Private	Basic Cadet
Abbreviation	SGM	1SG	MSG	SFC	SSG	SGT	CPL	PFC	PVT	BC

The week before the start of their senior year, cadets have the option of attending Officer Candidate School (OCS), which allows them to obtain commissioned officer ranks. The OCS Completion Ribbon is awarded to those cadets who finish OCS. A cadet officer can hold many leadership positions ranging from auxiliary to Battalion Commander. The corps is run by the cadet officers and is supervised by the military faculty members. The battalion commander is the commanding officer of the corps. The battalion XO is the second highest position in the Corps of Cadets, whose primary job is to manage the battalion staff. The battalion staff is responsible for all operations throughout the corps. Blouse rank insignia on HMA dress uniforms is similar to those used at West Point, with large yellow and black edged stripes.

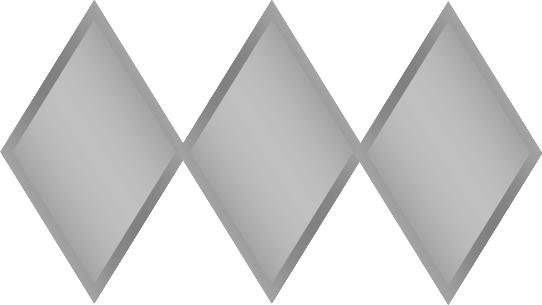
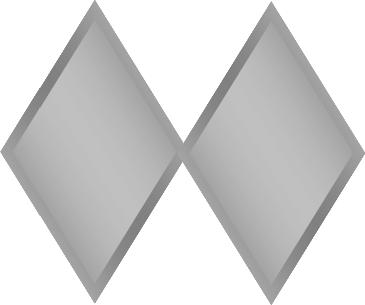
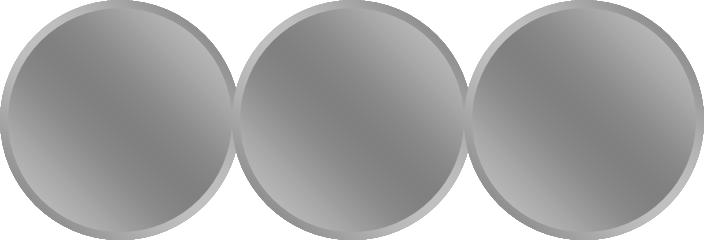
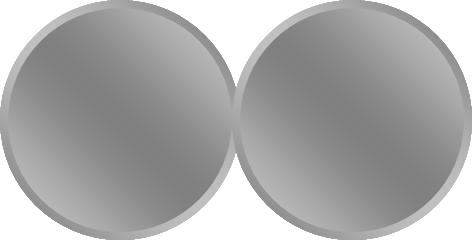
Grade	CO-6	CO-5	CO-4	CO-3	CO-2	CO-1
Insignia
Title	Colonel	Lieutenant Colonel	Major	Captain	First Lieutenant	Second Lieutenant
Abbreviation	COL	LTC	MAJ	CPT	1LT	2LT

=== Discipline ===
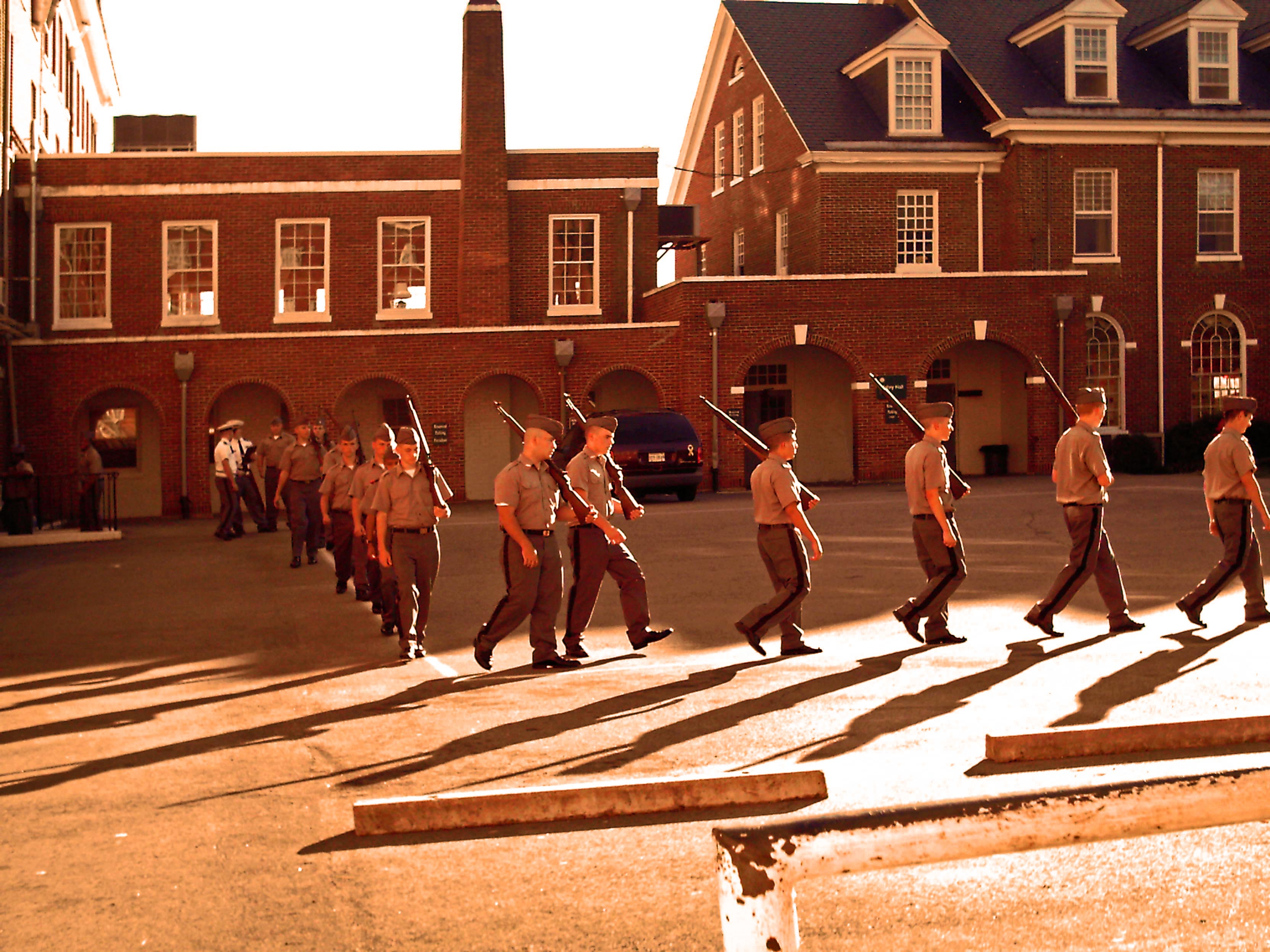
The Bullring

Notable at Hargrave is the notorious Bullring, a square painted on cement in the middle of campus. Cadets who violate any of the rules and regulations may be sent to the Bullring to walk tours. One hour of walking around the Bullring in uniform makes up a single tour.

== Athletics ==
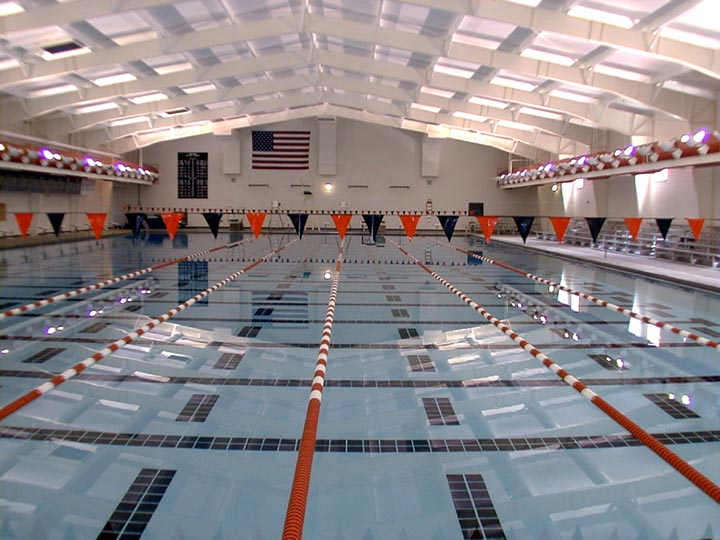
The Onishi-Davenport Aquatic Center

=== Varsity ===
Hargrave fields many varsity athletic teams, including football, basketball, baseball, wrestling, soccer, golf, tennis, diving, cross country, track and field, and swimming.

=== Postgraduate basketball ===
The Tigers have won three National Prep Championships since a formal tournament began in the mid-2000s. The program has produced hundreds of players that went on to play NCAA Division I basketball, and 26 that have gone on to play in the National Basketball Association. The program has also been a breeding ground for college coaches, as many former head coaches and assistants have ascended through the ranks at the NCAA Division I level. The Hargrave Military Academy basketball program was named "Program of the Decade" by RealGM in 2012 after a study showing that Hargrave produced more successful college basketball players than any other prep school or high school in the nation. The program was also featured on a season 2 episode of CNN's Inside Man.

== Notable alumni ==
=== Politics, military, and business ===
- Lieutenant General William B. Caldwell IV (1972) – former commander of United States Army North (5th Army), current president of Georgia Military College.
- Walter Davis (1938) – former CEO of Occidental Petroleum
- Sloan D. Gibson (1971) — U.S. secretary of veterans affairs, president of Hargrave Military Academy (2021–2022, 2025-present)
- Walter B. Jones (1961) – U.S. Representative for North Carolina's 3rd congressional district
- William M. Tuck- 55th Governor of Virginia (1946–1950), 25th lieutenant governor of Virginia (1942–1946), U.S. representative for Virginia's 5th District (1953–1969)

=== Literature, television and arts ===
- Andrew Ballen (1991) – A&R executive, entrepreneur and TV personality in mainland China
- Tom Robbins – Novelist, short story writer, essayist

=== Baseball ===
- Jon Nunnally (1990) – Major League Baseball player
- Taylor Sanford (1925) – head coach of 1955 College World Series champion Wake Forest

=== Basketball ===
- Larry Brown '59, former head coach of the Charlotte Bobcats, New York Knicks, Detroit Pistons, Philadelphia 76ers, Indiana Pacers, Los Angeles Clippers, San Antonio Spurs, New Jersey Nets, Denver Nuggets
- Kęstutis Marčiulionis '96, former player for Delaware who most recently played professionally with Volukte Kaunas. Won a bronze medal at the 2000 Summer Olympics with Lithuania.
- Lonny Baxter ‘98, Chicago Bulls
- Anthony Grundy ‘98, Atlanta Hawks
- Korleone Young ‘98, Detroit Pistons
- Ronald Blackshear '99, former player for Temple and Marshall. Last played professionally for CSU Atlassib Sibiu.
- Josh Howard ‘99, Dallas Mavericks
- David West ‘99, Golden State Warriors
- Tony Bobbitt ‘00, Los Angeles Lakers
- Brian Chase ‘00, Los Angeles Lakers
- A. W. Hamilton '00, Head coach of the Eastern Kentucky Colonels
- James Thomas ‘00, Philadelphia 76ers
- Sharrod Ford ‘01, Phoenix Suns
- Ricky Shields '01, former player for Rutgers. Last played for Mitteldeutscher BC.
- James White ‘01, former player New York Knicks
- Tim Smith '02, former player for East Tennessee State. Last played professionally for BSC Raiffeisen Panthers Fürstenfeld.
- Stanley Burrell '04, former player for Xavier and last played Czarni Słupsk.
- Lorrenzo Wade '04, former player for Louisville and San Diego State. Last played professionally for the Delaware 87ers of the NBA G League.
- Joe Alexander ‘05, American-Israeli player Milwaukee Bucks, Israel Basketball Premier League
- Ángel Daniel Vassallo '05, former player for Virginia Tech and currently playing professionally with Leones de Ponce. Member of the Puerto Rico national basketball team.
- Sam Young ‘05, former player Indiana Pacers
- Armon Bassett '06, former player for Indiana and Ohio. Last played professionally for Ironi Ramat Gan
- Vernon Macklin ’06, Detroit Pistons
- Tyler Smith '06, former player for Iowa and Tennessee. Last played for Elitzur Eito Ashkelon of the Israeli National League.
- Marreese Speights ‘06, former player Orlando Magic
- Jeff Allen '07, former player for Virginia Tech. First player in ACC history to record 1,500 career points, 1,000 rebounds, 200 steals and 150 blocked shots.
- Jordan Crawford ‘07, former player for Boston Celtics
- Mike Scott ‘07, Atlanta Hawks
- Dee Bost ‘08, Portland Trail Blazers
- Tommy Brenton '08, former player for Stony Brook. Last played professionally for Link Tochigi Brex. 2013 Lefty Driesell Award winner.
- Eshaunte Jones '08, former player for Nebraska and Northern Kentucky.
- Damier Pitts '08, former player for Marshall and current professional player for Godel Rabotnički.
- Maurice Creek '09, former player for Indiana and George Washington and current professional player for Prometey Kamianske of the Ukrainian Basketball SuperLeague
- Luke Hancock ‘09, former player for Memphis Grizzlies
- Lorenzo Brown ‘10, basketball player in the Israeli Basketball Premier League, formerly in the NBA
- J.J. Mann '10, former player for Belmont and current professional player for Okapi Aalstar
- PJ Hairston ‘11, former player Charlotte Hornets
- Dez Wells ‘11, Zhejiang Lions
- Montrezl Harrell ‘12, Atléticos de San Germán
- Codi Miller-McIntyre '12, former player for Wake Forest and current professional player for KK Cedevita Olimpija.
- Ryan Taylor '12, former player for Marshall and former professional player for Íþróttafélag Reykjavíkur.
- Shannon Evans '13, former player for Arizona State and Buffalo and current professional player for Atomerőmű SE
- Anton Gill '13, former player for Louisville and Nebraska. Current professional player in Iraq.
- Terry Rozier ‘13, Charlotte Hornets
- Donte Grantham ‘14, Tokyo Sunrockers
- Jon Davis ‘15, Orlando Magic, Hapoel Haifa of the Israeli Basketball Premier League
- Hassani Gravett ’15, Pallacanestro Cantù
- Naji Marshall '17, Dallas Mavericks
- K. D. Johnson '20, Auburn Tigers

=== Football ===
- Branden Albert – National Football League player for the Miami Dolphins
- Curtis Brinkley – NFL player
- Ahmad Brooks – NFL player for the San Francisco 49ers
- Zach Brown – NFL player for the Buffalo Bills
- Martavis Bryant – NFL wide receiver for the Pittsburgh Steelers
- Quinton Coples – NFL player for the New York Jets
- Ego Ferguson Jr. – NFL player
- Jared Gaither – NFL player who last played for the San Diego Chargers
- Laurence Gibson (2008) – NFL player
- Charles Grant (2002) – NFL defensive end
- Vidal Hazelton (2006) – CFL player for Edmonton Eskimos
- Anthony Hill – NFL player
- Torry Holt (1995) – NFL player, 7-time Pro Bowler and a member of the Super Bowl XXXIV champion St. Louis Rams
- John Jerry – NFL player for the New York Giants
- Brandon Lang – football player who last played for the Ottawa Redblacks
- Solomon Page (1995) – NFL player
- Jerrell Powe – NFL player for the Houston Texans
- Justin Senior – Kansas City Chiefs offensive tackle
- Jyles Tucker – NFL player
- DJ Ware – NFL player who last played for the Tampa Bay Buccaneers
- Muhammad Wilkerson – NFL player for the Green Bay Packers
- D. J. Williams – American football player and coach
- Keiland Williams – Former NFL Player

=== NASCAR ===
- Ward Burton (1982) – NASCAR driver, 2002 Daytona 500 winner

=== Notable attendees ===
- Tarell Basham – NFL defensive end for Cincinnati Bengals
- Leonard Floyd – NFL linebacker for Chicago Bears
- Shaq Lawson – NFL defensive end for Buffalo Bills
- Evan Marriott
- Jarran Reed – NFL defensive tackle for Seattle Seahawks
- Isaiah Swann (born 1985), professional basketball player
- Cordrea Tankersley – NFL cornerback for Miami Dolphins
- Mike Tyson – NFL cornerback for Seattle Seahawks
- Stephen Wallace (2000–2001) – NASCAR driver
