= Aubrey H. Camden =

American career educator

Aubrey Heyden Camden (July 28, 1886 - March 7, 1973) was a career educator who served as the second President of Hargrave Military Academy under its original name of Chatham Training School and the first to lead the school under its new name starting in 1925.

A lifelong Virginian, Camden held the Presidency at Hargrave for 33 years, taking office in 1918 and retiring in 1951. He lived in retirement in the Chatham, Virginia area for another 22 years, and died in 1973 at the age of 86.

== Early life ==
The son of Willie Campbell Camden and Horsley Barnes Camden, Aubrey Heyden Camden was born at Sedalia in Bedford County, Virginia on July 28, 1886. He grew up on a farm, his beginning education being at a one-room school approximately two miles from his home. The annual instruction period of such schools rarely lasted more than five months. During summer months, Aubrey Camden worked to grow and sell crops in order to pay his school expenses.

In September 1904, he entered Fork Union Academy, a private boys' boarding school. Three years later Camden graduated as a member of the Class of 1907. Afterwards, he taught for one year at a one-room school in Bedford County. Camden enrolled at the University of Richmond, then known as the Richmond College. He received a Bachelor of Arts degree from this college in 1911. Camden married Bessie Wheat of Bedford County on September 12, 1911. They had one son, A. Snead Camden, who became a dental surgeon and had five children.

== Career ==
Aubrey Camden's teaching career began when he was eighteen years old, with no more than a high school education from Fork Union Military Academy behind him. In the fall of 1911, now a college graduate, Camden returned to his old high school as an instructor in mathematics for the 1911-1912 school year. Afterwards he moved to Northern Virginia, becoming the principal of West-End Alexandria High School at 26 years old. Camden completed the 1912-1913 school year as head of West-End Alexandria High School, then headed south to Chatham, Virginia, to take on the dual position of Dean and Professor of Mathematics at the Chatham Training School. He proceeded to hold that position for the next five years.

In 1918, at the end of the 1917-1918 school year, T. Ryland Sanford, the first President of the Chatham Training School, resigned, and recommended to the school's Board of Trustees that Aubrey Camden be his successor. The Board concurred with Sanford's recommendation, and Camden rose to the office of President and started his first year as head of the school in the fall of 1918. Seven years later, Camden oversaw the renaming of the Chatham Training School to Hargrave Military Academy, serving two purposes: first, clarifying the type of school it was and the kind of student desired, and second, making a fitting tribute to the long-standing support of a local well-to-do farmer and businessman, J. Hunt Hargrave. This name change made Aubrey Camden the second and final President of the Chatham Training School, and the first President of Hargrave Military Academy under its new name.

Camden proceeded to remain as the head of Hargrave for another twenty-six years, retiring at the end of the 1950-1951 school year. Aubrey H. Camden officially retired on July 28, 1951, his sixty-fifth birthday, turning leadership of Hargrave Military Academy over to Joseph H. Cosby.

== Retirement and death ==
The Hargrave Military Academy Board of Trustees elected Camden as President-Emeritus soon after his retirement, and a group of alumni presented him with a Chevrolet automobile as a gesture of thanks for his years of service to Hargrave. Following his retirement, Colonel Camden served on the Board of Tax Assessors of Pittsylvania County, as Chairman of the County March of Dimes, and aided the establishment of the Shanaberger Homes following his retirement. As of 1959, he was a member of the Faith Home Board of Trustees. Colonel Camden published a book covering the first fifty years of Hargrave Military Academy history, "Fifty Years of Christian Education in a Baptist School: A Historical Record of Hargrave Military Academy" in the same year.

Camden died at the Roman Eagle Memorial Home in Danville, Virginia on March 7, 1973. He was 86. His funeral service was held at 11AM in the Owen R. Cheatham Chapel on the campus of Hargrave Military Academy, and he was buried in the Chatham Burial Park. He was survived by his son, two brothers, three sisters, and five grandchildren.

== Legacy ==
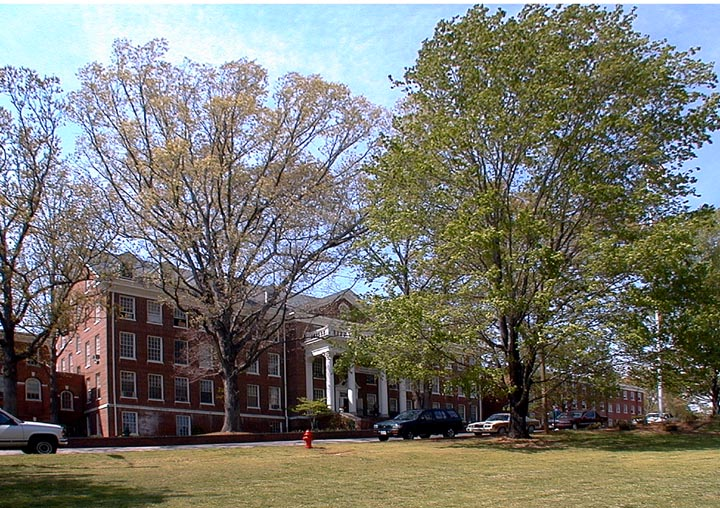
Camden Hall in 2006

Out of his thirty-nine years working at Hargrave Military Academy, Aubrey Camden was President for thirty-three, longer than any other leader in the history of the school. The modern-day name of the school is part of Camden's legacy; it was under his leadership that the name Hargrave Military Academy was adopted in 1925.

Camden was the first President of Hargrave to be given the honorary rank of colonel, represented by the three four-sided diamonds used by U.S. Army ROTC. Prior to the Presidency of Eric Peterson (2022-present), all Presidents of Hargrave who had not attained the grade of O-6 or higher in the U.S. Armed Forces were given the honorary rank of colonel.

During Joseph H. Cosby's first year as Hargrave's third President (1951-1952), an elite drill team of cadets was organized; it was named the Camden Rifles in honor of the former school president.

The fire that ravaged the campus of Hargrave in 1950 resulted in a decade's worth of work to rebuild and replace destroyed barracks and facilities. Colonel Camden's initial work towards Hargrave's recovery was followed up on by Colonel Cosby, and when the new building housing the offices of the President, admissions staff, and all other key administration was completed in 1963, it was named Camden Hall in Aubrey H. Camden's honor. Camden Hall continues to function as the headquarters building of Hargrave Military Academy to the present day.

== Education ==
- 1907 High School Diploma, Fork Union Military Academy, Fork Union, Virginia
- 1911 Bachelor of Arts degree, University of Richmond, Richmond, Virginia
