= Colin Vint =

American soccer player

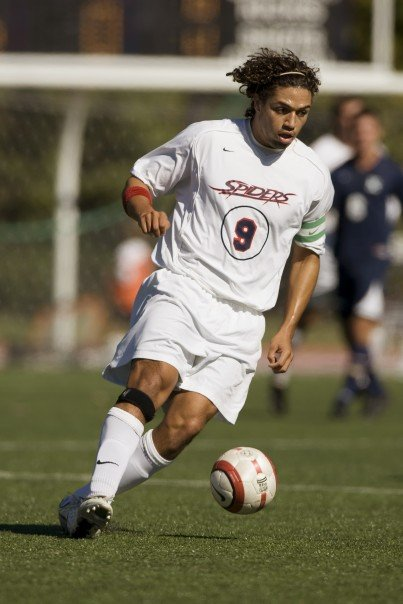
- Vint in action at University of Richmond

Personal information
- Full name: Colin da Silva Vint
- Date of birth: November 20, 1984 (age 41)
- Place of birth: Bethesda, U.S.
- Height: 6 ft 2 in (1.88 m)
- Position: Forward

Youth career
- 2002–2005: University of Richmond

Senior career*
Years	Team	Apps	(Gls)
2006	Bray Wanderers	4	(0)
2007–2008	SV Henstedt-Rhen	10	(3)
- * Club domestic league appearances and goals

Colin Vint (born November 20, 1984) is an American former professional soccer player who most recently played as a forward.

== Career ==
Vint was born in Bethesda, Maryland. He is a graduate of Chantilly High School and began his soccer career in college, where he played for the University of Richmond Spiders. In four years he played 71 games and was a member of the 2002 Atlantic 10 All-Rookie Team and 2003–2005 All-Conference Teams, as well as the National Soccer Coaches Association of America (NSCAA) South Atlantic Region All-American in 2003 and 2005.

He was signed by League of Ireland side Bray Wanderers in the summer of 2006. Vint netted seven goals in six appearances for the U-21s, and garnered three starts for the first team before a fractured cheekbone sidelined him. In total he made five first team appearances.

In December 2006, Vint signed with the German club SV Henstedt-Rhen, where he made his debut in January 2007 to the tune of two goals and one assist in a 4–2 victory over VfL 93 Hamburg.
