= Next Step Realty =

Real estate brokerage firm in New York, United States

- Type: Private company
- Industry: Real estate
- Founded: 2010; 16 years ago
- Founders: Blair Brandt & Belton Baker
- Headquarters: New York City, United States
- Products: Apartments in New York City
- Number of employees: 40 (2015)
- Website: www.thenextsteprealty.com

Next Step Realty is an American real estate brokerage firm based in New York City, New York. The agents help young professionals rent and buy apartments in New York City. Many of their clients are recent college and post-graduate alumni relocating to New York City, as first-time New York City renters.

In 2015, ABC Family announced that a business-based docu-series would be created to follow Next Step Realty and their clients, in an unscripted, original format. It was not renewed after its only season.

== History ==
Blair Brandt and Belton Baker co-founded Next Step Realty, following a soft launch in 2010. After working in the real estate market in Florida, Brandt noticed an opportunity to assist young professionals in finding their first urban homes and in particular a lack of ethical, customer-friendly rental services in New York City.

Brandt moved to New York City, following a $100,000 capital infusion from angel investor Jason Briggs, who was then elected to be chairman, becoming a day to day presence 'offering a more experienced perspective', and Brandt's primary partner. The soft launch led to the company expanding quickly, and Brandt, aged 23, was listed as the featured real estate entrepreneur in Forbes annual 30 under 30.

Shortly after the launch of the company, the founders distributed a mailshot to peers and other college friends. Within the first month, the company had 100,000 visits to their website. In late 2012, the company announced the acquisition of one of their competitors in the New York City realtor market, Post Graduate Apartments.

== Locations ==
In 2014, the firm opened its first two storefront locations in New York City, in the East Village & Upper East Side of Manhattan. In March 2015, Next Step opened its third storefront location, and new flagship office, in the West Village of Manhattan, at the former townhouse of famed preservationist Jane Jacobs.

== Business model ==
One of the entry routes to the market for the company was to increase the range of amenities offered to customers while also charging a lower percentage of the broker fee, a dynamic made possible by the firm's high customer conversion rate.

The staff was predominantly made up of people in their mid-20s, who had experienced similar trials to their clients. In the company's first year, they grew to a staff of around 40 people.

During the same year, the company also announced a seed investment of $1 million to help expand the business to other cities in the United States.

== Next Step Realty: NYC ==
In April 2015, Disney announced the launch of a new show, Next Step Realty: NYC. The show would air on ABC Family, premiering Tuesday August 11, 2015 at 9pm ET on the cable network.
