= Charles E. Warren =

American glycobiologist (1962–2005)

- Born: September 17, 1962; Guildford, U.K.
- Died: July 30, 2005 (aged 42); Calgary, Alberta, Canada
- Education: University of Oxford
- Known for: Glycobiology
- Scientific career
- Fields: Glycobiology
- Workplaces: New Hampshire University
- Doctoral advisor: Raymond Dwek

Charles E. Warren (September 17, 1962 – July 30, 2005) was an assistant professor of biochemistry and molecular biology at the University of New Hampshire.

== Early life and education ==
Warren was born on September 17, 1962, in Guildford, UK. He was son of Joan (Staples) Warren and the late Charles Peter Warren. He was educated at Oxford University, where he received his PhD in 1989 under the mentorship of Raymond Dwek, an eminent early leader in glycobiology. His thesis was entitled Glycosylation in Mice and Rats.

== Research ==
After graduation he helped establish the first commercially focused effort in glycotechnology: Oxford Glycosystems, Ltd. He subsequently moved to Toronto, Canada, to broaden his interest in glycosyltransferase and spent his postdoctoral time with Dr. Harry Schachter at the Hospital for Sick Children in Toronto, and two years later across the street with Dr. Jim Dennis at the Lunenfeld-Tanenbaum Research Institute. Charles Warren moved to the University of New Hampshire in 2002 as an assistant professor in the Department of Biochemistry and Molecular Biology.

He conducted research on the structure-function relationships of glycosylation. These specific efforts focused on evolution, animal development and human diseases. He used C. elegans as his model organism.

== Awards ==
After only three years at the University of New Hampshire, he was nominated for a named professorship, the Class of 1944 Award. This university-wide award recognizes outstanding faculty members.

== Death ==
Charles Warren died on July 30, 2005, in a paragliding accident.

== Warren Workshops ==
Since 2006, Warren Workshops are held every second years in Warren's memory. The initial purpose of the Warren Workshop series on Glycoconjugate Analysis was to bring together concerned analysts in the field to discuss the various methodologies in use with the aim to share and appraise protocols for carbohydrate sequencing.

WW-I, July 6–9, 2006, UNH Glycomics Center, Durham, NH, USA; Organiser: Vern Reinhold

WW-II, July 9–12, 2008, UNH Glycomics Center, Durham, NH, USA; Organiser: Vern Reinhold

WW-III, August 27–30, 2010, Hindasgarden Conference Center, Hindås, Sweden; Organiser: Niclas G. Karlsson

WW-IV, August 8–11, 2012, CCRC, Athens, Georgia USA; Organisers: Mike Tiemeyer and Lance Wells

WW-V, August 6–9, 2014, University of Galway, Ireland; Organisers: Rob Woods and Pauline Rudd

WW-VI, August 24–26, 2016, Hokkaido University, Japan; Organisers: Kiyoko Aoki-Kinoshita and Hisashi Narimatsu

WW-VII, August 15–18, 2018, Boston University, Massachusetts, USA; Organisers: Joseph Zaia and Catherine Costello

WW-VIII, originally planned in August 2020, Grenoble University, France; Organisers: Anne Imberty, Sylvie Ricard-Blum and Frederique Lisacek, was postponed due to the COVID-19 pandemics. It became a joint event with the Glyco-bioinformatics Symposium of the Beilstein Institute for the Advancement of Chemical Sciences, held on-line, June 23–25, 2021.

WW-IX, was held in conjunction with the 4th AustralAsian Glycoscience Symposium, 22nd-25 November 2022, Gold Coast, QLD, Australia. Organisers: Daniel Kolarich, and Nicholas Scott.

WW-X, was held in conjunction with the 7th Canadian Glycomics Symposium, 28-29 May 2024 Edmonton, Alberta, Canada. Organisers: Ratmir Derda and Warren Wakarchuk of University of Alberta.
