= Charles R. Warren =

Charles R. Warren was an American teacher, the founder of the Warren Training School and the first and only headmaster of the Chatham Training School.

== Biography ==
Charles Warren, a graduate of the Trinity College in Durham, North Carolina, arrived in Chatham, Virginia, in 1906. He had heard of the dire need for schools in the Chatham area, and decided to take on the challenge himself. Warren organised a day school at the end of Merchant Street, which came to be known as the Warren Training School. WTS averaged an enrollment of twenty boys. After its third session in May 1909, a lack of funds forced Warren to close the school.

Warren was hired as headmaster of the Chatham Training School for the 1909–1910 year. He and John K. Hutton constituted the entire CTS faculty, presiding over seventeen boarding and eighteen day students. At the close of the second session in 1911, Charles R. Warren submitted his resignation. After Warren's departure, the office of headmaster was abolished at the Chatham Training School and replaced with the office of president, with Reverend T. Ryland Sanford being the first to hold the new title.

== Legacy ==
Charles R. Warren was the first to make a significant effort towards addressing the then-dire need for schools in and around Chatham, Virginia. Though this effort, the Warren Training School, was short-lived, it helped inspire the foundation of the Chatham Training School. Warren led this school during its very first years, helping it survive past the three years that WTS lasted. Warren's most lasting legacy is the ultimate survival of the Chatham Training School, now known as Hargrave Military Academy, to the present day.
