= Robert E. Trono =

American business executive

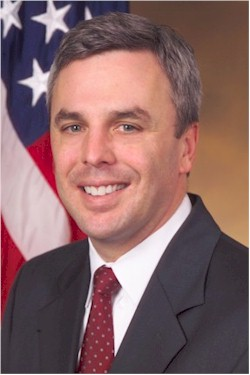
Robert E. Trono, Chief Security Officer for Lockheed Martin

Robert E. Trono is the current Vice President and Chief Security Officer of the Lockheed Martin Corporation in Bethesda, Maryland.

Prior to joining Lockheed Martin, he was Deputy Director of the United States Marshals Service. In this role, he was the Service's chief operating officer, overseeing a budget of $825 million and 10,000 full-time and contract employees. Among its missions, its primary responsibility is the security of 2,200 federal judges, 5500 federal prosecutors and more than 400 facilities throughout the nation. It also manages the United States Federal Witness Protection Program (WITSEC) which protects, relocates and gives new identities to threatened federal witnesses.

Trono also served in the United States Department of Justice (DOJ) as senior counsel to the Deputy Attorney General of the United States. He advised the Deputy Attorney General on a wide variety of matters and oversight responsibility over several agencies, including the Marshals Service and the Federal Bureau of Prisons.

From 1998 through 2004, Trono was an Assistant United States Attorney in the Eastern District of Virginia, where he handled a number of high-profile public corruption matters, including the successful prosecutions of four city council members. He also successfully prosecuted many violent drug enterprises, including 30 members of a gang responsible for over 20 murders.

Trono was a state prosecutor in multiple positions in Richmond, VA, where he prosecuted a wide variety of major felony cases and was lead prosecutor in more than 130 jury trials. He was also an adjunct professor at the University of Richmond School of Law and a frequent lecturer on trial tactics and criminal justers.

Trono attended the University of Richmond (B.S. in Business Administration, with honors) and the William and Mary School of Law (Award for Academic Achievement in Economic Analysis of Law).
