= Blair Brandt =

American political advisor

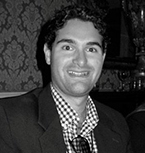
- Brandt in 2012
- Born: Blair Brandt; January 11, 1988 (age 38); Manhattan, New York, U.S.
- Education: Deerfield Academy; University of Richmond
- Known for: Realtor, reality show actor, animal welfare advocacy
- Spouse: Margit Brandt (m. 2017)
- Children: 2
- Awards: Forbes 30 Under 30 (2012)

Blair Brandt (born January 11, 1988) is an American real estate entrepreneur, former reality television personality, animal welfare advocate, and political advisor. He is the co-founder of Next Step Realty. Forbes listed Brandt in their annual 30 Under 30 list, at the age of 23.

In August 2015, Brandt began his role in ABC Family's docu-series Next Step Realty: NYC. In 2020, Brandt founded his own political consulting firm, The Brandt Group. He is also a real estate developer in coastal West Palm Beach, Florida and Chief Brand Officer for Margit Brandt in Palm Beach.

== Early life and education ==
Brandt was born in Manhattan, New York. He grew up in Palm Beach, Florida and attended Deerfield Academy in Massachusetts. Brandt completed his undergraduate education at the University of Richmond.

== Political engagement ==
A prominent ally of the Donald Trump administration, Brandt was a leading Republican strategist as well as a top GOP fundraiser between 2020 and 2025. Brandt served as the Florida co-chair for the Trump Victory Finance Committee 2020. Brandt has also served as an advisor to the President's daughter-in-law, Lara Trump. Brandt has routinely weighed in on US-China relations, specifically as an advocate for a fundamental re-alignment or decoupling of economic ties. Brandt co-hosted an October 2024 fundraiser at Mar-a-Lago in Palm Beach for President Trump, alongside other business leaders including sugar magnate Pepe Fanjul; investor John Phelan; real estate mogul Gary L. Schottenstein, and venture capitalist and investment banker Omeed Malik, according to the Palm Beach Daily News.

== Real estate ventures ==
Brandt's first job was working for Budweiser in the breakage (broken bottle re-assembly) room, and while he studied at the University of Richmond he also ran a laundry business.

Brandt started working as a realtor after he was cut from a Wall Street internship at Lazard. He spent the summer working for an independent Florida realtor named Christian Angle. At the time he noticed a number of age-related problems with the role. During his time with Angle servicing luxury sales clients, Brandt thought about providing the luxury service he observed to "kids right out of college who aren't there yet but might be in that category eventually".

After speaking to a number of friends about their realtor experiences in New York City, he noticed there could be an opportunity to assist young professionals in finding their first home in the city. "My friends were college graduates not getting good service," Brandt told Business Insider. In 2010, as a response to this deficit, Brandt co-founded Next Step Realty. Brandt and co-founder Belton Baker came up with the idea to provide an urban apartment-finding service to new graduates and wrote a 35-page business plan overnight that resulted in $19,000 in venture capital from friends and family. Some of the first few weeks of the company's operation were carried out from Brandt's Richmond dorm room.

In July 2011, shortly after the foundation of the company, it was listed by CNN as one of the most promising dorm room startups. After the initial success of his company, Brandt acquired competitor Post Graduate Apartments in 2012. At 23, Brandt was included in the Forbes 30 Under 30 list for his work in the real estate market.

With a seed infusion of $100,000 from Nantucket and Palm Beach-based angel investor Jason Briggs, Brandt moved to New York City in 2012 to turn his idea, then a website matching graduates with various approved realtors, into a full-service brokerage in the city. In 2025, in addition to being a real estate developer in West Palm Beach, Brandt began serving as Chief Brand Officer for his wife Margit's eponymous real estate brokerage operation in Palm Beach.

== Next Step Realty: NYC ==
In April 2015, it was announced that Brandt would appear in a new show focused on his firm Next Step Realty that would premiere on ABC Family, titled Next Step Realty: NYC. The show premiered on August 11, 2015. The show followed him and his employees as they built their real estate brokerage firm in NYC. The idea for show started through an employee of Brandt's. "Truth be told, an intern of mine was at a family dinner which included some people from ABC Family", Brandt said in an interview. According to Brandt, the show is "a story about startups and entrepreneurs, but it's also a story about young people graduating from college or people that are newcomers to New York City moving here, following their dreams, renting and what goes into that as well." Executive Producer Danielle Rossen said of the show, "Blair and his team are renting apartments, but selling the lifestyle." In light of the show, New York Daily News called Brandt "the new face of real estate reality TV." Brandt said "you hear about all these young companies but you never actually get to see how it all goes down every day behind the scenes."

== Animal welfare advocacy ==
On July 9, 2018, Brandt co-moderated a meeting in the Roosevelt Room of the White House, in which commercial dog breeders, animal welfare activists, Trump administration officials, Reps. Matt Gaetz (R-FL), Lou Barletta (R-PA), and Brian Fitzpatrick (R-PA), Lara Trump, and others met to discuss "raising the standards of care for dogs at large-scale commercial breeding operations", some of which are often to referred to by animal welfare activists as puppy mills. Brandt was described by the Humane Society of the United States as an animal welfare advocate.

In January 2019, the Humane Society announced that they would be presenting Brandt with the Humane Leader Award, alongside Lara Trump and Pam Bondi, for his efforts to end greyhound racing in Florida. Brandt received the award at a fundraiser which featured GOP politicians and animal welfare advocates Lara Trump, Pam Bondi, and Matt Gaetz. The event was hosted by John Rakolta, who was nominated in May 2018 by President Trump to be the next United States Ambassador to the United Arab Emirates. The purpose of the event was to "thank Brandt, a Palm Beach resident," and fundraise to "re-home the thousands of greyhounds that will be displaced ... including medical care for injured dogs, training and transportation".

According to The Palm Beach Post, Brandt "crafted and marshaled the campaign's political and public relations strategy among a group of unlikely supporters: Republicans." Brandt was also credited with "arranging media interviews with Lara Trump at Mar-a-Lago and urging sympathetic conservative lawmakers to write op-ed pieces for local newspapers." Those efforts "resulted in 69 percent of Florida voters approving a constitutional amendment ... that will phase out dog racing by 2020."

On November 25, 2019, President Trump signed into law the Preventing Animal Cruelty and Torture (PACT) Act, which authorized the FBI and other federal law enforcement agencies to prosecute malicious animal cruelty. The Humane Society credited Brandt, alongside Lara Trump, with "championing this bill and helping to shepherd it into law." Animal Wellness Action reported that Brandt and Lara Trump had encouraged President Trump to "put a capstone on our nation's legal framework against animal cruelty."

Amidst the COVID-19 pandemic, Brandt advocated in the Washington Examiner on April 6, 2020 for the closure of Chinese wet markets and the dog and cat meat trade alongside figures including Lara Trump, Anthony Fauci, Senator Lindsey Graham, and Rep. Kevin McCarthy. On April 8, 2020, The Chinese Ministry of Agriculture announced a plan to end the dog and cat meat trade on May 8, 2020, citing public concern during the pandemic.

== Personal life ==
Brandt is the son of Laura Vitale and arts patron Laurence Brandt Levine. His father, a Princeton University graduate who became the first chairman of the Dreyfoos School of the Arts, died in 2013. At the age of 16, Brandt negotiated his parents' divorce, saving his mother thousands in lawyer fees. Brandt began dating real estate agent Margit Weinberg, which was showcased on Next Step Realty: NYC. In an interview with Sandy Kenyon, reflecting on the relationship being used as a storyline for the show, Brandt said "It's not easy. And I didn't want to originally". Brandt and Weinberg married, and became parents to a son in December 2016. Brandt's full-time residence is in Palm Beach.
