= Charlie Warren (cricketer) =

Irish cricketer

Personal information
- Full name: Charles Christopher Morel Warren
- Born: 11 March 1979 (age 47); Portadown, Northern Ireland
- Batting: Right-handed
- Bowling: Right-arm slow

Domestic team information
- Years: Team
- 2000: Oxford Universities
- 2001–2002: Oxford UCCE
- 2001–2002: Oxford University

Career statistics
Competition	First-class
Matches	8
Runs scored	149
Batting average	12.41
100s/50s	–/–
Top score	40*
Catches/stumpings	5/–
- Source: Cricinfo, 28 March 2020

Charles Christopher Morel Warren (born 11 March 1979) is an Irish former first-class cricketer.

Warren was born at Portadown in Northern Ireland in March 1979. He later studied for his degree in England at Worcester College, Oxford. While studying at Oxford, Warren played first-class cricket. He made his debut for an Oxford Universities side, making three first-class appearances in 2000. The Oxford Universities team was a forerunner to Oxford UCCE which was formed the following year, with Warren subsequently representing Oxford UCCE in three first-class matches, with two appearances in 2001 and a single appearance in 2002. (Note: Oxford UCCE differed from Oxford University Cricket Club in that it was open to students at Oxford Brookes University, whereas Oxford University Cricket Club is exclusively for students of the constituent colleges of the University of Oxford.) He also made two first-class appearances for Oxford University against Cambridge University in The University Matches of 2001 and 2002. In eight first-class matches, Warren scored 149 runs at an average of 12.41, with a high score of 40 not out.
