= T. Ryland Sanford =

Thomas Ryland Sanford (September 4, 1878 – April 8, 1952) was the first President and Founder of the Chatham Training School, known since 1925 as Hargrave Military Academy.

== Biography ==
Sanford was born at Montross in Westmoreland County, Virginia. His parents were Reverend Millard F. Sanford and Eleanor Nevitt Sanford.

He graduated from the Richmond College (now the University of Richmond). In 1900, while a student there, he was awarded the Orator's Medal during a state contest held at Washington and Lee University.

Sanford married Margaret Taylor of Chesterfield County, Virginia after his graduation from the Richmond College. Together they had eight children- seven sons and one daughter. Margaret died in 1936, but Sanford remarried in 1946. His second wife was Gertrude Payne of Hanover County, Virginia.

In 1909, with financial assistance from J. Hunt Hargrave, he founded the Chatham Training School. He was President of the school from 1911 to 1918, when he resigned and turned over the position to Aubrey H. Camden, who was Dean at the time. He was later active at CTS as the first chairman of the board of trustees.

Sanford was a deeply religious man, and devoted the majority of his life to work as a pastor in various Virginia churches, such as the Chaptham Baptist Church. He was active in the Baptist General Association of Virginia and the Southern Baptist Convention. In later years, he became troubled by arthritis and had to preach from a chair.

== Death and legacy ==
Sanford was killed in an automobile accident on April 8, 1952. His name endures at Hargrave Military Academy, where he was active for many years as co-founder, second President, and first chairman of the board of trustees. The Sanford Hall barracks is named in his honor.

Sanford was described thus by Dr. F.W. Boatwright, who gave Sanford an honorary Doctorate in Divinity in 1922:

"Dr. Sanford, builder of churches and schools; forceful leader in community service; master of assemblies, able and eloquent minister of the word of God."
