= Jennie Dean =

American former slave, founder of churches and schools

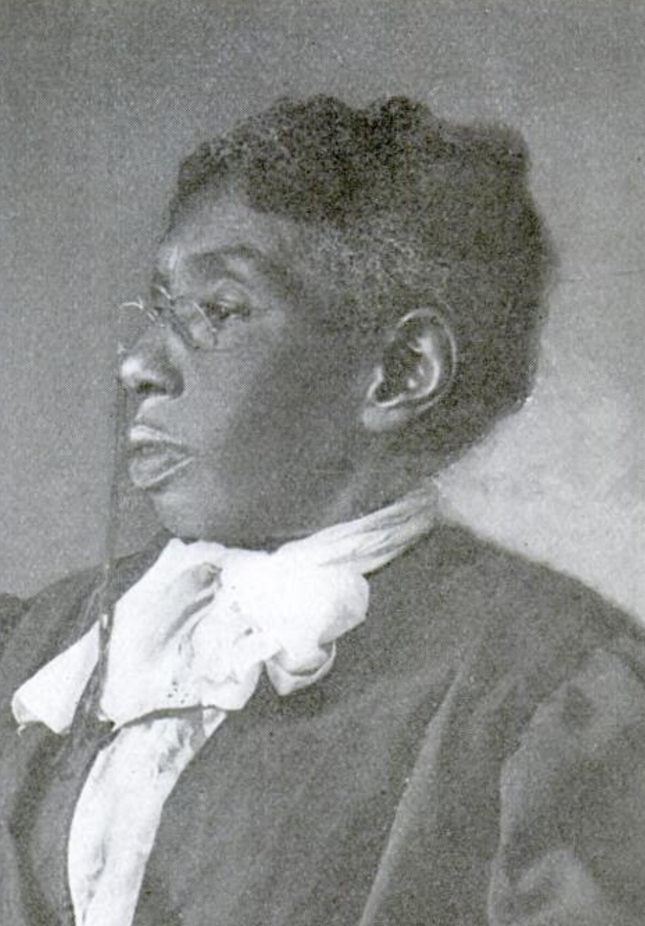

Personal details
- Born: April 15, 1848 Sudley Springs, Prince William County, Virginia
- Died: 3 May 1913 (aged 65) Catharpin, Prince William County, Virginia
- Occupation: Missionary, educator

Jane Serepta Dean (April 15, 1848 – May 3, 1913) (nicknamed "Jennie" or "Miss Jennie") was born into slavery in northern Virginia, freed as a result of the American Civil War, and became an important founder of churches and Sunday Schools for African Americans in northern Virginia. Dean founded the Manassas Industrial School for Colored Youth, which for more than four decades was the only institution of secondary education available to African-American youth in Northern Virginia, and one of only two in the state without overt religious affiliation.

== Early and family life ==
Jennie Dean was born to Charles Dean (a domestic servant) and his wife Annie, both of them African Americans born enslaved and owned by the Newman family, and later by the Cushing family. Her grandmother Mildred may have been of Native American ancestry. She had two sisters (Ella Dean and Mary Dean), both of whom married after the American Civil War, although Jennie Dean herself never married. Her sister Ella's death certificate lists Jennie's birth date as April 15, 1848, but another death certificate indicates Jennie Dean as born in 1853.

After Virginia seceded from the Union and the American Civil War began, Col. Cushing's sons joined the Confederate Army. The elder Cushing died shortly after learning one son had died in a battle near Warrenton, Virginia. Earlier, the First Battle of Manassas was fought near their home, and the Dean family stayed in their cabin and hoped to avoid the artillery shelling and crossfire. Afterward, on the master's instructions, her father and other enslaved men rescued wounded Confederate soldiers, and later buried many dead. The following year, the Second Battle of Manassas was fought on much of the same ground, since Manassas Junction was a railroad hub and Manassas Gap a key pass between coastal and the Piedmont region of Virginia.

== Career ==
After the war ended, Dean received rudimentary schooling at a Manly School. Although still a teenager in 1866, she sought domestic service work in Washington, D.C., taking the train home on weekends. In Washington, she attended a Congregational church, then joined the Nineteenth Street Baptist Church, as well as lived frugally.

Dean sent most of her wages home, which not only helped her family buy the farm they wanted and cope with her father's death, but also allowed her sister Ella to attend the Wayland Seminary and become a teacher. Dean could see many young African Americans leave farming (and the hopelessness of sharecropping for those unable to afford a down payment for land) and move to the nearby city. She was concerned that they would become stuck in low-wage jobs, as well as succumb to alcoholism and other social ills.

Dean tried to address this problem in part through her faith, and by helping to organize congregations. After securing land to construct Mt. Calvary Church (and establishing it), she also helped found Prosperity Chapel in Conklin, Loudoun County, Catharpin Chapel also near her home, and finally Dean-Divers Chapel (also in Prince William County, named for the Divers family of New Jersey contributors and Dean) in 1909. Meanwhile, Dean traveled around northern Virginia on weekends in a horse-drawn surrey and offered African-American youth instruction in what later would be called Victorian values, as well as in skilled trades. In 1878, Dean founded what would be the first of more than a dozen Sunday schools.

She continued fundraising for Sunday Schools and other improvement activities, especially during winters. She first sought employment and fundraising opportunities in Washington, D.C., and later with extended trips to New York City, and even in Boston, Massachusetts. She made the acquaintance of Oswald Garrison Villard, publisher of the New York Evening Post, who published a favorable biography of Dean, made many donations to programs she advocated, and in 1905 became chairman of the board of Manassas Industrial School for Colored Youth (although he criticized her management and ousted her as leader three years later). In Boston, Dean made the acquaintance of Edward Everett Hale, who not only donated money, but also opened social doors to Dean, including to Rev. Phillips Brooks and his Episcopalian congregation.

In 1890, Dean, her sister Ella and Jennie E. Thompson (a white woman who supported educating African Americans) decided to establish an industrial school in Manassas to serve African Americans in the five surrounding counties, and secured an option on a farm near the railroad station. They planned to teach the students useful skilled trades, as well as inculcate values of hard work and thrift.

It took almost three years to raise funds for the land down payment. In January 1893, Dean was invited to speak to a Women's Suffrage convention in Washington (after lobbying by her friend Orra Gray Langhorne of Lynchburg, Virginia). There she met heiress Emily Howland of Sherwood, New York, who donated the final $1000 to finish paying for the farm, as well as start building the first hall (which was named after Howland).

On October 7, 1893, Manassas Industrial School for Colored Youth received its charter. It accepted students the following fall. Frederick Douglass was among the speakers at the dedication ceremony that September. Dean took the title of financial agent, and also served on the board of directors and executive committee. Students could study liberal arts, as well as receive instruction in dressmaking, child care, blacksmithing, cooking, carpentry, shoemaking, and farming. However, after about a year in 1895, Howland Hall caught fire and burned down, so had to be rebuilt. Several years later, in 1900, the boys' dormitory also burned down.

Nonetheless, the school prospered, and received grants from Andrew Carnegie, among others. On February 14, 1906, Jennie Dean (and several students and faculty members) visited the White House to meet President Theodore Roosevelt, at the invitation of Booker T. Washington, to whom the President favorably compared Dean.

In 1908, however, Dean found herself pushed out of the school's management, after a critical report by accountants whom Villard had hired. Thompson and Dean had complained about the Villard faction's sexism, neglect of local donors and interests (white and black), and grandiose plans to revamp the institution into another Tuskegee Institute or Hampton Institute.

While Villard resigned as chairman of the board in March, 1913 (to be replaced by the institution's first black board chairman), he remained on the board. Meanwhile, Dean's health had deteriorated after a stroke, and she became nearly confined to her home.

== Death and legacy ==
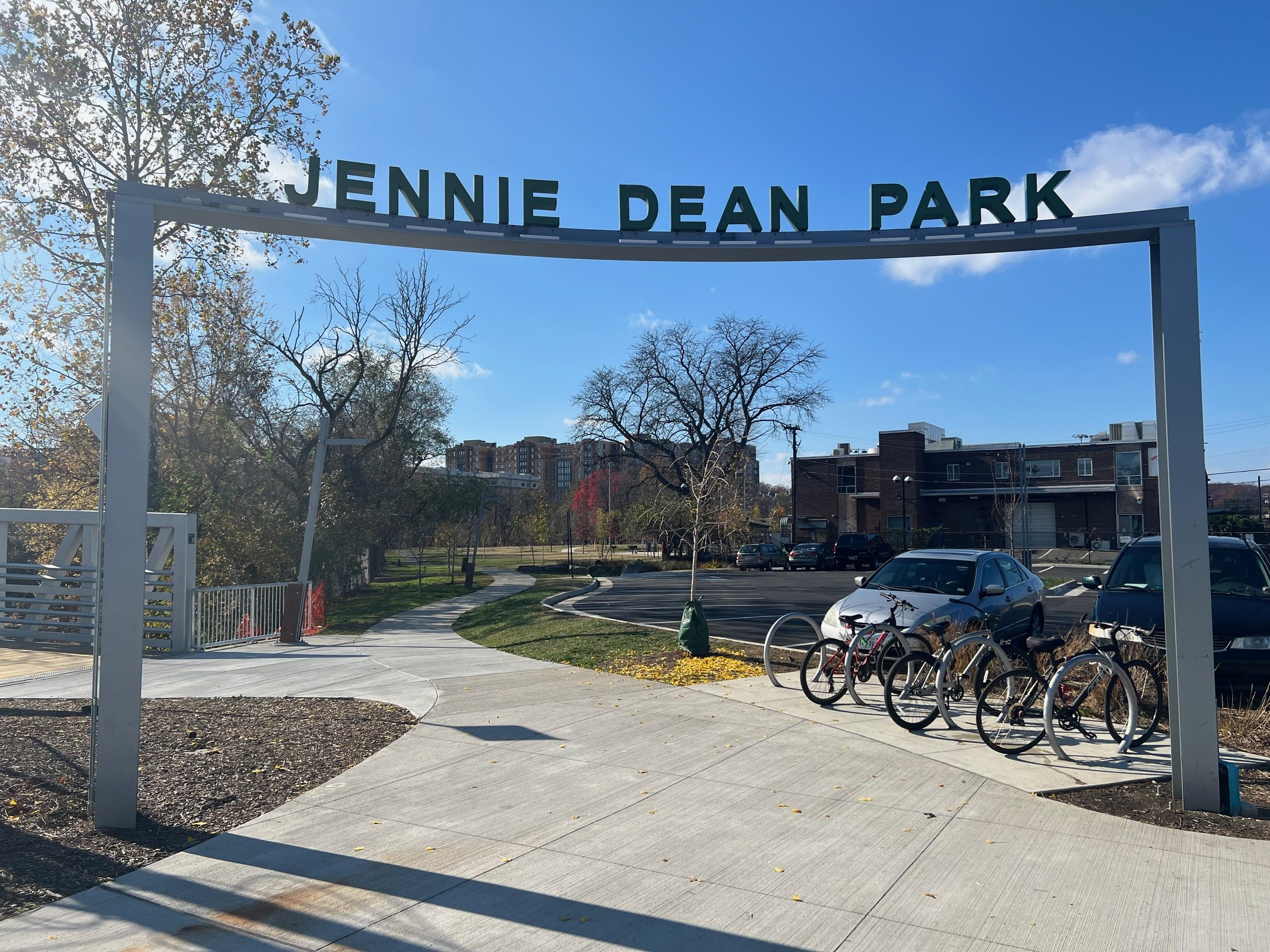
Jennie Dean Park overhead entrance sign Arlington VA

Jennie Dean died after suffering another stroke on May 3, 1913. She was buried beside Mt. Calvary Chapel that she had helped found. She is buried in the family plot. The Library of Virginia honored Dean in 2000 as one of its inaugural class of Virginia Women in History, and in 2013 as part of its Strong Men and Women series.

The Manassas Industrial School for Colored Youth continued for decades, and produced many teachers and other leaders of the African-American community. It was one of only two secondary schools for African Americans in Virginia unaffiliated with a religious denomination. The state Supreme Court eventually interpreted the 1902 state constitution's free public education requirement (through litigation sponsored by the National Association for the Advancement of Colored People (NAACP) as mandating public schools for African-American children. Thus, in 1938, the Manassas Industrial School formally became the only school for higher education of African-American students in five northern Virginia counties (Prince William, Fairfax, Arlington, Loudoun and Fauquier). After World War II, northern Virginia's population increased and localities built new schools for African-American students. Furthermore, the NAACP vehemently disagreed with requiring segregated schools, and began litigating against segregated schools, resulting in multiple decisions against such in the 1950s, including Brown v. Board of Education and a companion case from Virginia. The Manassas Industrial School closed in 1959, after Virginia governor J. Lindsay Almond acceded to decisions of the Virginia Supreme Court and a three-judge federal panel accepting the U.S. Supreme Court's decisions in Brown v. Board of Education. As Massive Resistance ended, the segregated facility was no longer needed.

In 1994, the Manassas Industrial School site was placed on the National Register of Historic Places, although the buildings had long since been torn down. It is now a 70-acre city park, with a memorial to Dean as founder, as well as (since 1995) outlines of the historic buildings and appropriate signage, a playground, ball fields, skate park, walking trails, and picnic and restroom facilities. Miss Dean's name now graces an elementary school next to the park. A 6-foot, bronze statue depicting Jennie Dean was unveiled in October 2020 in Prince William County, Virginia on the site of the former Manassas Industrial School for Colored Youth. The bronze piece was sculpted by Chris Hill.

Arlington, Virginia, also has a 22-acre park along Four Mile Run in its Green Valley neighborhood, a historically Black neighborhood, named after Jennie Dean.
