= Virginia State Route 659 (Loudoun and Prince William Counties) =

State highway in Virginia, United States

State Route 659
- Belmont Ridge Road, Gum Springs Road

Route information
- Maintained by VDOT
- Length: 17.37 mi (27.95 km)

Major junctions
- North end: Riverside Parkway in Leesburg
- SR 7 in Leesburg; SR 267 in Ashburn; US 50 in Stone Ridge; SR 620 near Conklin
- South end: SR 234 near Bull Run

Location
- Country: United States
- State: Virginia
- Counties: Loudoun, Prince William

Highway system
- Virginia Routes; Interstate; US; Primary; Secondary; Byways; History; HOT lanes

State Route 659 in Loudoun and Prince William Counties, Virginia is a secondary state highway. Otherwise known as Belmont Ridge Road north of Arcola, and Gum Spring Road to the south, the road is heavily used by commuters in the suburbs and bedroom communities of Loudoun County.

== Geography and layout ==
This approximately 17-mile (27 km) long north–south running road is mostly a four-lane (a few parts are two lanes), but heavily traveled, connection between State Route 7 and Prince William County. The road’s actual northern terminus is the Nation Conference Center just off the shores of the Potomac River, but for all practical uses of the road, the northern terminus is Route 7. The southern terminus is State Route 234 just past the Loudoun-Prince William County border. There are two Luck Stone quarries along Route 659, one outside the community of Belmont Green just southeast of Leesburg, and another just inside the Loudoun side of the county border near Route 234. The expansion of the southern quarry led to the relocation of a portion of the route in May 2012.

== History ==
The origin of the road's path is unclear (possibly the road had been a colonial byway, but no specific evidence is available to back up this assumption), but the road has been used by Loudoun County residents for years. The road had in previous years held a speed limit of 55 mph (89 km/h), but had been decreased to 45 mph (72 km/h) north of Arcola sometime in the last 20 years, and has always been 35 mph (56 km/h) through the town of Arcola. The speed limit remains 45 mph (72 km/h) south of Arcola on Gum Spring Road all the way to Route 234.

== Future improvements ==
The road has been scheduled for improvements under the Loudoun County Countywide Transportation Plan. Between Route 7 in Loudoun and Croson Lane, the road will have an ultimate condition of six lanes. The other parts of the road have an ultimate condition of four lanes. As of 2022, the road has been widened to four lanes from State Route 7 (Harry Byrd Highway) to State Route 621 (Evergreen Mills Road). Additionally, a stretch south of U.S. Route 50 to Marbury Estates Drive has also been widened to four lanes.

== Major intersections ==
County	Location	mi	km	Destinations	Notes
Prince William	Sudley Springs	0.00	0.00	SR 234 (Sudley Road)	
Loudoun		2.86	4.60	Ticonderoga Road (SR 613)	
Loudoun		4.58	7.37	Braddock Road (SR 620)	
Loudoun	Stone Ridge	6.30	10.14	Tall Cedars Parkway (SR 2200)	
Loudoun	Stone Ridge	6.60	10.62	US 50 (John S. Mosby Highway)	
Loudoun	Stone Ridge	Gap in route			
Loudoun	Stone Ridge	6.60	10.62	US 50 (John S. Mosby Highway)	
Loudoun		7.66	12.33	Evergreen Mills Road (SR 621)	
Loudoun	Gap in route				
Loudoun		7.66	12.33	Evergreen Mills Road (SR 621)	
Loudoun		10.00	16.09	Ryan Road (SR 772)	
Loudoun	Waxpool	11.69	18.81	Waxpool Road (SR 900)	
Loudoun	Ashburn	13.40	21.57	SR 267 Toll (Dulles Greenway) – Leesburg, Washington, D.C.	
Loudoun	Ashburn	13.84	22.27	Sycolin Road, Ashburn Farm Road (SR 625)	
Loudoun		14.31	23.03	Hearford Lane (SR 642)	
Loudoun	Lansdowne	16.49	26.54	SR 7 (Harry Byrd Highway) – Leesburg, Tysons Corner	
Loudoun	Lansdowne	17.37	27.95	Upper Belmont Place	End of state maintenance
1.000 mi = 1.609 km; 1.000 km = 0.621 mi
