= Cameron Nizialek =

American football player (born 1995)

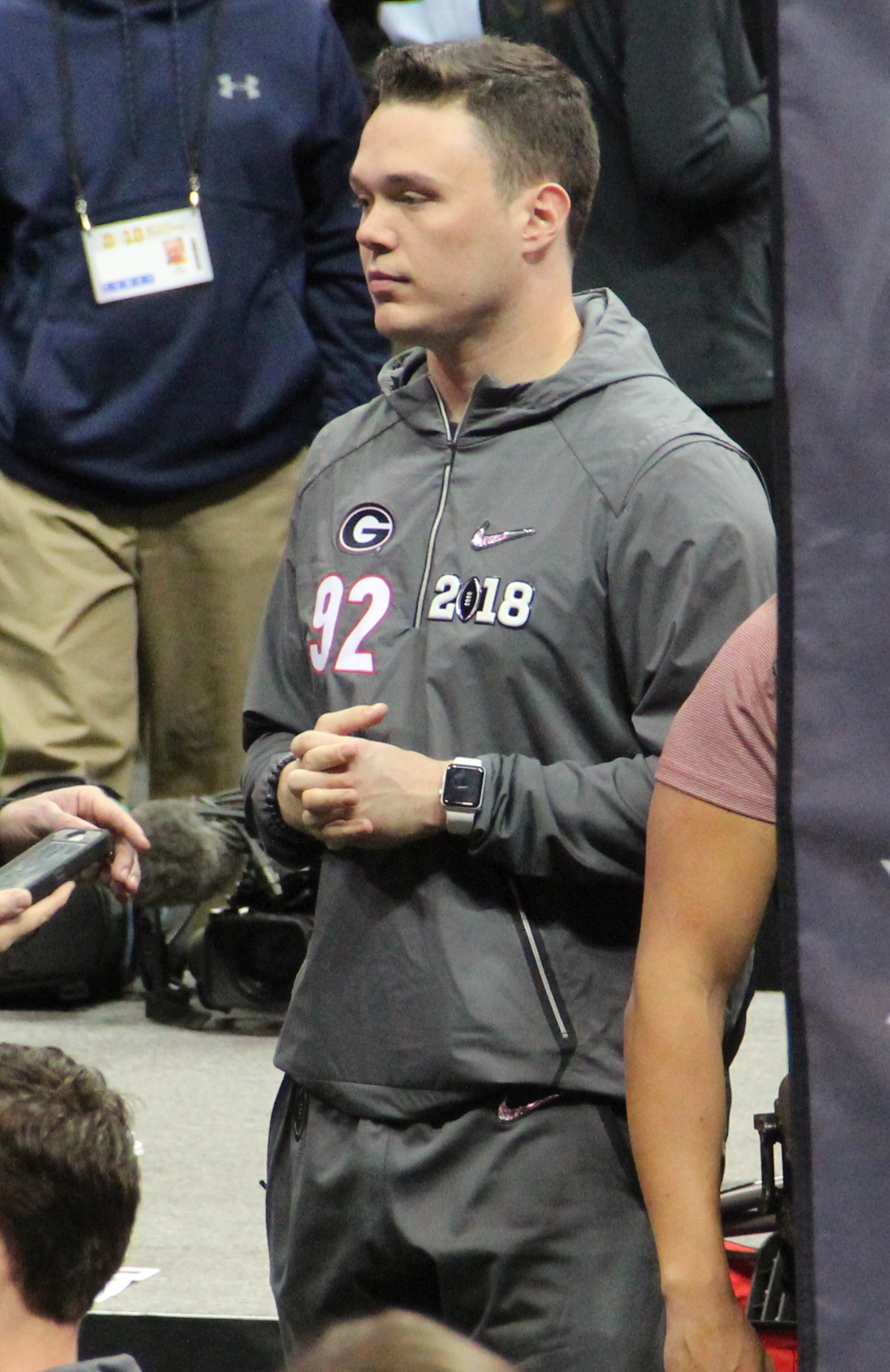
- Nizialek in 2018

No. 6, 9
- Position: Punter

Personal information
- Born: March 10, 1995 (age 31); Chantilly, Virginia, U.S.
- Listed height: 6 ft 2 in (1.88 m)
- Listed weight: 200 lb (91 kg)

Career information
- High school: Freedom (South Riding, Virginia)
- College: Columbia (2014–2016); Georgia (2017)
- NFL draft: 2018: undrafted

Career history
- Atlanta Legends (2019); Baltimore Ravens (2019)*; Jacksonville Jaguars (2020)*; Atlanta Falcons (2021); Pittsburgh Steelers (2021)*; Seattle Sea Dragons (2023)
- * Offseason or practice squad member only

Awards and highlights
- Second-team All-Ivy League (2016)

Career NFL statistics
- Punts: 18
- Punting yards: 817
- Punting average: 45.4
- Inside 20: 6
- Stats at Pro Football Reference

Cameron Joseph Nizialek (born March 10, 1995) is an American former professional football player who was a punter in the National Football League (NFL). He played college football for the Georgia Bulldogs and Columbia Lions.

== College career ==
Nizialek began his collegiate career at Columbia and did not play as a freshman. As a senior, he led the Ivy League with 44.8 yards per punt on 34 attempts and was named second-team All-conference. After the season, he enrolled at Georgia as a graduate transfer after considering offers from Clemson, Virginia Tech and South Carolina. Nizialek averaged 45 yards per punt on 61 attempts in his lone season at Georgia.

== Professional career ==
=== Atlanta Legends ===
Nizialek played for the Atlanta Legends of the Alliance of American Football. He served as the team's punter until the AAF ceased operations and averaged 47.4 yards per punt.

=== Baltimore Ravens ===
Nizialek was signed by the Baltimore Ravens on August 17, 2019. He was cut by the team during final roster cuts on August 30, 2019.

=== Jacksonville Jaguars ===
On December 22, 2020, Nizialek signed with the Jacksonville Jaguars’ practice squad. He signed a reserve/futures contract on January 4, 2021. He was waived on March 17, 2021.

=== Atlanta Falcons ===
Nizialek was signed to the Atlanta Falcons practice squad on September 6, 2020, before being released on October 1, 2020. Nizialek was re-signed by the Falcons on August 3, 2021. He was placed on injured reserve on October 5, 2021. He was released on November 9.

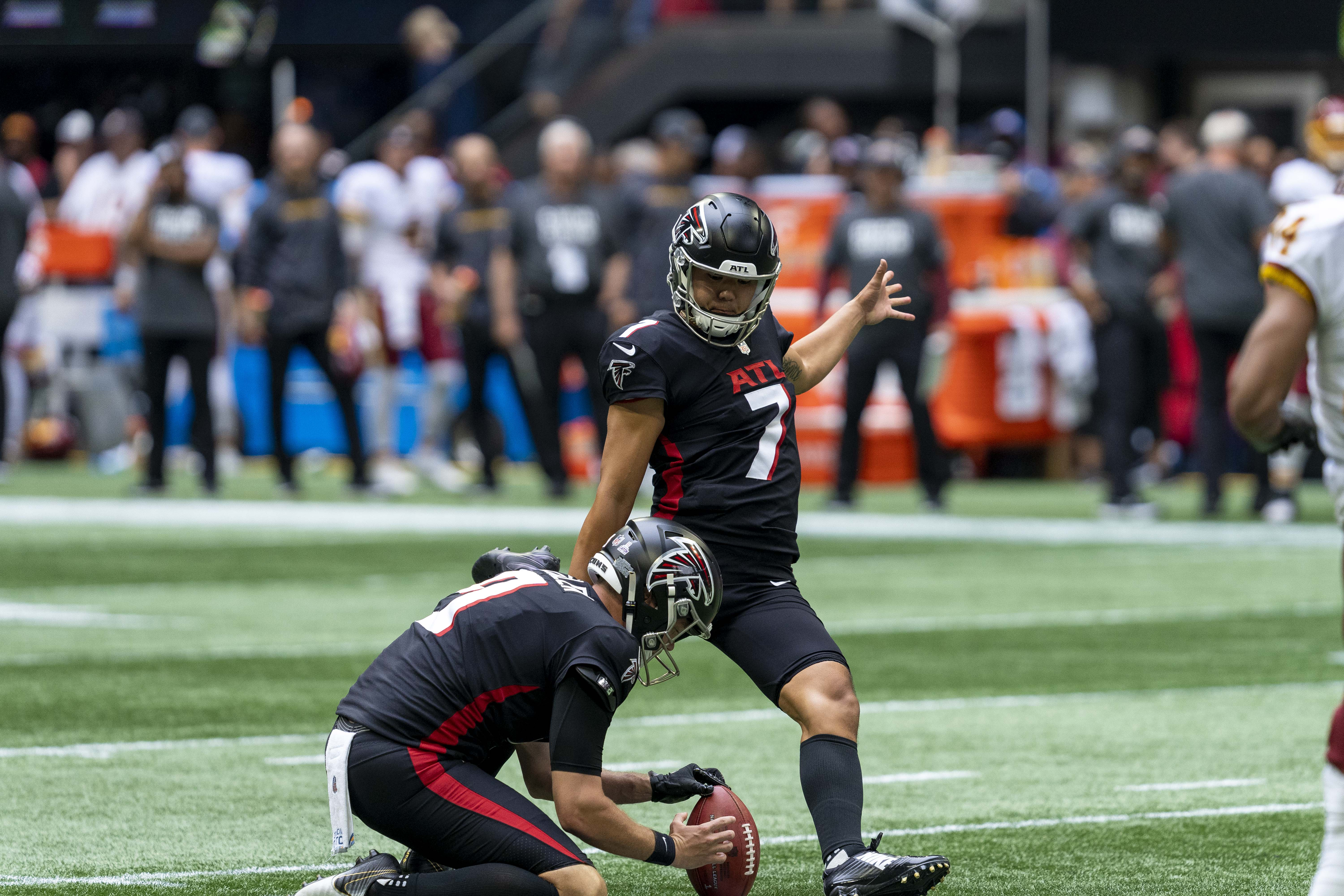
Nizialek (left) in 2021

=== Pittsburgh Steelers ===
On December 25, 2021, Nizialek was signed to the Pittsburgh Steelers practice squad. He was released on January 4, 2022. He signed a reserve/future contract with the Steelers on January 26, 2022. He was released on August 16, 2022.

=== Seattle Sea Dragons ===
On November 17, 2022, Nizialek was selected by the Seattle Sea Dragons of the XFL. The Sea Dragons folded when the XFL and USFL merged to create the United Football League (UFL).
