= Ben Williamson (baseball) =

American baseball player (born 2000)

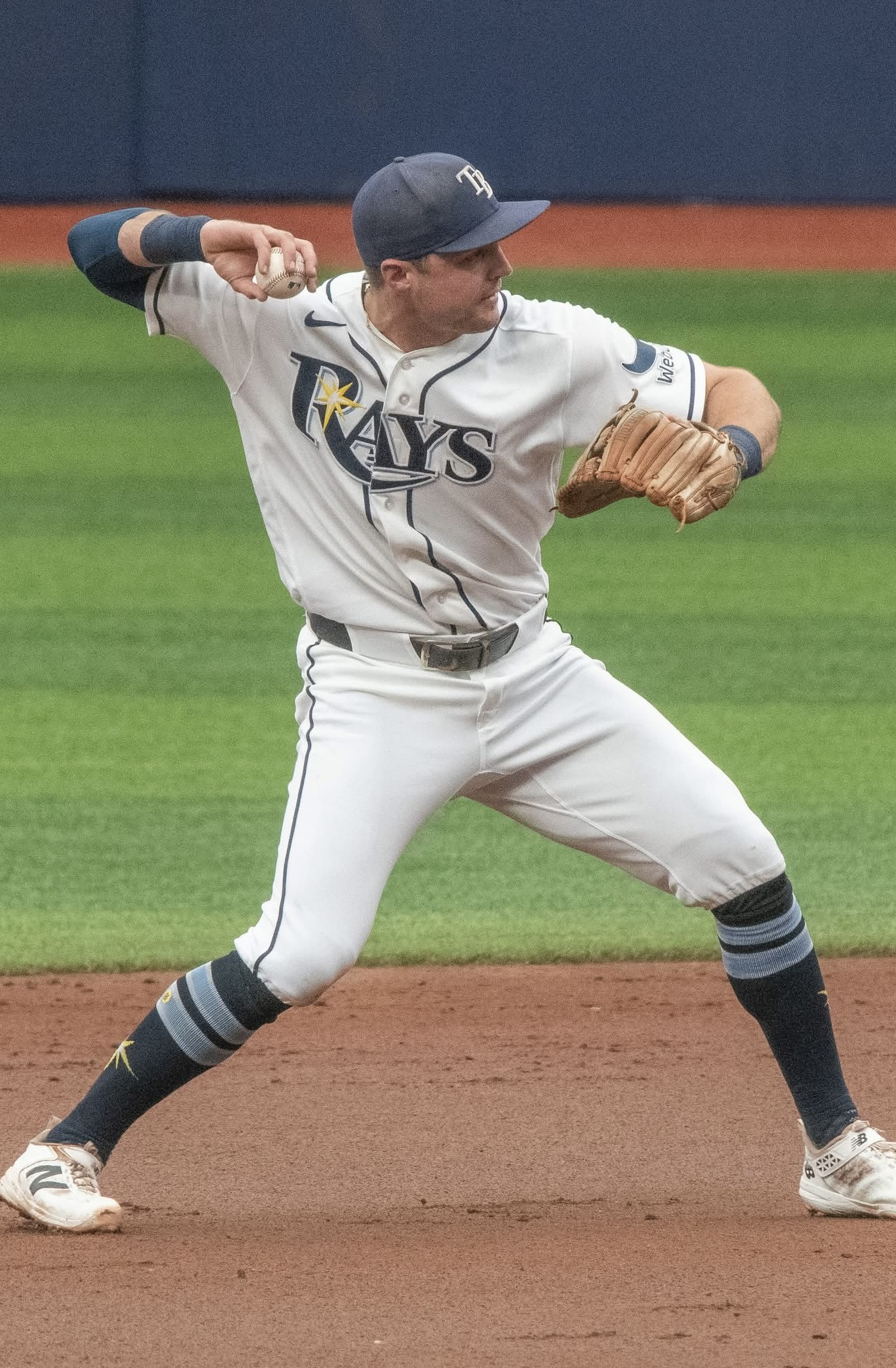
- Williamson with the Tampa Bay Rays in 2026

Tampa Bay Rays – No. 15
- Infielder
- Born: November 5, 2000 (age 25); Fairfax, Virginia, U.S.
- Bats: Right Throws: Right

MLB debut
- April 15, 2025, for the Seattle Mariners

MLB statistics (through 2026 season)
- Batting average: .245
- Home runs: 4
- Runs batted in: 47
- Stats at Baseball Reference

Teams
- Seattle Mariners (2025); Tampa Bay Rays (2026–present)

Benjamin Andrew Williamson (born November 5, 2000) is an American professional baseball infielder for the Tampa Bay Rays of Major League Baseball (MLB). He made his MLB debut in 2025 with the Seattle Mariners.

== Amateur career ==
Williamson attended Freedom High School in South Riding, Virginia. He won several awards in his senior season in 2019, including the conference and regional player of the year.

Williamson enrolled at the College of William & Mary and played college baseball for the William & Mary Tribe. He was named to the First Team All-Colonial Athletic Association (CAA) three consecutive years, from 2021 to 2023, the first player in school history with such a streak. He also won the CAA Defensive Player of the Year in 2022 after having a .975 fielding percentage. In the 2023 season, Williamson had a .391 batting average, .513 on base percentage, 12 home runs, and 49 runs batted in (RBIs), while also stealing 14 bases. For his performance on the year, he was named CAA Player of the Year. He played nine games of collegiate summer baseball with the Hyannis Harbor Hawks of the Cape Cod Baseball League prior to the 2023 MLB draft.

== Professional career ==
=== Seattle Mariners ===
The Seattle Mariners selected Williamson in the second round, with the 57th overall selection of the 2023 Major League Baseball draft. On July 14, 2023, Williamson signed with the Mariners for an under-slot deal worth $600,000. That year, he played in two games for the Arizona Complex League Mariners, then 10 games for the Single-A Modesto Nuts. He started 2024 with the High-A Everett AquaSox, where he hit .315 in 29 games. In May, he was promoted to the Double-A Arkansas Travelers, where he hit .273 with three home runs in 95 games. He had some difficulty adjusting to pitching in Double-A but remained a good defender.

Williamson began the 2025 season with the Triple-A Tacoma Rainiers, batting .281 with three doubles in 14 games. On April 13, 2025, the Mariners promoted Williamson to the major leagues for the first time. Two days later, he hit a single in his first major league plate appearance. Williamson was Seattle's starting third baseman until they re-acquired Eugenio Suárez on July 30. Williamson was sent down to Tacoma, where he finished the regular season. At the time of his demotion, he led American League (AL) third baseman in Defensive Runs Saved (DRS) but was near the bottom in on-base plus slugging. He finished his first MLB season batting .253/.294/.310. He ranked sixth among MLB third baseman in DRS despite playing in the minors for several months.

Williamson was added to the Mariners roster for the AL Division Series, possibly to fill in for Josh Naylor while he attended the birth of his first child, but did not play in the postseason. He was removed from the roster for the AL Championship Series.

=== Tampa Bay Rays ===
On February 2, 2026, the Mariners traded Williamson to the Tampa Bay Rays in a three-team trade in which the Mariners received Brendan Donovan and the St. Louis Cardinals received Jurrangelo Cijntje, Tai Peete, Colton Ledbetter, and two competitive balance round B picks in the 2026 MLB draft.

Williamson had a similar offensive performance in 2026, batting .238/.302/.318 with three home runs in 88 games. After exclusively playing at third for Seattle, he was primarily a middle infielder for the Rays. He hit a pinch-hit walk-off single off Shane Drohan in the 12th inning of Game 4 of the 2026 World Series.

== Personal life ==
Williamson grew up in Chantilly, Virginia. His mother was a college gymnast at James Madison University.
