= John Champe High School =

High school in Aldie, Virginia

Coordinates: 38.9321°N 77.5658°W

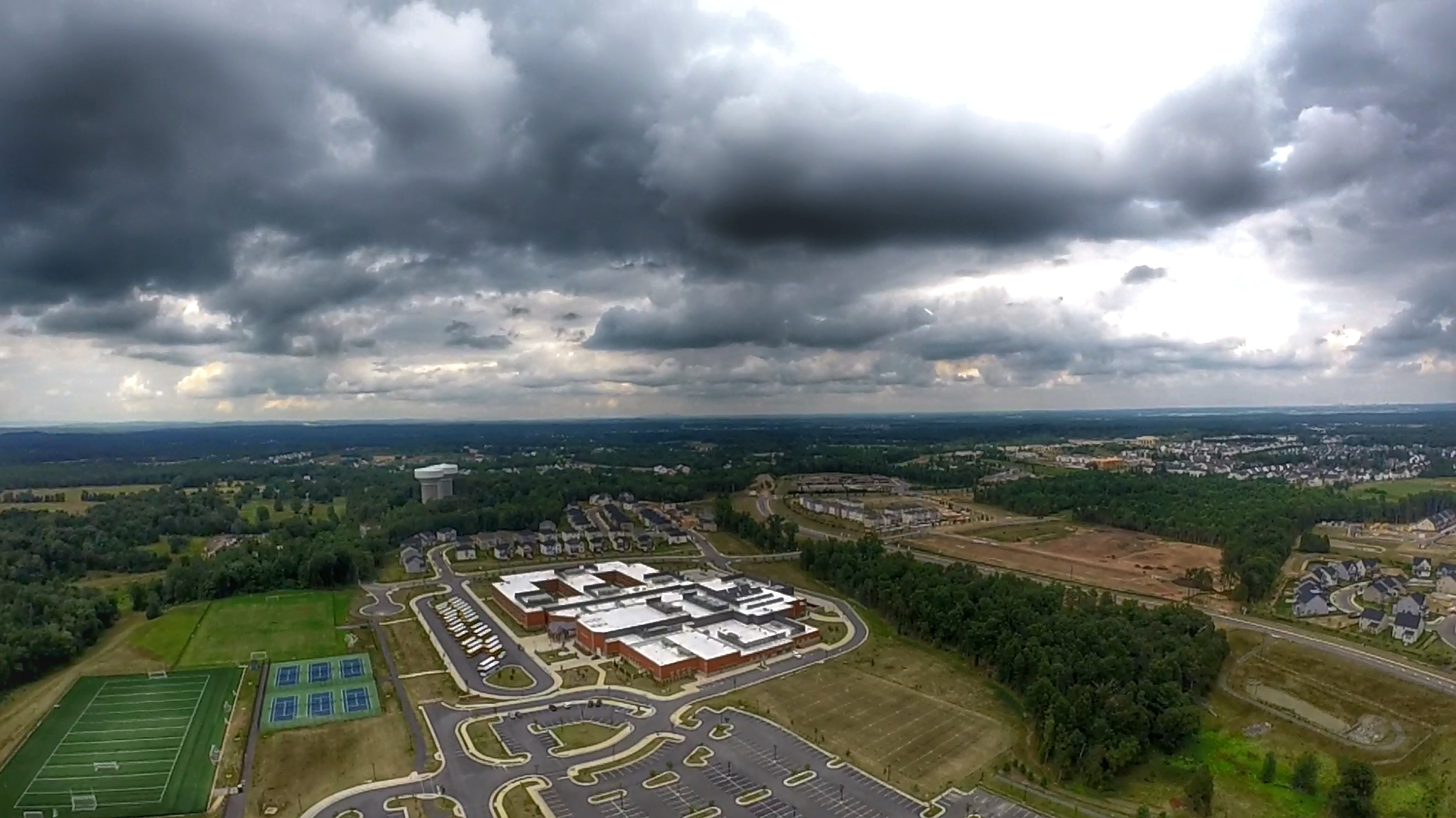
- Aerial view of John Champe High School and its athletic fields, August 2014

Location
- 41535 Sacred Mountain Street; Aldie, Virginia 20105

Information
- School type: Public High school
- Founded: 2012
- School district: Loudoun County Public Schools
- Principal: Melissa Sargent
- Grades: 9–12
- Enrollment: 1,588 (2022-2023)
- Language: American English
- Campus: Suburban / Rural
- Colors: Navy and Silver
- Mascot: Knight
- Nickname: Champe
- Communities served: Stone Ridge; Hartland; South Riding; East Gate
- Feeder schools: Gum Spring Middle School; Aldie Elementary; Arcola Elementary; Buffalo Trail Elementary; Goshen Post Elementary; Pinebrook Elementary; Liberty Elementary; Cardinal Ridge Elementary; Elaine E. Thompson Elementary; Henrietta Lacks Elementary; Hovatter Elementary
- Website: https://www.lcps.org/jch

John Champe High School is a public high school in Aldie, an unincorporated community in Loudoun County, Virginia, United States. The school was established in 2012. It is named after the revolutionary war hero John Champe who led an unsuccessful attempt to kidnap traitor Benedict Arnold. The campus is just south of U.S. Route 50 and 30 miles west of Washington, D.C. It is part of Loudoun County Public Schools and is located at 41535 Sacred Mountain Street.

== History ==
The school opened primarily to relieve Freedom High School of its overcrowding and to accommodate future development in the Dulles South area. Initially opening with an enrollment of only 609 students (partially due to the lack of a senior class its first year), John Champe's size has more than tripled in the years since.

The school temporarily shifted to an intermediate system in the 2018-2019 school year, with Willard Intermediate School serving 8-9th grade and Champe serving 10-12th grade. This ended when Lightridge High School opened its doors in the fall of 2020. In the 2018-2019 school year, John Champe shifted rising freshmen residing in the Brambleton Middle School attendance zones to Rock Ridge High School after a board meeting deciding to move those students temporarily for their ninth grade year instead of transferring to Willard intermediate school.

== Demographics ==
As of the 2022-2023 school year, the school was 51.5% male and 48.4% female. The school's racial demographics were: 43.3% Asian, 29.6% White, 12.4% Black, 8.8% Hispanic, 5.4% multi-racial, and 0.5% other races.

== Enrollment history ==
Student Enrollment History
School Year	Number of Students
2012-2013^	609^
2013-2014	960
2014-2015	1,251
2015-2016	1,515
2016-2017	1,813
2017-2018	2,119
2018-2019^^	1,656
2019-2020	No known data
2020-2021	No known data
2021-2022	1,689
2022-2023	1,588

^ During the 2012-2013 school year there was no senior class.
^^Freshmen class attended Willard Intermediate School until opening of Lightridge High School in 2020.

== Campus ==
The school sits on 97.76 acres just west of the Arcola and Stone Ridge communities.
