= Stone Ridge, Virginia =

- Census-designated place
- Location within Northern Virginia Location within Virginia Location within the United States
- Coordinates: 38°55′39″N 77°32′59″W
- Country: United States
- State: Virginia
- County: Loudoun

Area
  - Total: 2.61 sq mi (6.75 km^{2})
  - Land: 2.58 sq mi (6.69 km^{2})
  - Water: 0.019 sq mi (0.05 km^{2})
- Elevation: 365 ft (111 m)

Population (2010)
  - Total: 15,039
  - Density: 5,770/sq mi (2,228/km^{2})
- Time zone: UTC−5 (Eastern (EST))
  - Summer (DST): UTC−4 (EDT)
- ZIP code: 20105 (Aldie)
- FIPS code: 51-75702

Stone Ridge is a census-designated place in Loudoun County, Virginia, United States. Residences use Aldie mailing addresses, and it is near Washington Dulles International Airport. The population as of the 2020 census was 15,039. Stone Ridge is a Van Metre Homes planned, mixed-use community.

== Transportation ==
Stone Ridge is less than a mile south of U.S. Route 50, which connects the town to Lenah and Chantilly. Stone Ridge is crossed by five other major roads: Virginia State Route 2200 (Tall Cedars Parkway) and Virginia State Route 2625 (Stone Springs Boulevard) in the center, Virginia State Route 616 (Goshen Road), which forms the town's western border, Virginia State Route 659 (Gum Spring Road), which roughly forms the town's eastern border, and Northstar Boulevard; a major collector road, which is sightly west. U.S. 50 and SR 2200 roughly forms the northern border of Stone Ridge.

Stone Ridge is served by both the Village Center and Stone Springs Hospital bus stations, which serves and is the western terminus of the 88 route. The 88 route connects the town to settlements further east along U.S. Route 50, including South Riding. The eastern terminus of 88X bus route is the Wiehle-Reston East Metro Station.

== Geography ==
Stone Ridge is in southeastern Loudoun County, on the south side of U.S. Route 50 (John Mosby Highway) and to the west of State Route 659 (Gum Spring Road). Via U.S. 50, Stone Ridge is 31 miles (50 km) west of Washington, D.C., and 41 miles (66 km) southeast of Winchester. Leesburg, the Loudoun county seat, is 15 miles (24 km) north via SR 659 and SR 7, and Manassas National Battlefield Park is 9 miles (14 km) to the south. Stone Ridge is bordered to the north by Arcola and to the east by South Riding.

According to the U.S. Census Bureau, the Stone Ridge CDP has a total area of 2.6 square miles (6.7 km^{2}), of which 0.02 square miles (0.05 km^{2}), or 0.77%, are water. The south side of Stone Ridge drains south via Foley Branch toward Bull Run, which flows southeastward past the national battlefield to the Occoquan River. The north side of the community drains to Broad Run. The Occoquan River (southeastward-flowing) and Broad Run (northward-flowing) each run to the Potomac River.

== Schools and libraries ==
- Gum Spring Library (opened February 23, 2013)
- Lightridge High School
- John Champe High School
- Mercer Middle School
- Arcola Elementary School
- Pinebrook Elementary School
- Goshen Post Elementary School

== Demographics ==
Historical population
Census	Pop.	Note	%±
2010	7,214		—
2020	15,039		108.5%
U.S. Decennial Census; 2010 2020

Stone Ridge was first listed as a census designated place in the 2010 U.S. census.

=== Racial and ethnic composition ===
Stone Ridge, Virginia – Racial and Ethnic Composition (NH = Non-Hispanic) Note: the US Census treats Hispanic/Latino as an ethnic category. This table excludes Latinos from the racial categories and assigns them to a separate category. Hispanics/Latinos may be of any race.
Race / Ethnicity	Pop 2010	Pop 2020	% 2010	% 2020
White alone (NH)	3,583	5,677	49.67%	37.75%
Black or African American alone (NH)	700	1,599	9.7%	10.63%
Native American or Alaska Native alone (NH)	16	36	0.22%	0.24%
Asian alone (NH)	1,990	5,342	27.59%	35.52%
Pacific Islander alone (NH)	2	4	0.03%	0.03%
Some Other Race alone (NH)	17	92	0.24%	0.61%
Mixed Race/Multi-Racial (NH)	309	935	4.28%	6.22%
Hispanic or Latino (any race)	597	1,354	8.28%	9%
Total	7,214	15,039	100%	100%

=== 2020 census ===
As of the 2020 census, Stone Ridge had a population of 15,039. The median age was 35.0 years. 32.6% of residents were under the age of 18 and 6.3% of residents were 65 years of age or older. For every 100 females there were 94.4 males, and for every 100 females age 18 and over there were 91.8 males age 18 and over.

100.0% of residents lived in urban areas, while 0.0% lived in rural areas.

There were 4,622 households in Stone Ridge, of which 57.9% had children under the age of 18 living in them. Of all households, 69.3% were married-couple households, 10.0% were households with a male householder and no spouse or partner present, and 17.0% were households with a female householder and no spouse or partner present. About 12.9% of all households were made up of individuals and 2.7% had someone living alone who was 65 years of age or older.

There were 4,680 housing units, of which 1.2% were vacant. The homeowner vacancy rate was 0.3% and the rental vacancy rate was 3.7%.

=== Income and poverty ===
In 2020, Stone Ridge had a median household income of $153,628. Loudoun County, where it is located, has the highest median household income of any county in the United States.
