= Tai Peete =

American baseball player (born 2005)

St. Louis Cardinals
- Outfielder
- Born: August 11, 2005 (age 21); Riverdale, Georgia, U.S.
- Bats: Left Throws: Right
- Stats at Baseball Reference

Tai Jordan Peete (born August 11, 2005) is an American professional baseball outfielder in the St. Louis Cardinals organization.

== Amateur career ==
Peete grew up in Tyrone, Georgia and attended Trinity Christian School. In 2018, he represented the Southeast Region team in the 2018 Little League World Series and batted .409. As a junior at Trinity in 2022, he hit .400 with four home runs, five doubles, one triple and 12 RBI. He was named the 2023 Region 4-4A Player of the Year & 2023 Rawlings-Perfect Game Preseason All-Region First Team (Southeast) after his senior year when he batted .444 with 12 home runs, seven doubles, four triples and 36 RBI. Peete committed to play baseball at Georgia Tech.

== Professional career ==
Peete was selected by the Seattle Mariners in the Competitive Balance A Round with the 30th overall selection of the 2023 Major League Baseball draft. On July 18, 2023, he signed for an over-slot deal worth $2.5 million.

Peete started his professional career after signing with the Arizona Complex League Mariners, playing in 10 games with a .351 batting average. In August, he was promoted to the Modesto Nuts, where he hit .242 with 14 RBI over 14 games. With Modesto, Peete hit two home runs, the first of his career, both of which were grand slams. Peete returned to Modesto for the 2024 season, playing primarily shortstop. He played in 115 games and hit .269 with seven home runs, 71 RBI, nine triples, and lead the Nuts with 45 stolen bases. Peete played the 2025 season with the Everett AquaSox. Over 125 games, he hit .217 with 19 home runs, 63 RBI, and 25 stolen bases.

On February 2, 2026, the Mariners traded Peete to the St. Louis Cardinals in a three-team trade in which the Cardinals also received Jurrangelo Cijntje, Colton Ledbetter, and two Competitive Balance Round B picks in the 2026 MLB draft, the Seattle Mariners received Brendan Donovan, and the Tampa Bay Rays acquired Ben Williamson. Peete was assigned to the Peoria Chiefs to open the 2026 season. In early August, he was promoted to the Springfield Cardinals. He missed time during the season due to an illness that required hospitilization as well as a concussion, and completed a three game rehab assignment with the Florida Complex League Cardinals. Across a total of 66 games played, Peete batted .296 with 13 home runs, 56 RBI, and 16 stolen bases. After the season, he was selected to play in the Arizona Fall League with the Peoria Javelinas.
