= Manassas Industrial School for Colored Youth =

Former school in Virginia, US

- U.S. National Register of Historic Places
- Virginia Landmarks Register
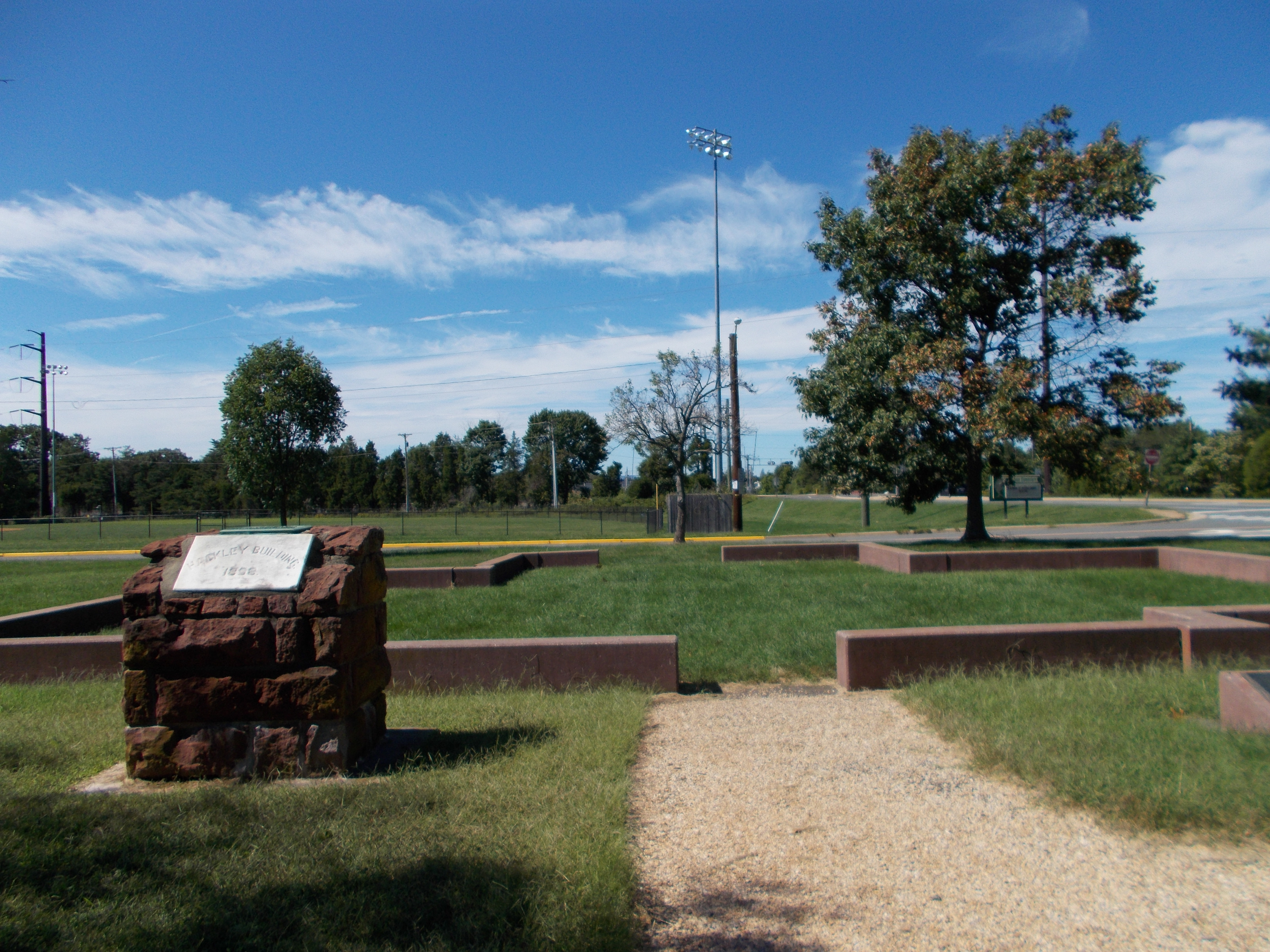
- Footprint of the building

- Location within Northern Virginia Location within Virginia Location within the United States
- Location: 9601 Wellington Road, Manassas, Virginia
- Coordinates: 38°44′46″N 77°29′22″W
- Area: 4.5 acres (1.8 ha)
- Built: 1893
- NRHP reference No.: 94000760
- VLR No.: 155-0010

Significant dates
- Added to NRHP: August 1, 1994
- Designated VLR: April 20, 1994

The Manassas Industrial School for Colored Youth, commemorated as the Jennie Dean Memorial Site, was a former school for African-American children in Manassas, Virginia. The current site name honors the school's founder, Jennie Dean, a charismatic ex-slave who believed in the value of vocational education for African-American youth of both sexes. The site was added to the National Register of Historic Places in 1994.

== History ==
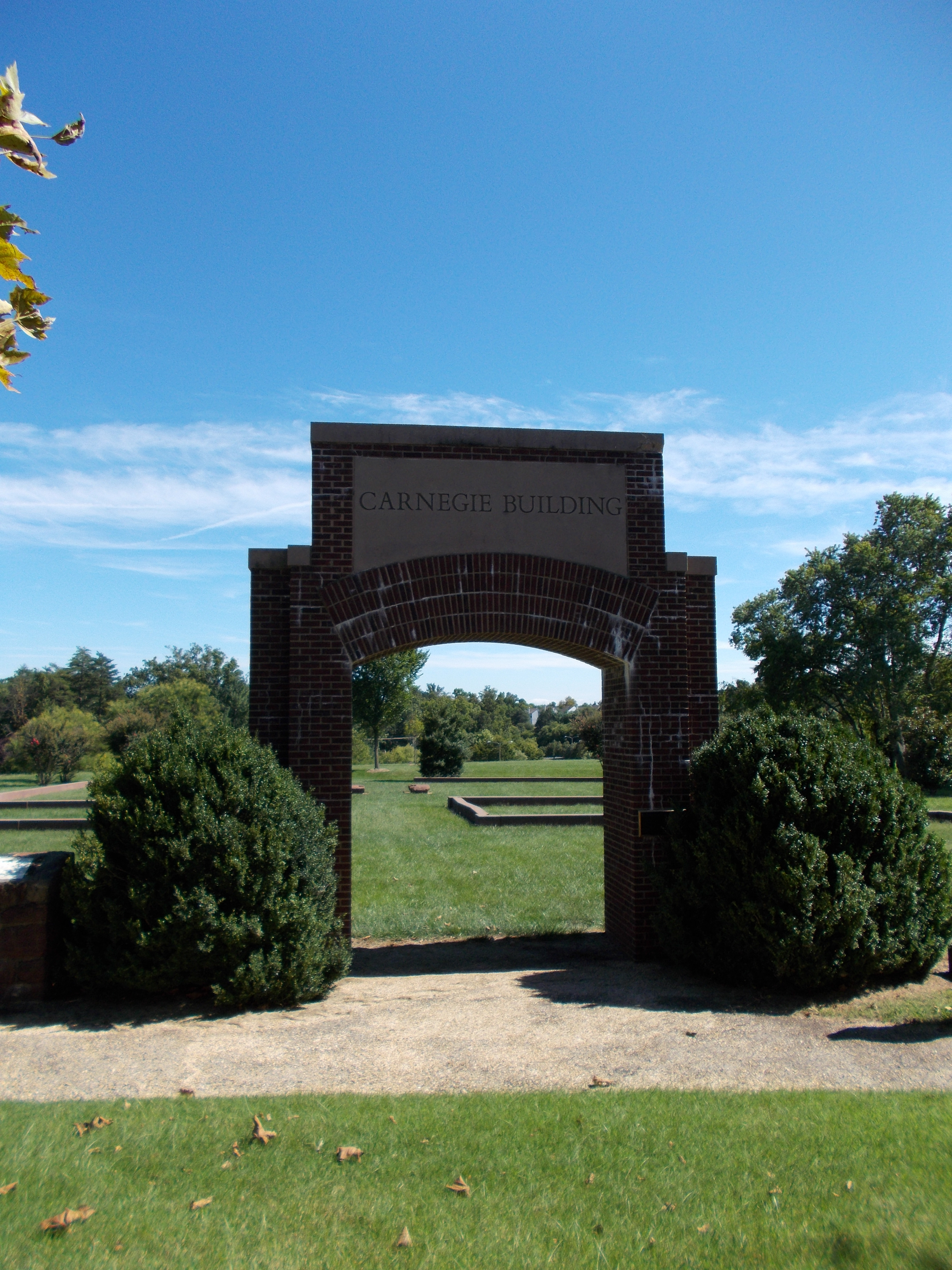
Surviving arch from the Carnegie Building

Jennie Dean and other African Americans (with assistance of sympathetic whites) established the school as a private residential institution in 1893.

In September 1894, Frederick Douglass visited the school and delivered a speech before its students, in which he cited its existence and the existence of other such institutions elsewhere as an example of social progress among African Americans since the end of slavery and the Civil War.

In 1938, after the Virginia Supreme Court finally interpreted the 1902 state constitution's free public education requirement as mandating public schools for African American children as well as white children (through litigation sponsored by the National Association for the Advancement of Colored People), a regional public school system took over operations and ran the school until 1959. Thus, for approximately two decades between 1938 until 1958, the Manassas Industrial School formally became the only school for secondary education of African American students in five Northern Virginia counties (Prince William, Fairfax, Arlington, Loudoun and Fauquier). After World War II, northern Virginia's population increased and the NAACP followed victories improving salaries for black teachers and allowing black children to receive bus rides to segregated schools by litigating directly against segregated schools. This led to several important court decisions against segregation in the 1950s and 1960s, including Brown v. Board of Education and a companion case from Virginia. Opponents of integration initially implemented a massive resistance strategy, which initially closed schools integrating even pursuant to court order, but eventually led to integrated schools. The Manassas Industrial School closed in 1959, after the Virginia Supreme Court and a three-judge panel of federal judges both separately ruled on January 19, 1959 (Lee-Jackson Day in Virginia) against the core Virginia Massive Resistance legislation.

The Manassas Industrial School buildings were demolished and a new elementary school with ball fields and park facilities constructed nearby. A series of historic markers was erected on the property and the site landscaped.

In September, 2015, the school's class roster for 1927 was discovered. The principal was William C. Taylor. Class colors were Red and Black. Class flower was a White Rose. Class roll was: William Henry Bailey, Garnetta Cornelia Battle, Ruth Estelle Clarke, Edward Albert Chambers, Naomi Agusta Dean, Edith Mae Gaskins, Harry Wilson Hall, Virginia Kelley Kenny, Paul Emanuel Rier, Adrian Francais Robinson, Mary Viola Roberts, Kathleen Lewisha Thomas, Rosa James Thomas, Tasco Delany Thomas, Hazel Belle Voorhees, William Henry Waddell, George Shermy woodson, Roberta Josephine Waters and Mary Synora Waller. Class motto was: Pick out your peak and climb.
