= Freedom High School (Loudoun County, Virginia) =

Public high school in Virginia

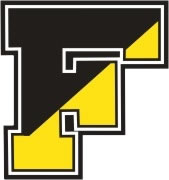

Location
- 25450 Riding Center Drive; South Riding, Virginia 20153; United States
- 38.9139°N 77.535°W

Information
- School type: Public, High School
- Founded: 2005; 21 years ago
- School district: Loudoun County Public Schools
- Superintendent: Aaron Spence
- Principal: Tania Brown
- Teaching staff: 141.65 (on an FTE basis) (2023-2024)
- Grades: 9–12
- Enrollment: 1,968 (2023–2024)
- Student to teacher ratio: 13.89 (2023-2024)
- Language: American English
- Campus: Suburban
- Colors: Black & Vegas gold
- Athletics conference: VHSL Class 5, Region 5C, Potomac District
- Mascot: Eagle
- Rivals: Champe High
- Newspaper: Uncaged
- Yearbook: Aquila
- Communities served: South Riding
- Feeder schools: Little River Elementary, Hutchison Farm Elementary, Liberty Elementary, Cardinal Ridge Elementary, J Michael Lunsford Middle School
- Website: www.lcps.org/o/fhs

Freedom High School, also known as Freedom-South Riding, is a public high school in South Riding, an unincorporated community in Loudoun County, Virginia, United States, 25 miles (40 km) west of Washington, D.C. The school is part of Loudoun County Public Schools.

== Administration ==
The current principal of Freedom High School is Tania Brown. She assumed leadership on July 1, 2025. Previously, Neelum Chaudhry served as the school's principal until 2025.

== History ==
Freedom opened in 2005, drawing its students from Broad Run High School, Loudoun County High School, and a small portion of Stone Bridge High School.

=== Overcrowding ===
Before the 2011–2012 school year the decision was made to hold part of the freshman classes at the then nearby middle school feeder, Mercer Middle School. The enrollment at Freedom had risen to over 2,000 students (note: the building capacity is 1,600). Because of the new middle school opening of J. Michael Lunsford this was possible. Since then, John Champe High School has opened to alleviate the overcrowding. Prior to the start of the 2015–2016 school year, the school was expanded by nearly 13,000 square feet.

== Academics ==
Freedom has earned several annual Virginia Index of Performance (VIP) awards, which, since 2007, recognize advanced learning and achievement and are awarded by the Governor of Virginia and the Virginia Department of Education.

Virginia Index of Performance Awards
Award	Year(s) Earned
Governor's Excellence Award	
Board of Education Excellence Award	2009, 2018
Board of Education Distinguished Achievement Award (Note: From 2008–2012, the VIP Board of Education Distinguished Achievement Award was known as the Competence to Excellence Award.)	2008, 2010, 2015, 2017, 2019

=== Fine arts ===
2010 Freedom Marching Band Season Accomplishments: USSBA Northern Virginia Regional, September 25, 2010 - First place overall in group 5A Best Overall Effect, Visual Performance, Percussion, and Color Guard

2009 Freedom Marching Band Season Accomplishments USSBA Northern Virginia Regional, Herndon High School, September 26, 2009 - 3rd place overall in group 4A - 1st place percussion

USSBA Blue Ridge Showcase, James Wood High School, October 17, 2009 - 1st place overall in group 4 - High Overall Effect - High Music

2014 Freedom Drumline Season Accomplishments:

Atlantic Indoor Association Circuit Championships at Freedom High School, March 29, 2014 - 4th Place Overall in PSO

WGI World Championships at Dayton, Ohio, April 10–12, 2014 -7th Place Overall in PSA

2011 Freedom Drumline Season Accomplishments: Atlantic Indoor Association Regional Contest at Broad Run High School, February 12, 2011 - 3rd Place Overall in PSO

Atlantic Indoor Association Regional Contest at Potomac Falls High School, February 19, 2011 - 2nd Place Overall in PSO

2010 Freedom Drumline Season Accomplishments: Atlantic Indoor Association Circuit Championships, Chesapeake, VA, March 27–28, 2010 - 2nd Place Overall and the AIA PSA Silver Medalists with a finals score of 90.488 - 1st Place Visual

Atlantic Indoor Association Regional Contest, C.D. Hylton High School, March 20, 2010 - 1st Place Overall in PSA

Atlantic Indoor Association Regional Contest, Thomas Jefferson High School of Science and Technology, March 13, 2010 - 1st Place Overall in PSA with a score of 86.05 - 1st Place Visual - 1st Place General Effect

Atlantic Indoor Association Regional Contest, Mills Godwin High School, March 6, 2010 - 1st Place Overall in PSA with a score of 81.20 - 1st Place Visual - 1st Place General Effect

2011 Freedom Winterguard Season Accomplishments - Freedom Winterguard AA Win at TJHS: Broken Hallelujah

Atlantic Indoor Association Regional Contest, Broad Run High School, February 12, 2011 - 1st place overall in CGSRA - Reclassified to CGSA3.

Atlantic Indoor Association Regional Contest, Potomac Falls High School, February 19, 2011 - 1st place overall in CGSA3 - Reclassified to CGSA2.

2010 Freedom Winterguard Season Accomplishments Atlantic Indoor Association Circuit Championships, Chesapeake, VA, March 27–28, 2010 - 1st place overall and the 2010 AIA CGSN Gold Medalists with a finals score of 83.45 - Took all captions.

Atlantic Indoor Association Regional Contest, C.D. Hylton High School, March 20, 2010 - 1st place overall in CGSN with a score of 72.1 - Won equipment, movement, and visual captions

Atlantic Indoor Association Regional Contest, Mills Godwin High School, March 6, 2010 - 1st place overall in CGSN with a score of 62.5

== Demographics ==
As of the 2023-2024 school year, Freedom High School's student enrollment was 38.2% Asian, 41.4% White, 8.6% Hispanic, 6.7% Black, 0.5% American Indian/Alaska Native, 0.05% Native Hawaiian/Pacific Islander, and 4.6% Two or More Races.

== Athletics ==
Freedom is a member of the Virginia High School League (Class 5, Region 5C, Potomac District) and competes as the Eagles in these varsity sports and activities:

- Boys: baseball, basketball, crew, cross country, football, lacrosse, track & field, soccer, swimming, tennis
- Girls: basketball, cheer, field hockey, gymnastics, lacrosse, soccer, softball, swimming, tennis, volleyball
- Co-ed: golf
- Unified Sports: basketball, track & field

Virginia state championships

- Basketball (girls): 2009, 2010
- Gymnastics: 2018, 2019
- Lacrosse (girls): 2016, 2018, 2019

== Notable alumni ==
- Griffin Burkholder, American baseball outfielder in the Philadelphia Phillies organization
- Cameron Nizialek, American football punter for the Seattle Sea Dragons, played college football at Georgia and Columbia
- Ben Williamson, Third baseman for the Tampa Bay Rays. Played baseball at the College of William and Mary
- Dominic Panganiban, animator and cartoonist known on YouTube as "Domics"
