= 2018 Little League World Series =

Children's baseball tournament

Tournament details
- Dates: August 16–August 26
- Teams: 16

Final positions
- Champions: (United States) Honolulu Little League, Honolulu, Hawaii
- Runners-up: South Seoul Little League, Seoul, South Korea

The 2018 Little League World Series was held from August 16 to August 26 at the Little League headquarters complex in South Williamsport, Pennsylvania. Eight teams from the United States and eight teams from around the world competed in the 72nd edition of the Little League World Series. Honolulu Little League of Honolulu, Hawaii, defeated South Seoul Little League of Seoul, South Korea, in the championship by a 3–0 score. It was the third championship for a team from Hawaii, having previously won in 2005 and 2008.

== Teams ==
Regional qualifying tournaments were held between June and August 2018.

United States	International
(Michigan) Grosse Pointe Woods, Michigan; Great Lakes Region; Grosse Pointe Woods-Shores Little League	(South Korea) Seoul, South Korea; Asia-Pacific and Middle East Region; South Seoul Little League
(New York (state)) Staten Island, New York; Mid-Atlantic Region; Mid-Island Little League	Gold Coast, Queensland; Australia Region; Gold Coast Little League
(Iowa) Des Moines, Iowa; Midwest Region; Grandview Little League	Surrey, British Columbia; Canada Region; Whalley Little League
(Rhode Island) Coventry, Rhode Island; New England Region; Coventry Little League	(Puerto Rico) Guayama, Puerto Rico; Caribbean Region; Radames López Little League
(Idaho) Coeur d'Alene, Idaho; Northwest Region; Coeur d'Alene Little League	(Spain) Barcelona, Spain; Europe and Africa Region; Catalunya Little League
(Georgia (U.S. state)) Peachtree City, Georgia; Southeast Region; Peachtree City American Little League	(Saitama Prefecture) Kawaguchi, Saitama; Japan Region; Kawaguchi Little League
(Texas) Houston, Texas; Southwest Region; Post Oak Little League	(Panama) Arraiján, Panama; Latin America Region; Vacamonte Little League
(Hawaii) Honolulu, Hawaii; West Region; Honolulu Little League	Matamoros, Tamaulipas; Mexico Region; Matamoros A.C. Little League

== Results ==
The draw to determine the opening round pairings took place on June 14, 2018.

=== United States bracket ===
Upper round 1	Upper round 2	Upper final	Final
August 16 – Game 2
(New York (state)) New York	5
August 19 – Game 14
Iowa	2
New York	2
August 16 – Game 4
Texas	1
Rhode Island	1
August 22 – Game 24 (F/5)
Texas	3
New York	0
August 17 – Game 6
Hawaii	10
Michigan	5
August 19 – Game 16
Idaho	4
Michigan	3
August 17 – Game 8 (F/11)
Hawaii	8
(Georgia (U.S. state)) Georgia	0	August 25 – U.S. championship
Hawaii	2	Hawaii	3
Georgia	0
Lower round 1	Lower round 2	Lower round 3	Lower final
August 20 – Game 18
August 18 – Game 10	Michigan	5	August 23 – Game 26
Iowa	9	Iowa	4	August 22 – Game 22	New York	3
Rhode Island	5	Michigan	3	Georgia	7
August 20 – Game 20 (F/9)	Georgia	4
August 18 – Game 12	Texas	6
Idaho	0	Georgia	7
Georgia	3

=== International bracket ===
Upper round 1	Upper round 2	Upper final	Final
August 16 – Game 1 (F/9)
Puerto Rico	2
August 19 – Game 13
South Korea	4
South Korea	5
August 16 – Game 3
Mexico	1
Mexico	3
August 22 – Game 23 (F/4)
Australia	2
South Korea	10
August 17 – Game 5 (F/5)
Japan	0
Spain	1
August 19 – Game 15
Japan	11
Japan	4
August 17 – Game 7
Panama	2
Panama	8	August 25 – International championship
Canada	3	South Korea	2
Japan	1
Lower round 1	Lower round 2	Lower round 3	Lower final
August 20 – Game 17
August 18 – Game 9	Panama	1	August 23 – Game 25
Puerto Rico	6	Puerto Rico	3	August 22 – Game 21	Japan	1
Australia	0	Puerto Rico	9	Puerto Rico	0
August 20 – Game 19	Canada	4
August 18 – Game 11 (F/10)	Mexico	4
Spain	1	Canada	6
Canada	2

=== Crossover games ===
Teams that lost their first two games played a crossover game against a team from the other side of the bracket that also lost its first two games. These games were labeled Game A and Game B. This provided teams who were already eliminated the opportunity to play a third game.

Game A
August 20 – Lamade Stadium (F/4)
Rhode Island	15
Australia	0

Game B
August 23 – Lamade Stadium
Idaho	5
Spain	0

=== Third place game ===
This consolation game is played between the runner-up of the United States championship and the runner-up of the International championship.

Third place game
August 26 – Lamade Stadium
Georgia	2
Japan	8

=== World Championship ===
Little League World Championship
August 26 – Lamade Stadium
South Korea	0
Hawaii	3

2018 Little League World Series Champions
Honolulu Little League
Honolulu, Hawaiʻi

== Champions path ==
The Honolulu LL reached the LLWS with an undefeated record in seven games. In total, their record was 12–0.

Round	Opposition	Result
Hawaiʻi State Tournament
Winner's Bracket Semifinals	Waipiʻo LL	4–2 (F/7)
Winner's Bracket Final	Hilo LL	5–2
Finals	Waipiʻo LL	11–0 (F/4)
West Regional Tournament
Winner's Bracket Opening Round	(Arizona) Sunnyside LL	7–3
Winner's Bracket Semifinal	(Utah) Dixie LL	8–2
Semifinal	(Nevada) Silverado LL	5–1
Finals	(California) Tri-City LL	11–2

== Notable players ==
Tai Peete, drafted by the Seattle Mariners in the 2023 Major League Baseball draft. (Peachtree City, Georgia)

== MLB Little League Classic ==
On September 29, 2017, Major League Baseball announced that the second MLB Little League Classic would be played on August 19, 2018, between the New York Mets and Philadelphia Phillies. The game was again played at BB&T Ballpark at Historic Bowman Field, with the Mets winning, 8–2.
