= Colton Ledbetter =

American professional baseball player (born 2001)

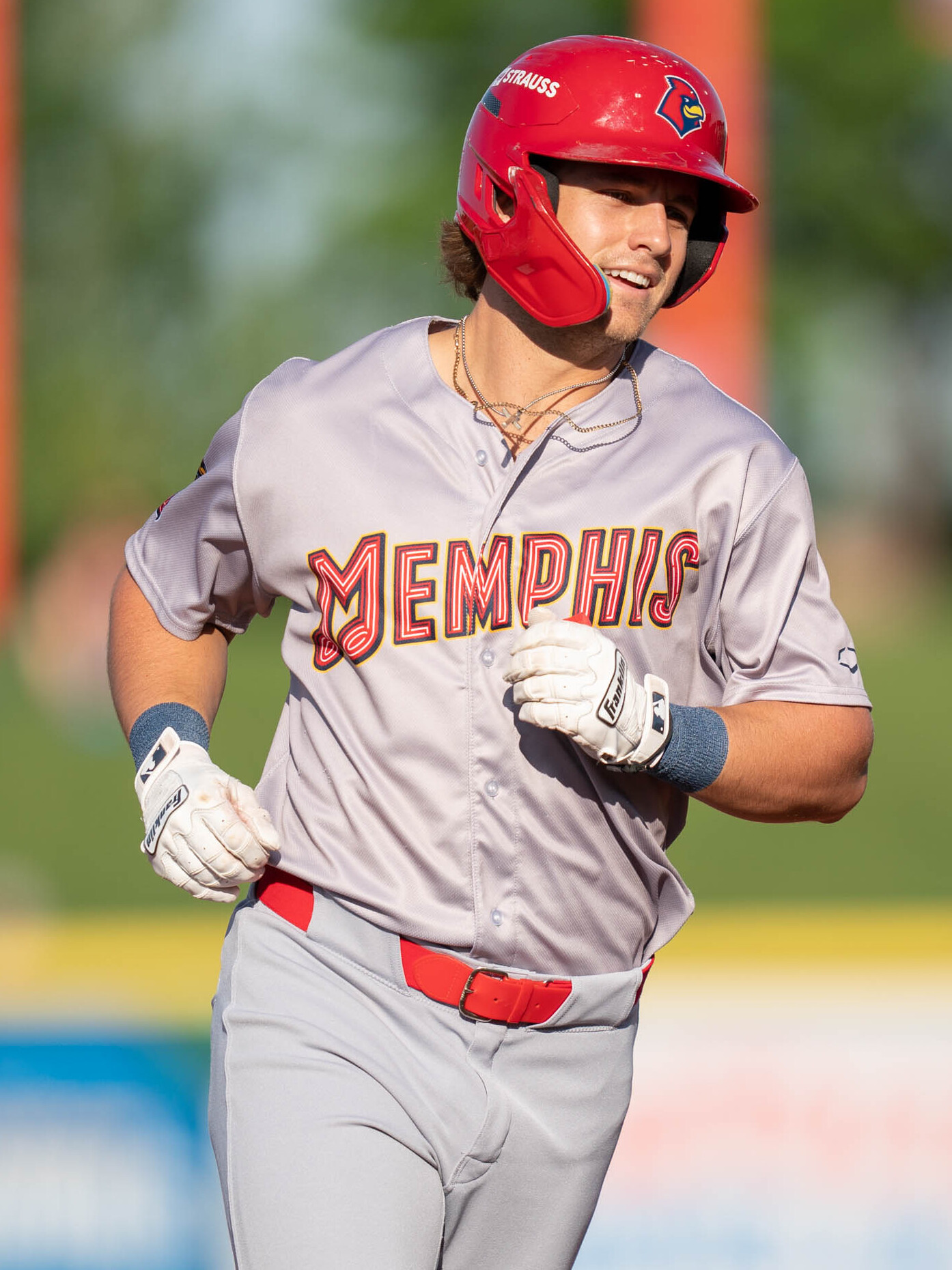
- Ledbetter with the Memphis Redbirds in 2026

St. Louis Cardinals
- Outfielder
- Born: November 15, 2001 (age 24); Hoover, Alabama, U.S.
- Bats: Left Throws: Right
- Stats at Baseball Reference

Colton Aaron Ledbetter (born November 15, 2001) is an American professional baseball outfielder in the St. Louis Cardinals organization.

== Amateur career ==
Ledbetter attended Spain Park High School in Hoover, Alabama, where he played baseball. As a junior in 2019, he was named to the All-State team after hitting .388 with seven home runs, 33 RBI, and 27 stolen bases over 34 games. During a shortened senior season in 2020, he batted .414 with four home runs, 14 RBI, and 17 stolen bases. He went undrafted in the shortened 2020 Major League Baseball draft, and enrolled at Samford University to play college baseball.

As a freshman at Samford in 2021, Ledbetter played in 31 games and hit .271 with eight doubles and five RBI. That summer, he played in the Great Lakes Summer Collegiate League for the Lima Locos with whom he batted .415 with eight home runs and 33 RBI. For Samford in 2022, he started 57 games and hit .318 with 16 home runs, 57 RBI, and 14 stolen bases. He played for the Newport Gulls of the New England Collegiate Baseball League over the summer, hitting .365 with 11 home runs, 47 RBI, and 11 stolen bases. After the season, he transferred to Mississippi State University. For the 2023 season with Mississippi State, he played in 53 games and hit .320 with 12 home runs, 52 RBI, and 17 stolen bases.

== Professional career ==
=== Tampa Bay Rays ===
The Tampa Bay Rays selected Ledbetter in the second round, with the 55th overall pick, in the 2023 Major League Baseball draft. On July 21, 2023, he signed with the Rays for an under-slot bonus of $1,297,500.

Ledbetter made his professional debut with the Florida Complex League Rays and was quickly promoted to the Charleston RiverDogs. Over 21 games for the season, he hit .274 with two home runs and 12 RBI. Ledbetter was assigned to the Bowling Green Hot Rods for the 2024 season, batting .273 with 16 home runs, 65 RBI, and 34 stolen bases over 109 games. He was assigned to the Montgomery Biscuits for the 2025 season. Over 123 games, Ledbetter hit .265 with seven home runs, 49 RBI, and 37 stolen bases.

=== St. Louis Cardinals ===
On February 2, 2026, the Rays traded Ledbetter to the St. Louis Cardinals in a three-team trade in which the Cardinals also received Tai Peete, Jurrangelo Cijntje, and two Competitive Balance Round B picks in the 2026 MLB draft, the Rays acquired Ben Williamson, and the Seattle Mariners received Brendan Donovan. He was assigned to the Memphis Redbirds for the 2026 season and batted .269 with 13 home runs, 55 RBI, and 26 stolen bases across 113 games.
