= Brendan Donovan =

American baseball player (born 1997)

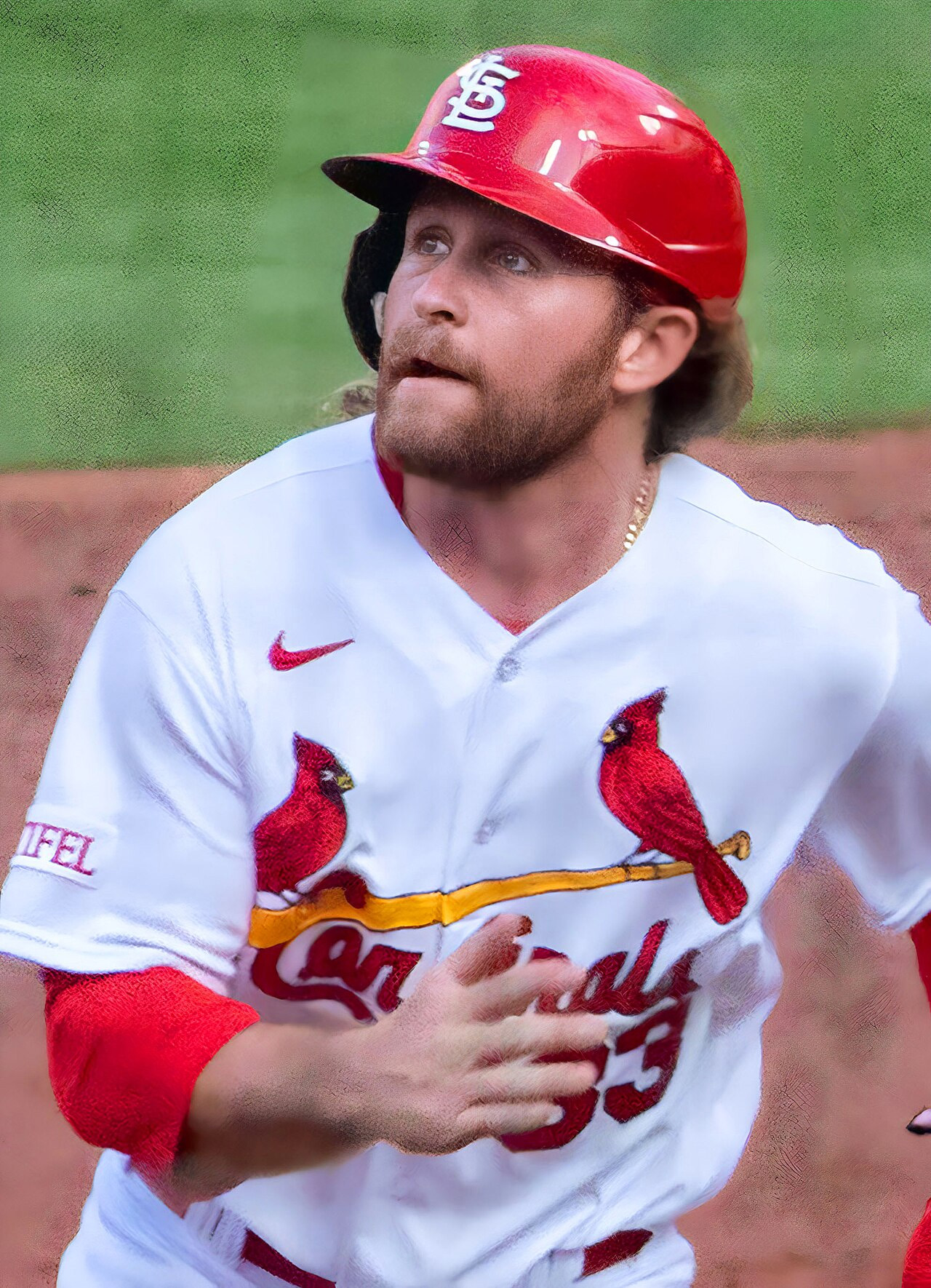
- Donovan with the Cardinals in 2024

Seattle Mariners – No. 33
- Utility player
- Born: January 16, 1997 (age 29); Würzburg, Germany
- Bats: Left Throws: Right

MLB debut
- April 25, 2022, for the St. Louis Cardinals

MLB statistics (through 2026 season)
- Batting average: .282
- Home runs: 43
- Runs batted in: 217
- Stats at Baseball Reference

Teams
- St. Louis Cardinals (2022–2025); Seattle Mariners (2026–present)

Career highlights and awards
- All-Star (2025); Gold Glove Award (2022)

Brendan Michael Donovan (born January 16, 1997) is an American professional baseball utility player for the Seattle Mariners of Major League Baseball (MLB). He has previously played in MLB for the St. Louis Cardinals.

Born in Würzburg, Germany, and raised in Enterprise, Alabama, Donovan played college baseball at the University of South Alabama before the Cardinals selected him in the seventh round of the 2018 MLB draft. He was a part of their minor league system before making his MLB debut in 2022, becoming a consistent member of their lineup as a utility player. Following the conclusion of his rookie season, he was named the first-ever recipient of the National League Gold Glove Award for a utility player and was also a finalist for National League Rookie of the Year. In 2025, Donovan was named to his first All-Star game. Prior to the 2026 season, the Cardinals traded Donovan to the Mariners.

== Amateur career ==
Donovan attended and played baseball at Enterprise High School in Enterprise, Alabama, where he batted .467 with four home runs, 44 runs batted in (RBIs), 17 doubles, and six triples as a senior in 2015. He attended the University of South Alabama and played college baseball for the South Alabama Jaguars. In 2017, he played collegiate summer baseball with the Hyannis Harbor Hawks of the Cape Cod Baseball League. In 2018, his junior year, he batted .302 with five home runs and 55 RBIs over 57 games.

== Professional career ==
=== St. Louis Cardinals ===
==== Minor leagues ====
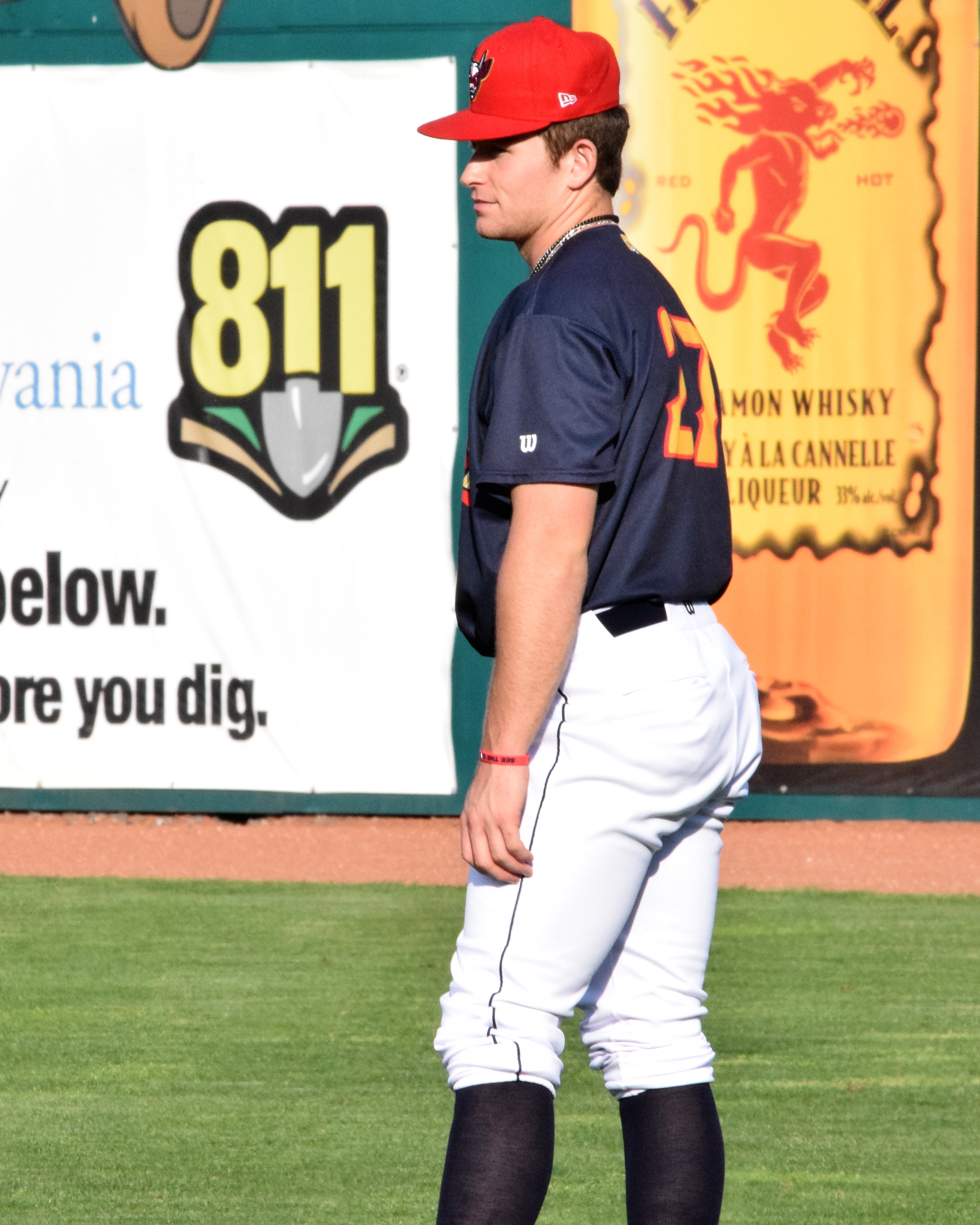
Donovan in 2018

The St. Louis Cardinals selected Donovan in the seventh round of the 2018 Major League Baseball draft. He signed with St. Louis and made his professional debut with the State College Spikes of the Low-A New York–Penn League, playing in four games. He spent most of the 2019 season with the Peoria Chiefs of the Single-A Midwest League and played in one game with the Memphis Redbirds of the Triple-A Pacific Coast League, batting .268 with eight home runs and 53 RBI over 114 games for the season.

Donovan did not play for a minor league team during the 2020 season, which was cancelled due to the COVID-19 pandemic. He started 2021 with Peoria (now members of the High-A Central) before being promoted to the Springfield Cardinals of the Double-A Central in early June and to Memphis (now members of the Triple-A East) in mid-August. Over 108 games between the three teams, he slashed .304/.399/.455 with 12 home runs and 66 RBI. Donovan was selected to play in the Arizona Fall League for the Glendale Desert Dogs after the season where he was named to the Fall Stars Game. On November 19, 2021, the Cardinals added Donovan to their 40-man roster to protect him from the Rule 5 draft. Donovan returned to Memphis to begin the 2022 season.

==== Major leagues ====
On April 25, 2022, Donovan was promoted to the major leagues. He made his MLB debut that night against the New York Mets as a pinch runner and scored on a single by Tyler O'Neill. The next night, Donovan made his first major league start; he went 0-for-2 and was hit by a pitch in a 0–3 loss to the Mets. On April 28, Donovan recorded his first career hit: a pinch-hit single against fellow rookie Tyler Holton of the Arizona Diamondbacks. On May 10, he hit his first MLB home run, off of Dillon Tate of the Baltimore Orioles. On September 22, Donovan recorded the 100th hit of his career with a grand slam off of Nick Martinez of the San Diego Padres. The Cardinals went on to win the game 5–4.

Donovan finished his rookie season batting .281/.394/.379 with five home runs, 45 RBI, and 21 doubles over 126 games. Defensively, he played left field, right field, first base, second base, shortstop, and third base, and was named the first ever recipient of the National League Gold Glove Award for a utility player. He was named a finalist for the National League Rookie of the Year Award, alongside Michael Harris II and Spencer Strider. He finished in third place as Harris won the award.

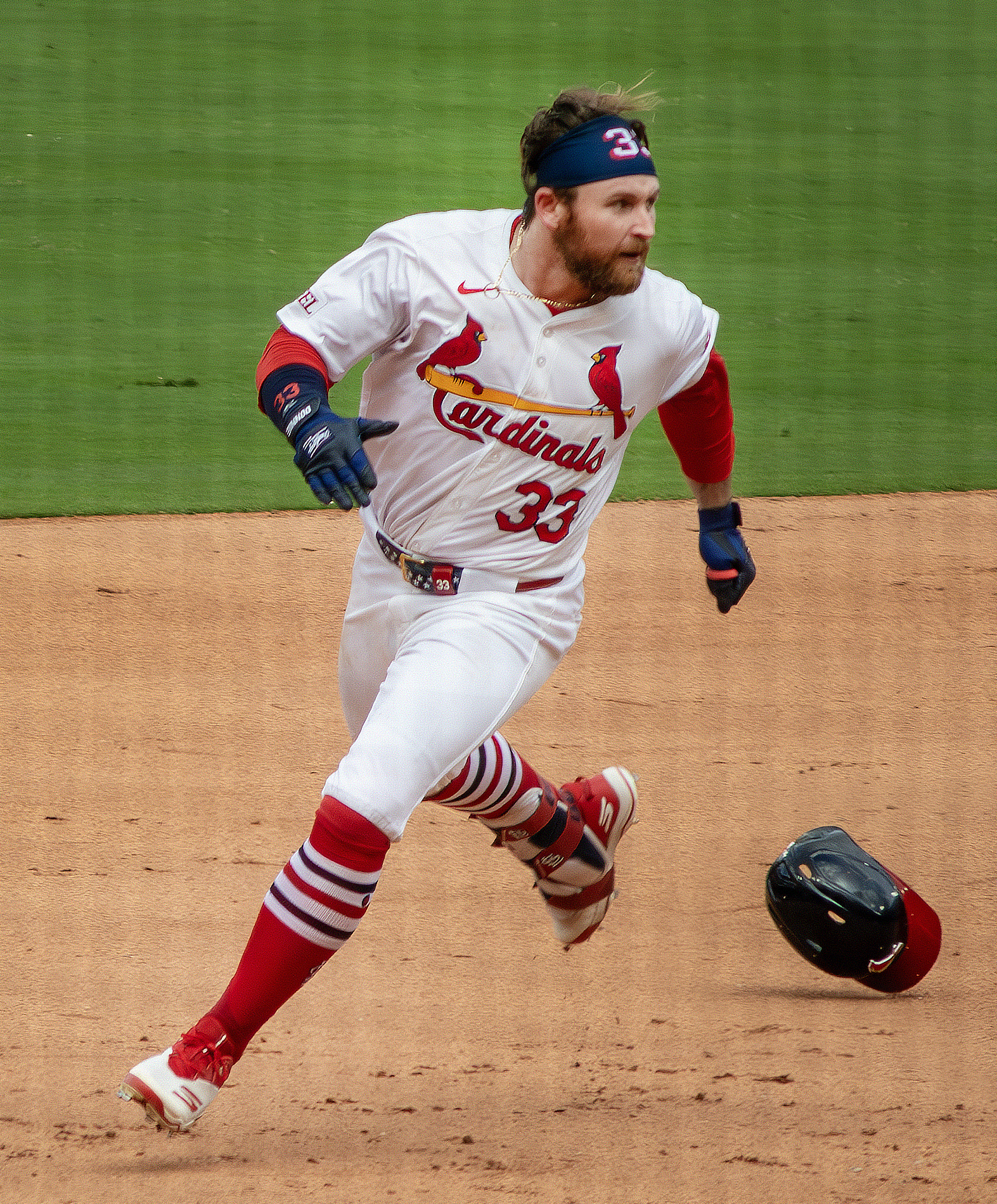
Donovan in 2024

In 2023, Donovan played in 95 games for the Cardinals. In 327 at bats, he batted .281/.362/.419 with 11 home runs and 34 RBI. On August 2, 2023, it was announced that Donovan would undergo season–ending surgery to repair a flexor tendon injury in his throwing arm.

In 2024, Donovan batted .278/.342/.417 with 14 home runs and 73 RBI in 153 games. That offseason, Donovan went to salary arbitration with the Cardinals in his first year of eligibility. Donovan filed at $3.3 million with the Cardinals offering $2.85 million. Donovan lost his arbitration case.

Donovan made his first career appearance in the MLB All-Star Game in 2025. He went 2-for-3 with two singles during the game, which the National League won following the first ever home run swing-off. In 118 appearances for St. Louis on the year, Donovan slashed .287/.353/.422 with 10 home runs and 50 RBI. On October 7, he underwent surgery to repair a sports hernia.

=== Seattle Mariners ===
On February 2, 2026, the Cardinals traded Donovan to the Seattle Mariners in a three-team trade in which the Cardinals received Jurrangelo Cijntje, Tai Peete, Colton Ledbetter, and two Competitive Balance Round B picks in the 2026 MLB draft, and the Tampa Bay Rays acquired Ben Williamson.

== Personal life ==
Donovan was born in Würzburg, Germany, when his father was stationed overseas, and represented the Germany national baseball team in the 2023 World Baseball Classic qualification. He married his wife Aly in 2022 and the couple welcomed a daughter in March 2024. Donovan is a Christian.
