= Jurrangelo Cijntje =

Curaçaoan baseball player (born 2003)

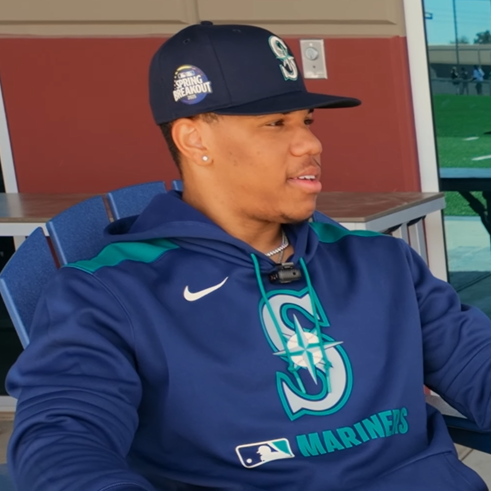
- Cijntje with the Seattle Mariners in 2025

St. Louis Cardinals
- Pitcher
- Born: May 31, 2003 (age 23); The Hague, Netherlands
- Bats: Switch Throws: Switch
- Stats at Baseball Reference

Jean Michael "Jurrangelo" Cijntje (/seɪndʒɑː/ SAIN-juh, born May 31, 2003), also nicknamed "Loo", is a Curaçaoan professional baseball pitcher in the St. Louis Cardinals organization. He is a switch pitcher, having the rare ability to pitch proficiently with both his right and left arm. He was chosen with the 15th overall pick in the 2024 Major League Baseball draft by the Seattle Mariners.

== Amateur career ==
Cijntje was born in the Netherlands and grew up primarily in Willemstad, Curaçao. He switch pitched and played shortstop for Willemstad in the 2016 Little League World Series. Cijntje played second base and batted second for the Netherlands under-15 team at the 2018 U-15 Baseball World Cup in Panama. He had a 1.076 on-base plus slugging and 6 RBI while committing two errors in eight games at the tournament. He also participated in the Reviving Baseball in Inner Cities (RBI) program in Curaçao.

Cijntje moved to Miami when he was 16 years old, where he lived with three older cousins who had played college baseball at Florida National University. He attended Champagnat Catholic School in Hialeah, Florida, where he played baseball as both a switch pitcher and switch hitter. His high school record was 7–6 with a 2.32 earned run average (ERA), striking out 166 batters in 81 innings. He committed to play for Mississippi State University before his senior season. He enrolled there after not signing with the Milwaukee Brewers, who selected him in the 18th round of the 2022 MLB draft as a shortstop. Because he threw right handed as an infielder, his right throwing arm became stronger than his left.

Cijntje began his freshman season with the Bulldogs as a mid-week starting pitcher. In his first collegiate start, he struck out seven Louisiana–Monroe batters, six while pitching right-handed and one as a lefty, while allowing one hit and one walk over four innings. He finished the season with a 3–5 record and 8.10 ERA in 14 games, 13 of the starts. He had 63 strikeouts in 50 innings pitched.

As a sophomore in 2024, Cijntje was named a second-team All American by the National Collegiate Baseball Writers Association and Perfect Game and was named to the South All-Region first team by the American Baseball Coaches Association. He finished the season with an 8–2 record and 3.67 ERA over 16 starts. He had 113 strikeouts in 90 2/3 innings pitched. Cijntje pitched primarily as a righty in 2024, not throwing a pitch left-handed for the final month of the season. Mississippi State pitching coach Justin Parker said Cijntje would often forego the platoon advantage and pitch with his right arm to left-handed batters to improve his consistency. Parker said Cijntje had higher velocity and better command with his right arm but induced more groundballs as a lefty.

== Professional career ==
=== Seattle Mariners ===
The Seattle Mariners drafted Cijntje with the 15th overall pick in the 2024 Major League Baseball draft on July 14, 2024. He signed a $4.88 million contract with the Mariners on July 16. Cijntje did not pitch for the Mariners in 2024, participating in a training camp at the team's Arizona complex in October.

Cijntje's first competitive professional appearance was in a 2025 MLB Spring Breakout game. He threw his first pitch with his left hand, retiring fellow prospect Travis Bazzana, before switching to the right side for the rest of his two-inning outing. Entering the 2025 season, he was ranked as a top 100 prospect by Baseball Prospectus and FanGraphs, joining Baseball America's top 100 prospects list in April. He began the season with the High-A Everett AquaSox. On May 18, he took a no-hitter into the sixth inning in a win over the Vancouver Canadians, pitching left handed to only three batters. He won the Northwest League's Pitcher of the Week award for that performance. Early in the season, he threw three left-handed relief appearances, allowing nine runs in three innings. Cijntje pitched a scoreless inning in the 2025 All-Star Futures Game, throwing left handed to one batter. On August 3, Cijntje was promoted to the Double-A Arkansas Travelers. He finished his first professional season with a 5–7 record, 3.99 ERA, and 120 strikeouts in 108 1/3 innings.

Before the 2026 season, MLB.com ranked Cijntje as the 91st best prospect.

=== St. Louis Cardinals ===
On February 2, 2026, the Mariners traded Cijntje to the St. Louis Cardinals in a three-team trade in which the Cardinals also received Tai Peete, Colton Ledbetter, and two Competitive Balance Round B picks in the 2026 MLB draft, the Seattle Mariners received Brendan Donovan, and the Tampa Bay Rays acquired Ben Williamson. He was assigned to the Double-A Springfield Cardinals to begin the 2026 season and was promoted to the Triple-A Memphis Redbirds in July. Across 28 starts between both teams, Cijntje had a 5–9 record, a 4.87 ERA, and 162 strikeouts in 133 innings.

== Personal life ==
Cijntje's father, Mechangelo, played baseball professionally in the Netherlands as a catcher. Cijntje is naturally left-handed and began throwing with his right hand when he was six years old to mimic his father.

Cijntje is friends with Ozzie Albies. As a child, Cijntje's favorite baseball player was Andruw Jones, who is also Curaçaoan. In high school, Cijntje said his favorite MLB pitchers were lefty Clayton Kershaw and righty Marcus Stroman, who scouts have compared him to given their similar size.

Cijntje can speak fluent English, Spanish, Dutch, and Papiamento, though he has not spoken Dutch much since moving to the United States.
