= Conklin, Virginia =

Former community in Virginia, United States

Conklin
- Unincorporated area
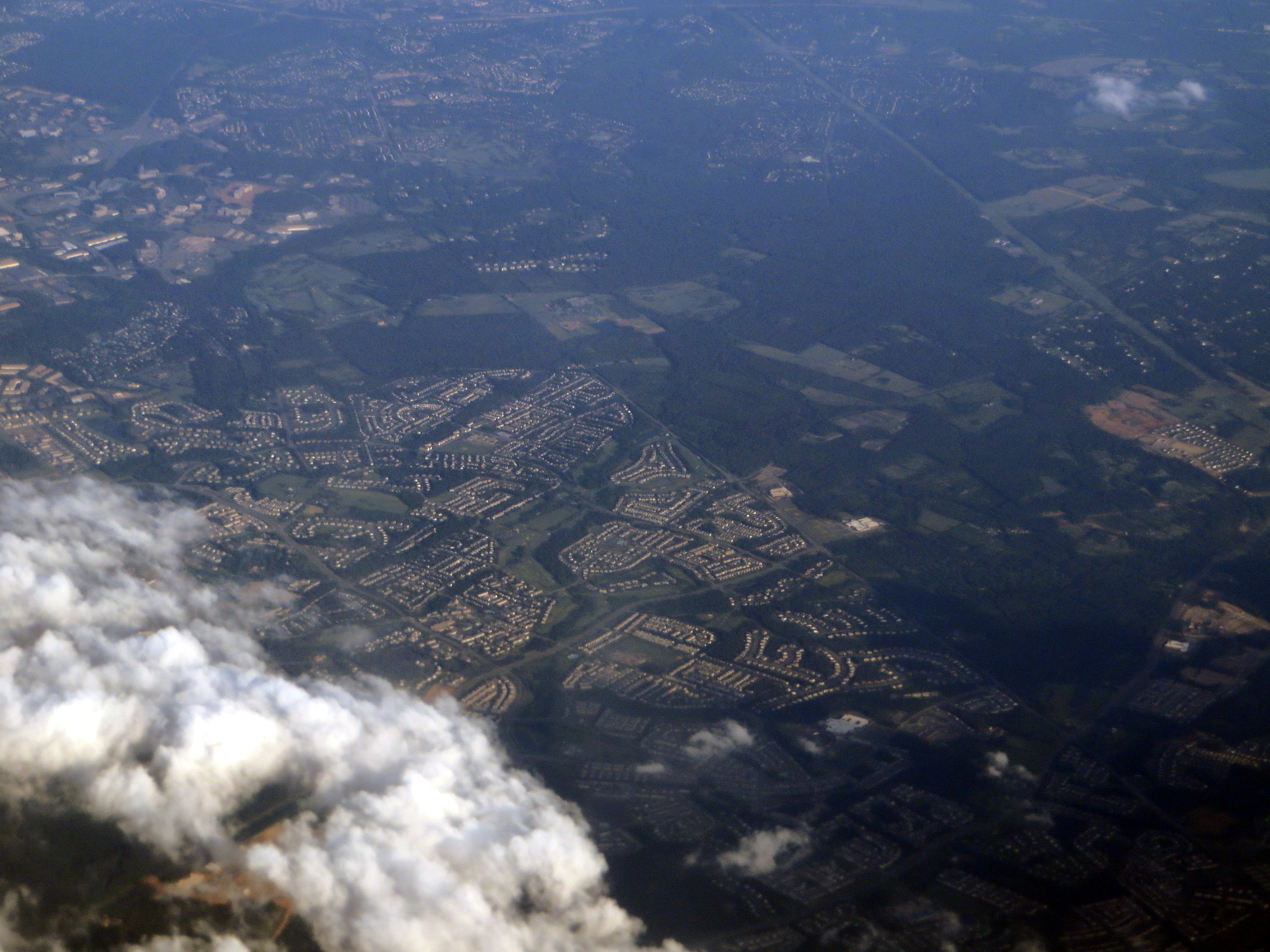
- The former Conklin area, now part of South Riding

- Location within Northern Virginia Location within Virginia Location within the United States
- Coordinates: 38°53′47″N 77°31′0″W
- Country: United States
- State: Virginia
- County: Loudoun
- Time zone: UTC−5 (Eastern (EST))
  - Summer (DST): UTC−4 (EDT)

Conklin was an unincorporated community in Loudoun County, Virginia, United States. The site of the former community is located around State Route 620 (Braddock Road) State Route 606 (Loudoun County Parkway) and straddles the southern border of the census-designated place of South Riding. The only two buildings remaining of the community are the Settle-Dean Cabin, the home of a family of enslaved people, and Prosperity Baptist Church and Cemetery.

== History ==
After the American Civil War (1861–1865), emancipated black slaves settled in the area that would later be known as Conklin. The community would receive this name after Pennsylvanians John R. and Mary Conklin built a homestead in the 1870s. The Conklins would establish a store here in 1890 and it would serve as a post office for the community. In 1872, the Conklin School, a single-room schoolhouse for Black children, was built and operated until 1948.

In the 1850s, one of the emancipated slaves who lived in Conklin, Charles Dean, was willed the 142 acre property of his slaveowners, the Settle family. He, with assistance from his daughter Jennie Dean, donated a portion of his to establish Prosperity Baptist Church in 1889. The church was burnt down in a fire of unspecified cause in 1951, but a new church building would be constructed in 1972. One of the few remaining buildings of Conklin is the Settle-Dean Cabin, which was the home that the Dean family lived in while enslaved.

In 1995, the community of South Riding was established. The new community would engulf Conklin as the homebuilding company Toll Brothers began developing residential subdivisions at the site. The Settle-Dean Cabin, which was in poor condition, was dismantled and relocated on the western side of Loudoun County Parkway to make way for the new development and informative signs were added at the new site. A ceremony was held on November 5, 2011, to celebrate the completion of the project.

== See also ==
- Willard, Virginia, a nearby former black community
