= Sudley Springs, Virginia =

Unincorporated community in Virginia, US

Coordinates: 38°50′28″N 77°32′16″W

Sudley Springs is an unincorporated community in Prince William County, in the U.S. state of Virginia.
