= South Riding, Virginia =

- Census-designated place
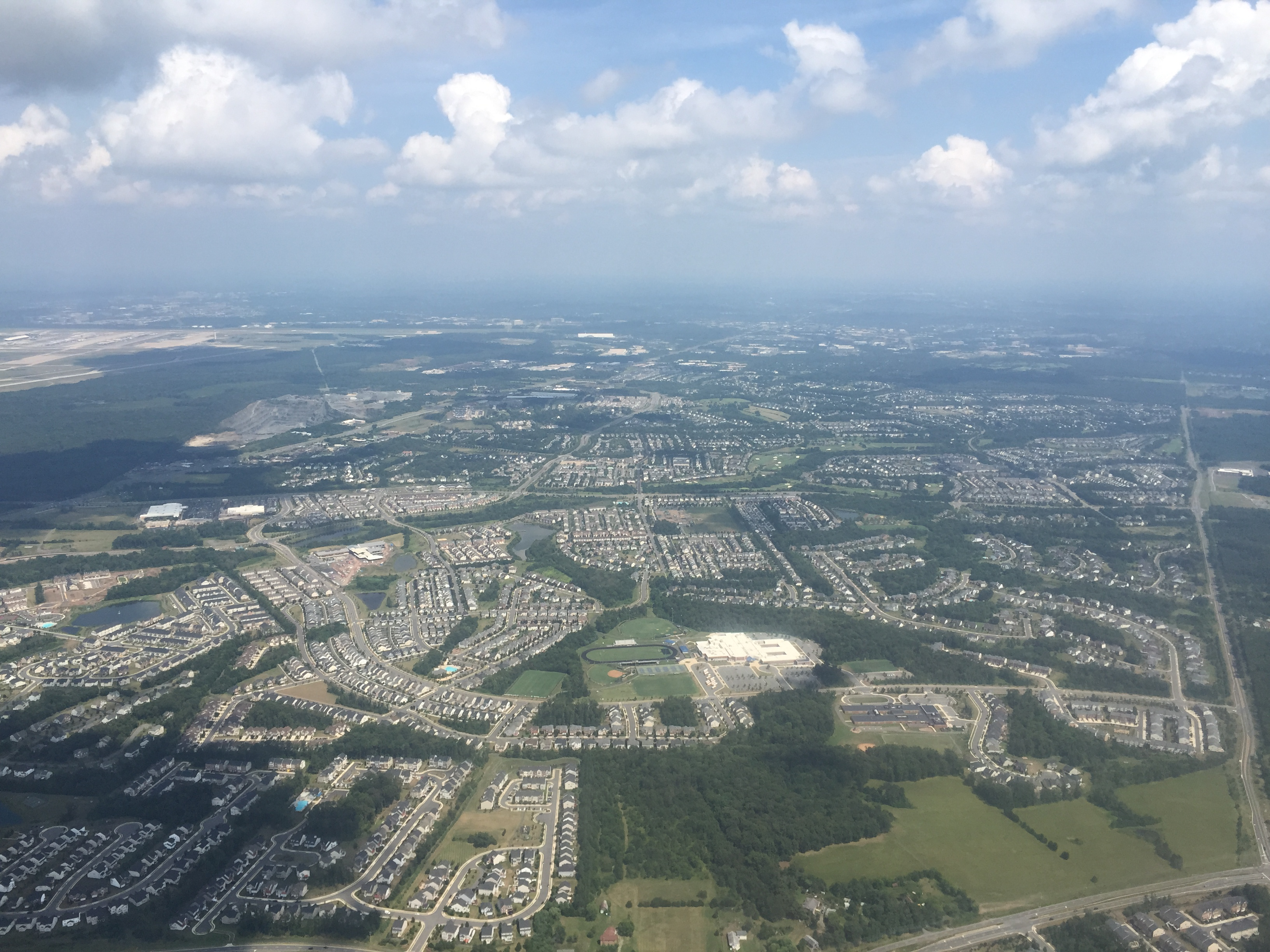
- View of South Riding, with Freedom High School visible in the lower center

- Location within Virginia Location within the United States
- Coordinates: 38°54′43.19″N 77°30′47.60″W
- Country: United States
- State: Virginia
- County: Loudoun
- Founded: January 1995
- Named for: South Yorkshire

Government
  - Type: Board of directors
  - President: Steve Pasquale (NPD)

Area
  - Total: 6.918 sq mi (17.918 km^{2})
  - Land: 6.844 sq mi (17.727 km^{2})
  - Water: 0.073 sq mi (0.189 km^{2})
- Elevation: 282 ft (86 m)

Population (2020)
  - Total: 33,877
  - Density: 4,950/sq mi (1,911/km^{2})
- Time zone: UTC–5 (Eastern (EST))
  - Summer (DST): UTC–4 (EDT)
- ZIP Code: 20152
- Area codes: 703 and 571
- FIPS code: 51-74100
- GNIS feature ID: 2584921
- Website: southriding.net

South Riding is a census-designated place and planned community in Loudoun County, Virginia, United States. The population was 33,877 at the 2020 census, The South Riding homeowner association was founded in January 1995 to provide services to the community. Neighboring U.S. Route 50 and State Route 28 provide access to the Dulles/Reston/Tysons Corner technology corridor and other major employment centers in Northern Virginia and Washington, D.C.

== History ==
=== Establishment and development ===
In January 1995, the Declarant of developers who owned the land established South Riding Proprietary as a not for profit corporation, as a way of providing services to residents of what became South Riding. In 2009, South Riding Proprietary was granted 501(c)(4) status by the Internal Revenue Service. The Proprietary continues to own and govern South Riding.

== Recreational and cultural activities ==
Parks, recreation, and community activities are managed by the Dulles South Recreation & Community Center, located along Riding Center Drive. The center is home to, among other activities, a climbing wall, a competitive pool, a leisure pool, a senior center, and facilities which can be rented.

=== Parks and recreation ===
South Riding features numerous green spaces, with approximately six miles of trails.

South Riding is home to South Riding Golf Club, designed by golf course architect Dan Maples, and opened in 1997. It was voted one of the "Top 100 Courses in the Mid-Atlantic" by the Washington Golf Monthly Magazine, and was voted "Best New Course" by Golf Digest in 1998.

South Riding has several pools, including South Riding Center Pool, Meadows Pool, Town Hall Pool, and the Hyland Hills Swimming Pool and Splash Park, as well as the indoor pools at the Dulles South Recreation & Community Center.

== Transportation ==
South Riding is less than one mile south of U.S. Route 50, which connects the town to Chantilly and Virginia State Route 28 in the east. South Riding is crossed by four other major roads: Virginia State Route 2200 (Tall Cedars Parkway) in the center, Virginia State Route 742 (Poland Road) in the center, Virginia State Route 606 (Loudoun County Parkway) slightly to the west, Virginia State Route 659 (Gum Spring Road), which forms the town's western border, Virginia State Route 609, Virginia State Route 620, which forms the town's southern border, and Virginia State Route 28. The Fairfax County line forms the town's eastern border.

South Riding is served by the East Gate bus station in the Town Center, which serves and is the eastern terminus of the 88 route. The 88 route connects the town to settlements further west along U.S. Route 50, including Stone Ridge.

Residents in South Riding can even take international flights from Dulles Airport, 10 miles from town.

== Geography ==
South Riding is located at 38°54′43.19″N 77°30′47.60″W (38.9119985, −77.5132235).

According to the United States Census Bureau, the city has a total area of 6.918 square miles (17.92 km^{2}), of which 6.845 square miles (17.73 km^{2}) is land and 0.073 square miles (0.19 km^{2}) (1.05%) is water. The community is drained by Elklick Run, a south-flowing tributary of Cub Run and part of the Bull Run watershed flowing south to the Occoquan River and eventually the tidal Potomac River.

South Riding is located in southeastern Loudoun County. Neighboring communities are Arcola and Dulles to the north, Stone Ridge to the west, Conklin to the south, Schneider Crossroads to the southeast, and Chantilly in Fairfax County to the east.

== Climate ==
The climate in this area is characterized by hot, humid summers and generally mild to cool winters. According to the Köppen Climate Classification system, South Riding has a humid subtropical climate, abbreviated "Cfa" on climate maps.

Climate data for South Riding, Virginia, 1990–present normals, extremes 1970–present
Month	Jan	Feb	Mar	Apr	May	Jun	Jul	Aug	Sep	Oct	Nov	Dec	Year
Record high °F (°C)	79 (26)	80 (27)	89 (31)	93 (33)	97 (36)	102 (38)	105 (40)	104 (40)	100 (37)	96 (35)	84 (28)	79 (26)	105 (40)
Average high °F (°C)	42.5 (5.8)	46.4 (8)	55.5 (13)	66.7 (19.2)	75.1 (23.9)	83.8 (28.7)	87.9 (31)	86.6 (30.3)	79.4 (26.3)	68.2 (20.1)	57.5 (14.1)	46 (7.7)	66.3 (19)
Average low °F (°C)	23.9 (−4.5)	26 (−3.3)	32.9 (0.5)	42.1 (5.6)	51.2 (10.6)	61 (16.1)	65.5 (18.6)	64.2 (17.8)	56.3 (13.5)	43.8 (6.5)	35.3 (1.8)	27.1 (−2.7)	44.1 (6.7)
Record low °F (°C)	−18 (−27)	−14 (−25)	−1 (−18)	17 (−8)	28 (−2)	36 (2)	41 (5)	38 (3)	30 (−1)	15 (−9)	9 (−12)	−4 (−20)	−18 (−27)
Average precipitation inches (mm)	2.7 (68)	2.7 (68)	3.4 (86)	3.5 (88)	4.6 (115)	4 (101)	3.7 (93)	3.5 (88)	3.9 (99)	3.3 (83)	3.4 (86)	3 (76)	41.5 (1054)
Average snowfall inches (cm)	7.3 (18.5)	7.6 (19.3)	2.8 (7.1)	0.3 (0.7)	0 (0)	0 (0)	0 (0)	0 (0)	0 (0)	0 (0)	0.5 (1.2)	3.5 (8.8)	22 (55.8)
Average precipitation days	10	9	11	11	12	11	11	9	9	8	9	10	119
Average snowy days	4	3	2	0	0	0	0	0	0	0	0	2	10

== Government ==
South Riding is a census-designated place in Loudoun County; therefore, schools, roads, and law enforcement are provided by the county.

=== South Riding Proprietary staff ===
South Riding is owned and governed by the not for profit South Riding Proprietary. All persons who purchase residential property in South Riding are automatically members of the Proprietary, and are subject to dues, which cannot be severed unless the property is sold. By the governing documents, members are subject to responsibilities, and are granted rights and privileges. The Proprietary is headquartered at Town Hall on Center Street, and is led by General Manager Kristi Felouzis.

=== Board of directors ===
The board of directors is the executive branch of the community government, led by the President, currently Steve Pasquale, and the Vice President, currently Michael Hardin. There are seven members elected by residents. As stated by the governing documents, the Board's responsibilities include, "developing the annual budget and setting assessments, promulgating and enforcing rules and regulations, administering the architectural scheme of the community and regulating exterior appearance of the homes and providing for the necessary personnel and contractual services to maintain all commonly owned property and facilities". The Board of Directors also establishes committees which handle specific issues. The board meets monthly at the South Riding Center.

=== Representation ===
South Riding lies entirely within Virginia's 10th congressional district, currently represented in Congress by Representative Suhas Subramanyam (D-Brambleton). It is represented by Atoosa Reaser (D-Sterling) in the state House of Delegates, and by Kannan Srinivasan in the state Senate.

== Local media ==
South Riding lies within the distribution zone for two national newspapers, the Washington Post, and the Washington Times, as well as for the local Loudoun Times-Mirror. South Riding is also covered by AOL's Patch service's Chantilly division.

== Education ==
Schools serving South Riding. As a part of Loudoun County, South Riding is served by Loudoun County Public Schools in Ashburn and private schools.

=== Public High School ===
- Freedom High School

=== Private High School ===
- St. Paul VI Catholic High School in Chantilly

=== Public Middle Schools ===
- J. Michael Lunsford Middle School
- Mercer Middle School

=== Public Elementary Schools ===
- Cardinal Ridge Elementary
- Hutchison Farm Elementary
- Liberty Elementary
- Little River Elementary
- Pinebrook Elementary

==== Day care/after school programs ====
- Montessori School of South Riding
- Everbrook Academy of South Riding
- Minnieland Academy at South Riding
- Kiddie Academy of South Riding
- The Madame Curie School of Science & Technology
- ALOHA Mind Math of South Riding
- East Gate Montessori School
- The Goddard School of Chantilly
- Winwood Children's Center
- C2 Education of South Riding
- South Riding KinderCare
- Primrose School of South Riding
- Huntington Learning Center of South Riding
- South Riding Learning Center

=== Public Libraries ===
South Riding is served by Gum Spring Library, a branch of Loudoun County Public Library in Stone Ridge.

== Demographics ==
Historical population
Census	Pop.	Note	%±
2010	24,256		—
2020	33,877		39.7%
U.S. Decennial Census; 2010 2020

South Riding was first listed as a census designated place in the 2010 U.S. census.

=== Racial and ethnic composition ===
South Riding, Virginia – racial and ethnic composition Note: the US Census treats Hispanic/Latino as an ethnic category. This table excludes Latinos from the racial categories and assigns them to a separate category. Hispanics/Latinos may be of any race.
Race / ethnicity (NH = non-Hispanic)	Pop. 2010	Pop. 2020	% 2010	% 2020
White alone (NH)	13,019	13,555	53.67%	40.01%
Black or African American alone (NH)	1,506	2,409	6.21%	7.11%
Native American or Alaska Native alone (NH)	39	47	0.16%	0.14%
Asian alone (NH)	6,995	13,161	28.84%	38.85%
Pacific Islander alone (NH)	10	27	0.04%	0.08%
Other race alone (NH)	44	149	0.18%	0.44%
Mixed race or multiracial (NH)	837	1,866	3.45%	5.51%
Hispanic or Latino (any race)	1,806	2,663	7.45%	7.86%
Total	24,256	33,877	100.00%	100.00%

=== 2020 census ===
As of the 2020 census, South Riding had a population of 33,877, with 10,102 households and 8,753 families residing in the CDP. The population density was 4,949.2 inhabitants per square mile (1,910.9/km^{2}).

The median age was 36.1 years; 31.8% of residents were under the age of 18 and 6.2% of residents were 65 years of age or older. For every 100 females there were 96.9 males, and for every 100 females age 18 and over there were 94.5 males age 18 and over.

100.0% of residents lived in urban areas, while 0.0% lived in rural areas.

There were 10,102 households in South Riding, of which 58.4% had children under the age of 18 living in them. Of all households, 73.6% were married-couple households, 9.2% were households with a male householder and no spouse or partner present, and 14.2% were households with a female householder and no spouse or partner present. About 10.3% of all households were made up of individuals and 2.3% had someone living alone who was 65 years of age or older.

There were 10,187 housing units, of which 0.8% were vacant. The homeowner vacancy rate was 0.3% and the rental vacancy rate was 1.8%.

Racial composition as of the 2020 census
Race	Number	Percent
White	14,055	41.5%
Black or African American	2,475	7.3%
American Indian and Alaska Native	84	0.2%
Asian	13,211	39.0%
Native Hawaiian and Other Pacific Islander	29	0.1%
Some other race	856	2.5%
Two or more races	3,167	9.3%
Hispanic or Latino (of any race)	2,663	7.9%

=== American Community Survey ===
As of the 2023 American Community Survey, there are 10,429 estimated households in South Riding with an average of 3.28 persons per household. The CDP has a median household income of $190,701. Approximately 4.0% of the CDP's population lives at or below the poverty line. South Riding has an estimated 78.1% employment rate, with 66.5% of the population holding a bachelor's degree or higher and 94.1% holding a high school diploma.

The top five reported ancestries (people were allowed to report up to two ancestries, thus the figures will generally add to more than 100%) were English (57.5%), Spanish (8.1%), Indo-European (13.2%), Asian and Pacific Islander (17.0%), and Other (4.2%).

=== 2010 census ===
As of the 2010 census, there were 24,256 people, 7,414 households, and _ families residing in the CDP. The population density was 3,516.1 inhabitants per square mile (1,357.6/km^{2}). There were 7,653 housing units at an average density of 1,109.1 per square mile (428.2/km^{2}). The racial makeup of the CDP was 58.21% White, 6.45% African American, 0.21% Native American, 28.94% Asian, 0.06% Pacific Islander, 2.09% from some other races and 4.04% from two or more races. Hispanic or Latino people of any race were 7.45% of the population.

== Notable people ==
- Kevin Paredes (born 2003) – professional soccer player, United States international, and Olympian
