= Loudoun County Transit =

Public transit agency in Loudoun County, Virginia

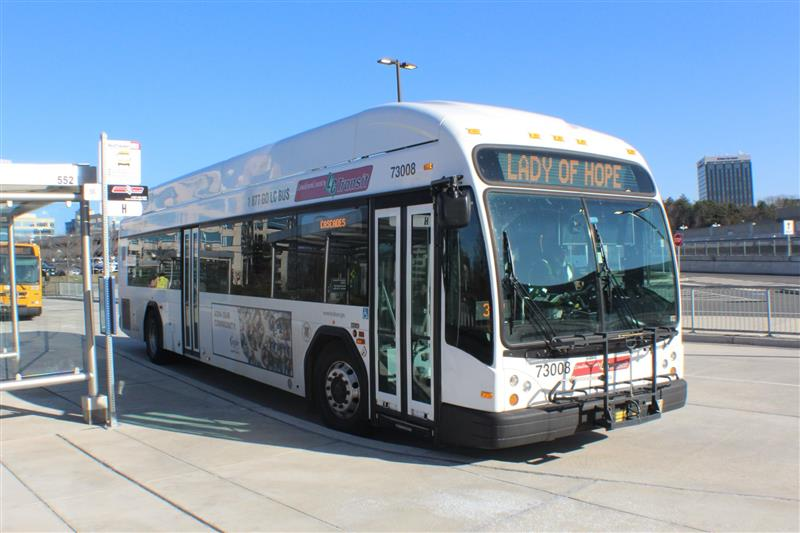
- A 2016 Gillig BRTPlus 40' Loudoun County Transit bus at Reston Town Center station
- Parent: Loudoun County
- Headquarters: 209 Gibson Street, NW Leesburg, Virginia 20177
- Locale: Loudoun County, Virginia, US
- Service type: Fixed-Route Bus Service, Demand Response and Paratransit
- Operator: Keolis
- Website: Official site

Loudoun County Transit (LC Transit) is a public-transportation service provided by the Loudoun County, Virginia government. Loudoun County Transit provides fixed routes and on-demand/paratransit bus service.

== Commuter busses ==
Loudoun County Transit operates commuter busses from Dulles, Leesburg, and Hamilton to Rosslyn, Virginia, Crystal City, Virginia, The Pentagon, and Washington, D.C. The service utilizes buses that are permitted to travel on the express lanes of the Dulles Toll Road, unlike normal traffic. This allows for a shorter trip and also bypasses commuter tolls. The Loudoun County Commuter Bus accepts payment via SmarTrip, a reloadable transit card issued by the Washington Metropolitan Area Transit Authority.

On December 5, 2022, Loudoun County Transit relocated bus service from the Dulles North Transit Center to the newly-built Dulles Transit Center. Busses were moved again on April 1, 2026, to Loudoun Gateway station. On July 3, 2023, LC Transit closed the park and ride lot in Purcellville, moving busses to the Harmony Park and Ride.

From October 20, 2025, to September 30, 2026, LC Transit operated a pilot project which operated busses from Loudoun County to Dale City and Frederick, Maryland.

== Local busses ==
Loudoun County Transit buses also operates local bus service through Sterling, Ashburn, and Leesburg, providing connections to Silver Line metro stations. Virginia Regional Transit only operates the Purcellville Connector that is part of local bus service. LC Transit uses long buses (seating around 50) with white and metal trim and display the LC Transit logo, while VRT buses are short (seating around 15) and have a predominantly white and maroon color scheme, frequently without a logo. Local buses are around the same size as VRT buses & have the LC Transit logo.

== Routes ==
=== Current routes ===
Route	Terminals		Notes
Commuter bus
281	Aldie; Dulles South Park and Ride	Washington, D.C. H & 4th Streets NW	AM service, operates only inbound towards Washington
282	Aldie; Dulles South Park and Ride	Arlington; Eads & 12th Streets	AM service, operates only inbound towards Washington
284	Aldie; Dulles South Park and Ride	Arlington; Pentagon station	AM service, operates only inbound towards Washington
481	Leesburg; Leesburg Park and Ride	Washington, D.C. H & 4th Streets NW	AM service, operates only inbound towards Washington
482	Leesburg; Leesburg Park and Ride	Arlington; Eads & 12th Streets	AM service, operates only inbound towards Washington
483	Purcelville; Purcelville Park and Ride	Arlington; Eads & 12th Streets	AM service, operates only inbound towards Washington
484	Hamilton; Harmony Park and Ride	Arlington; Eads & 12th Streets	AM service, operates only inbound towards Washington
486	Sterling Loudoun Gateway station	Washington, D.C. H & 4th Streets NW	AM service, operates only inbound towards Washington
681	Washington, D.C. H & 4th Streets NW	Chantilly; East Gate Park and Ride	PM service, operates only outbound towards Loudoun County
682	Crystal City - 18th Street & Route 1	Chantilly; East Gate Park and Ride	PM service, operates only outbound towards Loudoun County
684	Arlington; Pentagon station	Chantilly; East Gate Park and Ride	PM service, operates only outbound towards Loudoun County
881	Washington, D.C. H & 4th Streets NW	Leesburg; Leesburg Park and Ride	PM service, operates only outbound towards Loudoun County
882	Crystal City; 18th Street & US Route 1	Leesburg; Leesburg Park and Ride	PM service, operates only outbound towards Loudoun County
883	Washington, D.C. H & 4th Streets NW	Purcelville; Purcelville Park and Ride	PM service, operates only outbound towards Loudoun County
884	Washington, D.C. H & 4th Streets NW	Purcelville; Purcelville Park and Ride	PM service, operates only outbound towards Loudoun County
885	Washington, D.C. H & 4th Streets NW	Purcelville; Purcelville Park and Ride	PM service, operates only outbound towards Loudoun County
886	Washington, D.C. H & 4th Streets NW	Sterling Loudoun Gateway station	PM service, operates only outbound towards Loudoun County
Local bus
40	Purcelville; Purcelville Park and Ride	Leesburg; Loudoun County Government Center	Purcellville Connector
55	Leesburg Loop; Loudoun County Government Center		Leesburg Routes
56	Leesburg Loop; Loudoun County Government Center		Leesburg Routes
57	Leesburg Loop; Loudoun County Government Center		Leesburg Routes
62	Ashburn; Village Giant	Sterling; Dulles Town Center	Ashburn Connector
70	Leesburg Loudoun County Government Center	Sterling; NVCC Loudoun Campus	Leesburg to Sterling via Leesburg Pike
80	Sterling; Enterprise St & E Maple Av	Sterling; NVCC Loudoun Campus	Sugarland Run Connector
81	Sterling; Village at Potomac Falls	Sterling; Dulles Town Center	Countryside Connector
82	Sterling; William Watters House	Sterling; Sterling Library	Sterling Connector
Metro connection
312	Sterling; Village at Potomac Falls	Reston; Reston Town Center station	Potomac Falls
320/321	Ashburn; GWU Exploration Hall	McNair; Innovation Center station	George Washington University
322	Sterling; Dulles Town Center	McNair; Innovation Center station	Atlantic Boulevard Connector
323	McNair Loop; Innovation Center station		Sterling
331/332	Ashburn; One Loudoun	Ashburn; Ashburn station	One Loudoun
333	Ashburn - Quantum Park	Sterling; Loudoun Gateway station	Quantum Park/Pacific Boulevard/Loudoun Gateway
341/342	Ashburn; Ashburn Chase Apartments	Ashburn; Ashburn station	Ashburn Village
343/344	Goose Creek Village; Park and Ride	Ashburn; Ashburn station	Goose Creek/Ashburn Farm
351	Leesburg; Leesburg II Park and Ride	Ashburn; Ashburn station	Leesburg
371	Ashburn; Old Ryan Road & Pinkhorn Way	Ashburn; Ashburn station	Moorefield Parkway/Old Ryan Road
372	Ashburn; INOVA Ashburn Healthplex	Ashburn; Ashburn station	Westwind Farm
373	Ashburn; Waxpool Road & Truro Parish Drive	Ashburn; Ashburn station	Broadlands
374	Ashburn; Evergreen Ridge Drive & Barnstead Drive	Ashburn; Ashburn station	Brambleton
375	Brambleton; Brambleton Town Center	Ashburn; Ashburn station	Brambleton
381	Sterling Loop; Loudoun Gateway station		South Riding
382	Sterling; Stone Springs Hospital	Sterling; Loudoun Gateway station	Stone Ridge
391	Purcelville; Purcelville Park and Ride	Ashburn; Ashburn station	Purcellville/Harmony

=== Former routes ===
Route	Terminals		Notes
Commuter bus pilot
181	Frederick, MD Frederick Transit Center	One Loudoun Exchange Street	AM service, operates only inbound towards Loudoun County
182	Dale City Commuter Park & Ride Lot	Leesburg Loudoun County Government Center	AM service, operates only inbound towards Loudoun County
581	One Loudoun Exchange Street	Frederick, MD Frederick Transit Center	PM service, operates only outbound towards Frederick, Maryland and Prince William County
582	Leesburg Loudoun County Government Center	Dale City Commuter Park & Ride Lot	PM service, operates only outbound towards Frederick, Maryland and Prince William County
