= One Loudoun, Virginia =

One Loudoun
- Census-designated place
- Nickname: Downtown Loudoun
- Motto: Loudoun County's Downtown
- Location within Northern Virginia Location within Virginia Location within the United States
- Coordinates: 39°3′10″N 77°27′21″W
- Country: United States
- State: Virginia
- County: Loudoun
- Established: July 24, 2012
- Named for: Loudoun County

Government
  - Type: General Manager
  - General Manager: Vann Chounramany (Nonpartisan)

Area
  - Total: 0.64 sq mi (1.65 km^{2})
  - Land: 0.63 sq mi (1.64 km^{2})
  - Water: 0.0039 sq mi (0.01 km^{2})
- Elevation: 235 ft (72 m)

Population (2020)
  - Total: 2,285
  - Rank: 18
  - Density: 3,570/sq mi (1,380/km^{2})
- Demonym: One Loudounite
- Time zone: UTC−5 (Eastern (EST))
  - Summer (DST): UTC−4 (EDT)
- ZIP code: 20147 (Ashburn)
- Area codes: 703, 571
- FIPS code: 51-59364
- GNIS feature ID: 2804166
- Website: downtownoneloudoun.com

One Loudoun is a census-designated place (CDP) in Loudoun County, Virginia, United States. It is a mixed-use development just south of Virginia State Route 7, 29 miles (47 km) northwest of Washington, D.C., and 7 miles (11 km) southeast of Leesburg. One Loudoun was developed since the 2010 census, so it was not recognized as a census-designated place until the 2020 census. The community has an Ashburn mailing address.

As of the 2020 census, the population was 2,285.

== History ==
One Loudoun, originally named One Loudoun Place, first started planning the development in 2008 as an 358-acre mixed-use community. Phase One of Downtown broke ground on July 24, 2012, shortly before the planned Loudoun Hounds stadium relocated to One Loudoun. In 2016, Retail Properties of America (RPAI) acquired One Loudoun, and early that year Downtown opened.

=== Loudoun Hounds ===
The Loudoun Hounds' mission was to bring professional baseball to Loudoun County for the first time in its history, though at times locations in Fairfax or Prince William counties were considered. Originally, the Hounds sought permission for a 5,500-seat "Kincora Ballpark" in the mixed-use Kincora Village Center in December 2008, with it being approved by the Loudoun County Board of Supervisors in July 2010.

The original opening date was in 2013, but delays in road construction in Kincora in 2012 prevented ground from being broken, and on August 1, 2012, the parent company of the Hounds decided to relocate the stadium to One Loudoun instead. The Board of Supervisors approved a rezoning for the stadium area, and ground was broken on June 4, 2013. The planned Virginia Cavalry FC was also to be a tenant of Edelman Financial Field.

However, in 2014, the parent company of the Hounds asked the Board for $55,000,000 taxable bonds for the stadium; in September of that year One Loudoun sued the owners as they had failed to deliver a stadium by the April deadline, resulting in the lease being terminated.

== Parks and recreation ==
There are two parks in One Loudoun, both linear: Central Park and Saranac Park. Central Park, just west of downtown, has over a mile of trails, and features a pond, currently under construction. Construction of Saranac Park, in southern One Loudoun, has not yet begun.

The Barn at One Loudoun, in southern Central Park, hosts concerts and other events.

The Club at One Loudoun, across the street from Central Park, hosts the offices of the General Manager of the One Loudoun Neighborhood Association and the other staff, along with a pool and several playing fields.

== Transportation ==
=== Roadways ===
One Loudoun is served by two major state highways and two major county highways: Virginia State Route 7, which forms the CDP's northern boundary, and connects it to Ashburn, Leesburg, and U.S. Route 15 in the west and Sterling, Herndon, and Virginia State Route 28 in the east; Virginia State Route 607 (Loudoun County Parkway), which forms its eastern boundary and, as the Riverside Parkway to the north, connects it to University Center, Leesburg, and U.S. Route 15, and Moorefield, Brambleton, and Virginia State Route 267 in the south.

=== Public Transportation ===
Loudoun County Transit local bus routes 331 and 332 serve One Loudoun. Commuter bus routes 181 and 581 serve the development at Exchange Street. These commuter bus routes are in a one-year pilot, starting in October 20, 2025.

== Demographics ==
One Loudoun first appeared as a census designated place in the 2020 U.S. census.
