= Alex Carter (cornerback) =

American football player (born 1994)

No. 33, 36
- Position: Cornerback

Personal information
- Born: October 19, 1994 (age 32); Fairfax, Virginia, U.S.
- Listed height: 6 ft 0 in (1.83 m)
- Listed weight: 200 lb (91 kg)

Career information
- High school: Briar Woods (Ashburn, Virginia)
- College: Stanford (2012–2014)
- NFL draft: 2015: 3rd round, 80th overall pick

Career history
- Detroit Lions (2015–2016); New England Patriots (2017)*; Seattle Seahawks (2017)*; Chicago Bears (2017)*; Seattle Seahawks (2017–2018)*; Carolina Panthers (2018)*; Washington Redskins (2018)
- * Offseason or practice squad member only
- Stats at Pro Football Reference

Alexander Rhys Carter (born October 19, 1994) is an American former professional football player who was a cornerback in the National Football League (NFL). He was selected by the Detroit Lions in the third round of the 2015 NFL draft. He played college football for the Stanford Cardinal.

== Early life ==
Carter attended Briar Woods High School in Ashburn, Virginia, where he recorded over 1,000 all-purpose yards and 50 tackles with five interceptions (one returned for touchdown) as a senior. He helped lead his team to a 12–1 record and a win in the state championship game. He was named Virginia's 2011 Gatorade Player of the Year, and was selected to play in the 2012 U.S. Army All-American Bowl in San Antonio, Texas.

Carter also lettered in track & field at Briar Woods, competing during his junior year running the 100 meters, 4x100 and the long jump (6.62m or 21-7). He competed at the state meets and his fastest time in the 100-meter dash was 10.9 seconds.

Considered a four-star recruit by Rivals.com, Carter was ranked as the third-best safety prospect of his class, and drew comparisons to Tyvon Branch. On April 5, 2011, he accepted a scholarship offer and announced his commitment to Stanford.

== College career ==
As a true freshman in 2012, Carter played in all 14 games with starts in the last 8 games at cornerback. He recorded 46 tackles, including three tackles for loss, and led his team with three forced fumbles. In 2013, he started all 13 games, recording 59 tackles, 2.0 tackles for loss, one interception, team-high seven pass breakups. In 2014, he started all 13 games, recording 41 tackles with one interception and a team leading nine pass breakups.

On December 31, 2014, he announced he would forgo his remaining eligibility and enter the 2015 NFL draft.

== Professional career ==
Pre-draft measurables
Height	Weight	Arm length	Hand span	40-yard dash	20-yard shuttle	Three-cone drill	Vertical jump	Broad jump	Bench press
6 ft 0 in (1.83 m)	196 lb (89 kg)	32 1/8	9 1/8	4.51 s	4.07 s	7.05 s	40 in (1.02 m)	10 ft 1 in (3.07 m)	17 reps
All values from NFL Combine

=== Detroit Lions ===
Carter was selected 80th overall by the Detroit Lions in the 2015 NFL draft. The Lions traded up with the Minnesota Vikings for the pick, giving away their own third-round pick (88th overall, Vikings picked Danielle Hunter) and their fifth-round pick (143rd overall, Vikings picked MyCole Pruitt).

On September 3, 2016, Carter was waived by the Lions and was signed to the practice squad the next day. He was promoted to the active roster on December 24, 2016.

Carter was converted to safety during the 2017 offseason. He was waived by the Lions on September 2, 2017.

=== New England Patriots ===
On October 9, 2017, Carter was signed to the New England Patriots' practice squad, but was released three days later.

=== Seattle Seahawks (first stint) ===
On November 14, 2017, Carter was signed to the Seattle Seahawks' practice squad. He was released on November 21, 2017.

=== Chicago Bears ===
On November 27, 2017, Carter was signed to the Chicago Bears' practice squad. He was released on December 12, 2017.

=== Seattle Seahawks (second stint) ===
On December 19, 2017, Carter was signed to the Seahawks' practice squad. He signed a reserve/future contract with the Seahawks on January 2, 2018. He was waived on August 2, 2018.

=== Carolina Panthers ===
On August 12, 2018, Carter signed with the Carolina Panthers. He was waived on August 31, 2018.

=== Washington Redskins ===
On December 18, 2018, Carter was signed to the Washington Redskins practice squad. He was promoted to the active roster on December 27, 2018. He was waived on April 30, 2019.

== Personal life ==
Has two children, Mikah Alexander Carter (born February 15, 2018) with ex-wife Ariana Alston, and Akani Christian Carter (born October 28, 2021) with former girlfriend Akasha Marie. Carter's father, Tom, was a first-round draft pick in the 1993 NFL draft by the Washington Redskins.
