= Briar Woods High School =

Location
- 22525 Belmont Ridge Road; Ashburn, Virginia 20148; United States
- 38°59′33″N 77°31′50″W

Information
- School type: Public high school
- Founded: 2005
- School district: Loudoun County Public Schools
- NCES District ID: 5102250
- Superintendent: Dr. Aaron Spence
- NCES School ID: 510225002451
- Principal: Sheila Alzate
- Teaching staff: 130.85 (on an FTE basis)
- Grades: 9–12
- Enrollment: 1,862 (2024–25)
- Student to teacher ratio: 14.23
- Language: English
- Campus: Suburban
- Colors: Navy and orange
- Athletics conference: Potomac District; VHSL Class 5 - Region D
- Mascot: Falcon
- Nickname: Briar
- Communities served: Broadlands; Brambleton; Waxpool
- Feeder schools: Eagle Ridge Middle School; Hillside Elementary School; Mill Run Elementary School; Waxpool Elementary School
- Website: www.lcps.org/o/bwh

Briar Woods High School is a public secondary school located in Ashburn, an unincorporated area in Loudoun County, Virginia, United States, and is part of Loudoun County Public Schools. The school serves students who live in the Broadlands, Brambleton, and Waxpool communities.

== History ==
Briar Woods High School opened on August 29, 2005 with its student body coming from Stone Bridge High School, Loudoun County High School, and Eagle Ridge Middle School. The first Principal was Edward Starzenski, who was principal of Loudoun County High School from 1989 to 2004. The school was officially dedicated on October 14, 2005 at a ceremony presided over by school district superintendent Edgar B. Hatrick III. In 2006, Briar Woods celebrated its first Homecoming, despite the lack of a returning class.

During the summer before the 2011–2012 school year, ten trailers were installed due to an increased enrollment for the year. In the 2014–2015 school year, students living in Loudoun Valley Estates and most of Brambleton were shifted to Rock Ridge High School to relieve overcrowding. This dropped Briar's enrollment by about 500 students.

In 2023, a new addition was put on the back of the building. This eliminated the need for the ten trailers.

== Demographics ==
As of the 2023–2024 school year, the student population was 41.5% White, 37.5% Asian, 7.9% Hispanic, 7.1% Black, and 5.7% two or more races.

== Curriculum ==
See Main Discussion: Loudoun County Public Schools – Curriculum

Briar Woods is a fully accredited high school by the Virginia Department of Education.

== Athletics ==
Briar Woods is a member of the Potomac District and competes in Region 5D of the Virginia High School League.

== Feeder pattern ==
for the 2021-2022 school year:

- Eagle Ridge Middle School
  - Hillside Elementary School
  - Mill Run Elementary School
  - Waxpool Elementary School

== Notable alumni ==
- Alex Carter, cornerback for the Seattle Seahawks
- Lina Granados, footballer for FF Lugano 1976, attended Vanderbilt University
- Trace McSorley, Professional Football player, offensive analyst for Penn State Football
