= Loudoun Valley Estates, Virginia =

- Census-designated place
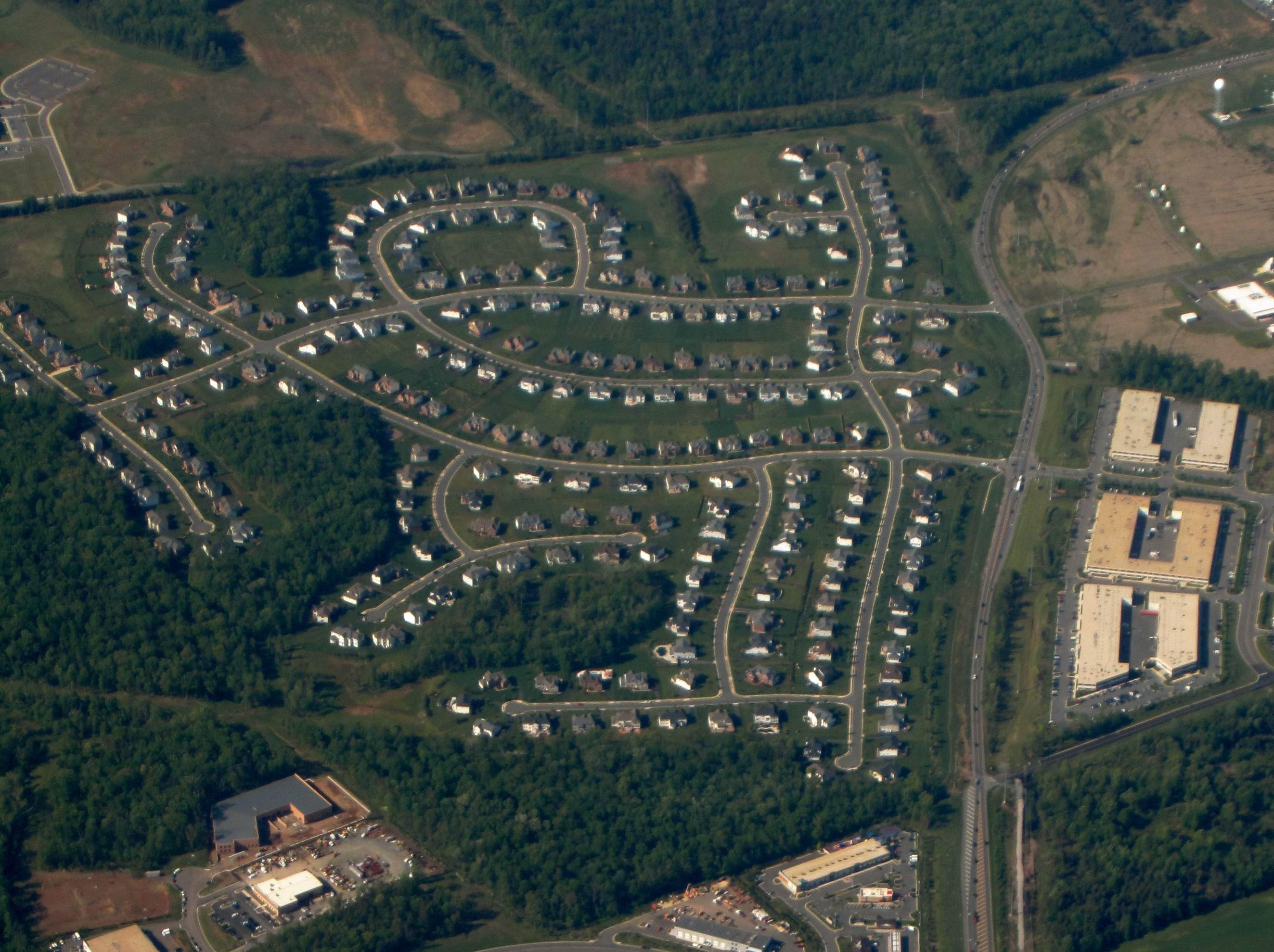
- Aerial view of the Loudoun Valley Estates

- Location within Northern Virginia Location within Virginia Location within the United States
- Coordinates: 38°58′51″N 77°30′28″W
- Country: United States
- State: Virginia
- County: Loudoun

Area
  - Total: 2.83 sq mi (7.32 km^{2})
  - Land: 2.81 sq mi (7.27 km^{2})
  - Water: 0.023 sq mi (0.06 km^{2})
- Elevation: 295 ft (90 m)

Population (2010)
  - Total: 3,656
  - Density: 1,303/sq mi (503.2/km^{2})
- Time zone: UTC−5 (Eastern (EST))
  - Summer (DST): UTC−4 (EDT)
- ZIP codes: 20148 (Ashburn); 20166 (Sterling)
- FIPS code: 51-47136
- GNIS feature ID: 2584868

Loudoun Valley Estates is a census-designated place (CDP) in Loudoun County, Virginia, United States. As of the 2020 census, Loudoun Valley Estates had a population of 11,436. It is a Toll Brothers community located near the planned Ashburn Metro station complex and Moorefield Station town center in the southern part of Ashburn. Loudoun Valley Estates is governed by a homeowners' association.

It was formerly part of the county planning commission's Urban Policy Area but has been removed. The community is served by the Loudoun County Parkway.

== Geography ==
Loudoun Valley Estates is in southeastern Loudoun County and is bordered by Brambleton to the south and west, Broadlands and Moorefield to the north, and the runways of Dulles International Airport to the east. It is 2 miles (3 km) southwest of the Dulles Greenway (Virginia Route 267), 11 miles (18 km) south of Leesburg, the county seat, and 32 miles (51 km) west-northwest of Washington, D.C.

According to the U.S. Census Bureau, the Loudoun Valley Estates CDP has a total area of 2.8 square miles (7.3 km^{2}), of which 0.02 square miles (0.06 km^{2}), or 0.76%, are water. The community is drained by Broad Run, a northeast-flowing tributary of the Potomac River.

The land around Loudoun Valley Estates is gently rolling. The average elevation is 289 feet (88 m). The population density is about 500 people per square kilometer.

The climate is humid subtropical. The average temperature is 57 °F (14 °C). The warmest month is August, at 77 °F (25 °C), and the coldest is January, at 32 °F (0 °C). The average rainfall 46.8 inches (1,188 mm) per year. The wettest month was October, at 5.0 inches (128 mm) of rain, and the least wet was November, at 2.1 inches (54 mm).

== Demographics ==
Historical population
Census	Pop.	Note	%±
2010	3,656		—
2020	11,436		212.8%
U.S. Decennial Census; 2010 2020

=== 2020 census ===
As of the 2020 census, Loudoun Valley Estates had a population of 11,436. The median age was 35.5 years. 32.3% of residents were under the age of 18 and 5.0% of residents were 65 years of age or older. For every 100 females there were 97.8 males, and for every 100 females age 18 and over there were 98.2 males age 18 and over.

100.0% of residents lived in urban areas, while 0.0% lived in rural areas.

There were 3,448 households in Loudoun Valley Estates, of which 62.8% had children under the age of 18 living in them. Of all households, 76.6% were married-couple households, 9.0% were households with a male householder and no spouse or partner present, and 11.2% were households with a female householder and no spouse or partner present. About 9.1% of all households were made up of individuals and 0.8% had someone living alone who was 65 years of age or older.

There were 3,510 housing units, of which 1.8% were vacant. The homeowner vacancy rate was 0.5% and the rental vacancy rate was 2.9%.

Racial composition as of the 2020 census
Race	Number	Percent
White	2,719	23.8%
Black or African American	755	6.6%
American Indian and Alaska Native	34	0.3%
Asian	6,946	60.7%
Native Hawaiian and Other Pacific Islander	3	0.0%
Some other race	253	2.2%
Two or more races	726	6.3%
Hispanic or Latino (of any race)	616	5.4%

=== 2010 census ===
Loudon Valley Estates was first listed as a census designated place in the 2010 U.S. census.

According to the 2010 census, Loudoun Valley Estates had a population of 3,656. Of this, 29.3% were white; 4.2% African American; 0.3% were American Indians and Alaska Natives; 61% were Asian; 0.0% Hawaiians and other Pacific Islanders; 1.1% from another race, and 4.1% from two or more races. 3.3% of the total population were Hispanic or Latino of any race.

== Notable residents ==
Survivor contestant Reem Daly lives in Loudoun Valley Estates.

== Schools ==
Rock Ridge High School and Rosa Lee Carter Elementary are located within the community.
