= Lina Granados =

Colombian footballer (born 1994)

Personal information
- Full name: Lina Paola Granados Reyes
- Date of birth: 19 May 1994 (age 32)
- Place of birth: Bogotá, Colombia
- Height: 1.68 m (5 ft 6 in)
- Position: Defender

Youth career
- McLean Strikers
- –2012: Briar Woods Falcons

College career
Years	Team	Apps	(Gls)
2012–2015	Vanderbilt Commodores	46	(1)

Senior career*
Years	Team	Apps	(Gls)
2014–2015	Washington Spirit Reserves		
2018	Patriotas Boyacá		
2018–2020	FF Lugano 1976	36	(0)

International career^{‡}
2012–2014	Colombia U20		
- * Club domestic league appearances and goals as of 02:32, 28 December 2019 (UTC) ‡ National team caps and goals as of 02:32, 28 December 2019 (UTC)

Lina Paola Granados Reyes (born 19 May 1994) is a Colombian footballer who plays as a defender.

== Career ==
In high school, Granados played for the Falcons of Briar Woods High School, where she served as the team captain as a senior. She earned First-Team All-District selections, and was selected in the Second-Team All-Met as a junior. She also played for the McLean Strikers youth team, where she won the 2010 Virginia State Cup and reached the USYS national finals. Granados was a member of the Region I team of the Olympic Development Program for five years, competing at ODP Inter-Regionals in Florida each year. In college, she played for the Commodores of Vanderbilt University from 2012 to 2015. She played for three seasons, having redshirted in 2013, and made 46 appearances, scoring one goal and recording two assists.

Granados was included in the Colombia under-20 squads for the 2012 and 2014 editions of the South American U-20 Women's Championship. She also competed with the under-20 national team in the football tournament at the 2013 Bolivarian Games in Trujillo, Peru, helping the team to win the gold medal. In June 2015, Granados was called up to the Colombia women's national team for the 2015 FIFA Women's World Cup in Canada. She was a member of the 35-player provisional squad, but was initially cut from the final tournament squad before being selected as a replacement for the injured Melissa Ortiz. However, she did not make an appearance in the tournament, in which Colombia were eliminated in the round of 16 by future world champions United States.

On the club level, Granados played for the Washington Spirit Reserves in the USL W-League from 2014 to 2015. In 2018, she played for Colombian team Patriotas Boyacá. Later that year, Granados joined Swiss club FF Lugano 1976 of the Nationalliga A. On 25 September 2019, she made her UEFA Women's Champions League debut against English club Manchester City, with the away match finishing as a 0–4 loss.

== Personal life ==
Granados was born in Bogotá, Colombia, before later moving to Costa Rica. At the age of five, she moved with her family to Ashburn, Virginia, and holds dual American citizenship. She graduated from Vanderbilt University in 2016 with a degree in engineering science.
