= Virginia Cavalry FC =

- Full name: Virginia Cavalry Football Club
- Founded: 2012
- Dissolved: 2015
- Stadium: Edelman Financial Field; Ashburn, Virginia
- Capacity: 5,500
- Owner: Loudoun Professional Soccer, LLC (LPS)
- League: North American Soccer League

Virginia Cavalry FC was a planned American professional soccer team based in Ashburn, Virginia. Founded in 2012, the team was expected to make its debut in the North American Soccer League (NASL), the second division of professional soccer in the United States soccer league system, in 2016.

The franchise planned to commence league play upon the completion of a stadium construction project, Edelman Financial Field.

== History ==
On November 20, 2012, the North American Soccer League announced that a Virginia expansion team would join the league for the 2014 season upon the completion of a new multi-sport stadium project in the One Loudoun development in Ashburn, known as Edelman Financial Field. Loudoun Professional Soccer, LLC (LPS) was named as the ownership group of the club, with former D.C. United goalkeeper and coach Mark Simpson as Director of Soccer Operations. The franchise was owned by VIP Sports & Entertainment, who also owned the proposed Loudoun Hounds minor league baseball team which was planned to share the stadium with the NASL team.

On February 6, 2013, the club announced that their name would be "Virginia Cavalry FC", with a club crest, colors and kit to follow. On April 5, the Cavalry announced its red, black, and silver color scheme and its crest's colors.

On December 6, 2013, the team announced it would push back its entrance to the NASL to the 2015 season due to delays in constructing their stadium.

In early July 2014, it was announced that the team's debut would be pushed to the 2016 season due to reorganization of ownership. In an interview published on August 10, 2015, NASL Commissioner Bill Peterson told the Telegraph that the league had moved on from the franchises in Virginia and Oklahoma City.

== Colors and badge ==
Virginia Cavalry unveiled their crest on April 5, 2013. The crest features a checkboard shield with a red field in the lower lefthand and upper righthand panels, with black fields in the opposite panels. In the first panel, the letters "VAC" overlap one another. The next panel over shows a silhouette of a stallion, recalling the club's name. The bottom two panels are covered with a banner showing the club's name, with the letters "FC" beneath the banner.

== Stadium ==
- Edelman Financial Field, Ashburn, Virginia (planned, never played)
