= Fleetwood Farm =

- U.S. National Register of Historic Places
- Virginia Landmarks Register
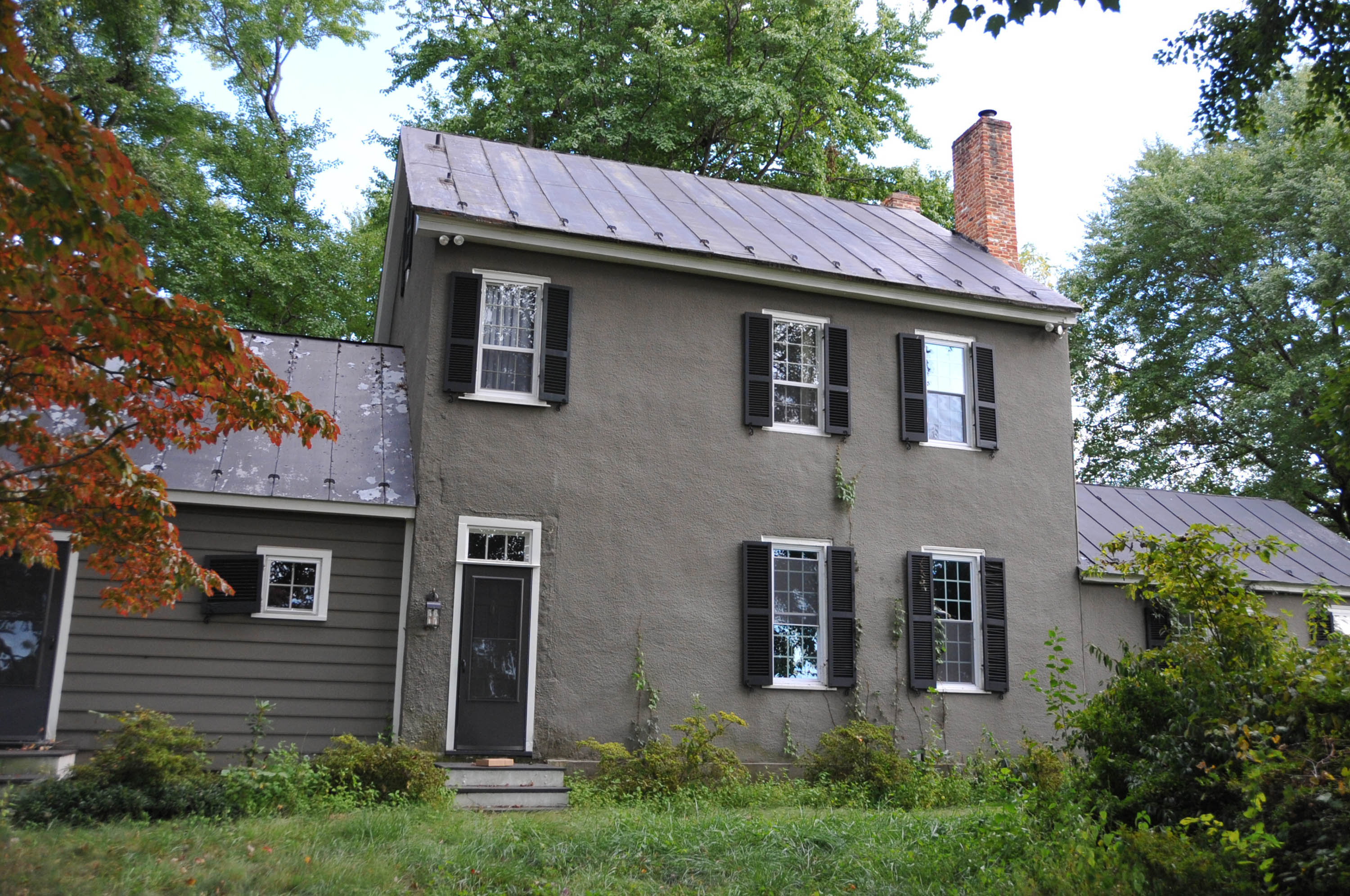

- Location within Northern Virginia Location within Virginia Location within the United States
- Nearest city: Arcola, Virginia
- Coordinates: 38°59′19.83″N 77°33′44.27″W
- Area: 12 acres (4.9 ha)
- Built: 1775
- Architectural style: Federal
- NRHP reference No.: 90002172
- VLR No.: 053-0629

Significant dates
- Added to NRHP: February 1, 1991
- Designated VLR: December 12, 1989

Fleetwood Farm, also known as Peggy's Green, is a Federal style house in Loudoun County, Virginia. The house is conjectured to have been built around 1775 by William Ellzey, a lawyer originally from Virginia's Tidewater region. Ellzey, as a member of the gentry, was a participant in Loudoun County's pre-Revolutionary activities. His signature is recorded on the Resolves for Independence that were the result of a public meeting held on June 14, 1774, in Loudoun County. In 1784 Ellzey owned eighteen slaves, fifteen horses, and twenty cattle. He was prominent in other aspects of public life, serving as deputy clerk of the court in 1749. Thus as a member of one of the wealthier families in the county, Ellzey built his home in the style that was popular with men of his standing. He died on February 14, 1796; on May 3, 1796, the property was bequeathed to Albert Russell, husband of Ann Harris Frances Ellzey.

The house is an unusual example of post-and-beam construction in a region where stone or brick construction is more usual. The house is a 2-1/2 story post-and-beam framed structure on a stone foundation and basement. The frame is infilled with brick nogging and covered with weatherboarding. The weatherboards are covered with stucco. The main block is three bays with a small entry porch supported by Tuscan columns. A one-story frame addition extends to the west. The interior was originally arranged on a side-passage plan, which has since been altered. The house features extensive wainscoting. The main parlor features full-height paneling. A second wing was added in 1984. The stucco is believed to have been installed in the 1930s or 1940s. A dining room is also accessed from the side hall. The second floor of the main house has two bedrooms.

The property includes three contributing outbuildings: a smokehouse, springhouse and barn. The house and outbuildings were listed on the National Register of Historic Places on February 1, 1991.
