= Loudoun Hounds =

Team logo
Cap insignia

Information
- League: Atlantic League of Professional Baseball
- Location: Ashburn, Virginia
- Ballpark: Edelman Financial Field
- Founded: 2010
- Nickname(s): The Dogs
- Colors: Maroon, black, khaki, ecru, white
- Ownership: VIP Sports & Entertainment
- Media: Loudoun Times-Mirror; Leesburg Today; Ashburn Patch; Leesburg Patch

The Loudoun Hounds were a planned minor league baseball team based in Ashburn, Virginia. They were first anticipated to begin play in the Atlantic League of Professional Baseball, an independent baseball league, upon completion of their stadium, Edelman Financial Field. The organization was established in 2010, but due to funding issues they ruled out fielding a team for the 2014 season. Their offices were closed and their phones disconnected in September 2014. A lawsuit filed against them that month sought to end their stadium site lease. The suit was settled in February 2016 with the lease being terminated.

== History ==
VIP Baseball (later known as VIP Sports & Entertainment) worked for several years to bring a ballpark and a team to Loudoun County. In July 2009, Loudoun County politicians approved the ballpark project put forth by VIP Baseball. The organization also pursued a franchise in the North American Soccer League (NASL), which was awarded in 2012 and named the Virginia Cavalry FC. It was anticipated to share the Hounds' stadium.

The Hounds hosted their Inaugural FanFest on Sunday, February 13, 2011. The event was attended by approximately 9,800 fans. Baseball legends such as Frank Howard, Tommy John, Boog Powell, Cecil Fielder, Bobby Richardson, among about 15 others, appeared for autographs and panel discussions at Stone Bridge High School. The team's mascot Fetch was also publicly introduced at FanFest by noted broadcast personality Johnny Holliday.

Initially expected to begin play with the 2012 season with the new ballpark's completion, delays forced by the timeline of the team's land development partner motivated a relocation of the planned 5,500-seat facility to the One Loudoun development, announced in October 2012.

In April 2013, Loudoun County's Board of Supervisors cast a unanimous vote in favor of a rezoning application filed by One Loudoun, allowing the special events venue to be constructed at the site. The facility would have been immediately visible from the southwestern corner of the interchange of Virginia Route 7 and the Loudoun County Parkway.

Ground was broken for Edelman Financial Field on June 4, 2013, with the franchise's inaugural year anticipated for 2014. As of November 27, 2013, according to The Washington Post, it appeared that only minor work had been done on the One Loudoun site, but there was nothing which looked like the beginning of a baseball stadium. On November 27, CEO and Chairman Bob Farren, the team's primary backer, stepped down; on December 9 the team announced they would not play in 2014 due to the delays in their stadium's construction.

One Loudoun sued to terminate the lease with VIP Sports and Entertainment in September 2014, citing VIP's failure to deliver a stadium by an April 2014 deadline. The lawsuit was settled in February 2016 with the lease being terminated. In April 2018 One Loudoun sought to rezone the stadium site for a mix of restaurants, retail, offices and homes.

There were reports in January 2017 of a fresh attempt to bring baseball to Loudoun by a new group, including former Redskins quarterback Joe Theisman and sportscaster Johnny Holliday, possibly in the Atlantic League, and perhaps as early as 2018, however it never came into fruition.

== Logos and uniforms ==
Chosen by fan voting in September 2010, the name "Hounds" reflected the foxhunting and equestrian traditions of Loudoun County. It was a fusion of many hound-related names submitted by fans, including "foxhounds" after the Virginia state dog. Among other candidate names were Dulles Blue Heron and Virginia Silver Stars.

The team's name, logo, and uniforms were unveiled on September 21, 2010, with Hall of Famer Harmon Killebrew, who played for the Washington Senators, among several hundred attendance. In 2013 another former member of the Washington Senators, Frank Howard, was listed on the team's web site as the franchise's official Baseball Ambassador. The team's colors were to be maroon, black, khaki, and ecru. The primary logo consisted of a stylized canine face with a baseball in the mouth, with the "Loudoun Hounds" wordmark centered above.

The Hounds' uniforms, to be manufactured by Under Armour, were traditional in design. The home cap was black with a maroon button, and the interlocking "LH" logo centered on the front in maroon, khaki, and white. The home jerseys were white with traditional black piping. The "Hounds" wordmark was centered across the front of the jersey in maroon, outlined in khaki. The numbers front and back were black outlined in maroon with the ends of the numbers shaped like dog bones. The away jersey was maroon with khaki piping and the "Loudoun" wordmark centered across the front in black, outlined in khaki and white.
