= Loudoun School for Advanced Studies =

Location
- 601 Catoctin Circle, Davis Cottage #613; Leesburg, Virginia, Virginia 20176; United States; 39.0174°N 77.4553°W

Information
- Type: Private
- Motto: Where Curious Students Belong
- Established: 2008; 18 years ago
- CEEB code: 470138
- Director: Meghan Marinos |url=https://www.loudounschool.org/faculty/ |website=Loudoun School for Advanced
- Faculty: 16
- Grades: 6-12
- Enrollment: 50 (2024)
- Student to teacher ratio: 4:1
- Colors: Red, black
- Mascot: The Groundhogs
- Website: www.loudounschool.org

Loudoun School for Advanced Studies (LSAS) is a private school in Leesburg, Virginia United States and is designed to inspire and challenge advanced students in grades 6-12.

Students from LSAS worked to rehabilitate the historic Ashburn Colored School, which is located on the same property where LSAS has built its new campus.

== Covid-19 Plan ==
LSAS follows CDC guidelines and has a policy informed by the Virginia Council of Private Education and the Governor’s Phase Guidance for Virginia Schools. Steps taken to combat the risk of Covid-19 infection include:

- Installation of hospital grade UV-C air disinfection system
- Video conferencing capability in all classrooms and meeting spaces
- Daily health screening
- Face covering requirement for all teachers and students
- Small classes and large open meeting areas
- Improved sanitizing practices
