= Ashburn Colored School =

Coordinates: 39.047737°N 77.486348°W

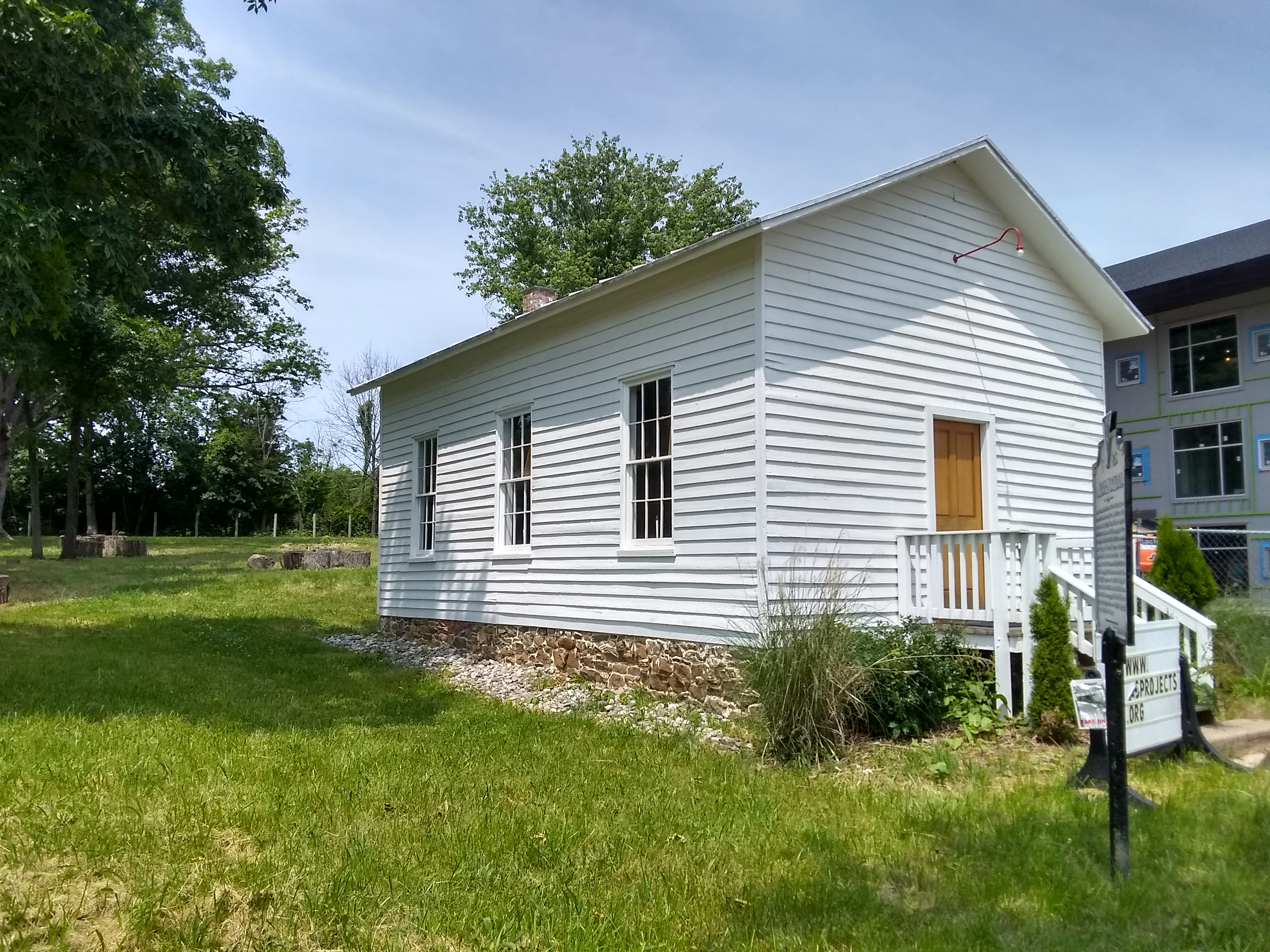

Location
- 20593 Ashburn Road; Ashburn, Virginia 20147

Information
- Former names: Colored School #A, Cedar Lane Colored School, Farmwell Colored School
- Established: 1887 or 1892
- Closed: 1958
- Grades: 1-7

The Ashburn Colored School is a former one-room schoolhouse for black students located at 20593 Ashburn Road in Ashburn, Virginia. Constructed in the late 19th century, it was in use until 1958. In the 21st century it has been restored after being dilapidated and vandalized.

== History ==
The frame building was constructed in either 1887 (for $400) or 1892 (for $500) as a one-room school for black ("colored") children under segregation. It was initially called Colored School #A or Cedar Lane Colored School; in 1892 it was sold to the Broad Run School District and from then to 1896 was called Farmwell Colored School. Up to 50 students in Grades 1 to 7 were taught there until 1958; in 1959 the property was sold at auction.

Loudoun School For The Gifted purchased the building as part of the site for a new school in 2014, and a group of students began restoring it in 2016. After a vandalism incident in 2016, $100,000 was raised through donations and the renovation was completed and the building opened as a museum, with a dedication ceremony held in September 2017 attended by at least one former student and the brother of the last teacher. Seventh-grade students at Farmwell Station Middle School successfully obtained grants and applied to the Virginia Department of Historic Resources for a historical marker at the school.

== Vandalism incident ==
In September 2016, after the Loudoun School students had raised funds for over a year and had begun renovations by replacing the windows, the building was defaced with graffiti including swastikas, penises and breasts, dinosaurs, and slogans including "white power" and "brown power" slogans by five 16- and 17-year-olds, two of them white and the other three minorities. In February 2017 they were ordered by a judge to read one book a month for the next year from a list of 35 books on experiences of discrimination and write a report on each, to listen to an oral history account by a former student at the Ashburn School, to visit the Holocaust Museum and the exhibit on Japanese American internment camps at the Smithsonian Museum of American History in Washington, D.C., and write a final 3,500-word essay about the effects of swastikas and white power slogans on African Americans and on the community as a whole, including references to Nazism, lynching, and legal discrimination. Alejandra Rueda, a prosecutor and deputy commonwealth attorney, proposed and worked out the alternative remedy in the belief that education would be more effective than community service, recalling her own upbringing in Guadalajara, Mexico, when she learned about discrimination by reading, beginning with books chosen by her librarian mother. A teacher objected to the use of reading as punishment, and some, particularly members of the black community, saw the disposition as lenient, but Rueda argued that it was more demanding than what juveniles with no prior criminal record would normally receive. The county has since reformed its juvenile justice system and a younger boy has received a reading sentence modeled on the Ashburn School disposition.
