= Arcola Elementary School =

Historic building in Virginia, US

- U.S. National Register of Historic Places
- Virginia Landmarks Register
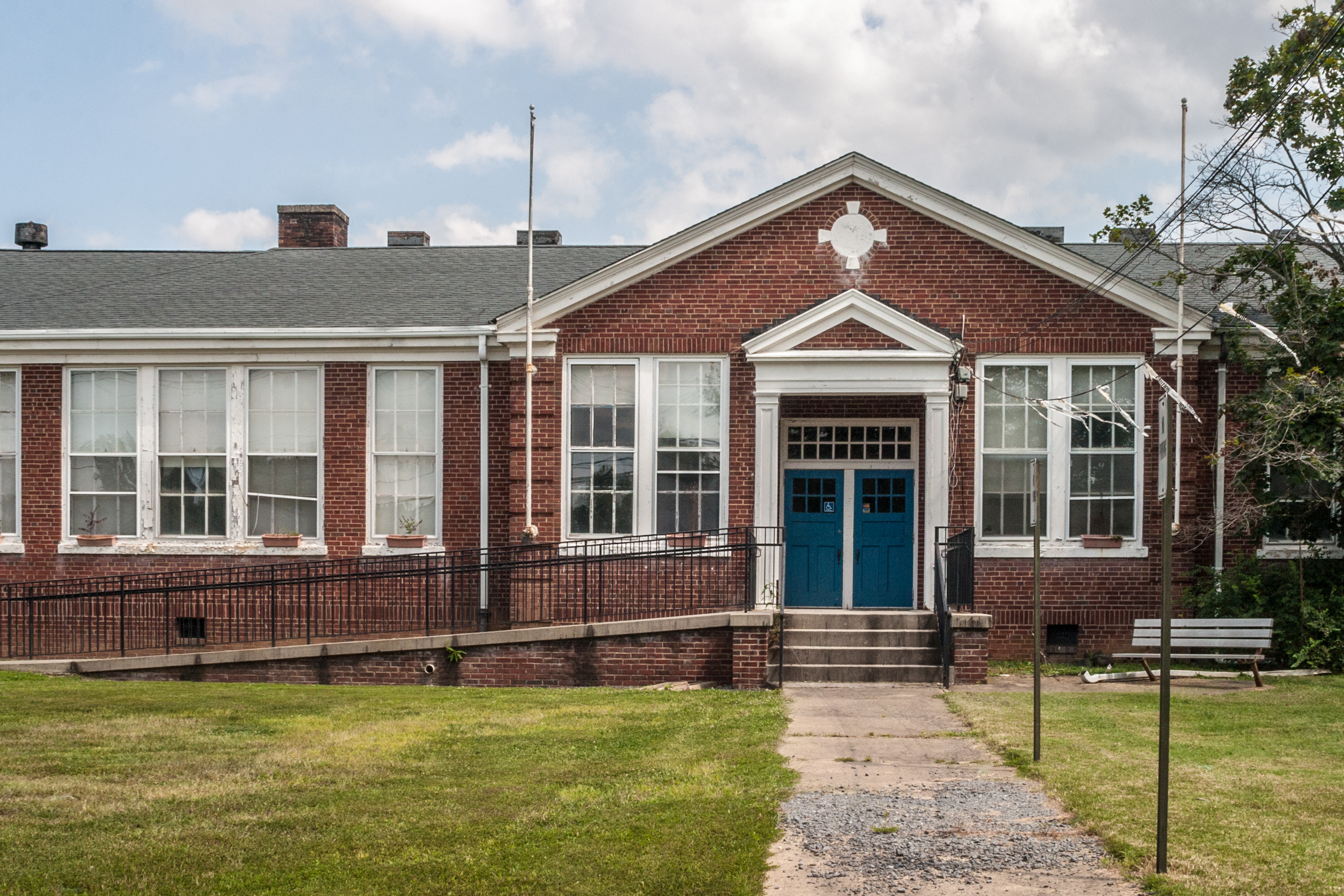

- Location within Northern Virginia Location within Virginia Location within the United States
- Location: 24244 Gum Spring Rd, Sterling, Virginia
- Coordinates: 38°56′52″N 77°32′13″W
- Area: 5 acres (2.0 ha)
- Built: 1939, 1951, 1956
- Architectural style: Colonial Revival
- NRHP reference No.: 13000363
- VLR No.: 053 -0982
- Added to NRHP: June 5, 2013

Arcola Elementary School is a historic elementary school building located at Arcola, Loudoun County, Virginia. It was originally built in 1939, as a six-room, one-story, Colonial Revival style school as part of the Public Works Administration building campaign. It has a hipped roof and projecting central pavilion with pediment frontispiece and recessed entrance. Flanking classroom wings were added in 1939, 1951, and 1956. It remained in use as a school into the 1970s, when it was re-opened as the Arcola Community Center.

It was listed on the National Register of Historic Places in 2013.
