= Edelman Financial Field =

Former planned stadium in Ashburn, Virginia

- Interactive map of Edelman Financial Field
- Location: Ashburn, Virginia
- Coordinates: 39°3′18.3708″N 77°27′10.6956″W
- Owner: VIP Sports & Entertainment
- Operator: VIP Baseball
- Capacity: 4,000
- Surface: FieldTurf

Construction
- Groundbreaking: June 4, 2013
- Opened: 2015 (planned opening)
- Architect: Clarke Caton Hintz (CCH)

Tenants
- Loudoun Hounds; Virginia Cavalry FC

Edelman Financial Field was a planned 4,000-seat multisport stadium in Ashburn, Virginia, within the Washington D.C. metropolitan area, that would have hosted the Loudoun Hounds of the Atlantic League of Professional Baseball and Virginia Cavalry FC of the North American Soccer League.

== Plan ==
The facility was to be part of One Loudoun, a multimillion-dollar residential and entertainment development designed to be the downtown area of Loudoun County.

== Uses ==
Along with the Loudoun Hounds and the Virginia Cavalry, the stadium would have served as a centerpiece for the area as an entertainment venue for concerts and other events.

== Naming rights ==
Ric Edelman’s Fairfax-based Edelman Financial Services bought the naming rights to the site and would have held an office at One Loudoun. The stadium's name was announced on June 4, 2013, the same day that ground was broken.

== Background ==
Kincora Village developers first petitioned Loudoun County officials in December 2008 to build a ballpark at its 337-acre (136.379-hectare) multi-use development near the intersections of Routes 28 and 7, in close proximity to the Dulles Town Center and the Washington Dulles International Airport. The original "Kincora Ballpark" was approved at that location by the Loudoun County Board of Supervisors in July, 2010.

On October 1, 2012 it was announced that the Loudoun Hounds had signed a new agreement to be located in the One Loudoun development in Ashburn and would no longer be located in Kincora. In April 2013, Loudoun County's Board of Supervisors cast a unanimous vote in favor of a rezoning application filed by One Loudoun, allowing the special events venue to be constructed at the site. The facility would have been immediately visible from the southwestern corner of the interchange of Virginia Route 7 and the Loudoun County Parkway.

Ground was broken on June 4, 2013. As of November 27, 2013, according to The Washington Post, it appeared that some work had been done on the One Loudoun site, but there was nothing which looked like the beginning of a baseball stadium.

In February 2014, it was reported that the stadium would be constructed in phases in response to a league request to downsize so that expected revenue would support the franchise. At that time the stadium was planned to be ready by late February or early March 2015 with about 4,000 seats. It was reported in April 2014 that the infrastructure work for the stadium was completed "last year" and since then "stadium construction has come to a halt."

A new stadium financing proposal was reported in April 2014 with the team asking the Loudoun County Economic Development Authority to issue up to $55 million in taxable revenue bonds that would not be backed by the county. This would have required support from the Board of Supervisors because the Authority can only issue tax-exempt bonds.

One Loudoun sued to terminate the lease with VIP Sports and Entertainment in September 2014, citing VIP's failure to deliver a stadium by an April 2014 deadline. The lawsuit was settled in February 2016 with the lease being terminated.

A local blog reported in April 2018 that One Loudoun was seeking to rezone the stadium site for a mix of restaurants, retail, offices and homes.
