= Ashburn Presbyterian Church =

Presbyterian church in Virginia, USA

- U.S. National Register of Historic Places
- Virginia Landmarks Register
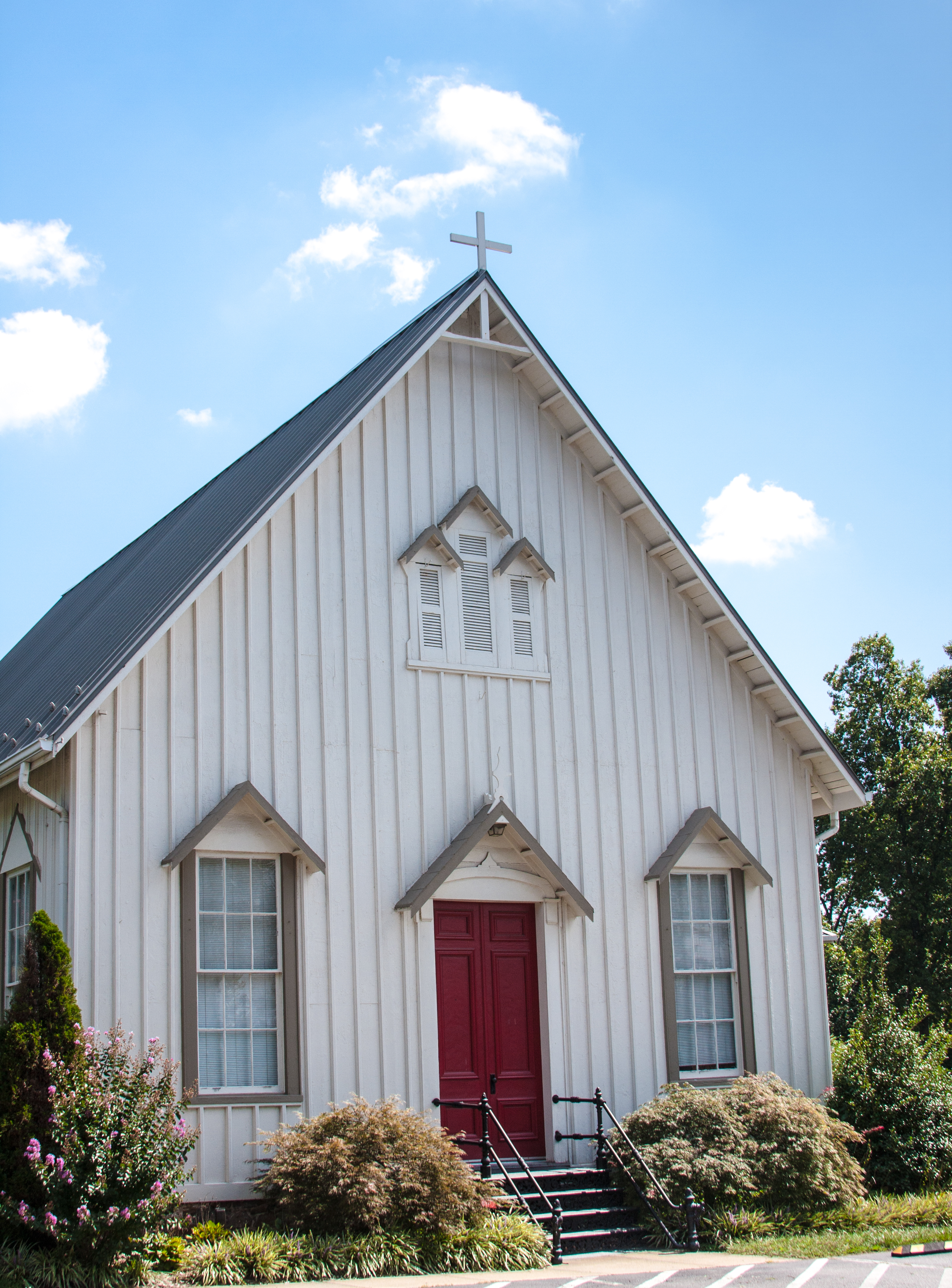
- Ashburn Presbyterian Church, August 2012

- Location within Northern Virginia Location within Virginia Location within the United States
- Location: 20962 Ashburn Rd., Ashburn, Virginia
- Coordinates: 39.03867°N 77.48515°W
- Area: 10.3 acres (4.2 ha)
- Built: 1878
- Architectural style: Carpenter Gothic
- NRHP reference No.: 99000962
- VLR No.: 053-0894

Significant dates
- Added to NRHP: August 5, 1999
- Designated VLR: June 16, 1999

Ashburn Presbyterian Church is a historic Presbyterian church located in Ashburn, Loudoun County, Virginia. It was built in 1878, and is a one-story, rectangular wood-frame building in the Carpenter Gothic style. The church measures 33 feet wide by 50 feet long, and is topped by a steep gable roof.

It was listed on the National Register of Historic Places in 1999.
