= Loudoun Gateway station =

Washington Metro station in Virginia, US

Loudoun Gateway
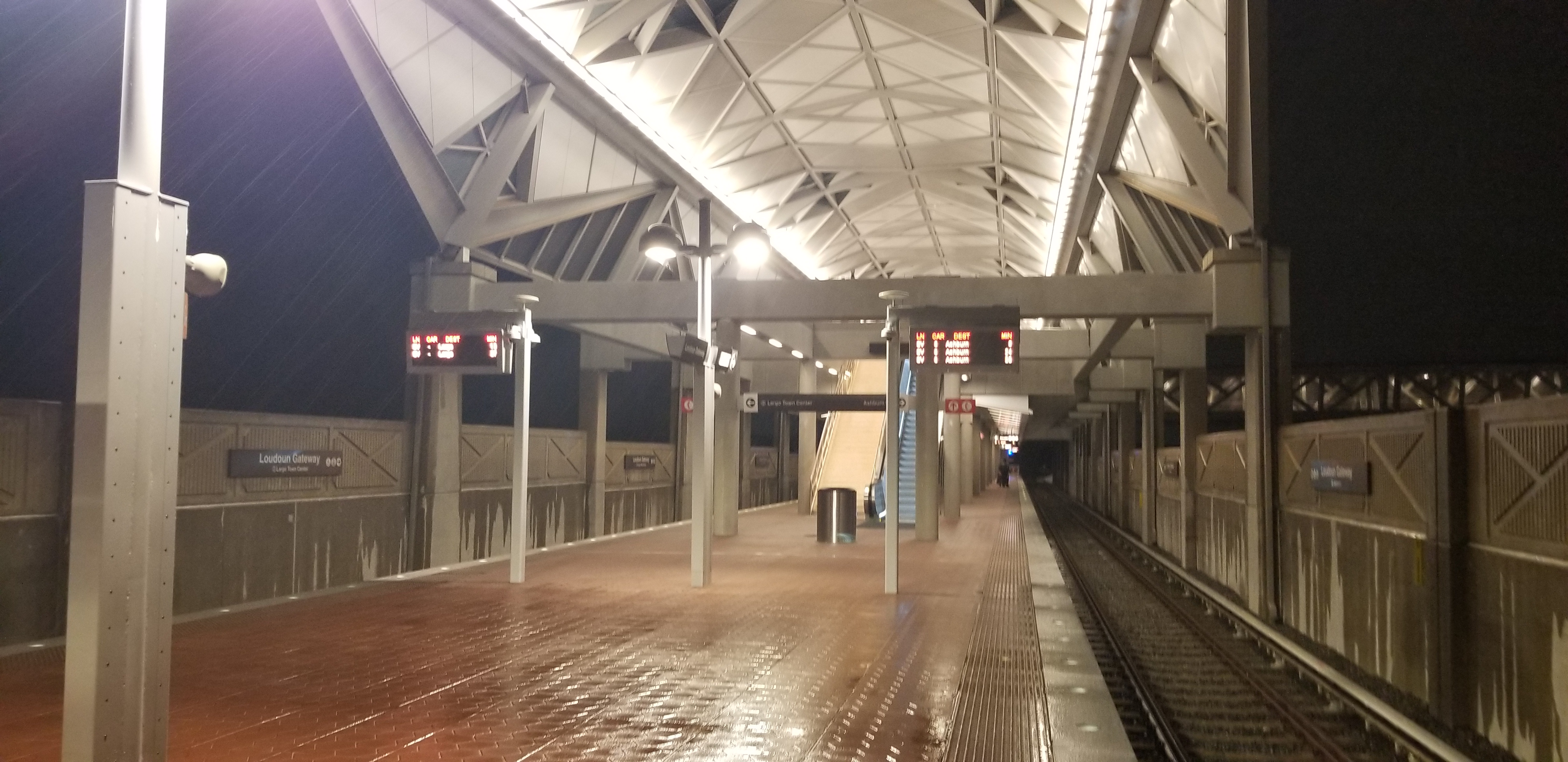
- Loudoun Gateway station in November 2022

General information
- Location: 22505 Lockridge Road; Sterling, Virginia
- Coordinates: 38°59′34″N 77°27′42″W
- Owner: Washington Metropolitan Area Transit Authority
- Platforms: 1 island platform
- Tracks: 2
- Connections: Loudoun County Transit bus: 333, 381, 382, 481, 482, 484, 486, 881, 882, 884, 885, 886

Construction
- Structure type: At-grade
- Parking: 2,000 spaces
- Cycle facilities: 113 racks, 10 lockers
- Accessible: Yes

Other information
- Station code: N11

History
- Opened: November 15, 2022

Passengers
- 2025: 445 (average weekday)
- Rank: 98 of 98

Services
Preceding station	Washington Metro	Following station
Ashburn Terminus	Silver Line	Dulles International Airport toward Downtown Largo or New Carrollton
Route map
Location

Loudoun Gateway station is a Washington Metro station in Loudoun County, Virginia, United States, on the Silver Line. It is located at Old Ox Road (SR 606) in the median of the Dulles Greenway (SR 267). The station opened on November 15, 2022. It has a bridge crossing to the north side of SR 267, leading to a parking lot and garage, a kiss and ride lot, and bus bays. In 2025, it had the lowest average weekday ridership of all stations in the system, averaging 362 daily boardings.

== History ==
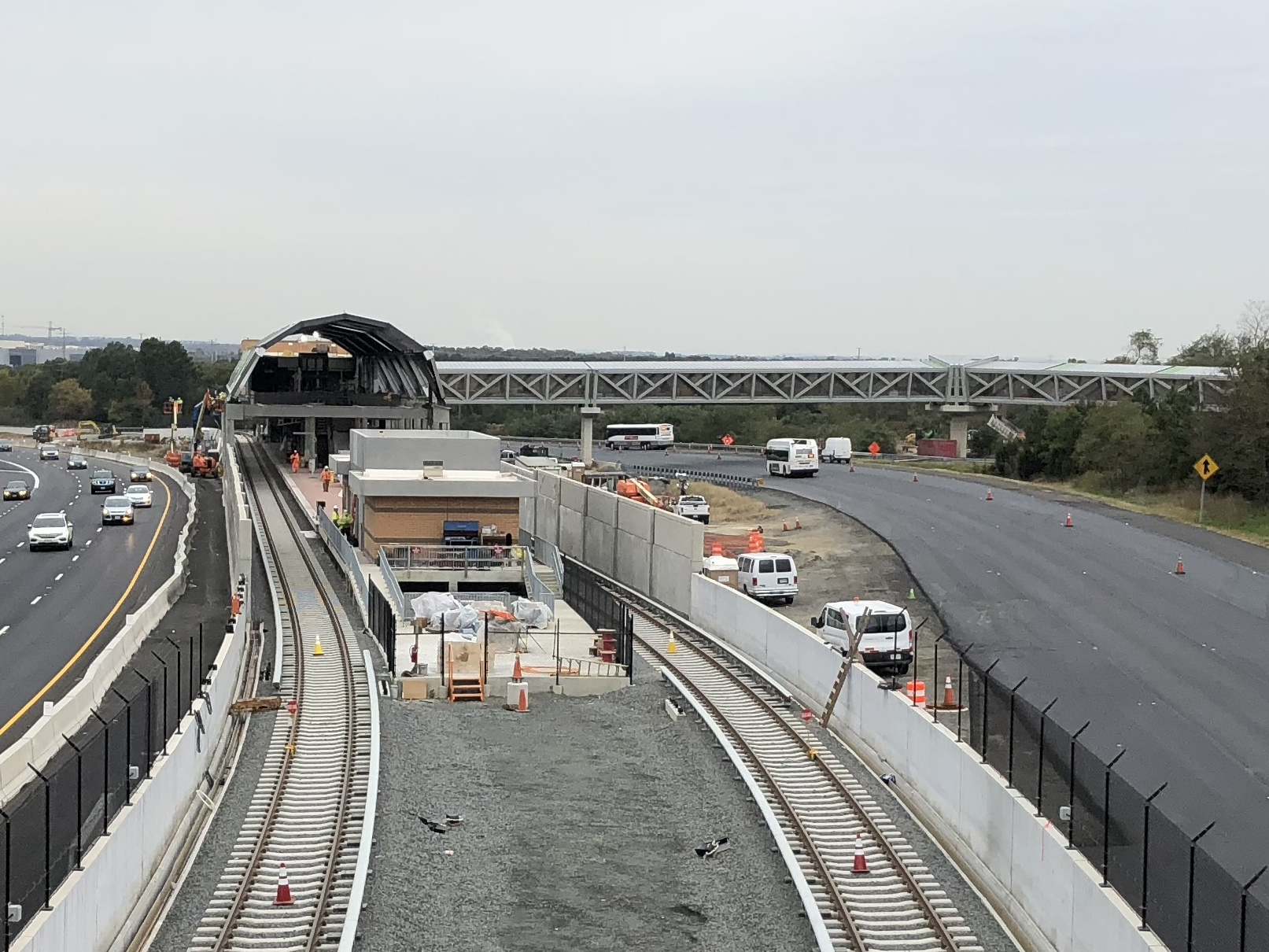
The station under construction in October 2018

The Silver Line was developed in the 21st century to link Washington, D.C., by rail to Washington Dulles International Airport and the edge cities of Tysons, Reston, Herndon, and Ashburn. It was built in two phases; the first phase, linking Washington, D.C., to Wiehle–Reston East, opened in July 2014. The funding and planning of Phase 2 through Dulles Airport continued while Phase 1 was being constructed. In July 2012, the Loudoun County Board of Supervisors voted 5 to 4 to extend the line to Dulles Airport and into the county. On April 25, 2013, the Phase 2 contract was issued at a cost of $1.177 billion.

In April 2015, project officials pushed back the opening date for the station to late 2019, stating that stricter requirements for stormwater management caused much of the delay. Per officials, the line also had to incorporate improvements to the system's automated train controls that were a late addition to the project's first phase. Around the same time as this announcement, the Washington Metropolitan Area Transit Authority (WMATA) approved the Loudoun County Board of Supervisors' name for the stop. The station was previously referred to as Route 606 in planning documents.

In August 2019, project officials reported that they expected construction on the second phase of the Silver Line to be completed by mid-2020. The opening date was postponed to early 2021, then to late 2021. In February 2021, Metro announced that it would need five months to test the Phase 2 extension. The Metropolitan Washington Airports Authority (MWAA) then announced that the Phase 2 extension should be substantially complete by Labor Day 2021, although MWAA subsequently missed this deadline.

MWAA declared the work on the rail line to be "substantially complete" in November 2021. However, WMATA estimated that it could take five months of testing and other preparations before passenger service could begin. Simulated service testing began operating along the Phase 2 tracks in October 2022. Phase 2 opened on November 15, 2022.

The Dulles North Transit Center, a park and ride bus terminal for Loudoun County Transit, was located slightly to the east of Loudoun Gateway station. It closed on December 5, 2022, and was replaced with the Dulles Transit Center in Sterling. On April 1, 2026, commuter bus service was relocated from Dulles Transit Center to Loudoun Gateway station for better connections with the Metro and local bus routes along with free parking in the parking garage.

By 2024, Loudon Gateway was the least-used station on the system with 317 daily riders – barely half that of the second-least-used (Cheverly). Although the station had been intended to support mixed-use transit-oriented development, several factors interfered. The COVID-19 pandemic reduced ridership and development demand, land became more valuable for building data centers than other uses, and a 2012 county zoning rule prohibited residential construction due to the proximity of Dulles Airport.
