= Brambleton, Virginia =

- Census-designated place
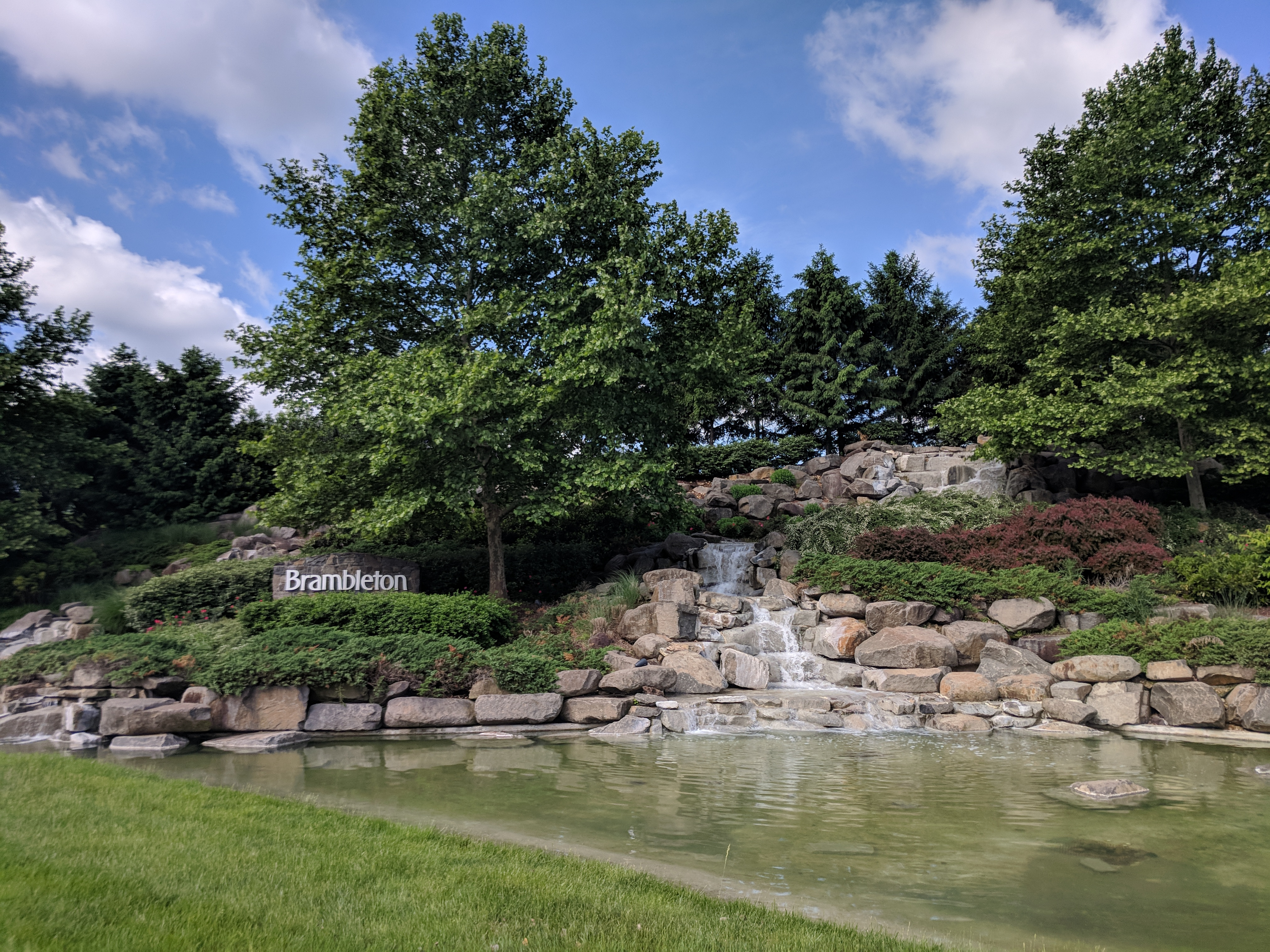
- Main entrance to Brambleton

- Location within Northern Virginia Location within Virginia Location within the United States
- Coordinates: 38°58′55″N 77°32′19″W
- Country: United States
- State: Virginia
- County: Loudoun

Area
  - Total: 5.81 sq mi (15.04 km^{2})
  - Land: 5.75 sq mi (14.90 km^{2})
  - Water: 0.050 sq mi (0.13 km^{2})
- Elevation: 380 ft (120 m)

Population (2020)
  - Total: 23,486
  - Density: 4,080/sq mi (1,576/km^{2})
- Time zone: UTC−5 (Eastern (EST))
  - Summer (DST): UTC−4 (EDT)
- ZIP code: 20148
- Area codes: 571 and 703
- FIPS code: 51-09188
- GNIS feature ID: 2584813

Brambleton is a census-designated place (CDP) in Loudoun County, Virginia, United States, south of the Dulles Greenway. As of the 2020 census, Brambleton had a population of 23,486. Construction started on the Brambleton community in 2001.

== Geography ==
Brambleton is located in southeastern Loudoun County, 11 miles (18 km) south of Leesburg, the county seat, and 1.3 mi (2.1 km) northwest of Washington Dulles International Airport. It is 33 miles (53 km) by highway west of downtown Washington, D.C. Neighboring communities counted by the U.S. Census Bureau include Broadlands to the north, Moorefield or Moorefield Station to the northeast, Loudoun Valley Estates to the east, and Arcola to the south. To the west is rural or low-density suburban land.

According to the Census Bureau, the Brambleton CDP has a total area of 5.8 square miles (15.0 km^{2}), of which 0.04 square miles (0.1 km^{2}), or 0.88%, are water. The community drains north to Beaverdam Run and east to Broad Run, both part of the Potomac River watershed.

== Demographics ==
Historical population
| Census | Pop. | Note | %± |
|---|---|---|---|
| 2010 | 9,845 | | — |
| 2020 | 23,486 | | 138.6% |
U.S. Decennial Census; 2010 2020

Brambleton was first listed as a census designated place in the 2010 U.S. census.

=== Racial and ethnic composition ===
Brambleton, Virginia – Racial and Ethnic Composition (NH = Non-Hispanic) Note: the US Census treats Hispanic/Latino as an ethnic category. This table excludes Latinos from the racial categories and assigns them to a separate category. Hispanics/Latinos may be of any race.
| Race / ethnicity | Pop 2010 | Pop 2020 | % 2010 | % 2020 |
|---|---|---|---|---|
| White alone (NH) | 5,596 | 9,181 | 56.84% | 39.09% |
| Black or African American alone (NH) | 647 | 1,740 | 6.57% | 7.41% |
| Native American or Alaska Native alone (NH) | 18 | 32 | 0.18% | 0.14% |
| Asian alone (NH) | 2,546 | 9,292 | 25.86% | 39.56% |
| Pacific Islander alone (NH) | 7 | 13 | 0.07% | 0.06% |
| Some Other Race alone (NH) | 17 | 106 | 0.17% | 0.45% |
| Mixed Race/Multi-Racial (NH) | 436 | 1,301 | 4.43% | 5.54% |
| Hispanic or Latino (any race) | 578 | 1,821 | 5.87% | 7.75% |
| Total | 9,845 | 23,486 | 100% | 100% |

=== 2020 census ===
As of the 2020 census, Brambleton had a population of 23,486. The median age was 35.2 years. 34.1% of residents were under the age of 18 and 5.0% of residents were 65 years of age or older. For every 100 females there were 96.1 males, and for every 100 females age 18 and over there were 91.4 males age 18 and over.

99.9% of residents lived in urban areas, while 0.1% lived in rural areas.

There were 7,249 households in Brambleton, of which 60.6% had children under the age of 18 living in them. Of all households, 72.9% were married-couple households, 8.9% were households with a male householder and no spouse or partner present, and 14.8% were households with a female householder and no spouse or partner present. About 12.0% of all households were made up of individuals and 2.8% had someone living alone who was 65 years of age or older.

There were 7,435 housing units, of which 2.5% were vacant. The homeowner vacancy rate was 1.2% and the rental vacancy rate was 2.8%.

Racial composition as of the 2020 census
| Race | Number | Percent |
|---|---|---|
| White | 9,526 | 40.6% |
| Black or African American | 1,790 | 7.6% |
| American Indian and Alaska Native | 47 | 0.2% |
| Asian | 9,316 | 39.7% |
| Native Hawaiian and Other Pacific Islander | 15 | 0.1% |
| Some other race | 526 | 2.2% |
| Two or more races | 2,266 | 9.6% |
| Hispanic or Latino (of any race) | 1,821 | 7.8% |

== Community design ==
Brambleton is a planned community located on 2,500 acres (10 km^{2}) of land near Ashburn in Loudoun County.

Brambleton is zoned for a full range of residential and commercial uses. The overall layout of Brambleton calls for over 9,000 residential units, including an active adult community, Birchwood at Brambleton; a Town Center with 300,000 square feet (28,000 m^{2}) of retail space and 200,000 square feet (19,000 m^{2}) of office space; an additional 150,000 square feet (14,000 m^{2}) of neighborhood retail and 20,000 square feet (1,900 m^{2}) of commercial office; and 1,760,000 square feet (164,000 m^{2}) of light industrial/flex space. Future commercial parcels are planned within Brambleton.

Brambleton was designed to incorporate traditional neighborhood features alongside pedestrian-oriented spaces and streetscapes. Currently the community includes four pools, over 18 miles (29 km) of public trails, parks, sports courts, and several Loudoun County public schools. Brambleton is also home to two Winwood childcare centers and two Chesterbrook Academy pre-schools.

== History ==
Brambleton is located at the site of the former community of Royville, which existed as early as 1908 at the intersection of Belmont Ridge Road and Creighton Road. Prior to 1908, the property on which parts of Brambleton exist today was part of Thomas Lewis’ plantation.

Developing the Brambleton planned community began in earnest in the spring of 1999, immediately after Brambleton Group L.L.C., a division of Soave Real Estate, acquired the property. Road improvements were necessary along Route 607/772 to connect Brambleton via the Loudoun County Parkway to Exit 7 of the Dulles Greenway.

Residents in the development are members of the Brambleton Community Association, a homeowners association.

== Town Center ==
The Town Center of Brambleton contains over 50 retail stores, restaurants, entertainment, doctors, public spaces and commercial offices. The Town Center serves as the location for the community's annual Sizzlin' Summer Concerts, Farmers' Market, Race Brambleton Series and other events and festivals.

== Schools ==
=== High schools ===
- Briar Woods High School
- Independence High School

=== Middle schools ===
- Brambleton Middle School
- Watson Mountain Middle School

=== Elementary schools ===
- Creighton's Corner Elementary
- Legacy Elementary School
- Madison's Trust Elementary School

== See also ==
- Arcola Slave Quarters
