= Waxpool, Virginia =

Unincorporated community in Virginia, United States

- Unincorporated community
- Location within Northern Virginia Location within Virginia Location within the United States
- Coordinates: 39°0′50″N 77°31′26″W
- Country: United States
- State: Virginia
- County: Loudoun
- Time zone: UTC−5 (Eastern (EST))
  - Summer (DST): UTC−4 (EDT)

Waxpool is an unincorporated community in Loudoun County, Virginia, United States. Waxpool is centered on Waxpool Road (Virginia Secondary Route 625) in the vicinity of Beaver Dam Reservoir and is part of the Broadlands census-designated place.

Waxpool once contained a general store and post office in one building near the intersection of Waxpool Road (Rte. 625) and Belmont Ridge Rd (Rte. 659). The store and was reportedly opened in 1947. The post office was reportedly opened in 1953. Both the store and post office continued operation until 1966.

Waxpool currently contains William D. Parsell Field, baseball field. Formerly named "Waxpool Baseball Field", it is currently named for the former owner and lessor of the field to Dulles Little League for use of the Waxpool Mustangs and Waxpool Orioles from the early 1970s through the early 1990s.

Waxpool's name was derived from the fact that much of the local soil is Iredell clay loam, known locally as "wax land" from the waxy nature of the subsoil.

Waxpool contained three dairy farms in the 1970s. Two of them were separately purchased and zoned for planned community development in the 1990s. One farm currently remains, located near the intersection of Waxpool Road (Rte. 625) and Belmont Ridge Rd (Rte. 659).
