= Arcola Slave Quarters =

Historic slave quarters in Virginia, United States

- U.S. National Register of Historic Places
- Virginia Landmarks Register
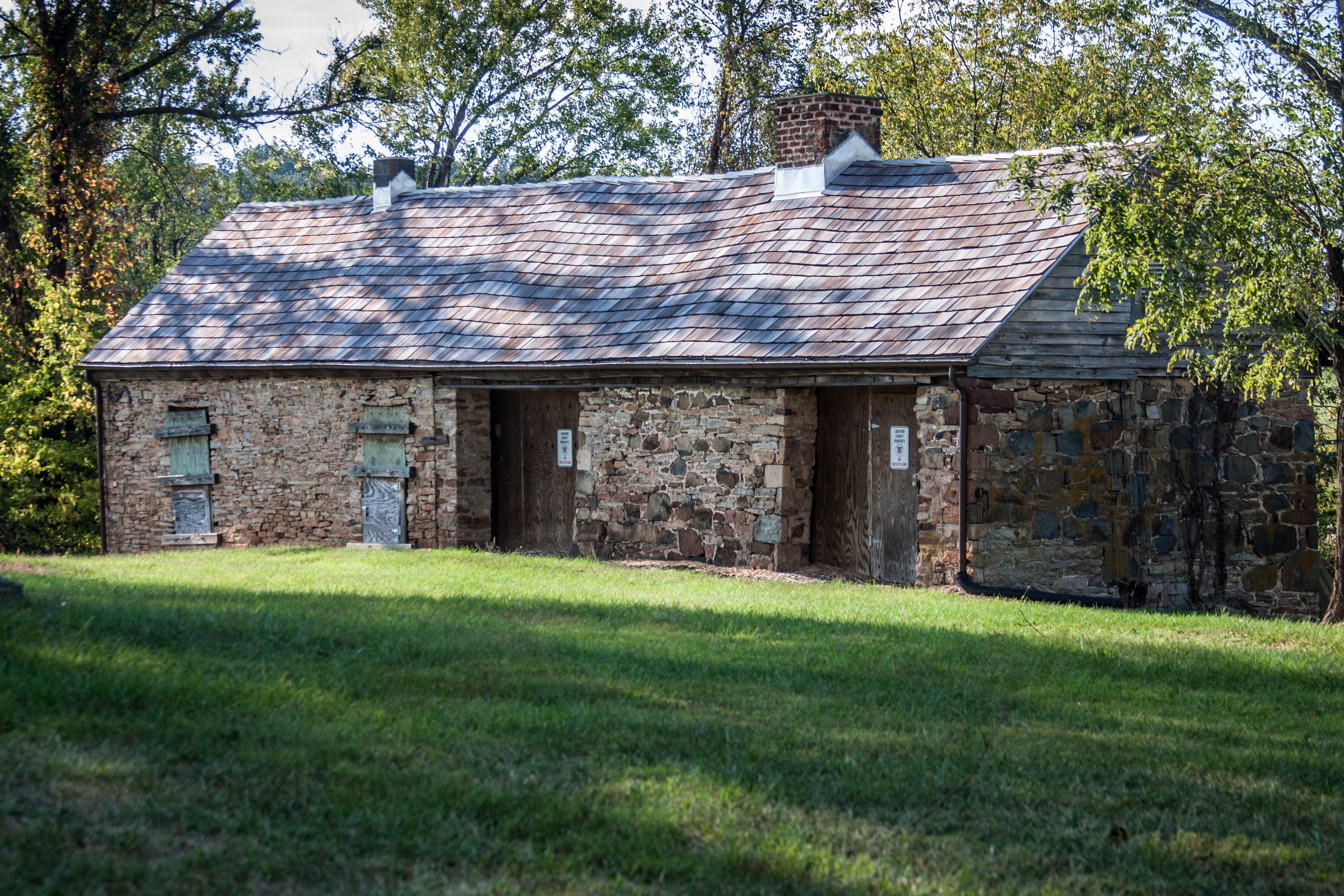
- Arcola Slave Quarters, September 2012

- Location within Northern Virginia Location within Virginia Location within the United States
- Location: 24837 Evergreen Mills Rd., Arcola, Virginia
- Coordinates: 38°56′54″N 77°31′41″W
- Area: 4.5 acres (1.8 ha)
- Built: 1800
- NRHP reference No.: 08001113
- VLR No.: 053-0984

Significant dates
- Added to NRHP: November 26, 2008
- Designated VLR: September 18, 2008

The Arcola Slave Quarters were built circa 1800 on the grounds of the Lewis plantation at Arcola in Loudoun County, Virginia. The plantation house was replaced by a different house in the 1930s on the original foundation, but the slave quarters remain. The stone structure is a double-pen building built into an embankment downhill from the main house. The western end is older, with two connecting rooms and a cellar, accessible through a hole in the floor. The eastern end consists of two rooms, connected to the original wing by a breezeway. Each block has a central chimney with two hearths. The walls are stone rubble construction with timber roof construction. A loft, probably a later addition, has been created in the attic space. The floors are dirt, except for the room over the cellar, which is wood. The roof is asphalt roll roofing over plywood, but traces of the older wood shake roof remain. There are several window openings which do not appear to have been glazed, but rather shuttered.

The Lewis plantation was established between 1744 and 1746 by Vincent Lewis, who owned a number of slaves, whose numbers increased with succeeding generations. The Lewis family sold the property for development in the 1980s.

The Arcola slave quarters were listed on the National Register of Historic Places on November 26, 2008 as local examples of extant slave quarters, and as an unusual example of stone slave quarters. The 1930s American Foursquare house is not considered a contributing structure.
