= Goose Creek Village, Virginia =

- Census-designated place
- Location within Northern Virginia Location within Virginia Location within the United States
- Coordinates: 39°2′40″N 77°31′21″W
- Country: United States
- State: Virginia
- County: Loudoun

Area
  - Total: 0.38 sq mi (0.98 km^{2})
  - Land: 0.38 sq mi (0.98 km^{2})
  - Water: 0 sq mi (0.0 km^{2})
- Elevation: 405 ft (123 m)
- Time zone: UTC−5 (Eastern (EST))
  - Summer (DST): UTC−4 (EDT)
- FIPS code: 51-31912
- GNIS feature ID: 2804163

Goose Creek Village is a census-designated place (CDP) in Loudoun County, Virginia, United States. It was first drawn as a CDP prior to the 2020 census, and as of the 2020 census had a population of 2,298.

== Geography ==
Goose Creek Village is east of the center of Loudoun County, on the west side of Belmont Ridge Road. The Dulles Greenway (Virginia Route 267) runs through the southern part of the CDP, leading northwest 7 miles (11 km) to Leesburg, the county seat, and southeast 10 miles (16 km) to Washington Dulles International Airport. The community is bordered to the east by Ashburn.

According to the U.S. Census Bureau, the Goose Creek Village CDP has a total area of 0.38 square miles (0.98 km^{2}), all land. The community sits on the west side of a ridge above Goose Creek, a north-flowing tributary of the Potomac River.

== Demographics ==
Goose Creek Village first appeared as a census designated place in the 2020 U.S. census.
