= Moorefield, Virginia =

Moorefield, Virginia Moorefield Station
- Census-designated place
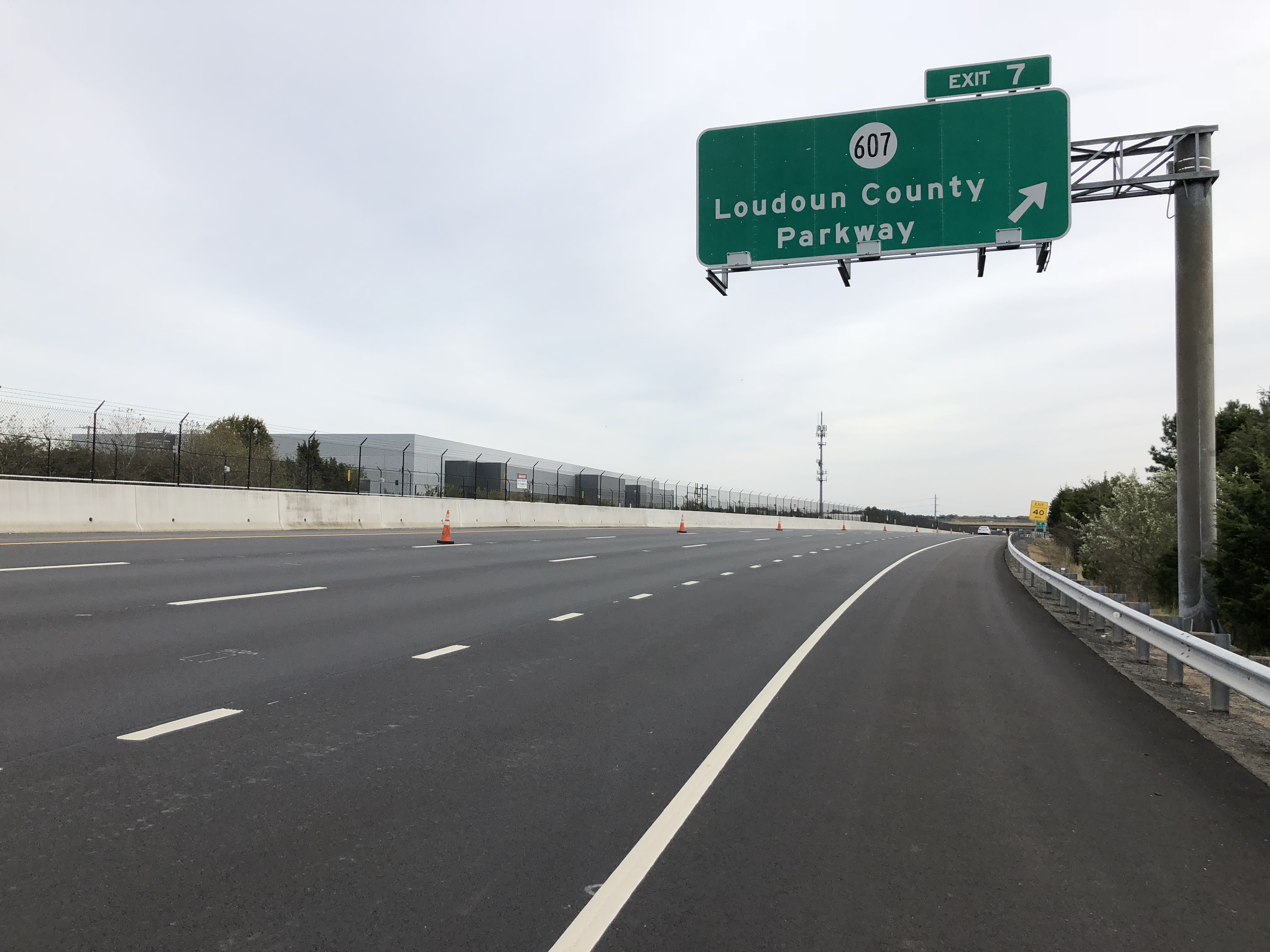
- SR 267 forms the northeast edge of Moorefield, with an exit at the Loudoun County Parkway providing direct access.

- Location within Northern Virginia Location within Virginia Location within the United States
- Coordinates: 39°0′1″N 77°29′47″W
- Country: United States
- State: Virginia
- County: Loudoun

Area
  - Total: 1.14 sq mi (2.94 km^{2})
  - Land: 1.14 sq mi (2.94 km^{2})
  - Water: 0 sq mi (0.0 km^{2})
- Elevation: 280 ft (85 m)

Population (2010)
  - Total: 77
- Time zone: UTC−5 (Eastern (EST))
  - Summer (DST): UTC−4 (EDT)
- ZIP code: 20148 (Ashburn)
- FIPS code: 51-53030
- GNIS feature ID: 2584884

Moorefield is a census-designated place (CDP) in Loudoun County, Virginia, United States. As of the 2020 census, Moorefield had a population of 4,421. As of the 2010 census, the CDP was named Moorefield Station. Moorefield is a mixed-use development currently in progress, located at the Ashburn station at the western terminus of the Metrorail Silver Line.

== Geography ==
Moorefield is in the Ashburn portion of eastern Loudoun County, on the southwest side of the Dulles Greenway (Virginia State Route 267). It is bordered to the northeast by Ashburn proper, to the northwest and west by Brambleton, and the south by Loudoun Valley Estates. It is 10 miles (16 km) south of Leesburg, the Loudoun county seat, and 31 miles (50 km) west-northwest of Washington, D.C.

According to the U.S. Census Bureau, the Moorefield CDP has a total area of 1.1 square miles (2.9 km^{2}), of which 2,166 square metres (0.5 acres), or 0.07%, are water. The area drains southeast toward Broad Run, a north-flowing tributary of the Potomac River.

== Demographics ==
Historical population
Census	Pop.	Note	%±
2010	77		—
2020	4,421		5,641.6%
U.S. Decennial Census; 2010 2020

Moorefield Station was first listed as a census designated place in the 2010 U.S. census.

=== 2020 census ===
As of the 2020 census, Moorefield had a population of 4,421. The median age was 33.7 years. 27.6% of residents were under the age of 18 and 4.4% of residents were 65 years of age or older. For every 100 females there were 96.2 males, and for every 100 females age 18 and over there were 97.7 males age 18 and over.

100.0% of residents lived in urban areas, while 0.0% lived in rural areas.

There were 1,622 households in Moorefield, of which 47.1% had children under the age of 18 living in them. Of all households, 60.7% were married-couple households, 16.6% were households with a male householder and no spouse or partner present, and 17.4% were households with a female householder and no spouse or partner present. About 19.2% of all households were made up of individuals and 2.2% had someone living alone who was 65 years of age or older.

There were 1,681 housing units, of which 3.5% were vacant. The homeowner vacancy rate was 0.5% and the rental vacancy rate was 4.1%.

Racial composition as of the 2020 census
Race	Number	Percent
White	1,686	38.1%
Black or African American	590	13.3%
American Indian and Alaska Native	10	0.2%
Asian	1,591	36.0%
Native Hawaiian and Other Pacific Islander	4	0.1%
Some other race	118	2.7%
Two or more races	422	9.5%
Hispanic or Latino (of any race)	354	8.0%
