= Arcola, Virginia =

- Census-designated place
- Location within Northern Virginia Location within Virginia Location within the United States
- Coordinates: 38°57′6″N 77°32′3″W
- Country: United States
- State: Virginia
- County: Loudoun

Area
  - Total: 2.31 sq mi (5.98 km^{2})
  - Land: 2.29 sq mi (5.92 km^{2})
  - Water: 0.023 sq mi (0.06 km^{2})
- Elevation: 285 ft (87 m)

Population (2020)
  - Total: 2,412
  - Estimate (2023): 2,858
  - Density: 1,055.2/sq mi (407.43/km^{2})
- Time zone: UTC−5 (Eastern (EST))
  - Summer (DST): UTC−4 (EDT)
- ZIP code: 20166
- FIPS code: 51-02248
- GNIS feature ID: 1492481

Arcola is a census-designated place in Loudoun County, Virginia, United States. The population as of the 2020 United States Census was 2,412.

== Geography ==
Arcola is in southeastern Loudoun County, on the north side of U.S. Route 50, which leads east 31 miles (50 km) to Washington, D.C., and northwest 42 miles (68 km) to Winchester. Leesburg, the Loudoun county seat, is 14 miles (23 km) north of Arcola, and the southwest runway of Washington Dulles International Airport is less than 3 miles (5 km) to the east.

According to the U.S. Census Bureau, the Arcola CDP has a total area of 2.3 square miles (6.0 km^{2}), of which 0.02 square miles (0.06 km^{2}), or 0.97%, are water. Arcola village is in the northern part of the CDP, along the South Fork of Broad Run, a north-flowing tributary of the Potomac River.

== History ==
The genesis of Arcola was a small spring next to a gum tree that fed into the south fork of Broad Run, suitably called "Gum Springs". During the colonial era a distillery, kiln and small church were established at the spring.

When Cameron Parish was established from Truro Parish, its glebe, the area reserved to support the parish priest, was established just northwest of the spring. The glebelands were sold off in 1802 when the Virginia General Assembly divested all Anglican glebes.

In 1801 the United States Post Office established a branch at the village, naming it "Springfield". The branch closed in 1819. Thirteen years later the Post Office once again saw fit to locate a branch in the vicinity, but the success of the Little River Turnpike (present day U.S. Route 50) dictated that it would be located on that road south of the village and known on local maps as simply "Arcola P.O." (situated near the present-day intersection of US 50 and Hwy 616/Fleetwood Rd). The branch was named "Arcola" in honor of the Arcola Farm on which it was built. That branch stayed open until 1868, when the office was located back within the confines of the village. The village itself, however, remained identified on local maps as "Gum Spring" during most of the 19th century.

In the 1850s Arcola had a brush with the big time when the construction of the Loudoun Branch of the Manassas Gap Railroad was completed on the northern border of the village. Unfortunately the Panic of 1857 and Civil War stopped the railroad from ever being used. During the Gettysburg campaign of June–July 1863, troops from the Union Army of the Potomac's 11th and 1st Corps marched and camped in and around the town of "Gum Spring" according to dispatches (present-day Arcola), as they meandered north toward Leesburg and into Maryland.

Unlike many other Loudoun villages, Arcola continued to grow well into the twentieth century. In 1876 the population was 30, in 1911 it was 90 and by 1976 it was 135.

John Franklin Ryan (1848–1936), former representative in the Virginia House of Delegates, is buried in the Darnes Cemetery in Arcola.

The Arcola Elementary School, Arcola Slave Quarters, and Fleetwood Farm are listed on the National Register of Historic Places.

== Demographics ==
Historical population
Census	Pop.	Note	%±
2010	233		—
2020	2,412		935.2%
2023 (est.)	2,858	▲	18.5%
U.S. Decennial Census; 2010 2020

Arcola was first listed as a census designated place in the 2010 U.S. census.
