= Broadlands, Virginia =

- Census-designated place
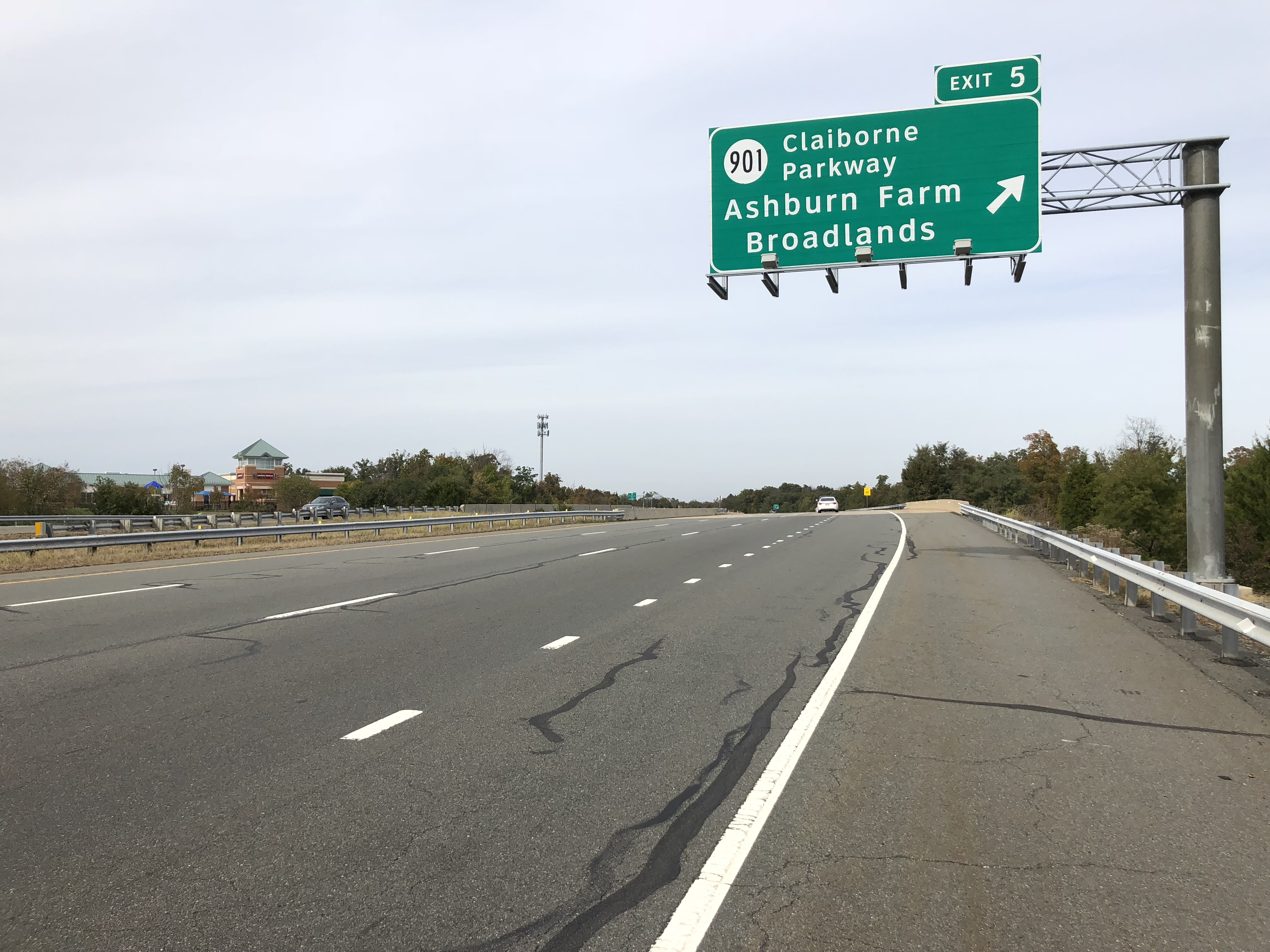
- SR 267 exit for Broadlands

- Location within Northern Virginia Location within Virginia Location within the United States
- Coordinates: 39°1′5″N 77°31′13″W
- Country: United States
- State: Virginia
- County: Loudoun

Area
  - Total: 3.25 sq mi (8.42 km^{2})
  - Land: 3.23 sq mi (8.37 km^{2})
  - Water: 0.015 sq mi (0.04 km^{2})
- Elevation: 363 ft (111 m)

Population (2010)
  - Total: 12,313
  - Density: 3,808/sq mi (1,470.4/km^{2})
- Time zone: UTC−5 (Eastern (EST))
  - Summer (DST): UTC−4 (EDT)
- ZIP code: 20148
- Area codes: 571 and 703
- FIPS code: 51-09952
- GNIS feature ID: 2584815

Broadlands is a census-designated place (CDP) in Loudoun County, Virginia, United States. It is a 1,500-acre (610 ha) master-planned community started and developed by Van Metre Homes in the 1990s. It is built on wetlands and is certified as a Community Wildlife Habitat by the National Wildlife Federation.

As of the 2020 census, Broadlands had a population of 14,021.

According to Data US, which includes US Census American Community Survey data, between 2012 and 2016 Broadlands had an estimated population of 13,872 people, with a median age of 33.9 and a median household income of $169,353.

== Homeowners association ==
The Broadlands community is managed by Broadlands Association, Inc., a homeowners association that incorporated in 1995. Its board of directors is composed of nine resident members. Broadlands became homeowner-controlled in 2009. Broadlands also includes two apartment complexes with rental units: The Arbors at Broadlands and the Van Metre Broadlands Apartments. The median property value in Broadlands is $569,800, and the homeownership rate is 85%.

== Education ==
Broadlands is home to four Loudoun County Public Schools: Hillside Elementary, Mill Run Elementary, Waxpool Elementary, and Eagle Ridge Middle School. High school students attend Briar Woods High School.

== Geography ==
Broadlands is located in eastern Loudoun County, just off the Dulles Greenway at Claiborne Parkway (Exit 5) or Ashburn Village Blvd/Moorview Parkway (Exit 6), midway between Dulles International Airport and the town of Leesburg, close to AOL's headquarters and other corporate centers. It is bordered to the northeast, across the Dulles Greenway, by Ashburn, and to the south it is bordered by Brambleton.

From the center of Broadlands, by car, it is 33 miles (53 km) to Washington DC and 9.3 miles (15.0 km) to the main terminal of Washington Dulles International Airport.

According to the U.S. Census Bureau, the Broadlands CDP has a total area of 3.2 square miles (8.4 km^{2}), of which 0.02 square miles (0.04 km^{2}), or 0.50%, are water. The CDP includes the pre-Broadlands community of Waxpool in the west. Most of the CDP drains via Beaverdam Run east toward Broad Run, a north-flowing tributary of the Potomac River. The westernmost part of the community drains west to Beaverdam Creek Reservoir, which flows to Goose Creek, another north-flowing tributary of the Potomac.

== Demographics ==
Historical population
Census	Pop.	Note	%±
2010	12,313		—
2020	14,021		13.9%
U.S. Decennial Census; 2010 2020

=== 2020 census ===
As of the 2020 census, Broadlands had a population of 14,021.

The median age was 35.9 years. 32.4% of residents were under the age of 18 and 5.3% of residents were 65 years of age or older. For every 100 females there were 97.5 males, and for every 100 females age 18 and over there were 96.3 males age 18 and over.

100.0% of residents lived in urban areas, while 0.0% lived in rural areas.

There were 4,228 households in Broadlands, of which 58.5% had children under the age of 18 living in them. Of all households, 74.6% were married-couple households, 8.9% were households with a male householder and no spouse or partner present, and 13.2% were households with a female householder and no spouse or partner present. About 11.1% of all households were made up of individuals and 2.3% had someone living alone who was 65 years of age or older.

There were 4,298 housing units, of which 1.6% were vacant. The homeowner vacancy rate was 0.2% and the rental vacancy rate was 3.8%.

Racial composition as of the 2020 census
Race	Number	Percent
White	8,012	57.1%
Black or African American	795	5.7%
American Indian and Alaska Native	14	0.1%
Asian	3,554	25.3%
Native Hawaiian and Other Pacific Islander	14	0.1%
Some other race	281	2.0%
Two or more races	1,351	9.6%
Hispanic or Latino (of any race)	1,102	7.9%

=== 2010 census ===
Broadlands was first listed as a census designated place in the 2010 U.S. census.
