= Ashburn, Virginia =

- Census-Designated Place
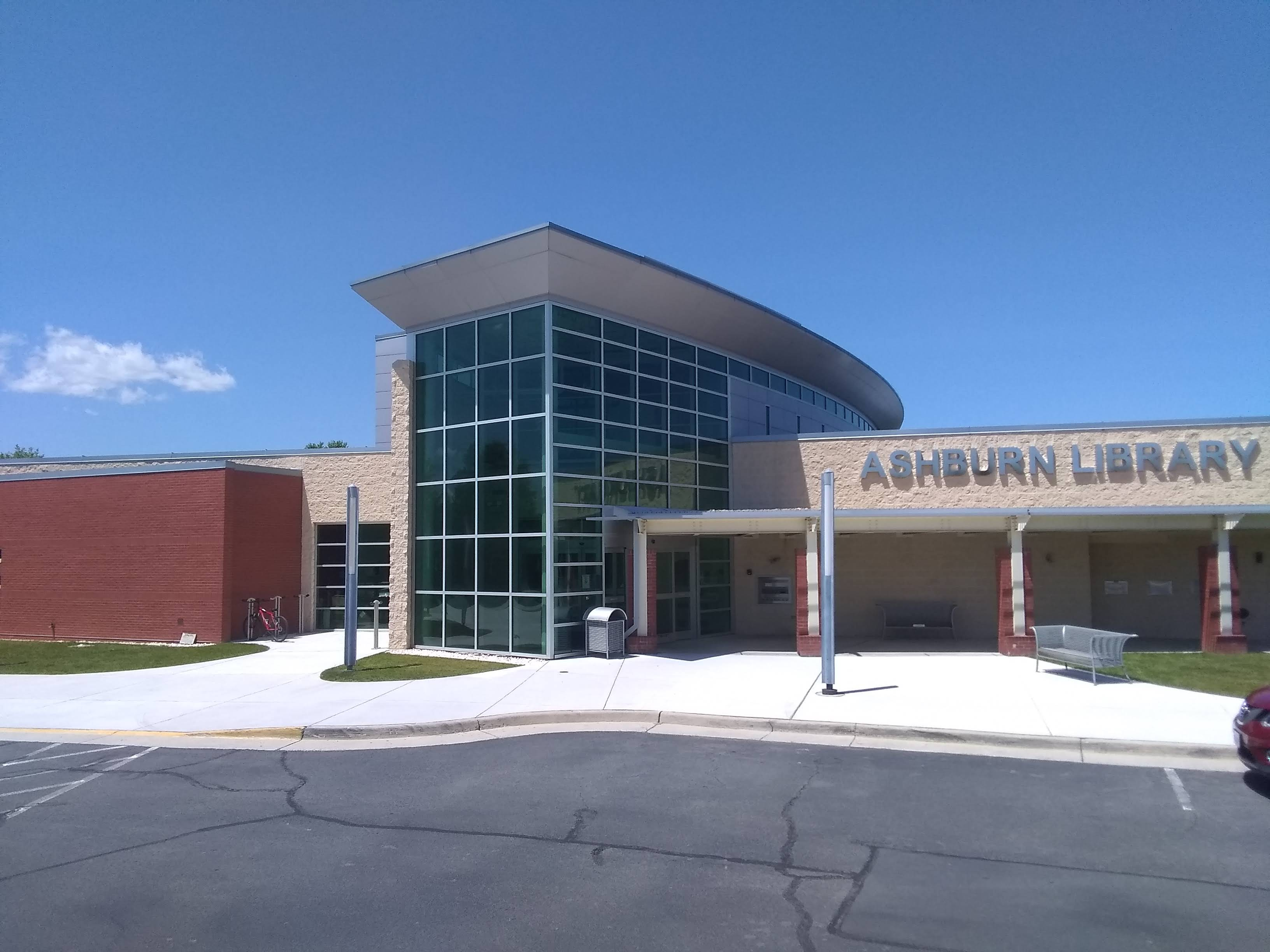
- Ashburn branch of the Loudoun County Public Library

- Location within Northern Virginia Location within Virginia Location within the United States
- Coordinates: 39°02′37″N 77°29′15″W
- Country: United States
- State: Virginia
- County: Loudoun

Area
  - Total: 15.55 sq mi (40.3 km^{2})
  - Land: 15.30 sq mi (39.6 km^{2})
  - Water: 0.25 sq mi (0.65 km^{2})
- Elevation: 253 ft (77 m)

Population (2020)
  - Total: 46,349
  - Density: 3,030.3/sq mi (1,170.0/km^{2})
- Time zone: UTC−5 (Eastern (EST))
  - Summer (DST): UTC−4 (EDT)
- ZIP codes: 20146, 20147, 20148, 20149
- Area codes: 703, 571
- FIPS code
- ANSI code: 2584799
- GNIS feature ID: 1499063; CDP: 2584799

Ashburn is an unincorporated settlement and census-designated place (CDP) in Loudoun County, Virginia, United States. At the 2020 United States census, its population was 46,349, up from 3,393 in 1990. It is 30 miles (48 km) northwest of Washington, D.C., and part of the Washington metropolitan area. Ashburn is a major hub for Internet traffic due to its many data centers.

== Etymology ==
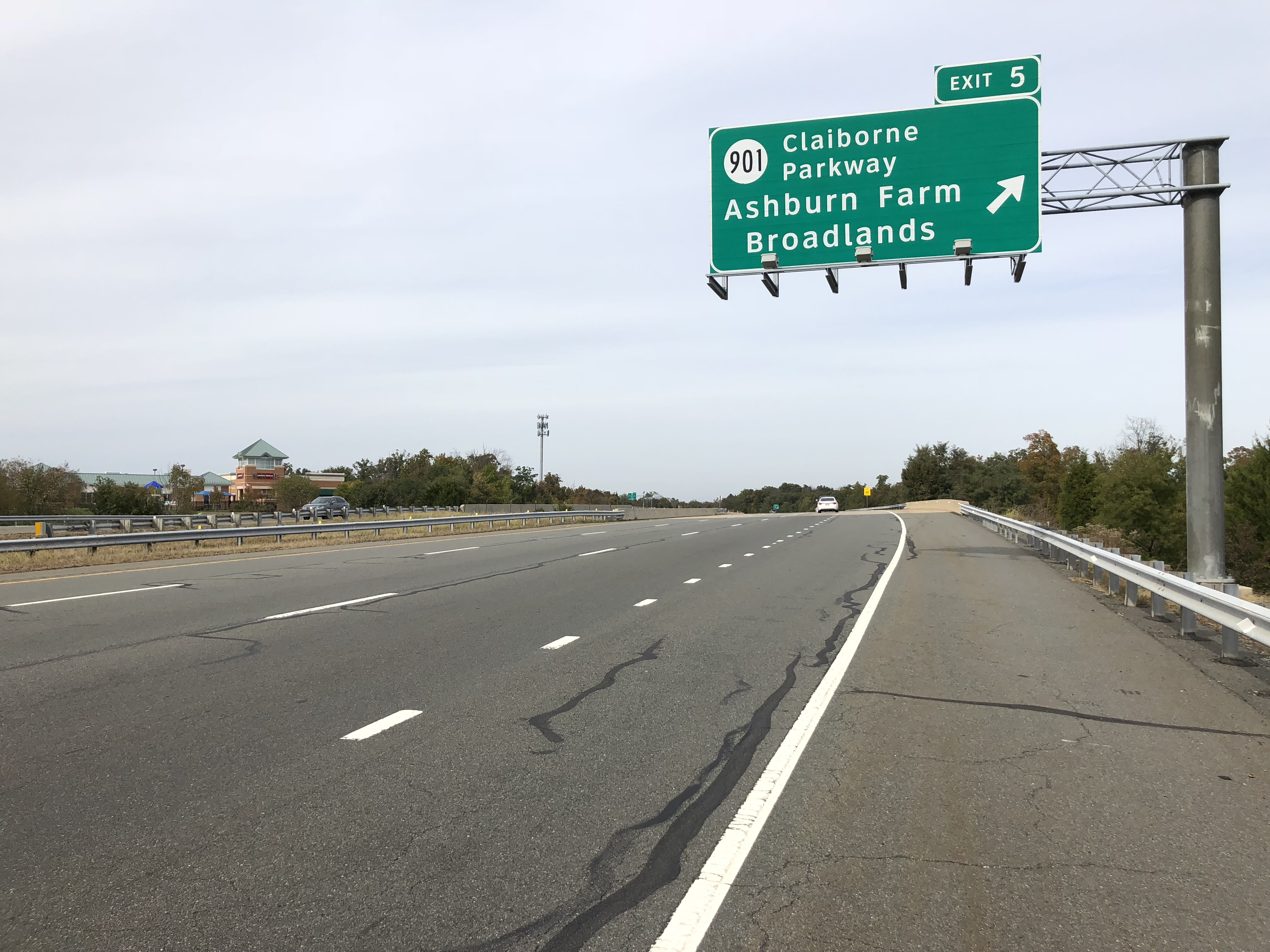
Dulles Greenway Exit 5 on to Claiborne Parkway toward Ashburn Farm

The name Ashburn is believed to have originated from "Ashburn Farm," a 1,236-acre estate originally owned by John Janney, a prominent 19th-century Quaker lawyer and politician who served as president of Virginia's Secession Convention in 1861. The property was later purchased by George Lee III in the 1870s, who is thought to have named it "Ashburn" either for the ash trees that dotted the landscape or possibly as a reference to the ash-colored soil or barn fires that had previously occurred in the area. Originally a quiet farming village known as Farmwell, the area became a part of a larger plantation economy in Loudoun County. Ashburn remained largely rural through the early 20th century. It began to change significantly in the 1980s and 1990s with the expansion of the Dulles Technology Corridor and the construction of large neighborhoods such as Ashburn Village and Ashburn Farm.

Today, Ashburn is a central part of Loudoun County's high-tech economy and suburban expansion with preserved natural and historic landscapes such as the W&OD Trail and nearby farms and battlefields.

According to the US Census Bureau, Ashburn is a census designated place. Despite being restricted to a certain boundary, the broader "Ashburn area" includes adjacent communities and commercial centers that share mailing addresses, infrastructure, and ZIP Codes like 20147 and 20148. This includes communities such as Brambleton, Broadlands, Moorefield, Loudoun Valley Estates, and Belmont. It originated as farmland and a small rail stop along the Washington and Old Dominion railroad, gradually developing into a suburban area as transportation routes and regional growth pushed west from Washington D.C.

== History ==
Ashburn, located in eastern Loudoun County, Virginia, was originally part of a rural agricultural region known as Farmwell. The land was divided among several estates during the 18th and 19th centuries, forming part of the broader plantation economy that defined much of northern Virginia. During the Civil War, Loudoun County was deeply divided, and while Ashburn did not see major battles, it was affected by nearby troop movements, raids, and the broader regional instability at the time.

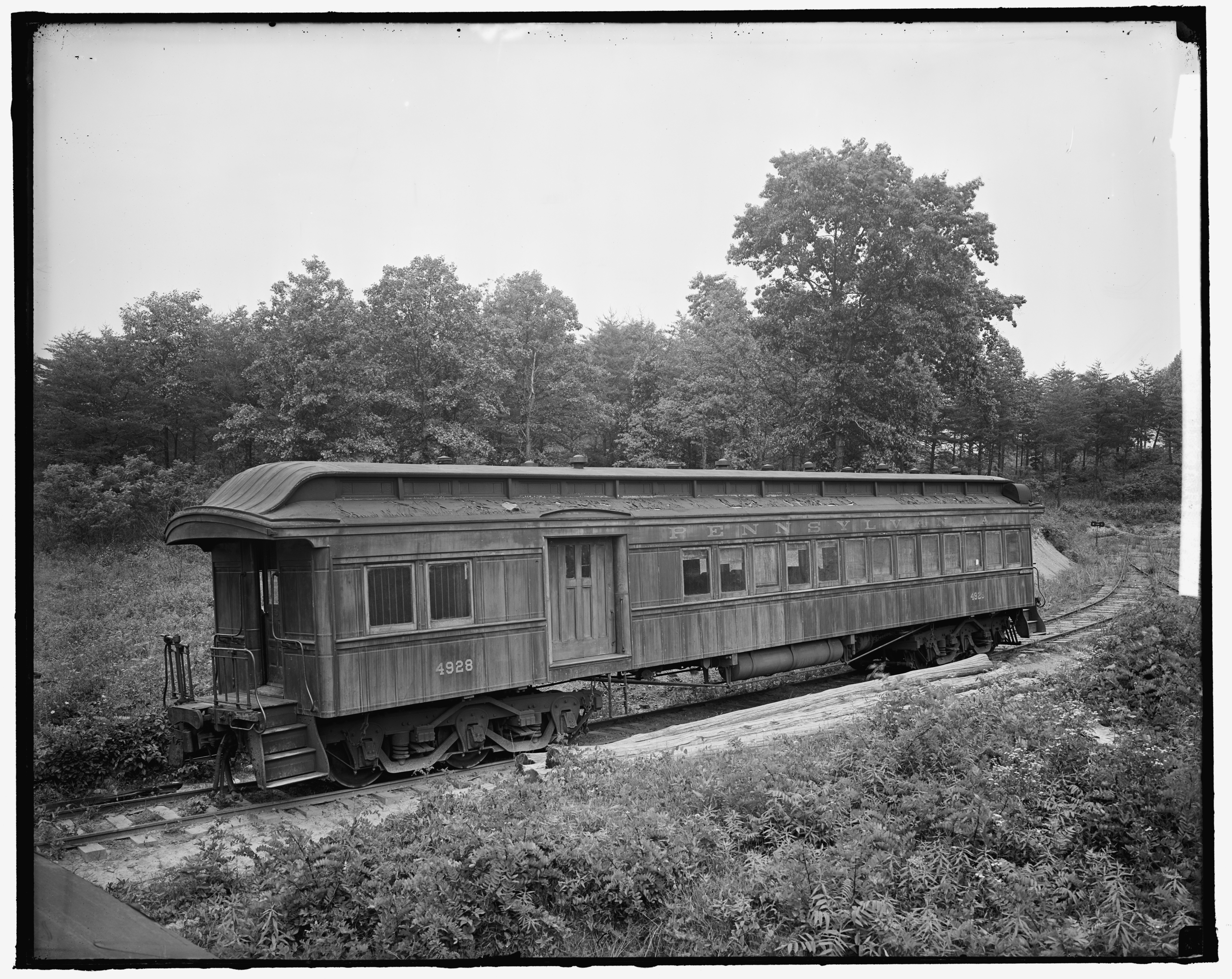
Exterior of a cart on the Washington and Old Dominion Railroad

In the late 19th century, the arrival of the Washington and Old Dominion Railroad provided a transportation link that supported local farms and small industries, although Ashburn itself remained sparsely populated and primarily agricultural well into the 20th century. The W&OD rail corridor, now a regional trail, is one of the area's key preserved historical routes. Following the American Civil War, land ownership changed and farming practices shifted, but Ashburn continued to be defined by its rural character for many decades.

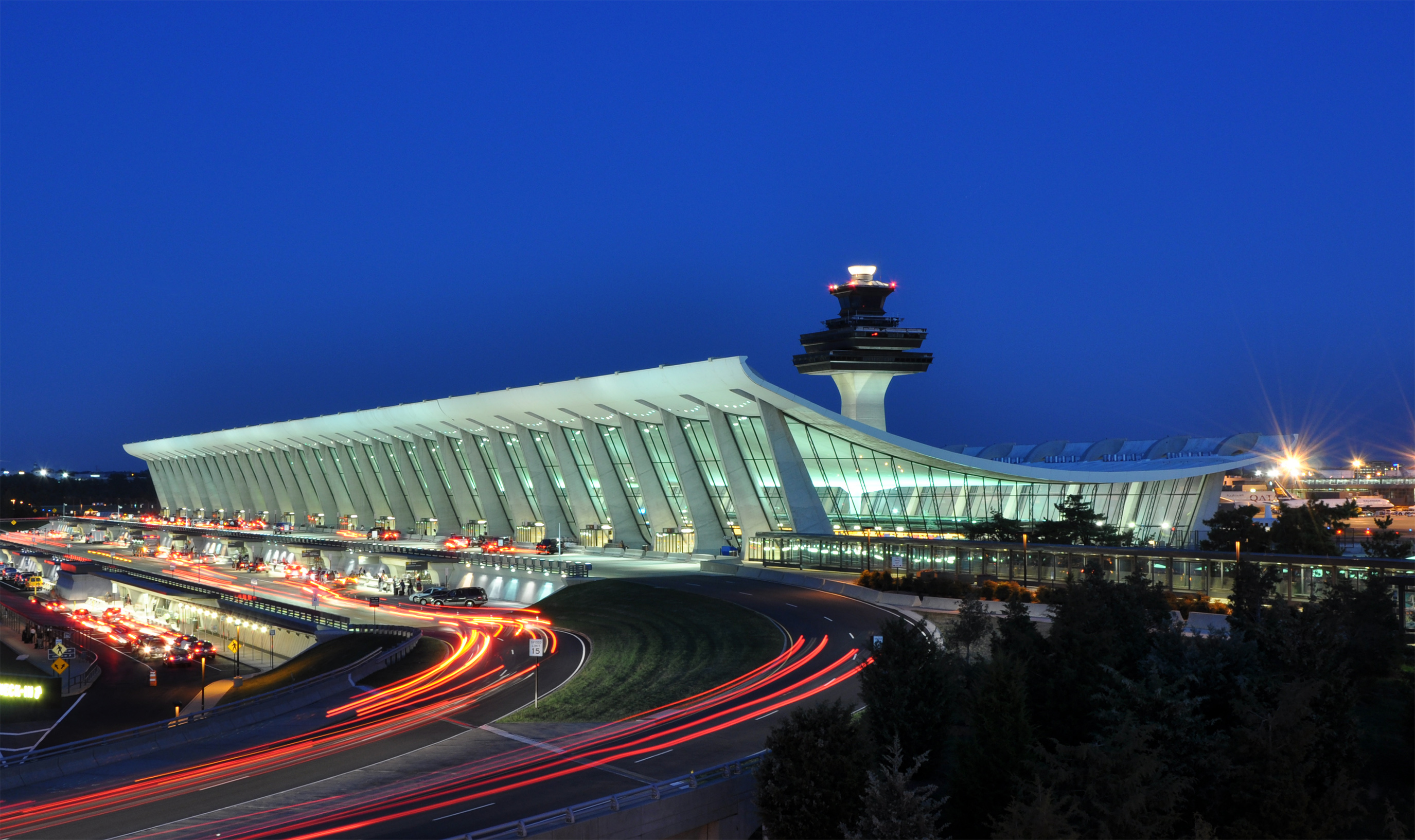
Main Terminal of Washington Dulles International Airport at dusk in Virginia, USA

Significant change began in the second half of the 20th century, particularly after the opening of Washington Dulles International Airport in 1962. This major infrastructure project spurred development throughout the surrounding region, and Ashburn's location made it a strategic site for future suburban and technological expansion. Major development in the 1980s and 1990s that came in the form of suburban neighborhoods and planned communities transformed the area into a major residential zone within Northern Virginia's growing suburban region. By the early 2000s, Ashburn had become a hub for global internet infrastructure. A combination of reliable electricity and access to fiber-optic networks attracted major technology firms. The region developed the highest concentration of data centers in the world, earning the nickname "Data Center Alley". Today, Ashburn is a central component of Loudoun County's tech economy, supporting various technological industries in areas such as cloud computing and cybersecurity while also serving as a key residential area for workers in the greater Washington, D.C. metro region.

== Geography ==
Ashburn is located in eastern Loudoun County, 7 miles (11 km) southeast of Leesburg, the county seat, and the same distance north of Dulles International Airport. As drawn by the U.S. Census Bureau, the area counted as "Ashburn" extends north to Virginia State Route 7, east to Virginia State Route 28, and southwest to the Dulles Greenway (VA 267). The Ashburn CDP is bordered to the north by the Belmont, Lansdowne, One Loudoun, and University Center CDPs; to the east by the Kincora, Dulles Town Center, and Sterling CDPs; to the southwest by the Moorefield and Broadlands CDPs; and to the west by the Goose Creek Village CDP.

According to the 2020 United States census, the Ashburn CDP has a total area of 15.55 square miles (40.27 km^{2}), of which 15.30 square miles (39.63 km^{2}) are land and 0.25 square miles (0.65 km^{2}) are water. The area is drained by Broad Run, which flows northward through the eastern part of the CDP toward the Potomac River.

=== Subdivisions ===
The Ashburn CDP consists of many major and minor subdivisions such as Ashbrook, Ashburn Farm, Ashburn Village, the Courts and Ridges at Ashburn, and the Village of Waxpool.

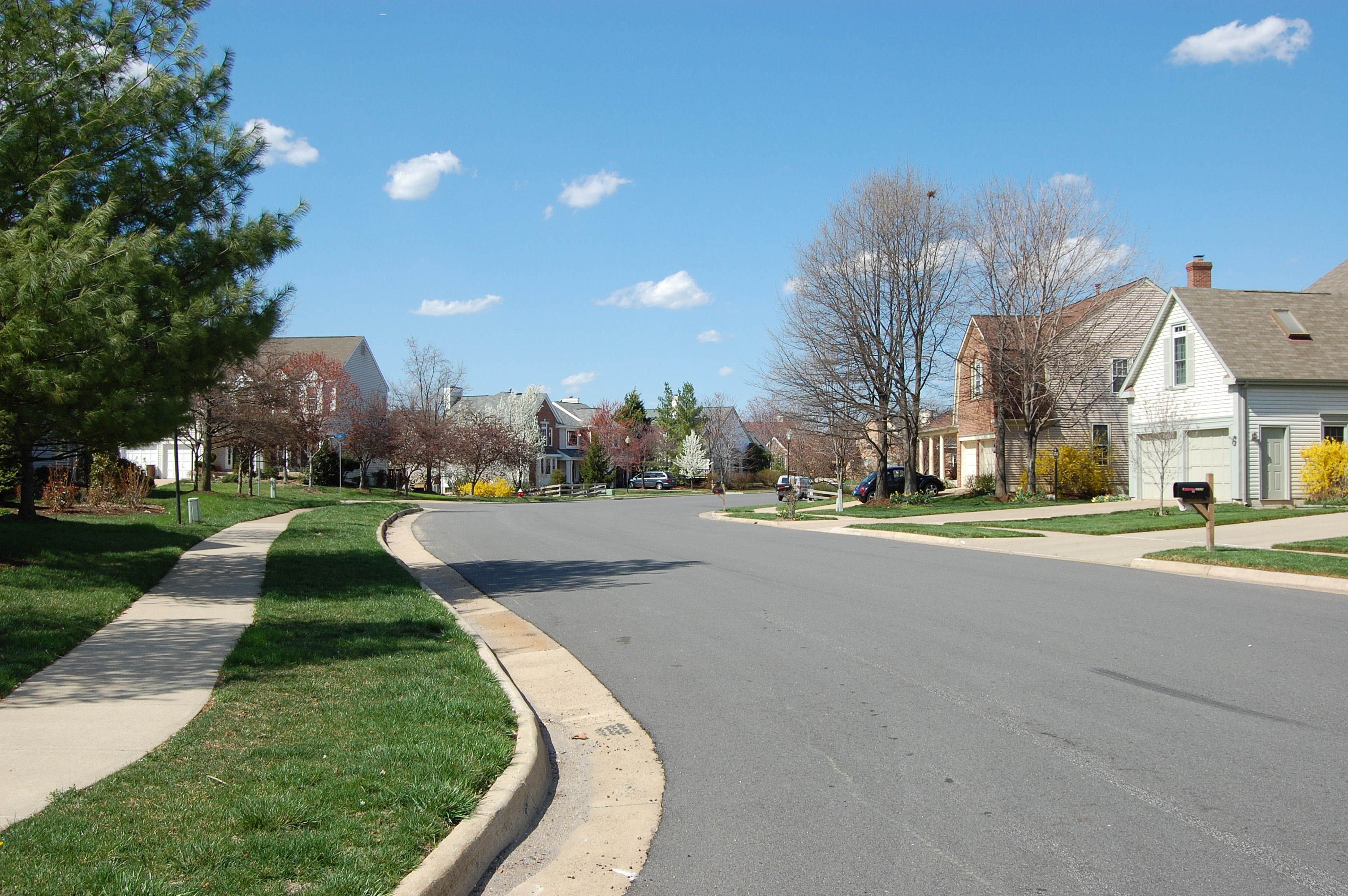
Typical street in Ashburn

== Demographics ==
Historical population
Census	Pop.	Note	%±
1990	3,393		—
2010	43,511		—
2020	46,349		6.5%
U.S. Decennial Census; 1950 1960 1970; 1980 1990 2000; 2010

=== 2020 census ===
As of the 2020 census, Ashburn had a population of 46,349. The median age was 39.7 years. 24.5% of residents were under the age of 18 and 15.1% of residents were 65 years of age or older. For every 100 females there were 93.2 males, and for every 100 females age 18 and over there were 88.8 males age 18 and over.

100.0% of residents lived in urban areas, while 0.0% lived in rural areas.

There were 17,210 households in Ashburn, of which 36.9% had children under the age of 18 living in them. Of all households, 58.5% were married-couple households, 12.7% were households with a male householder and no spouse or partner present, and 25.1% were households with a female householder and no spouse or partner present. About 24.7% of all households were made up of individuals and 12.1% had someone living alone who was 65 years of age or older.

There were 17,906 housing units, of which 3.9% were vacant. The homeowner vacancy rate was 0.4% and the rental vacancy rate was 8.2%.

Racial composition as of the 2020 census
Race	Number	Percent
White	26,996	58.2%
Black or African American	3,661	7.9%
American Indian and Alaska Native	157	0.3%
Asian	8,800	19.0%
Native Hawaiian and Other Pacific Islander	36	0.1%
Some other race	1,972	4.3%
Two or more races	4,727	10.2%
Hispanic or Latino (of any race)	5,264	11.4%

The Census Bureau's QuickFacts reported that 59.1% of residents were non-Hispanic White in 2020.

=== 2010 census ===
Ashburn was first listed as a census designated place in the 2010 U.S. census.

The United States Census Bureau defines Ashburn as a census-designated place (CDP). As of the 2010 census, the CDP had a population of 43,511 residents, while the larger ZIP Code Tabulation Area (ZCTA) for Ashburn's 20147 ZIP code contained 54,086 people.

=== Other demographics ===
Many of its residents commute into Washington, D.C. and the surrounding suburbs such as Tysons Corner and Reston to their places of employment. The median household income as of 2009 was $100,719. The median household size is 2.9 persons. 98% of Ashburn residents have a high school degree. Some 42 percent of Ashburn's population holds a four-year bachelor's degree; 18 percent holds graduate degrees.

Homeowners formed 80% of the population, renters made up 13% of the population, and 7% of housing units were listed as vacancies. The median age of housing was 5.0 years. The median housing value is at $630,000.

== Economy ==
Located within the Dulles Technology Corridor, Ashburn is home to many high-tech businesses. World Trade Center Dulles Airport is the second World Trade Center in the state. Verizon Business has a major office in Ashburn at the location replacing MCI WorldCom's headquarters after its acquisition. Ashburn is also home to government contractor Telos.

Ashburn is a major hub for data centers, with companies such as Digital Realty, Equinix, and NTT, operating multiple facilities there. Among other websites, the Wikimedia Foundation (parent of Wikipedia) and Amazon Web Services have data centers there.

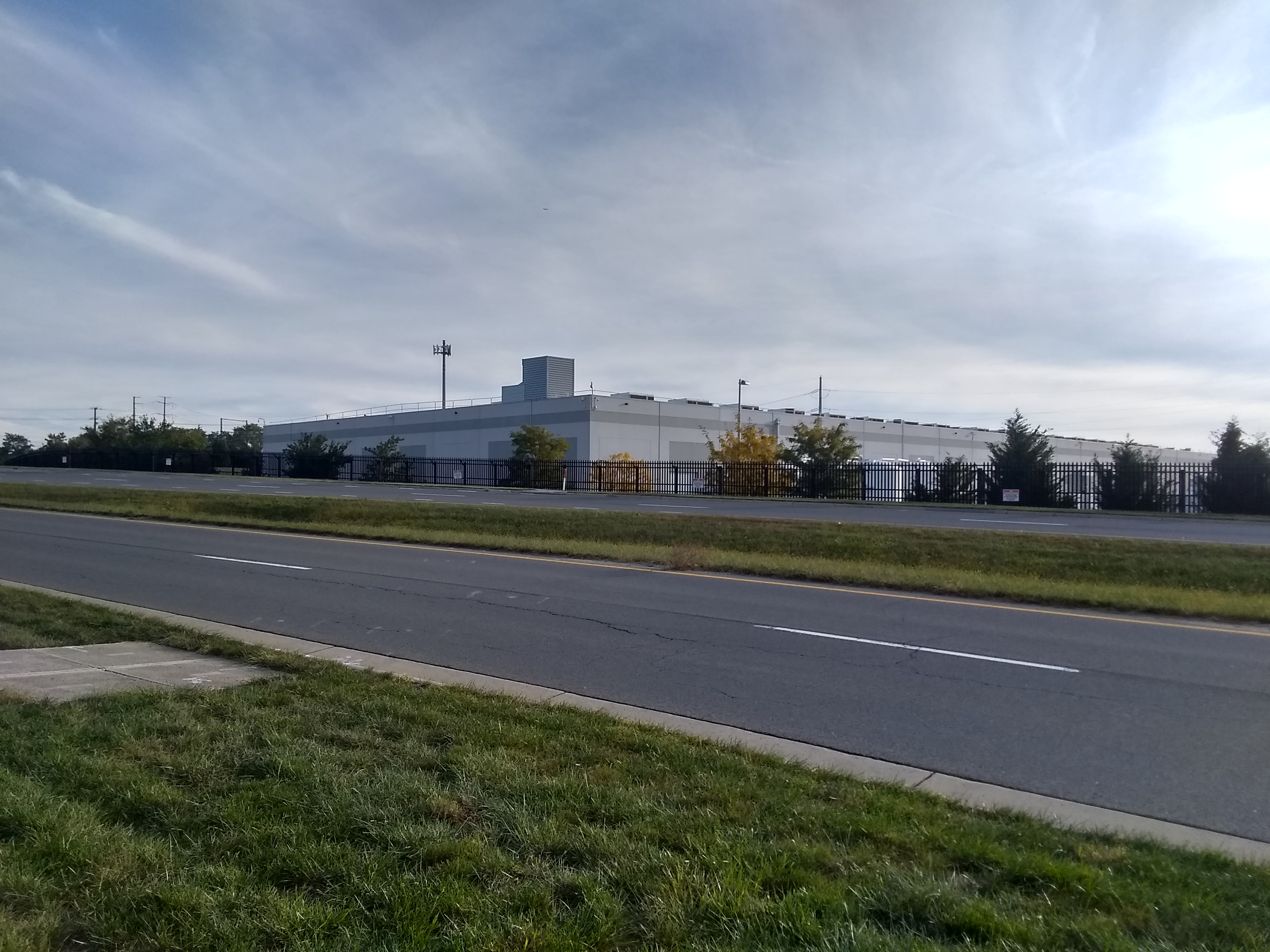
Amazon Web Services data center in Ashburn

The George Washington University's Virginia Science and Technology Campus and the Howard Hughes Medical Institute's Janelia Research Campus are located north of Ashburn in the University Center and Lansdowne CDPs, respectively. In 2026, the George Washington University sold their campus in Ashburn to Amazon Data Services for over $400 million, which Amazon plans to use for the construction of a new data center. The BigBear.ai Performance Center, the training facility for the Washington Commanders of the National Football League, is located in the east part of Ashburn.

Airbus Group, Inc., which is the North American affiliate of multinational aerospace corporation Airbus, and a large defense contractor, has a second location in Ashburn in addition to its main office in Herndon, Virginia.

== Education ==
=== Colleges and universities ===
George Washington University and Strayer University have campuses in the area. In December 2009, it was announced that George Mason University was planning to set up a campus in Ashburn, to be located at Exit 6 off the Dulles Greenway.

=== Primary and secondary schools ===
Educational institutions in Ashburn are operated by the Loudoun County Public Schools.

Ashburn's elementary schools include Ashburn Elementary School, Belmont Station Elementary School, Cedar Lane Elementary School, Creighton's Corner Elementary, Discovery Elementary School, Dominion Trail Elementary School, Hillside Elementary School, Legacy Elementary School, Madison's Trust Elementary, Mill Run Elementary School, Moorefield Station Elementary School, Newton-Lee Elementary School, Rosa Lee Carter Elementary School, Sanders Corner Elementary School, Steuart W. Weller Elementary School, and Sycolin Creek Elementary School.

Ashburn's public middle schools include Eagle Ridge Middle School, Farmwell Station Middle School, Stone Hill Middle School, Brambleton Middle School, Trailside Middle School, and Belmont Ridge Middle School.

Public high schools in Ashburn include Briar Woods High School, Broad Run High School, Independence High School, Rock Ridge High School, and Stone Bridge High School.

There are six private schools in Ashburn: Loudoun School for Advanced Studies, St. Theresa Catholic School, Virginia Academy, Leport School, The Loudoun Country Day School, and County Christian School.

== Media ==
Media covering Ashburn include Leesburg Today, Ashburn Magazine, and the Loudoun Times-Mirror.

== Infrastructure ==
=== Washington Metro ===
Ashburn is served by two Washington Metro Silver Line stations. After passing through Dulles Airport, the Silver Line enters Ashburn in the median of the Dulles Greenway. The first stop in Ashburn is Loudoun Gateway station, with Ashburn station serving as the terminus. Originally planned to open in 2016, the opening was pushed back by multiple delays and finally opened on November 15, 2022.

=== Emergency services ===
Ashburn's fire and emergency medical services are provided by the Loudoun County Combined Fire and Rescue System. Ashburn Volunteer Fire and Rescue Department (AVFRD) is a volunteer company under LC-CFRS, and serves Ashburn with Stations 6 and 22, which are located near Inova Loudoun Hospital. LC-CFRS career staff operate Moorefield Station 23, near Ashburn station (Washington Metro). The Ashburn area is served by the Inova Ashburn Healthplex Emergency Room at the corner of the Dulles Greenway and Loudoun County Parkway as well as Inova Loudoun Hospital, located less than 2 miles (3.2 km) from Ashburn in neighboring Lansdowne, and by larger hospitals in the Washington suburbs and city.

== Notable people ==
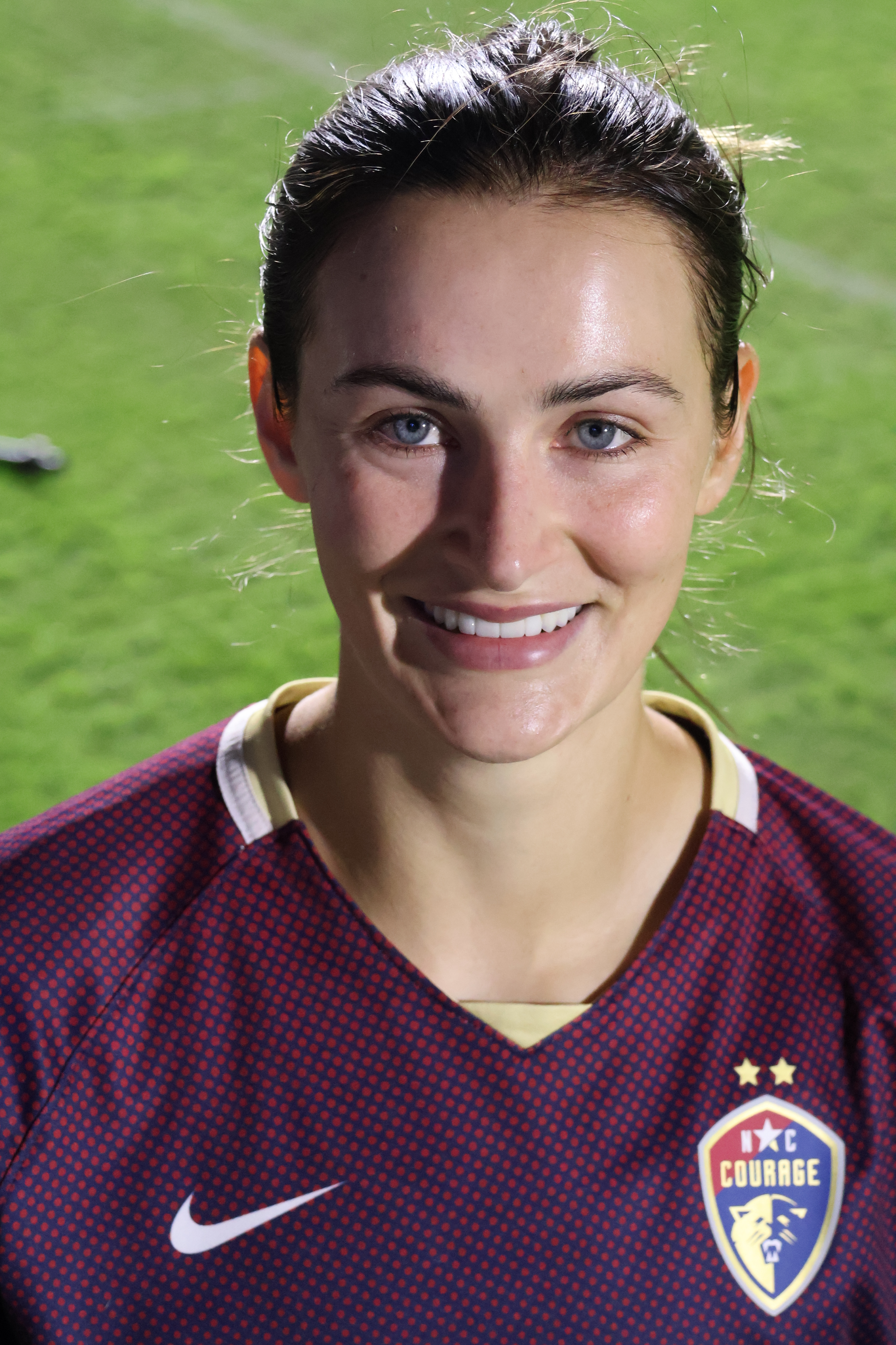
- Emily Fox
  Jonathan Allen, Minnesota Vikings defensive end
- J. B. Bukauskas, Major League Baseball player
- Ashley Caldwell, freestyle skier, member of the US team for the 2010 Winter Olympics
- Taylor Clarke, Major League Baseball player
- Nate Davis, Chicago Bears offensive lineman
- Emily Fox, soccer player and 2024 Olympic gold medalist for the United States
- Carl C. Johnson, retired U.S. Army Air Force/U.S. Army officer and last Tuskegee Airmen cadet pilot graduate
- Trace McSorley, Washington Commanders quarterback
- Wilson Pickett, singer
- David J. Rush, accused of stealing 300 kilograms of gold bars from the CIA
- Suhas Subramanyam, U.S. representative, former Virginia state senator and state delegate

== See also ==
- National Register of Historic Places listings in Loudoun County, Virginia
  - Ashburn Presbyterian Church
  - Belmont Manor House
  - Broad Run Bridge and Tollhouse
  - Janelia mansion, located on Janelia Farm Research Campus
- Ashburn Colored School
- Edelman Financial Field
