= Ketoctin Baptist Church =

Historic church in Virginia, US

- Ketocton Baptist Church
- U.S. National Register of Historic Places
- Virginia Landmarks Register
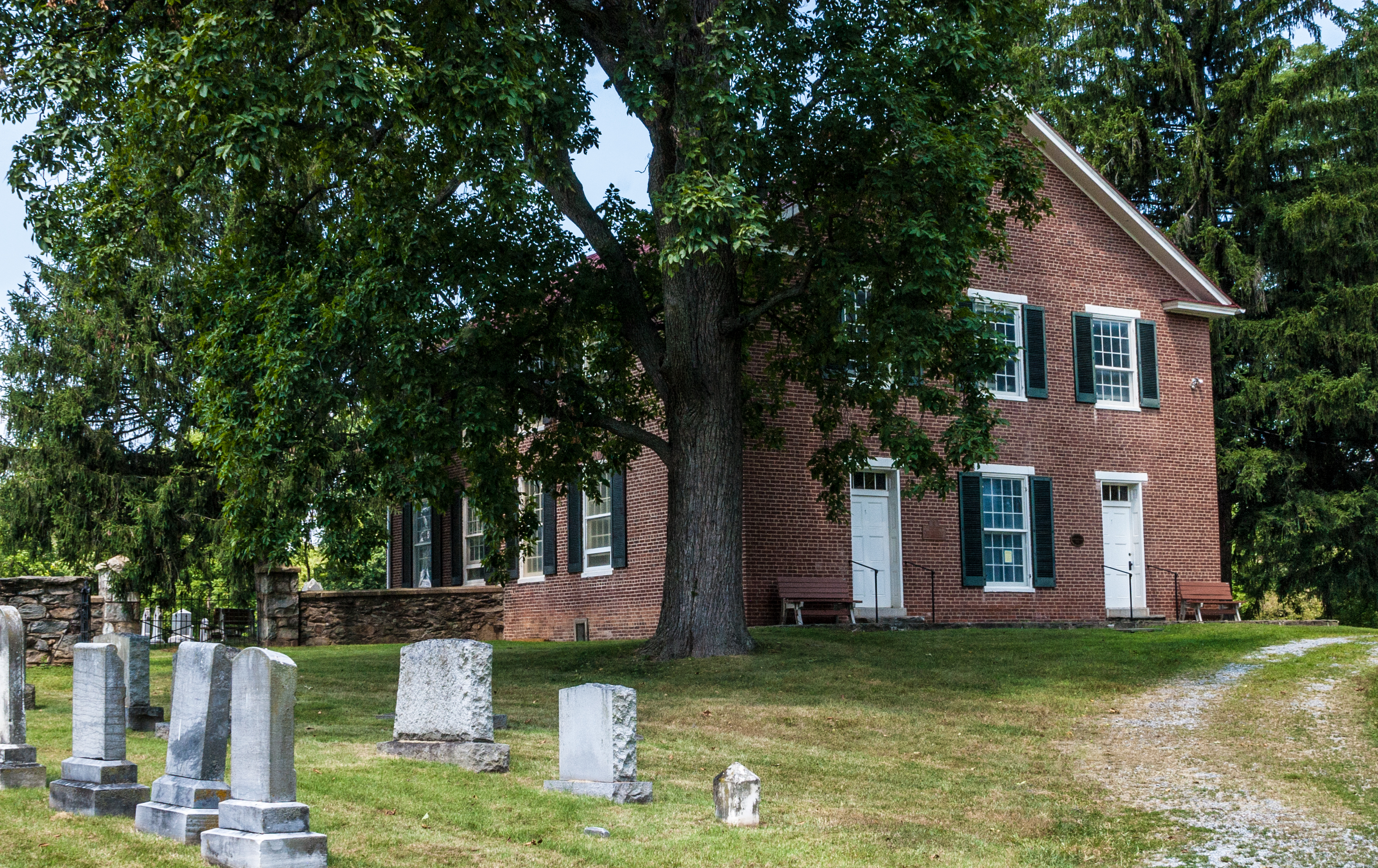
- Ketoctin Baptist Church, 2013

- Location within Northern Virginia Location within Virginia Location within the United States
- Location: Approx. 2 mi. N of VA 7 at the jct of Allder School Rd. and Ketoctin Church Rd., Round Hill, Virginia
- Coordinates: 39°09′26″N 77°45′00″W
- Area: 18.8 acres (7.6 ha)
- Built: 1854
- Architectural style: Greek Revival
- NRHP reference No.: 03000452
- VLR No.: 053-0308

Significant dates
- Added to NRHP: May 22, 2003
- Designated VLR: March 19, 2003

Ketoctin Baptist Church, also known as Short Hill Church, is a historic Baptist church located at Round Hill, Loudoun County, Virginia. It is listed on both the U.S. National Register of Historic Places and the Virginia Landmarks Register.

== History ==
In 1752, the Philadelphia Baptist Association dispatched four missionaries to "Ketocton" (then in Fairfax County) and Mill Creek (then in Frederick County, from which Berkeley County split off in 1772 and became part of West Virginia in 1863) to bring them into fellowship with other Regular Baptist congregations. On August 19, 1766, four Regular Baptist churches (Ketocton, Smith Creek Baptist, Mill Creek Baptist and Broad Run Baptist) disassociated from the Philadelphia Association and formed the Ketocton Association, which today includes nine historic churches. In 1775, the association voted to support disestablishment of the Anglican church in Virginia. After the American Revolutionary War, at its 1797 annual meeting, the association recommended the gradual emancipation of slaves, which proved controversial within the denomination. The association's minutes (and a history) through 1808 are available through several open sources. Local Lore suggests that the first structure was burned down by nearby Native Tribe members. However, these local stories are passed down by word of mouth from "Father to Son" and although Authenticated, were never recorded. Ketoctin Cemetery is the final resting place of several Revolutionary War soldiers. (Legends of the Loudoun Valley by Joseph V. Nichols and Potomac Press Originally Copyrighted 1955, updated 1961)

Ketoctin, which lent its name to the group and which may derive from the same Native American word as the nearby Catoctin Mountains to the north, is part of one group along Route 7 en route to Winchester, Virginia. Another group clusters along what is now U.S. 211, in the Shenandoah Valley including New Market, Virginia. Ketoctin pastors David Major (1722-1796) and John Gerrard (1720-1787) founded or help found several congregations in Fairfax, Frederick and Loudoun counties.

The association grew to 39 churches in 11 counties by 1820, when several churches split off to form the Columbia Baptist Association (for churches in or around the nation's capital). In the 1890s the Ketocton Association renamed itself the Primitive Baptist Association, without any significant change in doctrine.

== Building ==
The current single-story, rectangular brick building with a gable roof in the Greek Revival style was built in 1854. It measures approximately 40 feet by 55 feet, and sits on a stone foundation. The interior features a trompe-l'œil painting attributed to Lucien Whiting Powell, a local artist (1846-1930).

Also located on the property is the contributing church cemetery with the earliest grave recorded in 1777. It is enclosed by a fieldstone wall.

It was listed on the National Register of Historic Places in 2003.

== See also ==
Stephen L. Longenecker, Shenandoah Religion: Outsiders and the Mainstream, 1716-1865 (Baylor University Press, 2002) ISBN 0-918954-83-5 Irene Jeffries, Margaret Bennett, Ketocton Baptist Church, Loudoun Co., Va (1974)
