= Georges Island =

Georges Island, or George's Island, may refer to:

== Geography ==
- Georges Island (Massachusetts), offshore from the city of Boston, Massachusetts
- Georges Island (Nova Scotia), offshore from the community of Halifax in the Halifax Regional Municipality, Nova Scotia
- Tahiti, given the name 'George's Island' (or 'King George's Island') on first encounters with the British in the 1760s

== Other ==
- George's Island (film)
- Georges Island Lighthouse

== See also ==
- Georges (disambiguation)
