= Howardsville, Virginia =

Howardsville is the name of several unincorporated communities in the U.S. state of Virginia.

- Howardsville, Albemarle County, Virginia
- Howardsville, Loudoun County, Virginia
