= Round Hill Historic District (Round Hill, Virginia) =

Historic district in Virginia, United States

- U.S. National Register of Historic Places
- U.S. Historic district
- Virginia Landmarks Register
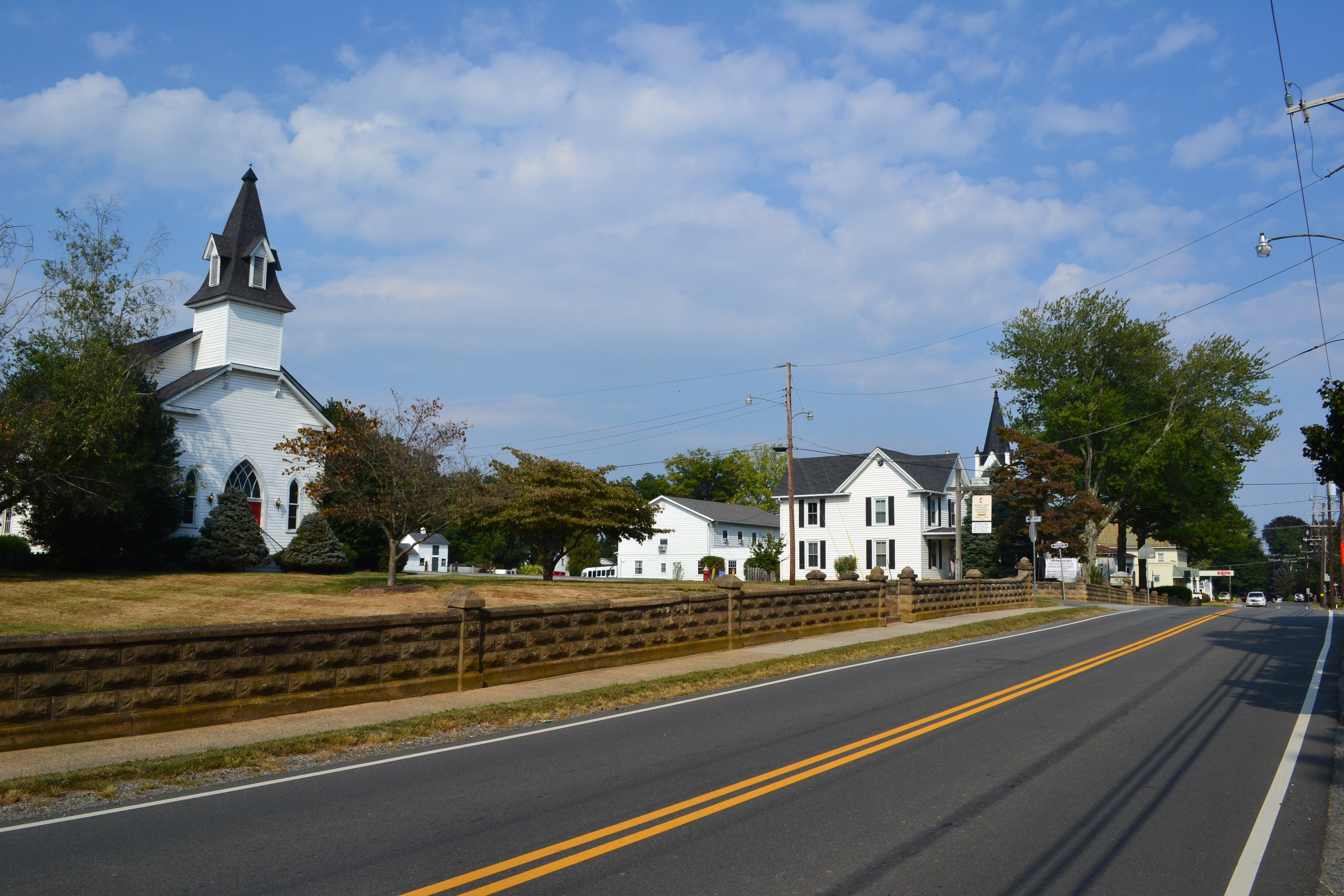

- Location within Northern Virginia Location within Virginia Location within the United States
- Location: Area within the Round Hill town limits that is bounded roughly bu VA 7 to the S., Locust St. to the W., Bridge on E, Round Hill, Virginia
- Coordinates: 39°7′58″N 77°46′07″W
- Area: 96 acres (39 ha)
- Built: c. 1850
- Built by: Simpson, Arch
- Architects: Noland, Barney
- Architectural style: Late Victorian, Late 19th And 20th Century Revivals, Folk
- NRHP reference No.: 09000366
- VLR No.: 291-0010

Significant dates
- Added to NRHP: May 28, 2009
- Designated VLR: December 18, 2008

Round Hill Historic District is a national historic district located at Round Hill, Loudoun County, Virginia. It encompasses 204 contributing buildings, 1 contributing site, and 1 contributing structure in the town of Round Hill. It includes a variety of residential, commercial, and institutional buildings, with the majority built between 1880 and 1920. Notable buildings include the Gregg-Parks-Potts House (c. 1775), Guilford Gregg Store (c. 1851), Sagamore Hall, James Copeland House (1886), Hibbs House (c. 1890), African Methodist Church (1892), Mount Zion Baptist Church, Round Hill Baptist Church, Round Hill United Methodist Church, Castle Hall, Ford's Store, Round Hill Grocery, and the former Round Hill Railroad Depot (1902).

It was listed on the National Register of Historic Places in 2009.

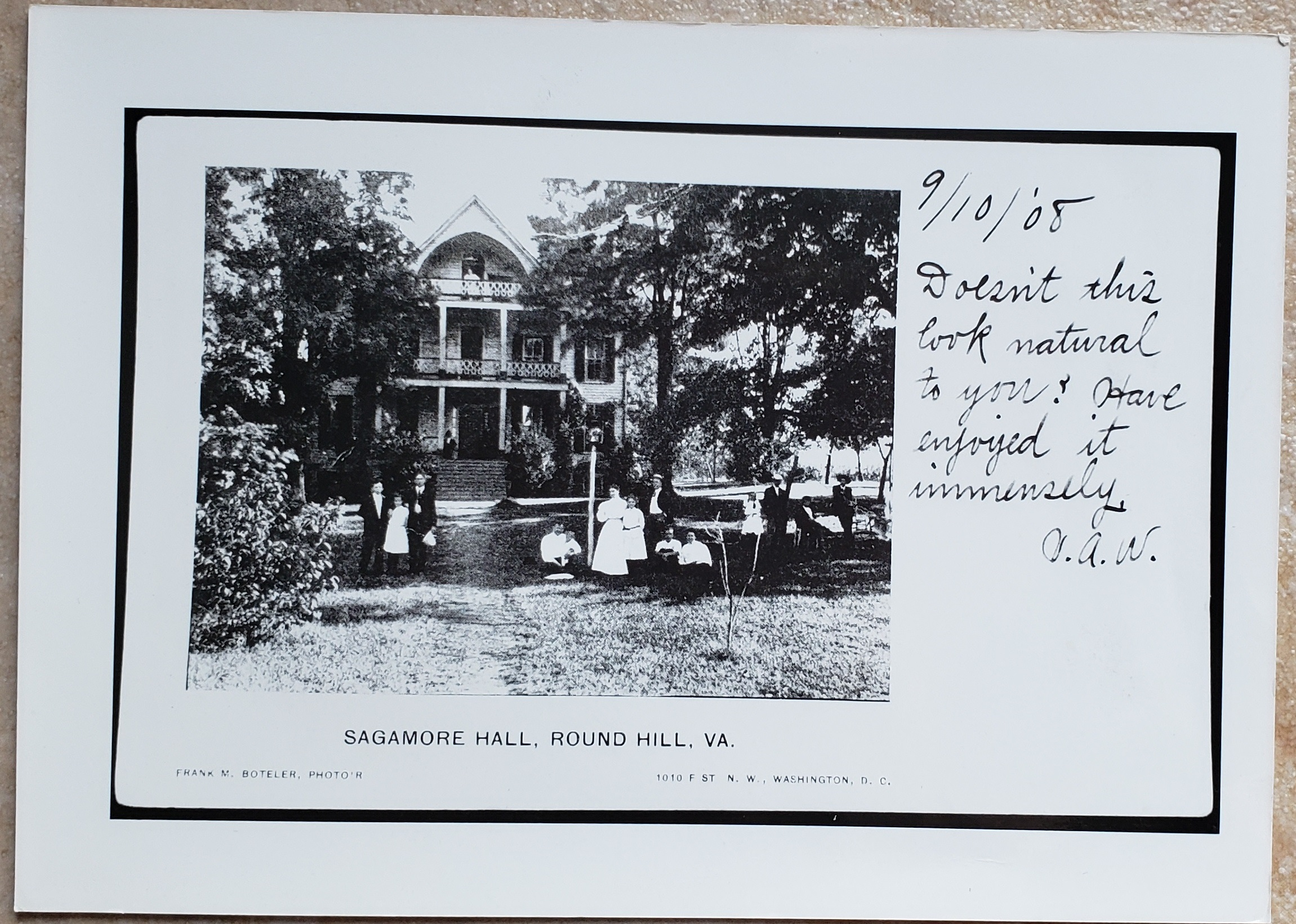
Sagamore Hall 09/10/1808
