= Little Washington =

Little Washington may refer to:

- Washington, North Carolina, the county seat of Beaufort County
- Washington, Pennsylvania, county seat of Washington County
- Washington, Virginia, the county seat of Rappahannock County
  - The Inn at Little Washington, an award-winning restaurant and inn in Washington, Virginia
- Little Washington, Virginia, a now mostly uninhabited African American village in Loudoun County, Virginia
- An episode of Death Valley Days From Season 2
