= Airmont =

Airmont may refer to:

- Airmont, New York, a village in Rockland County, New York, US
- Airmont, Virginia, an unincorporated village in Loudoun County, Virginia, US
- Airmont (microarchitecture), used in Intel Atom processors
