= Howardsville =

Howardsville may refer to:

- Howardsville, Colorado
- Howardsville, New Jersey
- Howardsville, Albemarle County, Virginia
- Howardsville, Loudoun County, Virginia
