= Woodburn, Virginia =

Woodburn, Virginia may refer to:

- Woodburn, Fairfax County, Virginia
- Woodburn, Loudoun County, Virginia
