= Little Washington, Virginia =

Unincorporated community in Virginia, United States

- Village, unincorporated community
- Banshee Reeks Nature Preserve, near Little Washington

- Location within Northern Virginia Location within Virginia Location within the United States
- Coordinates: 39°2′25″N 77°35′42″W
- Country: United States
- State: Virginia
- County: Loudoun
- Time zone: UTC−5 (Eastern (EST))
  - Summer (DST): UTC−4 (EDT)
- ZIP codes: 20175 (Leesburg)
- GNIS feature ID: 1749628

Little Washington is a now mostly uninhabited African American village in Loudoun County, Virginia, United States.

== Geography ==
It is located south of Gleedsville off The Woods Road. Little Washington lies on a hill overlooking Gleedsville Cemetery where the community once consisted of several homes belonging to the Washington family.

== Education ==
Little Washington was served by the Mountain Gap Colored School, which remained standing until the 1980s, when it burned down.
