= Georges =

Georges may refer to:

== Places ==
- Georges River, New South Wales, Australia
- Georges Quay (Dublin)
- Georges Township, Fayette County, Pennsylvania

== Other uses ==
- Georges (name)
- Georges (novel), a novel by Alexandre Dumas
- "Georges" (song), a 1977 song originally recorded by Pat Simon and covered by Sylvie Vartan
- Georges (store), a department store in Melbourne, Australia from 1880 to 1995
- Georges (Green Card character)

== People with the surname ==
- Eugenia Georges, American anthropologist
- Karl Ernst Georges (1806–1895), German classical philologist and lexicographer, known for his edition of Latin-German dictionaries.
- Mary Ngwanda Georges, Congo-born American politician

== Arts and entertainment ==
- "Georges", an episode of Bel Ami

== See also ==
- École secondaire Georges-P.-Vanier, a high school in Hamilton, Ontario, Canada
- École secondaire Georges-Vanier in Laval, Quebec, Canada
- French cruiser Georges Leygues, commissioned in 1937
- French frigate Georges Leygues (D640), commissioned in 1979
- George (disambiguation)
- Georges Creek (disambiguation)
- Georges Hall, New South Wales
- Georges Head Battery, New South Wales
- Georges Heights, New South Wales
- Georges Island (disambiguation)
- Georges Labit Museum, Toulouse, France
- Georges Levy G.L.40, French amphibious biplane designed in 1917
- Georges Leygues-class frigates of the French Navy
- Georges Mill, Virginia
- Georges P. Vanier Secondary School in Courtenay, British Columbia, Canada
- Georges River College Hurstville Boys Campus, Sydney
- Georges River National Park, Sydney
- Georges Valentine (shipwreck), wrecked 1904 off the coast of Martin County, Florida
- Georges Vanier Catholic School, Ottawa, Ontario
- Georges Vanier Elementary School in Surrey, British Columbia, Canada
- Georges Vanier Secondary School in Toronto, Ontario, Canada
- Georges-Vanier (Montreal Metro), Montreal, Canada
- Georgescu, a surname
- Georgeson, a surname
- Georgestown, St. John's, neighbourhood near the downtown of St. John's, Newfoundland and Labrador
- Georgesville, Ohio
- List of hurricanes named Georges
