= Georges Mill, Virginia =

Unincorporated community in Virginia, United States

- Unincorporated village
- Location within Northern Virginia Location within Virginia Location within the United States
- Coordinates: 39°17′16″N 77°39′46″W
- Country: United States
- State: Virginia
- County: Loudoun
- Time zone: UTC−5 (Eastern (EST))
  - Summer (DST): UTC−4 (EDT)

Georges Mill is an unincorporated village in northern Loudoun County, Virginia, United States. The community takes its name from the mill that once operated there on Dutchman Creek to the north of Elvan. Georges Mill is located at the crossroads of Irish Corner Road (VA 673) and Georges Mill Road (VA 852).

Goats at the petting zoo at the Georges Mill Farm was the suspected vector of an E. coli outbreak. "Out of an abundance of caution," the farm stopped allowing people from petting baby goats.
