= University Center, Virginia =

- Census-designated place
- Location within Northern Virginia Location within Virginia Location within the United States
- Coordinates: 39°3′22″N 77°26′25″W
- Country: United States
- State: Virginia
- County: Loudoun
- Named for: George Washington University Virginia Science and Technology Campus

Area
  - Total: 0.95 sq mi (2.46 km^{2})
  - Land: 0.92 sq mi (2.38 km^{2})
  - Water: 0.031 sq mi (0.08 km^{2})
- Elevation: 265 ft (81 m)

Population (2010)
  - Total: 3,586
  - Density: 3,905/sq mi (1,507.8/km^{2})
- Time zone: UTC−5 (Eastern (EST))
  - Summer (DST): UTC−4 (EDT)
- ZIP code: 20147 (Ashburn)
- FIPS code: 51-80120
- GNIS feature ID: 2584932

University Center is a census-designated place (CDP) in Loudoun County, Virginia, United States. As of the 2020 census, University Center had a population of 3,969. Mailing addresses in the community are for Ashburn.

== Geography ==
The University Center CDP is in eastern Loudoun County, on the north side of Virginia State Route 7 (Harry Byrd Highway). Via Route 7, it is 7 miles (11 km) northwest to Leesburg, the county seat, and 30 miles (48 km) southeast to Washington, D.C. The community is bordered to the north by the Potomac River and to the east by Broad Run, its tributary. Ashburn is to the south, across Route 7, and Montgomery County, Maryland, borders the CDP across the Potomac.

According to the U.S. Census Bureau, the CDP has a total area of 0.97 square miles (2.5 km^{2}), of which 0.03 square miles (0.08 km^{2}), or 3.29%, are water.

== Demographics ==
Historical population
Census	Pop.	Note	%±
2010	3,586		—
2020	3,969		10.7%
U.S. Decennial Census; 2010 2020

University Center was first listed as a census designated place in the 2010 U.S. census.
