= John Champe (soldier) =

Continental Army soldier and spy

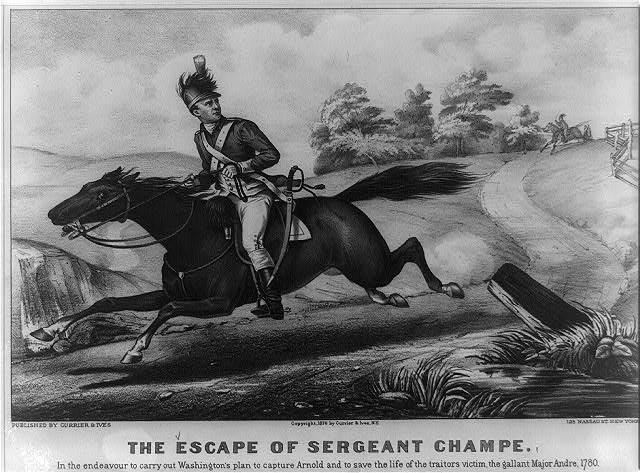
- "The Escape of Sergeant Champe": Lithograph: New York: Currier & Ives, c. 1876.
- Born: 1752; Aldie, Virginia, British America
- Died: September 30, 1798 (aged 45–46); Prickett's Fort, Virginia, U.S.
- Spouse: Phebe Susan Barnard
- Children: William Champ, Mary Champ, Susann Champ, Eleanor Champ, Amelia Champ, John Champ, Nathaniel Champ
- Espionage activity
- Allegiance: United States of America

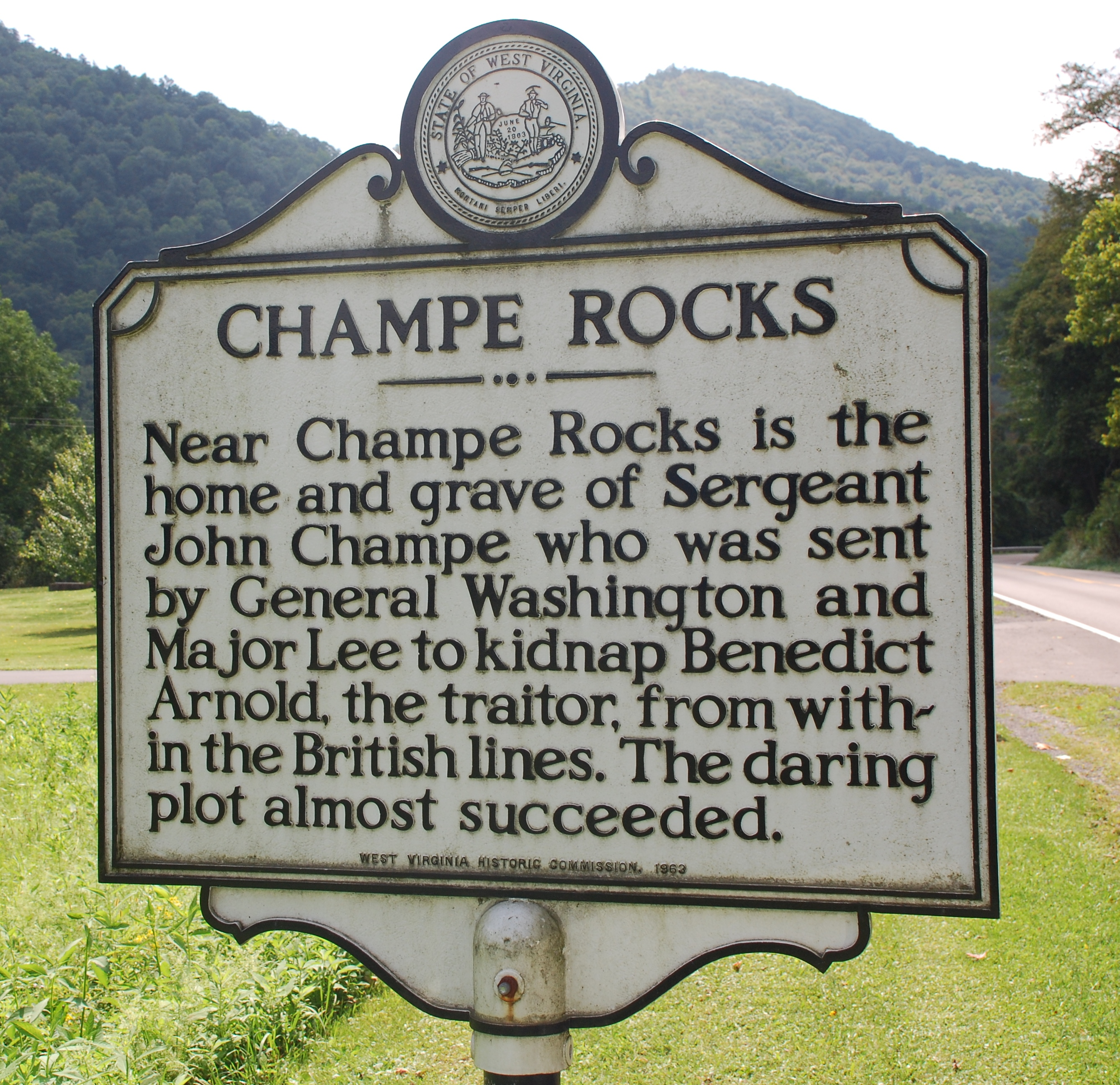
Historical marker near Champe's last residence in what is now Pendleton County, West Virginia. (The reference to his grave is an error.)

Sergeant Major John Champe (ca. 1752 – 30 September 1798) was an American Revolutionary War senior enlisted soldier in the Continental Army who became a double agent in a failed attempt to capture the American traitor General Benedict Arnold (1741–1801).

== Biography ==
Champe was born about 1752 near what is now Aldie in Loudoun County, Virginia.

Champe enlisted in the Virginia Cavalry from Loudoun County in 1776 and was made sergeant major in Lee's Legion, a unit later commanded by (then Major) Henry Lee III, who later became more well-known as Colonel "Light-Horse Harry" Lee and as the father of Gen. Robert E. Lee. Champe's family was said to be well known to Major Lee.

A plan was formulated to kidnap the defecting General Benedict Arnold and bring him back to American lines to face court martial. A key motivation for the operation was to obtain information as to the possibility of other high-ranking American officers being involved in the treasonous Arnold's activities.

Handpicked by George Washington and Lee for the spy mission, Champe "defected" to the British side in 1780, where he was introduced to Arnold and soon gathered intelligence that established that there were no other American generals involved with Arnold. Champe formulated a plot to capture Arnold on his regular evening stroll, but the plan was foiled when Champe's unit in the British army was ordered to embark from New York and join the Virginia campaign of 1780–1781. Champe was never able to resume the effort in any form thereafter.

Despite being forced to serve with the British for many months after the failed plot, Champe eventually managed to escape back to the Continental Army. Upon rejoining, Champe voiced a desire to continue his service fighting the British, but Lee dissuaded him from it — pointing out that if captured, he could now be hanged as a spy. Nevertheless, Lee believed that Champe had acquitted himself well and had him discharged honorably from the Continental Army.

According to Legends of Loudoun: An Account of the History and Homes of a Border County of Virginia's Northern Neck (1938) by Harrison Williams:

...after the war, it is said on the personal recommendation of General Washington, Sergeant Champe was appointed to the position of doorkeeper or sergeant-at-arms of the Continental Congress, then meeting at Philadelphia, but obliged, on account of rioting, to remove to Trenton. His name appears on the rolls of August 25, 1783 as holding that position. Soon afterwards, he returned to Loudoun County, married and acquired a small holding near what is now Dover, between the later towns of Aldie and Middleburg, close to the present Little River Turnpike.

Champe may also have spent time in Kentucky. He and his wife had seven children. Champe then moved to Augusta (now Pendleton) County, then in Virginia, today in West Virginia. A local tradition, maintained by Champe's descendants, is that he had been promised a grant of lands in the area, but never received it. He died in poverty, unable to care for two of his sons, John and Thomas, who as teenagers were apprenticed to a tannery at Mouth of Seneca.

Champe died on September 30, 1798, while staying at Prickett's Fort — near what is now Fairmont, West Virginia — on a trip to (according to different accounts) consider a land purchase or visit one of his children. He was buried near the fort, but the exact location of his grave remains unknown.

== Legacy ==
=== Family ===
Champe's wife was Phebe Susan Barnard who, beginning in 1831 and then living in Ohio, received a pension of $120 annually based upon her husband's war service.

=== Family Tree ===
Family Tree

		John Champe		Phebe Susan; Barnard
William Champe; June 6, 1795, – May 9, 1875, Peoria, IL	Mary Champe; ~ 1798 – abt. 1837, Warren Co., IN	Susann Champe	Eleanor Champe		Amelia Champe (d. 1835)	John Champe	Nathaniel Champe d. Feb. 13,1870, Ingham Co., MI

=== Namesakes ===
- In the American Civil War, the Confederate rifle company from Aldie, Virginia, "Champe's Rifles", named themselves in honor of Champe.
- John Champe High School in Aldie, Virginia
- Champe's Ford Road, a mile or two west of Aldie, Virginia, is named for John Champe's family.
- On February 12, 2022, the Sergeant Major John Champe Chapter was chartered with the Virginia Society, Sons of the American Revolution.

=== Monuments ===
- Historical markers to Sergeant Champe have been erected in at least three places:
  - Near Aldie in Loudoun County, Virginia, where he was born.
    - In 1934, a marker was placed by U.S. Highway 15 (now U.S. 50) at a lay-by close to the few stones that remained from Champe's home.
    - About 100 yards off US 50, an obelisk built in 1939 from the stones also stands nearby. It bears the inscription:

"Here was the house of Sergeant John Champe, Continental Army,
who risked the inglorious death of a spy for the independence of his country."

  - At Champe Rocks, Pendleton County, West Virginia, where he settled after the War. (A reference to his gravesite here is an error.)
  - At Onondaga Township, Michigan, Ingham County, Michigan, At Lane Cemetery his descendants installed a cenotaph grave monument. The Lansing Chapter of the Daughters of the American Revolution marked the monument in 1921.
  - At Prickett's Fort, Marion County, West Virginia, near where he died and was buried. The marker here is not at his grave, but was placed on 22 April 2001, in a ceremony with full military honors.

== Media ==
Champe is a character in season four of the AMC television show Turn: Washington's Spies.

== See also ==
- Intelligence in the American Revolutionary War
- Intelligence operations in the American Revolutionary War
- Jane Tuers
- Three Pigeons
