= 2019 Virginia local elections =

- November 5, 2019

The 2019 Virginia municipal elections were held on November 5, 2019 to elect members of the County Board of Supervisors, Soil and Water Directors, and City School Board members.

== County Board of Supervisors ==
All 95 counties in Virginia in Virginia had at least one Board of Supervisor member up for election or reelection in 2019.

County	Total seats	Democratic			Republican			Independent		
County	Total seats	Seats before	Seats after	Change	Seats before	Seats after	Change	Seats before	Seats after	Change
Accomack	9	3		Steady	5		Steady	1		Steady
Albemarle	6	3	6	+3	3	0	-3	0	0	Steady
Alleghany	7	0		Steady	6		Steady	1		Steady
Amelia	5	0		Steady	5		Steady	0		Steady
Amherst	5	1		Steady	4		Steady	0		Steady
Appomattox	5	2		Steady	3		Steady	0		Steady
Arlington	5	5	5	Steady	0	0	Steady	0	0	Steady
Augusta	7	1		Steady	6		Steady	0		Steady
Bath	5	0		Steady	5		Steady	0		Steady
Bedford	7	1		Steady	6		Steady	0		Steady
Bland	5	0		Steady	5		Steady	0		Steady
Botetourt	5	0		Steady	5		Steady	0		Steady
Brunswick	5	4		Steady	1		Steady	0		Steady
Buchanan	7	0		Steady	7		Steady	0		Steady
Buckingham	7	1		Steady	5		Steady	1		Steady
Campbell	7	2		Steady	5		Steady	0		Steady
Caroline	6	2		Steady	4		Steady	0		Steady
Carroll	6	1		Steady	5		Steady	0		Steady
Charles City	3	2		Steady	1		Steady	0		Steady
Charlotte	7	2		Steady	5		Steady	0		Steady
Chesterfield	5	1		Steady	4		Steady	0		Steady
Clarke	5	0		Steady	5		Steady	0		Steady
Craig	5	1		Steady	4		Steady			Steady
Culpeper	7			Steady			Steady			Steady
Cumberland	5			Steady			Steady			Steady
Dickenson	5			Steady			Steady			Steady
Dinwiddie	5			Steady			Steady			Steady
Essex	5			Steady			Steady			Steady
Fairfax	10	8	9	+1	2	1	-1	0	0	Steady
Fauquier	5			Steady			Steady			Steady
Floyd	5			Steady			Steady			Steady
Fluvanna	5			Steady			Steady			Steady
Franklin	7			Steady			Steady			Steady
Frederick	7			Steady			Steady			Steady
Giles	5			Steady			Steady			Steady
Gloucester	7			Steady			Steady			Steady
Goochland	5			Steady			Steady			Steady
Grayson	5			Steady			Steady			Steady
Greene	5			Steady			Steady			Steady
Greensville	4			Steady			Steady			Steady
Halifax	9			Steady			Steady			Steady
Hanover	7			Steady			Steady			Steady
Henrico	5			Steady			Steady			Steady
Henry	6			Steady			Steady			Steady
Highland	3			Steady			Steady			Steady
Isle of Wight	5			Steady			Steady			Steady
James City	5			Steady			Steady			Steady
King and Queen	5			Steady			Steady			Steady
King George	5			Steady			Steady			Steady
King William	5			Steady			Steady			Steady
Lancaster	5			Steady			Steady			Steady
Lee	5			Steady			Steady			Steady
Loudoun	9	3	6	+3	6	3	-3	0	0	Steady
Louisa	7			Steady			Steady			Steady
Lunenburg	7			Steady			Steady			Steady
Madison	5			Steady			Steady			Steady
Mathews	5			Steady			Steady			Steady
Mecklenburg	9			Steady			Steady			Steady
Middlesex	5			Steady			Steady			Steady
Montgomery	7			Steady			Steady			Steady
Nelson	5			Steady			Steady			Steady
New Kent	5			Steady			Steady			Steady
Northampton	5			Steady			Steady			Steady
Northumberland	5			Steady			Steady			Steady
Nottoway	5			Steady			Steady			Steady
Orange	5			Steady			Steady			Steady
Page	6			Steady			Steady			Steady
Patrick	5			Steady			Steady			Steady
Pittsylvania	7			Steady			Steady			Steady
Powhatan	5			Steady			Steady			Steady
Prince Edward	8	5	5	Steady	0	0	Steady	3	3	Steady
Prince George	6			Steady			Steady			Steady
Prince William	8	2	5	+3	6	3	-3	0	0	Steady
Pulaski	5			Steady			Steady			Steady
Rappahannock	5			Steady			Steady			Steady
Richmond	5			Steady			Steady			Steady
Roanoke	5			Steady			Steady			Steady
Rockbridge	5			Steady			Steady			Steady
Rockingham	5			Steady			Steady			Steady
Russell	7			Steady			Steady			Steady
Scott	7			Steady			Steady			Steady
Shenandoah	6			Steady			Steady			Steady
Smyth	7			Steady			Steady			Steady
Southampton	7			Steady			Steady			Steady
Spotsylvania	7			Steady			Steady			Steady
Stafford	7			Steady			Steady			Steady
Surry	5			Steady			Steady			Steady
Sussex	7			Steady			Steady			Steady
Tazewell	5			Steady			Steady			Steady
Warren	5			Steady			Steady			Steady
Washington	7			Steady			Steady			Steady
Westmoreland	5			Steady			Steady			Steady
Wise	8			Steady			Steady			Steady
Wythe	7			Steady			Steady			Steady
York	5			Steady			Steady			Steady

== Soil and Water Directors ==
Ninety-four of the 95 counties in Virginia (Arlington County being the exception) elected Soil and Water Directors in 2019.

== Town Council ==
Twelve of Virginia's 190 towns had town council elections in 2019.

== City School Board ==
Three of Virginia's 38 cities elected school board members in 2019. These cities are Buena Vista, Charlottesville, and Falls Church.

== County School Board ==
All 95 counties in Virginia elected board members in 2019.

== Special elections ==
At least 53 special elections in Virginia's municipalities were held in 2019.
