= Loudoun Symphony Orchestra =

American symphony orchestra

- Orchestra
- Short name: LSO
- Founded: 1991; 35 years ago
- Location: Ashburn, Loudoun County, Virginia, U.S.
- Principal conductor: Hayden Denesha
- Website: loudounsymphony.org
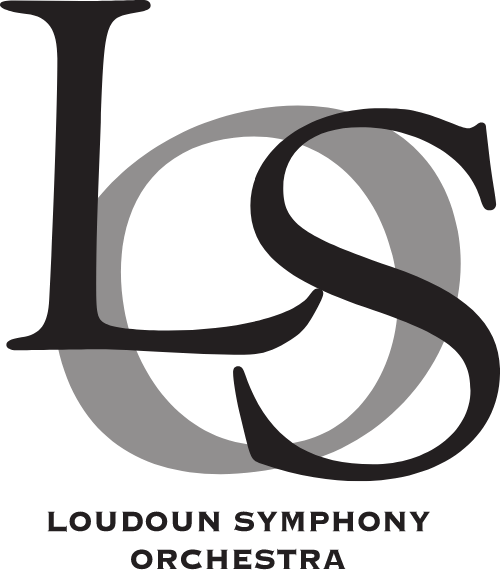

The Loudoun Symphony Orchestra (LSO) is an American symphony orchestra based in Ashburn, Loudoun County, United States.

Founded in 1991, it is located in Loudoun County (Virginia), in the Washington metropolitan area, and constitutes the symphony orchestra of all of Loudon County.

Hayden Denesha has been serving as the orchestra's principal conductor since 2024.

== History ==
The Loudoun Symphony gave its inaugural concert in March 1991 to nearly 1,000 people in Leesburg. In 1992, the orchestra was officially established as a musical not-for-profit organization and selected Jed Gaylin as music director and conductor.

In 1997, Mark Allen McCoy became music director and conductor and served as principal conductor for nearly a decade until his untimely death on August 1, 2016. During 2016 and 2017 the orchestra began a process to appoint a new conductor.

In 2018 the process of appointing a new orchestra conductor came to an end and in June 2018 conductor Dr. Nancia D'Alimonte was appointed to serve as music director and conductor of the Loudoun Symphony Orchestra, becoming the third conductor in the history of the orchestra and the first woman. Under her baton, the orchestra grew both in terms of concerts and professionally. She led the orchestra until 2023.

In 2023 conductor and composer Kim Allen Kluge was appointed music director and conductor of the Loudoun Symphony Orchestra.

In 2024 conductor Hayden Denesha, a Peabody Institute alumnus, was appointed music director and conductor; Denesha had been serving as musical director of the Loudoun Symphony Youth Orchestra since 2020.

The LSO is composed of more than half a hundred musicians, with membership by audition only.

== Chief conductors ==
- Hayden Denesha (2024–present)
- Kim Allen Kluge (2023–2024)
- Nancia D'Alimonte (2018–2023)
- Mark Allen McCoy (1997–2016)
- Jed Gaylin (1992–1997)

== Executive director ==
- Dr. Andrew Bluhm

== See also ==
- Virginia Symphony Orchestra
- Washington metropolitan area
- Loudoun County
