= Ryan, Virginia =

Unincorporated community in Virginia, United States

- Unincorporated community
- Location within Northern Virginia Location within Virginia
- Coordinates: 39°0′54″N 77°29′35″W
- Country: United States
- State: Virginia
- County: Loudoun
- Time zone: UTC−5 (Eastern (EST))
  - Summer (DST): UTC−4 (EDT)

Ryan is an unincorporated community in Loudoun County, Virginia, United States. The community was once at the corner of Shellhorn (VA SR 643), Ryan (VA SR 772), and Waxpool (VA SR 625) roads. It is now a part of the Ashburn communities.

== History ==
Ryan, was previously known as Farmwell, Old Farmwell, and was also referred to as Five Forks or Five Corners. In the mid 19th century the community was known as Farmwell, the name of George Lee's vast plantation. The name Farmwell first appeared in George Lee's October 1802 will and was used to describe the 1,236 acre plantation he inherited from his father, Thomas Ludwell Lee II. On March 19, 1849, he and his wife Sally M. Lee gave four and a quarter acres for a Methodist Church and school at the five forks. The church was called the Ryan Methodist Church

In 1860, the Loudoun, Alexandria, and Hampshire Railroad bypassed Farmwell, and a post office named Farmwell was established at the railroad stop at present Ashburn. The area then became known as Old Farmwell. The first store was built in the mid-1880s for Fran Ellmore. In 1889, a post office named Ryan was established at the store, with Dennis Higgins postmaster. The new name, which fell in line with the post office department’s policy of coining brief, easy-to-spell names, was that of John F. Ryan, who in 1883 had been elected to the Virginia House of Delegates. Mr. Ryan was also one of the area’s most prominent landowners, and he served in the House until 1904. From 1894 to 1904 he was Speaker of the House, and he was also a trustee of Virginia Polytechnic Institute.
