= Oak Grove, Loudoun County, Virginia =

- Census-designated place
- Location within Northern Virginia Location within Virginia Location within the United States
- Coordinates: 38°59′5″N 77°25′7″W
- Country: United States
- State: Virginia
- County: Loudoun

Area
  - Total: 1.17 sq mi (3.04 km^{2})
  - Land: 1.17 sq mi (3.03 km^{2})
  - Water: 0.0039 sq mi (0.01 km^{2})
- Elevation: 330 ft (100 m)

Population (2010)
  - Total: 1,777
  - Density: 1,520/sq mi (586.7/km^{2})
- Time zone: UTC−5 (Eastern (EST))
  - Summer (DST): UTC−4 (EDT)
- ZIP code: 20166 (Sterling)
- FIPS code: 51-58104
- GNIS feature ID: 2584895

Oak Grove is a census-designated place in Loudoun County, Virginia, United States. The population as of the 2010 United States census was 1,777.

Oak Grove is located in eastern Loudoun County, on the Fairfax County border, between the communities of Sterling Park and Herndon. The Washington and Old Dominion Railroad once travelled through the community, now replaced by the Washington & Old Dominion Railroad Trail.

== Demographics ==
Historical population
Census	Pop.	Note	%±
2010	1,777		—
U.S. Decennial Census; 2010 2020

Oak Grove was first listed as a census designated place in the 2010 U.S. census.
