= Watson, Virginia =

Unincorporated community in Virginia, United States

- Unincorporated community
- Location within Northern Virginia Location within Virginia Location within the United States
- Coordinates: 38°59′36″N 77°35′45″W
- Country: United States
- State: Virginia
- County: Loudoun
- Time zone: UTC−5 (Eastern (EST))
  - Summer (DST): UTC−4 (EDT)

Watson is an unincorporated community in Loudoun County, Virginia, United States.

Watson is a populated place located in Loudoun County at latitude 38.993 and longitude -77.596.

The elevation is 384 feet. Watson appears on the Arcola U.S. Geological Survey Map. Loudoun County is in the Eastern Time Zone (UTC -5 hours).
