= Dover, Virginia =

Unincorporated community in Virginia, United States

- Unincorporated community
- Location within Northern Virginia Location within Virginia Location within the United States
- Coordinates: 38°58′35″N 77°40′28″W
- Country: United States
- State: Virginia
- County: Loudoun
- Time zone: UTC−5 (Eastern (EST))
  - Summer (DST): UTC−4 (EDT)

Dover is an unincorporated community in Loudoun County, Virginia, United States. Dover is located east of Middleburg at the intersection of U.S. Route 50, Champe Ford Road (SR 629 south), and Cobb House Road (SR 629 north). The Little River begins following Route 50 at this point.

Dover as a geographical entity is somewhat exaggerated, seeing as the bend in Route 50 it refers to consists of only few houses, but it has a long pedigree as a named area, appearing on state and national maps. Most likely, its status as a geographical entity stems from the fact that the Little River Turnpike (first toll road in America) and Aldie-Ashby's Gap Turnpike terminated approximately together here, 1.3 miles west of Aldie.

== Historical interest ==
There are four Virginia historical markers at the site, commemorating John Champe, Revolutionary War Hero, and three Civil War markers, including one mentioning the Battle of Aldie.

Its two distinguishing features are Stoke (a prominent house where Teddy Roosevelt was a frequent guest) and the Champe Ford Memorial (an obelisk commemorating John Champe, handpicked by George Washington to re-capture Benedict Arnold after his defection to the British side. He came very close to succeeding, but at the last moment, Arnold changed plans and the whole endeavor had to be called off. His house was at the crossing of the Little River where the monument stands today, but the house itself had collapsed (according to Col. Harris of Stoke) "sometime in the [19]20s." He only realized when reading an old journal that one of his old buildings had to have been Champe's residence.

Dover Mill, built in 1810 and demolished in 1923 (the stones were reused to build Middleburg Bank) was the original mainstay. Established by the Hixson family, it was a profitable enterprise before the Civil War, but never was able to recover from essentially being on the front lines for several years of war.

Dover Mill was also a known landmark for people wishing to travel to the village of Landmark (now uninhabited), by traveling down what is now Champe Ford Road.

Dover Academy was a girls school in the mid-19th century as well. The house was eventually purchased by the McCormicks (related to McCormick Spice Company) and is currently owned by a descendant, Jamie McCormick.

== Other current structures ==
Pheasant's Eye was built by the Hixsons as their main resident in the 1820s. There are a few other old houses, as well as Dover Nursery and new farmhouse at the "intersection" (term used advisedly, as there isn't even a stoplight, nor a need for one).

The Amazing Race (9.3) shows many of the contestants passing '629' in the dead of night on their way to Dulles Airport. That is probably the only time Dover has appeared on national television.

Michael Dell maintains a residence near Dover. Other notable residents include Virginia Warner (daughter of Sen. John Warner) and billionaire Jacqueline Mars of Mars Candy.
