= Airmont, Virginia =

Unincorporated community in Virginia, United States

- Unincorporated community
- Location within Northern Virginia Location within Virginia Location within the United States
- Coordinates: 39°5′5″N 77°47′13″W
- Country: United States
- State: Virginia
- County: Loudoun
- Time zone: UTC−5 (Eastern (EST))
  - Summer (DST): UTC−4 (EDT)

Airmont is an unincorporated community in the Loudoun Valley of Loudoun County, Virginia, United States. It is located at the crossroads of Snickersville Pike (Virginia Secondary Route 734) and Airmont Road (Virginia Secondary Route 719) approximately 4 miles (6.4 km) south of the town of Round Hill and 3 miles (4.8 km) east of the village of Bluemont.

== History ==
Though the crossroads location of Airmont had hosted a collection of dwellings and a general store since soon after the opening of the Snickersville Turnpike, it was neither considered a village nor called Airmont until 1897 when the United States Post Office established a branch there. As was tradition, the first postmaster of the office was allowed to name it. In this case, the honor went to Lucien Powell, a renowned landscape painter who gave the village its name for its scenic westward views and in deference to the village of Philomont, named by an unknown Italian painter. Powell, himself, could be considered a native of Airmont, having been born a few miles southeast. The post office at Airmont did not last long, falling victim to Rural Free Delivery in 1912. In its short life the post office greatly helped the small village grow, reaching a population of 25 by 1908, prompting the establishment of a school the following year. Like most small villages in western Loudoun County, Airmont began a slow decline during the Great Depression. The school closed in 1931 and many of its historic buildings were destroyed by fire or torn down through the years. The general store alone has survived, albeit through several intermittent incarnations.
