= Telegraph Spring, Virginia =

Unincorporated community in Virginia, United States

- Unincorporated community
- Location within Northern Virginia Location within Virginia Location within the United States
- Coordinates: 39°6′18″N 77°42′30″W
- Country: United States
- State: Virginia
- County: Loudoun
- Time zone: UTC−5 (Eastern (EST))
  - Summer (DST): UTC−4 (EDT)

Telegraph Spring is an unincorporated community in Loudoun County, Virginia, United States. Telegraph Spring lies to the south of Hamilton.

Telegraph Spring is named for a naturally occurring spring that still flows today. A small metal pipe protrudes from the east side of Telegraph Springs Road (Route 611) just south of the intersection with Chappelle Hill Road. The water that flows continuously from the pipe is the spring. During the 2007 drought the spring, ceased to flow.

Telegraph Springs Road runs from Purcellville to Philomont. It is also known as State Route 611 and is paved for approximately half the length with the southern half gravel and dirt.
