= Paxson, Virginia =

Unincorporated community in Virginia, United States

- Unincorporated community
- Location within Northern Virginia Location within Virginia Location within the United States
- Coordinates: 39°5′45″N 77°48′27″W
- Country: United States
- State: Virginia
- County: Loudoun
- Time zone: UTC−5 (Eastern (EST))
  - Summer (DST): UTC−4 (EDT)

Paxson is an unincorporated community in Loudoun County, Virginia, United States. It is located on the western part of the county along the Snickersville Turnpike.

== History ==
In 1908, James W. Head described Paxson as "an exceptionally healthy community" two miles east of Bluemont, with a population of 15.
