= Silcott Spring, Virginia =

Unincorporated community in Virginia, United States

- Unincorporated community
- Location within Northern Virginia Location within Virginia Location within the United States
- Coordinates: 39°6′6″N 77°44′31″W
- Country: United States
- State: Virginia
- County: Loudoun
- Time zone: UTC−5 (Eastern (EST))
  - Summer (DST): UTC−4 (EDT)

Silcott Spring is an unincorporated community in Loudoun County, Virginia, United States. Silcott Spring lies to the south of the North Fork Catoctin Creek at the crossroads of Paxson (VA 725) and Silcott Spring (VA 690) Roads.

In the 1800s, Silcott Springs was the site of a boarding resort for African Americans. The Baltimore and Ohio Railroad enabled tourists from the District of Columbia to access nearby resorts, including those in Silcott Springs. The resort area included a spa.
