= Commissioner of the Revenue =

Constitutional officer in Virginia, US

The Commissioner of the Revenue is one of five locally elected constitutional officers whose authority is specifically conveyed in the Virginia Constitution. The other four are the treasurer, sheriff, Commonwealth's attorney, and clerk.

In general, the local governing body (i.e. City Council, Board of Supervisors) establishes tax policy and sets tax rates. The Commissioner of the Revenue implements and administers these policies by establishing assessments and determining what is taxable. The Treasurer then collects the tax revenue.

The Commissioner of the Revenue is the chief tax-assessing official of the locality. The responsibilities of Commissioners vary from office to office across the Commonwealth. Generally, the Office of the Commissioner of the Revenue is responsible for administering the following taxes: Business and Professional Occupational License Tax, Bank Franchise Stock Tax, Motor Vehicle Rental Tax, Meals Tax, Personal Property Tax, Public Service Corporation Tax, Public Rights of Way Use Tax, Transient occupancy tax, Consumer Utility Tax, and Virginia Income Tax. Commissioners also assist taxpayers in completing state tax returns and filing forms.

The Virginia General Assembly grants the Commissioner of the Revenue the power to summons taxpayers, to issue statutory assessments, to audit taxpayer returns, and, if necessary, to file civil and criminal proceedings against taxpayers for failure to file returns and/or provide information.
