= Round Hill, Loudoun County, Virginia =

- Town
- Town of Round Hill
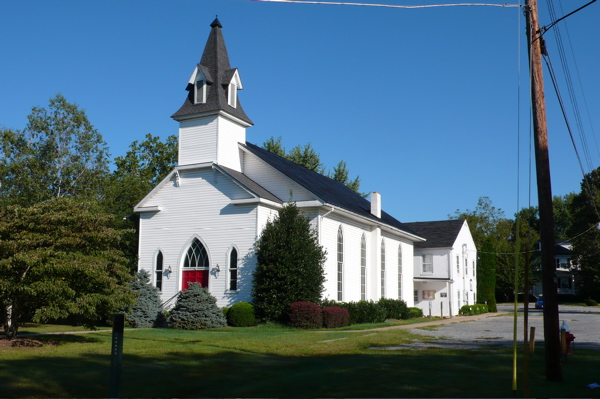
- Round Hill United Methodist Church, established 1889

- Location within Northern Virginia Location within Virginia Location within the United States
- Coordinates: 39°8′1″N 77°46′13″W
- Country: United States
- State: Virginia
- County: Loudoun
- Incorporated: 1900

Government
  - Mayor: Scott T. Ramsey

Area
  - Total: 0.37 sq mi (0.96 km^{2})
  - Land: 0.37 sq mi (0.95 km^{2})
  - Water: 0.0039 sq mi (0.01 km^{2})
- Elevation: 548 ft (167 m)

Population (2020)
  - Total: 693
  - Density: 1,888/sq mi (729.1/km^{2})
- Time zone: UTC−5 (EST)
  - Summer (DST): UTC−4 (EDT)
- FIPS code: 51-69168
- Website: www.roundhillva.gov

Round Hill is a town in Loudoun County, Virginia, United States. Its population was 693 at the 2020 census. The town is located at the crossroads of Virginia Routes 7 and 719 (Woodgrove Road), approximately 50 miles (80 km) northwest of Washington, D.C. The town's name refers a hill two miles northeast of a 910-foot (280 m) hill used during the Civil War as a signal post by both Confederate and Union troops. House of Round Hill was built in 2004.

Patsy Cline attended Round Hill Elementary School.

== History ==
Round Hill was incorporated on February 5, 1900. From 1874 to 1900, the settlement had been the terminus of a Washington and Ohio rail line that ultimately became the Washington and Old Dominion Railroad. The railway allowed agricultural products to be brought into Washington, D.C., and allowed the residents of the District to escape to the surrounding countryside for holidays. Many of the town's older residences were originally boarding houses, inns, and taverns where people would go upon arrival. The town was considered a convenient destination as it lies close to the Shenandoah River (7 miles/11.3 km distant), the Shenandoah National Park (30 miles/48 km), the Appalachian Trail (4 miles/6.4 km), Harpers Ferry (15 miles/24 km), the Chesapeake and Ohio Canal National Historic Park (12 miles/19 km), and the paved Washington & Old Dominion Railroad Trail (3 miles/4.8 km).

The town has recently been ringed by fast-growing suburbs of Washington, D.C., that have brought thousands of residents to just outside the town. The town's water and sewer infrastructure is used to serve many of these new developments. The town has a Hometown Festival every year on Memorial Day, complete with a parade and other activities, which are held both in the town park as well as outside of it.

In 2019, the town was officially designated an Appalachian Trail Community by the Appalachian Trail Conservancy. Beginning that same year, an Appalachian Trail Festival has been held every summer at the now closed B Chord Brewing (located outside the town near Snickers Gap, alongside Route 7) to celebrate this designation.

The Ketoctin Baptist Church, Round Hill Historic District, and Woodgrove are listed on the National Register of Historic Places.

== Geography ==
Round Hill is located in western Loudoun County at 39°8′1″N 77°46′13″W (39.133625, −77.770217). It is 12 miles (19 km) west of Leesburg, the Loudoun county seat, and 24 miles (39 km) east of Winchester.

According to the United States Census Bureau, the town has a total area of 0.39 square miles (1.0 km^{2}), of which 2.4 acres (9,537 m^{2}), or 0.99%, are water. The town sits at the foot of the Blue Ridge Mountains and is drained by the North Fork of Goose Creek, which flows east to the Potomac River past Leesburg.

== Demographics ==
Historical population
Census	Pop.	Note	%±
1890	207		—
1900	318		53.6%
1910	379		19.2%
1920	359		−5.3%
1930	359		0.0%
1940	337		−6.1%
1950	403		19.6%
1960	430		6.7%
1970	581		35.1%
1980	510		−12.2%
1990	514		0.8%
2000	500		−2.7%
2010	539		7.8%
2020	693		28.6%
U.S. Decennial Census

As of the census of 2010, 539 people in 202 households and 155 families resided in the town. The population density was 2,695 people per square mile (1040.5/km^{2}). There were 218 housing units at an average density of 1090 per square mile (420.9/km^{2}). Of that population, 93.32% was White; 2.78%, African American; 1.11%, Asian; and 0.93% of the population was mixed-race. Hispanics or Latinos of any race constituted 3.53% of the population.

There were 202 households, out of which 40.6% had children under the age of 18 living with them, 59.9% were married couples living together, 12.9% had a female householder with no husband present, 4.0% had a male householder with no wife present, and 23.3% were non-families. 19.8% of all households were made up of individuals, and 5.5% had someone living alone who was 65 years of age or older. The average household size was 2.67 and the average family size was 3.06.

In the town, the population was spread out, with 30.7% under the age of 20, 5.5% from 20 to 29, 20.2% from 30 to 44, 34.0% from 45 to 64 (up from 23% in 2005), and 9.7% who were 65 years of age or older. The median age was 40.5 years (up from 36 years in 2005). For every 100 females, there were 94.6 males. For every 100 females age 18 and over, there were 89.1 males.

The median estimated income for a household in the town in 2010 was $92,292, and the median estimated income for a family in 2010 was $93,750. Males had a median income of $79,000 versus $55,208 for females. The per capita income for the town was $39,380. In 2005, about 4.2% of families and 5.4% of the population were below the poverty line, including 3.5% of those under age 18 and 15.7% of those age 65 or over. Poverty level data was not provided for 2010.

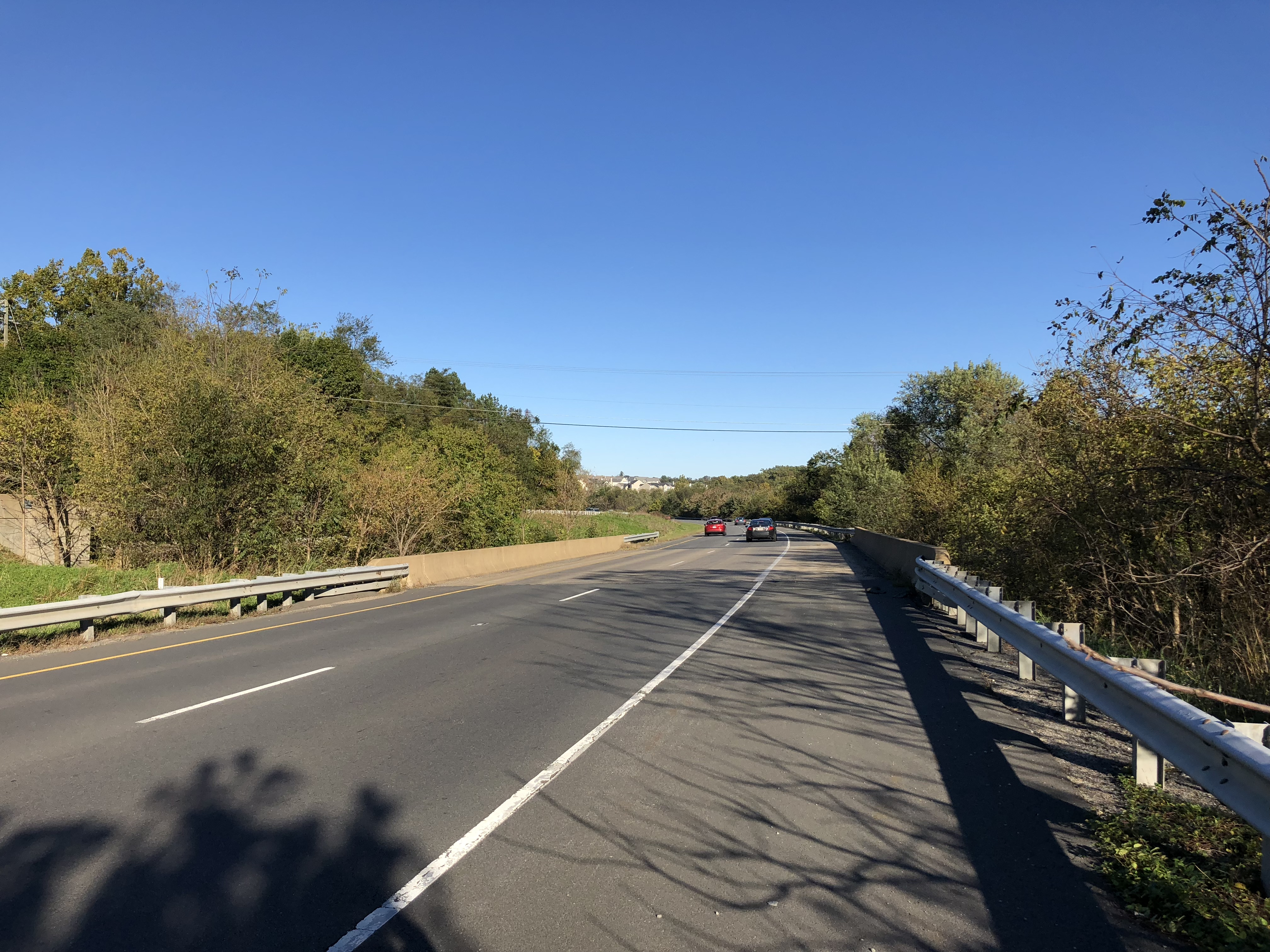
SR 7, the largest highway in Round Hill

== Transportation ==
The primary highway serving Round Hill is Virginia State Route 7. Route 7 extends eastward to Leesburg and beyond, eventually terminating in Alexandria, with interchanges at Interstate 495, Interstate 66 and Interstate 395. Towards the west, SR 7 passes Berryville before terminating at Winchester, where it interchanges with Interstate 81. The current alignment of SR 7 through Round Hill is a bypass of the original road through the middle of Round Hill, which now comprises SR 7 Business.

== Education and public service ==
No public schools lie within the town limits, though Round Hill Elementary School lies just outside, within the Villages of Round Hill subdivision. As of January 2013, the school listed 544 enrolled students. Secondary students are also served by the Loudoun County Public School system, including Woodgrove High School in Purcellville.

Law enforcement is provided by the Loudoun County Sheriff's Office. Fire protection and emergency medical services are provided by the Round Hill Volunteer Fire Department 4; the fire company and the rescue squad are volunteer organizations supplemented with staffing from the Loudoun County Combined Fire and Rescue System on a twenty-four-hour, seven-day-a-week basis.

The town maintains its own water and sewer system, which developers' proffers have supplemented in recent years.

== Newspapers ==
The Washington Post, Washington Times, and Winchester Star all offer paid daily circulation in Round Hill. Free weekly circulation is provided from Leesburg by the Loudoun Times-Mirror. Residents also receive the free weekly shopper publications Blue Ridge Leader and Purcellville Gazette, which contain mainly advertising.

== Churches ==
Four churches are located in the town: Round Hill Baptist Church, Round Hill United Methodist Church, Mount Zion Baptist Church, and Western Loudoun Community Church (though WLCC moved to Hillsboro in February 2018). The Ketoctin Baptist Church, also known as the Short Hill Church, whose cemetery dates to 1777, is located approximately two miles north of Route 7, at the junction of Allder School Road and Ketoctin Church Road. Round Hill members of the Church of Jesus Christ of Latter-day Saints attend services at a chapel in Hamilton, while Catholic residents of the town may attend St. Francis DeSales church.

== Notable people ==
- Steve Czaban, sports radio personality
- William E. Dodd, diplomat and historian
- Lyndon LaRouche, political activist
- DiDi Haračić, professional soccer player
