= Woodburn, Loudoun County, Virginia =

Unincorporated community in Virginia, United States

- Unincorporated community
- Location within Northern Virginia Location within Virginia Location within the United States
- Coordinates: 39°5′24″N 77°37′9″W
- Country: United States
- State: Virginia
- County: Loudoun
- Time zone: UTC−5 (Eastern (EST))
  - Summer (DST): UTC−4 (EDT)

Woodburn is an unincorporated community in Loudoun County, Virginia, United States. The settlement is located on Hogback Mountain southwest of Leesburg. The settlement grew up around Woodburn farm, which has been dated to before 1743, with a mill constructed before 1800.

Woodburn Road, which runs between Dry Mill and Harmony Church Roads, is all that is left to mark the existence and location of the community. The settlement had a population of 15 circa 1908. The ruins of Woodburn's general store stood just north of the road's intersection with Forrestgrove Road until about 2000 when the Virginia Department of Transportation (VDOT), overturned the Loudoun County Board of Supervisors' decision to leave the road unpaved and paved and widened the road, demolishing the general store in the process.
