= Georges Island (Nova Scotia) =

Island in Halifax Harbour, Nova Scotia, Canada

Coordinates: 44°38′27″N 63°33′35″W

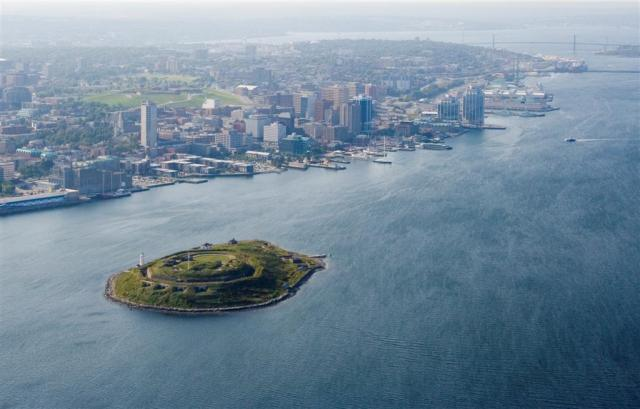
Georges Island

Georges Island (named after King George II) is a glacial drumlin and the largest island entirely within the harbour limits of Halifax Harbour located in Nova Scotia's Halifax Regional Municipality. The Island is the location of Fort Charlotte - named after King George III's wife Charlotte. Fort Charlotte was built during Father Le Loutre's War, a year after Citadel Hill (Fort George). The island is now a National Historic Site of Canada. As of August 6, 2020, the island is open to the public on the weekends (and Fridays during peak summer season), from June until Thanksgiving weekend.

== History ==
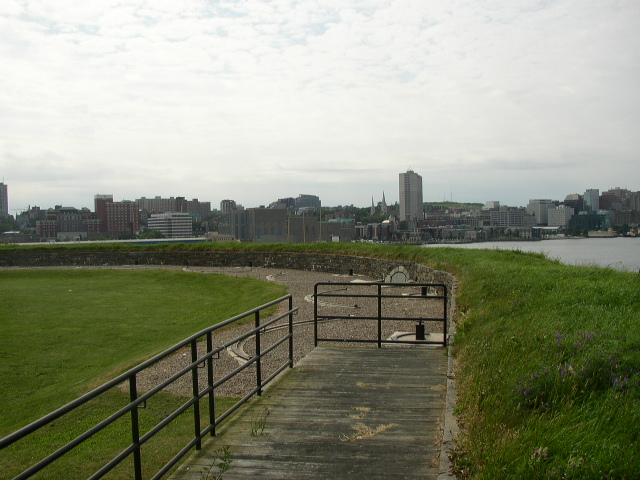
Fort Charlotte on Georges Island

The island was originally named île à la Raquette which means Snowshoe Island. For a brief time, the Island was known as île d'Enville, named after the leader of the great Duc d’Anville Expedition who was buried on the island for a number of years. In 1749, the island was named "George Island" after King George II, and then finally, in 1963, it was renamed "Georges Island".

Upon the arrival of Edward Cornwallis and the outbreak of Father Le Loutre's War, fortifications were established on Citadel Hill (Fort George) (1749) and Georges Island (Fort Charlotte) (1750).

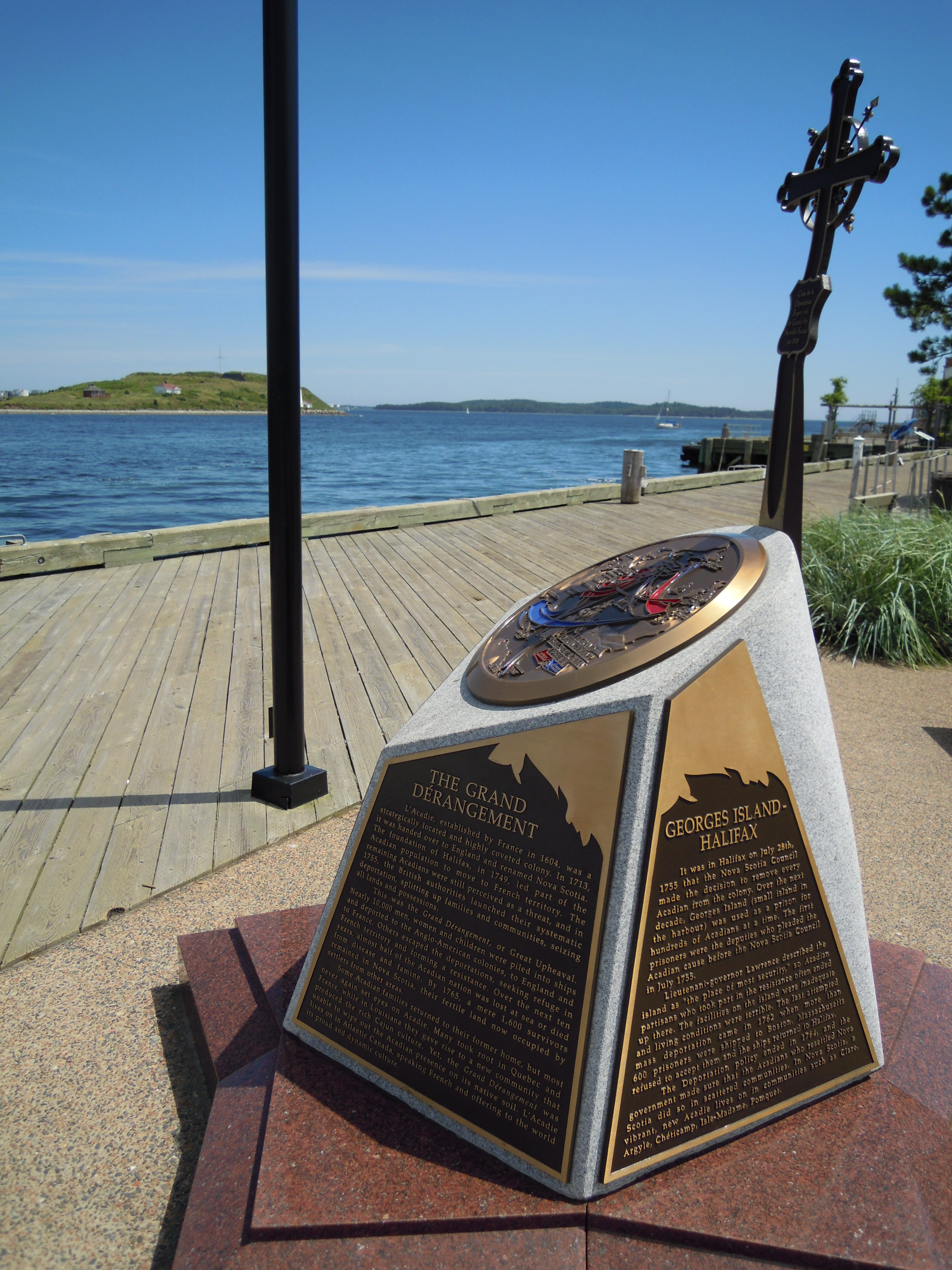
Monument to Imprisoned Acadians at Bishops Landing, Halifax, overlooking Georges Island

During the Seven Years' War, two thousand French sailors were imprisoned on the island after the British victory in the Battle off Cape Race, Newfoundland.

During the war, Fort Charlotte was one of four forts where Acadians were imprisoned over the nine years of the Expulsion of the Acadians (the others were Fort Frederick, Saint John, New Brunswick; Fort Cumberland and Fort Edward). The Acadian prisoners in the vicinity of Halifax were subject to various degrees of confinement and dependence upon victualization, without the right to own land, continuously, from 1759 to 1768. According to historian Ronnie Gilles-LeBlanc there were approximately 1660 Acadians held prisoner on the island during the deportation (1755–1763), with a maximum of 600 prisoners at one time. Many Acadian men in the region were occupied with road building, fisheries, wharf building, and wood cutting, and lodged close to where they worked.

During the American Revolution the 84th Regiment of Foot (Royal Highland Emigrants) were stationed at the fort to protect the harbour from American Privateers. Numerous American privateers were held prisoner in the fort throughout the war.

Georges Island was part of the "Halifax Defence Complex" from the mid-18th century to the Second World War, with Citadel Hill and Fort Charlotte on the island being restored by Parks Canada. For nearly two hundred years Georges Island was the scene of constant military activity. Tales of executions, forts and hidden tunnels surround the folklore associated with the mysterious island. It had an Island Prison Camp, a Look Out Point, an Acadian Prison camp, and a Quarantine Station.

The Georges Island Lighthouse was established on the island in 1876. The original wooden tower burned in 1916 and was replaced by an octagonal concrete tower in 1917. The light was staffed until 1972 when it was automated.

=== Notable prisoners ===
- Privateer David Ropes

== Today ==
In March 2009, the federal government designated $3.5 million to install water, sewer and electrical services on the National Historic Site over the following year. "This would be the first step towards opening the island," said Carla Wheaton, Parks Canada cultural resource manager. "Following that, we would still need to construct visitor facilities, such as washrooms (and) possibly a visitors’ centre."

As of summer 2020, the island is open to the public on weekends (and Fridays in July and August). The island may be visited from the second weekend in June until Thanksgiving weekend in October. Getting to the island can be done either via Ambassatours ferry from the Halifax Waterfront, CAD 26.75 per adult (includes historic site access), or private vessel, must purchase historic site access upon landing on the island, CAD 8.50 per adult.

The Canadian Coast Guard operates an unstaffed radar station commissioned in 1977.

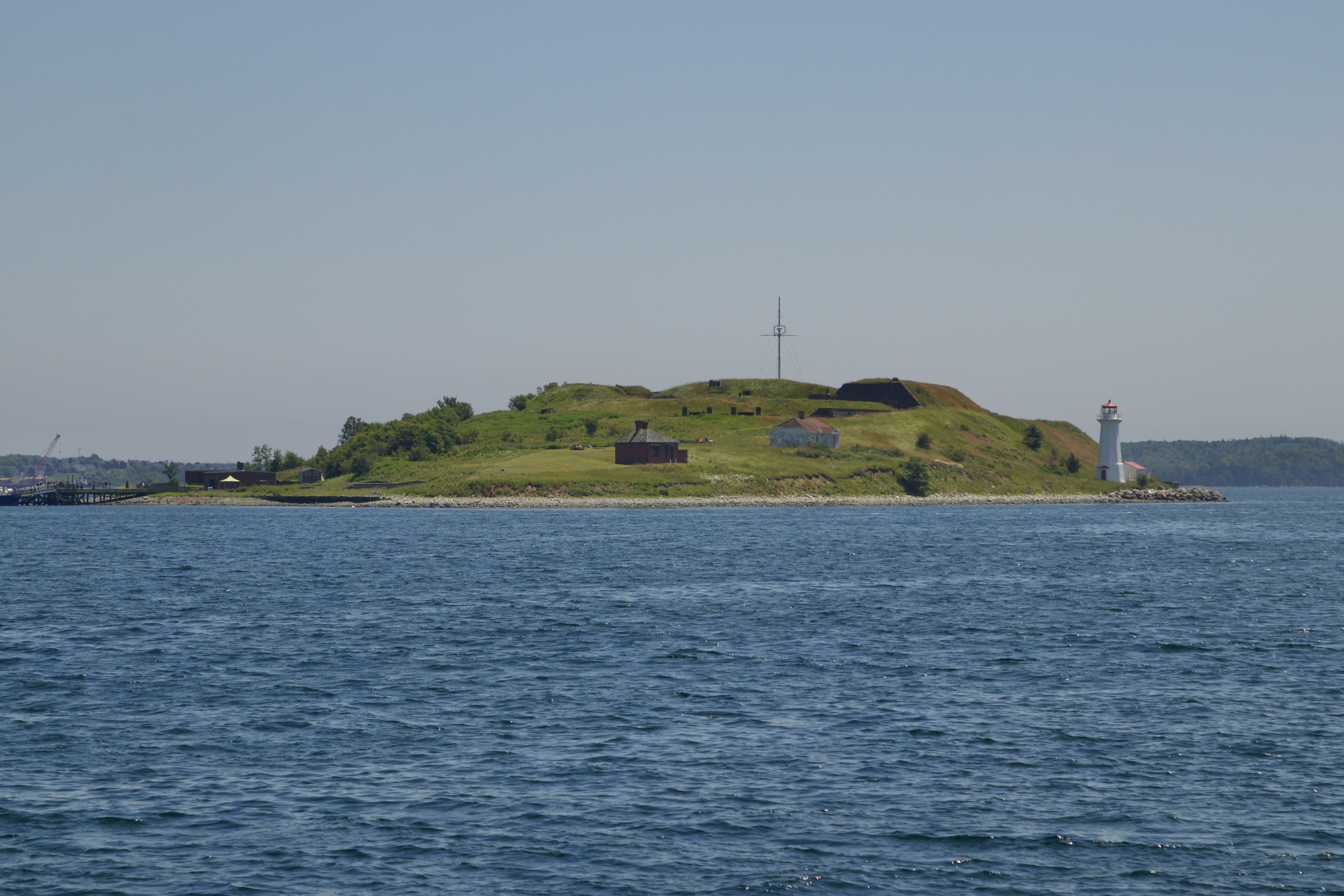
Georges Island viewed from Halifax, with McNabs Island in the background

== See also ==
- Military history of Nova Scotia
- List of oldest buildings and structures in Halifax, Nova Scotia
- Royal eponyms in Canada
