= Georges Island Lighthouse =

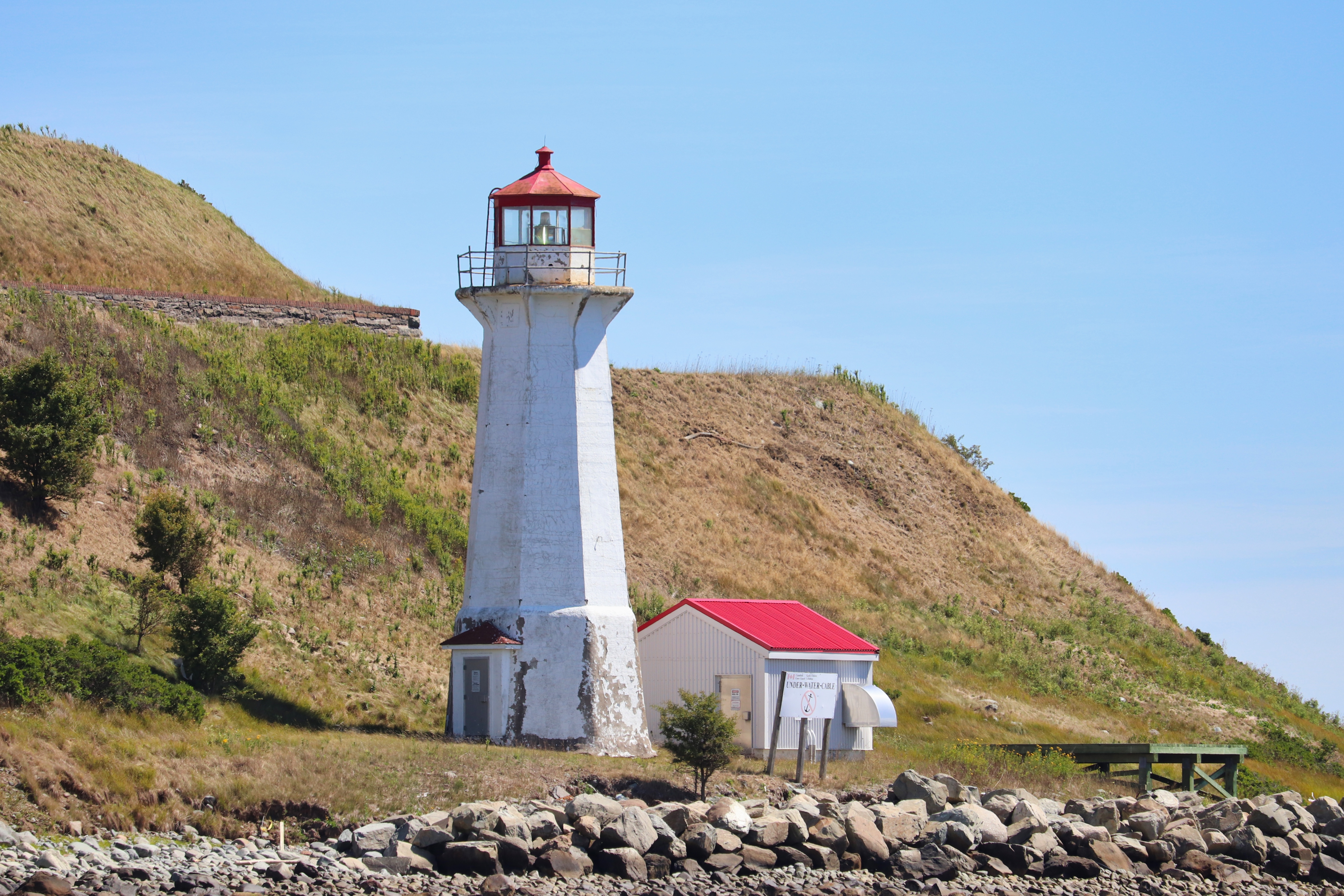
- Location: Halifax, Nova Scotia; Canada
- Coordinates: 44°38′26″N 63°33′37″W

Tower
- Constructed: 1876 (first); 1903 (second) destroyed by fire in 1916
- Construction: concrete tower
- Automated: 1972
- Height: 16 metres (52 ft)
- Shape: octagonal truncated prism with balcony and lantern
- Markings: white tower with a red vertical stripe on the range line, red dome
- Operator: Parks Canada
- Fog signal: 3s. blast every 30s.

Light
- First lit: 1919 (current)
- Focal height: 17.5 metres (57 ft)
- Range: 15 nautical miles (28 km; 17 mi)
- Characteristic: F W

Georges Island Lighthouse is a prominent concrete lighthouse, built in 1917 on Georges Island in Nova Scotia, replacing an earlier tower built in 1876. The light-keeper's house remains standing a few hundred feet to the north. The lighthouse is operated by the Canadian Coast Guard.

== History ==
The lighthouse was automated in 1972, and in 2005 the foghorn was decommissioned.

In the summer of 2006 the lighthouse was used by the U.S. Navy in training exercises.

== List of lighthouse keepers ==
- 1876–1920 Ross, Robert
- 1920–1946 Nolan, W.H.
- 1921 Ross, S.
- 1921 Ross, J.
- 1946 Bedgood, H.J.
- 1946 Edwards, E.J.
- 1946–1964 Matthews, Victor Maynard
- 1964–1972 Barkhouse, D.D.

== See also ==
- List of lighthouses in Canada
