= Elvan, Virginia =

Unincorporated community in Virginia, United States

- Unincorporated community
- Location within Northern Virginia Location within Virginia Location within the United States
- Coordinates: 39°16′38″N 77°40′9″W
- Country: United States
- State: Virginia
- County: Loudoun
- Time zone: UTC−5 (Eastern (EST))
  - Summer (DST): UTC−4 (EDT)
- GNIS feature ID: 1495509

Elvan is an unincorporated community in Loudoun County, Virginia, United States. Originally known as "Jumbo", Elvan is located on Elvan Road off Mountain Road (VA 690) in northern Loudoun County.
