= Gleedsville, Virginia =

Unincorporated community in Virginia, United States

- Unincorporated community
- Location within Northern Virginia Location within Virginia Location within the United States
- Coordinates: 39°2′57″N 77°36′17″W
- Country: United States
- State: Virginia
- County: Loudoun
- Time zone: UTC−5 (Eastern (EST))
  - Summer (DST): UTC−4 (EDT)

Gleedsville is an unincorporated village in Loudoun County, Virginia, United States. Gleedsville lies south of Leesburg on Gleedsville Road. According to the Geographic Names Information System, the village has also been known as Leedsville.
