= Loudoun County, Virginia =

County in Virginia, United States

- County
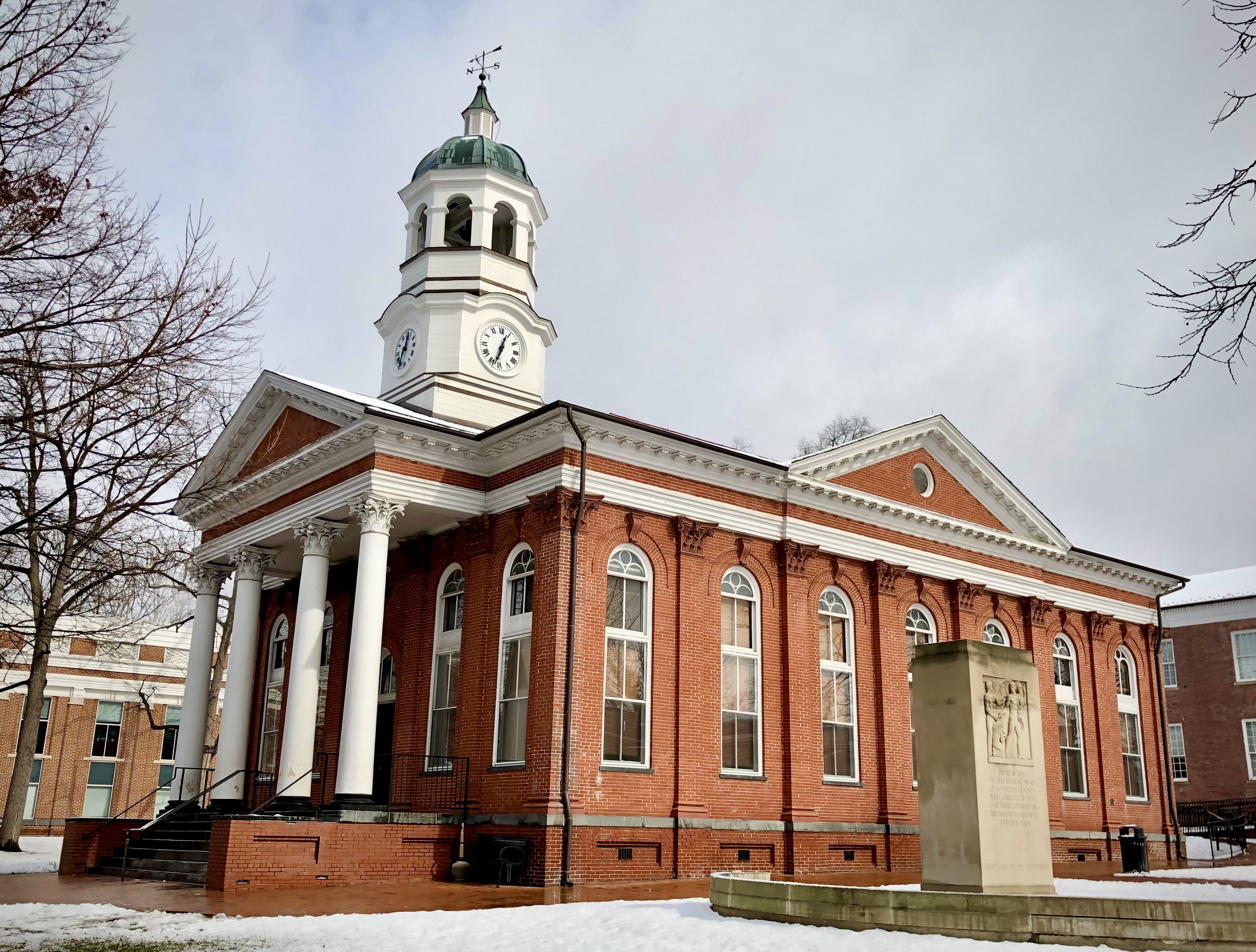
- Loudoun County Courthouse and a World War II monument (right) in Leesburg, February 2021

- Flag Seal Logo
- Motto: "I Byde My Time"
- Location within the U.S. state of Virginia
- Coordinates: 39°05′N 77°38′W
- Country: United States
- State: Virginia
- Founded: 1757
- Named for: John Campbell, 4th Earl of Loudoun
- Seat: Leesburg
- Largest town: Leesburg

Area
  - Total: 521.33 sq mi (1,350.2 km^{2})
  - Land: 515.74 sq mi (1,335.8 km^{2})
  - Water: 5.6 sq mi (15 km^{2}) 1.1%

Population (2020)
  - Total: 420,959
  - Estimate (2025): 449,749 ▲
  - Density: 810/sq mi (310/km^{2})
- Time zone: UTC−5 (Eastern)
  - Summer (DST): UTC−4 (EDT)
- Congressional district: 10th
- Website: loudoun.gov

Loudoun County (/ˈlaʊdən/) is a northern county of the Commonwealth of Virginia in the United States. In 2020, the census returned a population of 420,959, making it Virginia's third-most populous county. The county seat is Leesburg. Loudoun County is part of the Washington–Arlington–Alexandria, DC–VA–MD–WV Metropolitan Statistical Area. As of 2023, Loudoun County had a median household income of $156,821, the highest of any county or county equivalent in the nation.

== History ==
=== 18th century ===
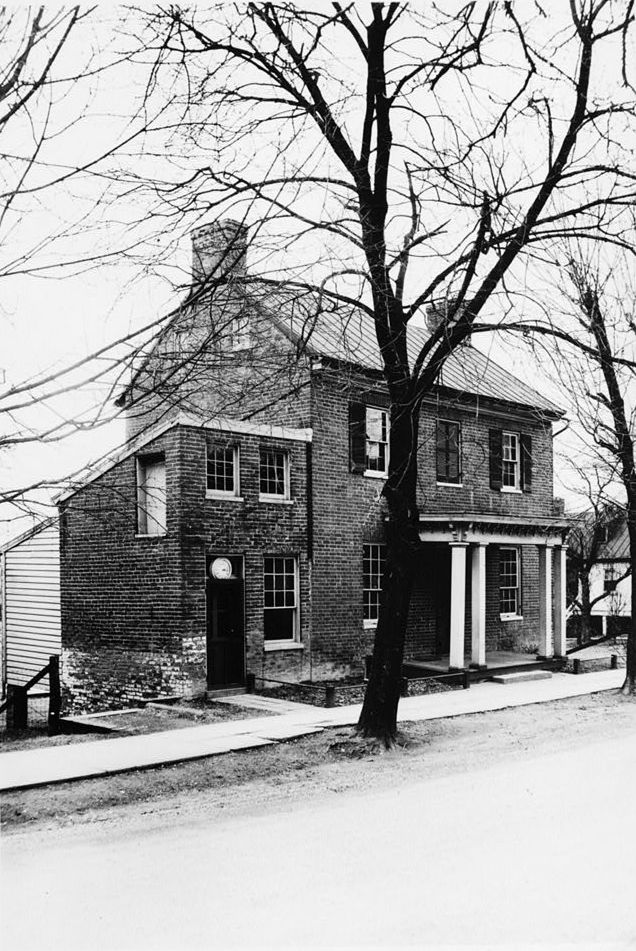
William and Sarah Nettle House in Waterford

Loudoun County was established in 1757 from Fairfax County. The county is named for John Campbell, Fourth Earl of Loudoun and governor general of Virginia from 1756 to 1759. Western settlement began in the 1720s and 1730s with English and Welsh Quakers, Scots-Irish, Germans and others moving south from Pennsylvania and Maryland, and also by English and enslaved Africans moving upriver from Tidewater.

At the time of the American Revolution, Loudoun County was Virginia's most populous county. It was also rich in agriculture, and the county's contributions of grain to George Washington's Continental Army earned it the nickname "Breadbasket of the Revolution."

=== 19th century ===
==== War of 1812 ====
During the War of 1812, important federal documents and government archives were evacuated from Washington and stored at Leesburg. Local tradition holds that these documents were stored at Rokeby House.

U.S. president James Monroe treated Oak Hill Plantation as a primary residence from 1823 until his death on July 4, 1831. The Loudoun County coat of arms and flag, granted by the English College of Arms, memorialize the special relationship between Britain and the United States that developed through his Monroe Doctrine.

==== American Civil War ====
The American Civil War divided the county, which saw fighting because of its strategic location. In April 1861, both of Loudoun County's representatives to the Virginia Secession Convention of 1861 favored the Union. Delegates elected John Janney, a former Quaker and slave owner, presided over that assembly, which ultimately voted to secede. Loudoun voters also voted to secede. In addition to Confederate cavalry and infantry units formed within the county, other Loudoun residents traveled to Maryland to join Union army cavalry and border guard units. On October 21, 1861, in the Battle of Ball's Bluff along the Potomac River near Leesburg, future jurist Oliver Wendell Holmes Jr. was critically wounded.

In the spring of 1862, Leesburg was occupied by Union troops and later recaptured by the Confederate Army after Union troops withdrew. Confederate partisan John S. Mosby based his operations in Loudoun and adjoining Fauquier County.

In June 1863, during the Gettysburg campaign, Confederate major general J.E.B. Stuart and Union cavalry clashed in the battles of Aldie, Middleburg, and Upperville. By December 1863, Loudoun was held by Union forces, and was among the nine counties which elected delegates to the Virginia General Assembly at Alexandria.

Loudoun voters elected and reelected John J. Henshaw and J. Madison Downey as their representatives to that body, and fellow delegates elected Downey as their Speaker. Loudoun voters elected and reelected William F. Mercer to the upper body of that version of the Virginia General Assembly, and elected him to the Virginia Senate in the 1865–1867 session. They elected former delegates R.M. Bentley and William Hill Gray as their part-time delegates in the lower house in that session.

=== 20th century ===
During World War I, Loudoun County was a major breadbasket for supplying provisions to soldiers in Europe. Loudoun farmers implemented new agricultural innovations such as vaccination of livestock, seed inoculations and ensilage. The county experienced a boom in agricultural output, outputting an annual wheat output of 1.04 million bushels in 1917, the largest of any county in Virginia that year. 1.2 million units of home produce were produced at home, much of which went to training sites across the state such as Camp Lee. The Smith–Lever Act of 1914 established increased agricultural education in Virginia counties, increasing agricultural yields. After the war, a plaque was dedicated to the "30 glorious dead" from the county who died in the Great War. Five of the thirty died on the front, while the other twenty five died while in training or in other locations inside the United States.

In 1962, Dulles International Airport was built in southeastern Loudoun County in Sterling. Since then, Loudoun County has experienced a high-tech boom and rapid growth. Accordingly, many have moved to eastern Loudoun and become residents of planned communities such as Sterling Park, Sugarland Run, Cascades, Ashburn Village, and Ashburn Farm, making that section a veritable part of the Washington suburbs. Others have moved to the county seat or to the small towns and rural communities of the Loudoun Valley, which makes up the majority of the county's area.

== Geography ==
Map of Loudoun County in Virginia

According to the U.S. Census Bureau, Loudoun County has a total area of 521 square miles (1,350 km^{2}), of which 516 square miles (1,340 km^{2}) is land and 6 square miles (16 km^{2}) (1.1%) is water. It is bounded on the north by the Potomac River; across the river are Frederick, Washington and Montgomery counties in Maryland; it is bounded on the south by Prince William and Fauquier counties, on the west by the watershed of the Blue Ridge Mountain across which are Jefferson County, West Virginia and Clarke County, and on the east by Fairfax County. The Bull Run Mountains and Catoctin Mountain bisect the county. To the west of the range is the Loudoun Valley. Bisecting the Loudoun Valley from Hillsboro to the Potomac River is Short Hill Mountain.

=== Adjacent counties ===
- Fairfax County (east)
- Prince William County (southeast)
- Fauquier County (south)
- Jefferson County, West Virginia (west)
- Clarke County (west)
- Washington County, Maryland (northwest)
- Frederick County, Maryland (north)
- Montgomery County, Maryland (east)

=== National protected area ===
- Harpers Ferry National Historical Park

== Demographics ==
Historical population
Census	Pop.	Note	%±
1790	18,962		—
1800	20,523		8.2%
1810	21,338		4.0%
1820	22,702		6.4%
1830	21,939		−3.4%
1840	20,431		−6.9%
1850	22,079		8.1%
1860	21,774		−1.4%
1870	20,929		−3.9%
1880	23,634		12.9%
1890	23,274		−1.5%
1900	21,948		−5.7%
1910	21,167		−3.6%
1920	20,577		−2.8%
1930	19,852		−3.5%
1940	20,291		2.2%
1950	21,147		4.2%
1960	24,549		16.1%
1970	37,150		51.3%
1980	57,427		54.6%
1990	86,129		50.0%
2000	169,599		96.9%
2010	312,311		84.1%
2020	420,959		34.8%
2025 (est.)	449,749	▲	6.8%
U.S. Decennial Census; 1790-1960 1900-1990; 1990-2000 2010 2020

From 1890 to 1940, the county had a decline in population as people moved to cities for more opportunities. The decline was likely highest among African Americans, who had worked in an agricultural economy that was becoming increasingly mechanized. During the first half of the 20th century, African Americans moved out of rural areas to cities in the Great Migration. In the 21st century, African Americans now form a proportionally much smaller portion of the county's population than they once did, and the Hispanic and Asian populations of the county outnumber them significantly.

=== 2020 census ===
As of the 2020 census, the county had a population of 420,959. The median age was 37.0 years. 28.1% of residents were under the age of 18 and 9.9% of residents were 65 years of age or older. For every 100 females there were 96.9 males, and for every 100 females age 18 and over there were 94.3 males age 18 and over.

The racial makeup of the county was 53.7% White, 7.3% Black or African American, 0.4% American Indian and Alaska Native, 21.3% Asian, 0.1% Native Hawaiian and Pacific Islander, 6.7% from some other race, and 10.6% from two or more races. Hispanic or Latino residents of any race comprised 14.2% of the population.

88.1% of residents lived in urban areas, while 11.9% lived in rural areas.

There were 137,442 households in the county, of which 46.2% had children under the age of 18 living with them and 18.4% had a female householder with no spouse or partner present. About 16.8% of all households were made up of individuals and 5.8% had someone living alone who was 65 years of age or older.

There were 142,074 housing units, of which 3.3% were vacant. Among occupied housing units, 76.4% were owner-occupied and 23.6% were renter-occupied. The homeowner vacancy rate was 0.7% and the rental vacancy rate was 5.6%.

=== Racial and ethnic composition ===
Loudoun County, Virginia – Racial and ethnic composition Note: the US Census treats Hispanic/Latino as an ethnic category. This table excludes Latinos from the racial categories and assigns them to a separate category. Hispanics/Latinos may be of any race.
Race / Ethnicity (NH = Non-Hispanic)	Pop 1980	Pop 1990	Pop 2000	Pop 2010	Pop 2020	% 1980	% 1990	% 2000	% 2010	% 2020
White alone (NH)	50,876	75,557	134,972	194,845	216,865	88.59%	87.73%	79.58%	62.39%	51.52%
Black or African American alone (NH)	4,964	6,126	11,517	21,934	29,725	8.64%	7.11%	6.79%	7.02%	7.06%
Native American or Alaska Native alone (NH)	94 (Note: Includes all people who gave "American Indian", "Eskimo", or "Aleut" as their race, regardless of Hispanic identity.)	167	297	520	536	0.16%	0.19%	0.18%	0.17%	0.13%
Asian alone (NH)	424 (Note: Includes all people who gave "Japanese", "Chinese", "Filipino", "Korean", "Asian Indian", or "Vietnamese" as their race, regardless of Hispanic identity.)	2,053	9,025	45,795	89,372	0.74%	2.38%	5.32%	14.66%	21.23%
Pacific Islander alone (NH)	6 (Note: Includes all people who gave "Hawaiian", "Guamanian", or "Samoan" as their race, regardless of Hispanic identity.)	N/A	93	143	227	0.01%	N/A	0.05%	0.05%	0.05%
Some Other Race alone (NH)	210	70	367	808	2,425	0.37%	0.08%	0.22%	0.26%	0.58%
Mixed Race or Multi-Racial (NH)	N/A	N/A	3,239	9,690	22,065	N/A	N/A	1.91%	3.10%	5.24%
Hispanic or Latino (any race)	853	2,156	10,089	38,576	59,744	1.49%	2.50%	5.95%	12.35%	14.19%
Total	57,427	86,129	169,599	312,311	420,959	100.00%	100.00%	100.00%	100.00%	100.00%

=== 2000 to 2019 ===
As of the census of 2010, there were 312,311 people, 104,583 households, and 80,494 families residing in the county. The population density was 606 inhabitants per square mile (234/km^{2}). There were 109,442 housing units at an average density of 212 per square mile (82/km^{2}). The racial makeup of the county was:

- 68.7% White
- 14.7% Asian (7.90% Indian, 1.74% Filipino, 1.61% Chinese, 1.34% Korean, 1.22% Vietnamese, 1.09% Pakistani)
- 7.3% African American
- 0.3% Native American
- 0.1% Pacific Islander
- 4.9% of some other race
- 4.0% of two or more races
- 12.4% of the population were Hispanic or Latino of any race (3.4% Salvadoran, 1.8% Mexican, 1.3% Peruvian, 0.9% Puerto Rican, 0.6% Honduran, 0.6% Bolivian, 0.5% Guatemalan, 0.5% Colombian)

According to the 2010 census, 10.5% of residents reported being of German ancestry, while 9.1% reported Irish, 7.7% English, 5.4% Italian and 5.2% American ancestry.

The most spoken languages other than English in Loudoun County in 2018 were Spanish, spoken by 10.8% of the population, and Telugu, spoken by 2.8% of the population. Almost 25% of Loudoun County residents were born outside of the United States, with the largest number of foreign-born residents being from El Salvador, India, and Mexico.

As of 2000, there were 59,900 households, out of which 43.10% had children under the age of 18 living with them, 64.30% were married couples living together, 7.80% had a female householder with no husband present, and 24.80% were non-families. 18.40% of all households were made up of individuals, and 3.70% had someone living alone who was 65 years of age or older. The average household size was 2.82, and the average family size was 3.24.

In the county, 29.80% of the population was under the age of 18, 5.70% was from 18 to 24, 38.90% from 25 to 44, 20.00% from 45 to 64, and 5.60% was 65 years of age or older. The median age was 34 years. For every 100 females, there were 97.80 males. For every 100 females age 18 and over, there were 95.50 males.

In 2011, census survey data concluded that Loudoun County had the highest median income in the country at $119,134.

From 1980 to 2014, deaths from cancer in Loudoun County decreased by 46 percent, the largest such decrease of any county in the United States.

From 2017 to 2018, Loudoun County saw an increase of 18.5% of households experiencing homelessness, a 21% increase for single adults, and a 36% increase for families. Homelessness for veterans in the county decreased by 16% from 2017 to 2018.

== Economy ==
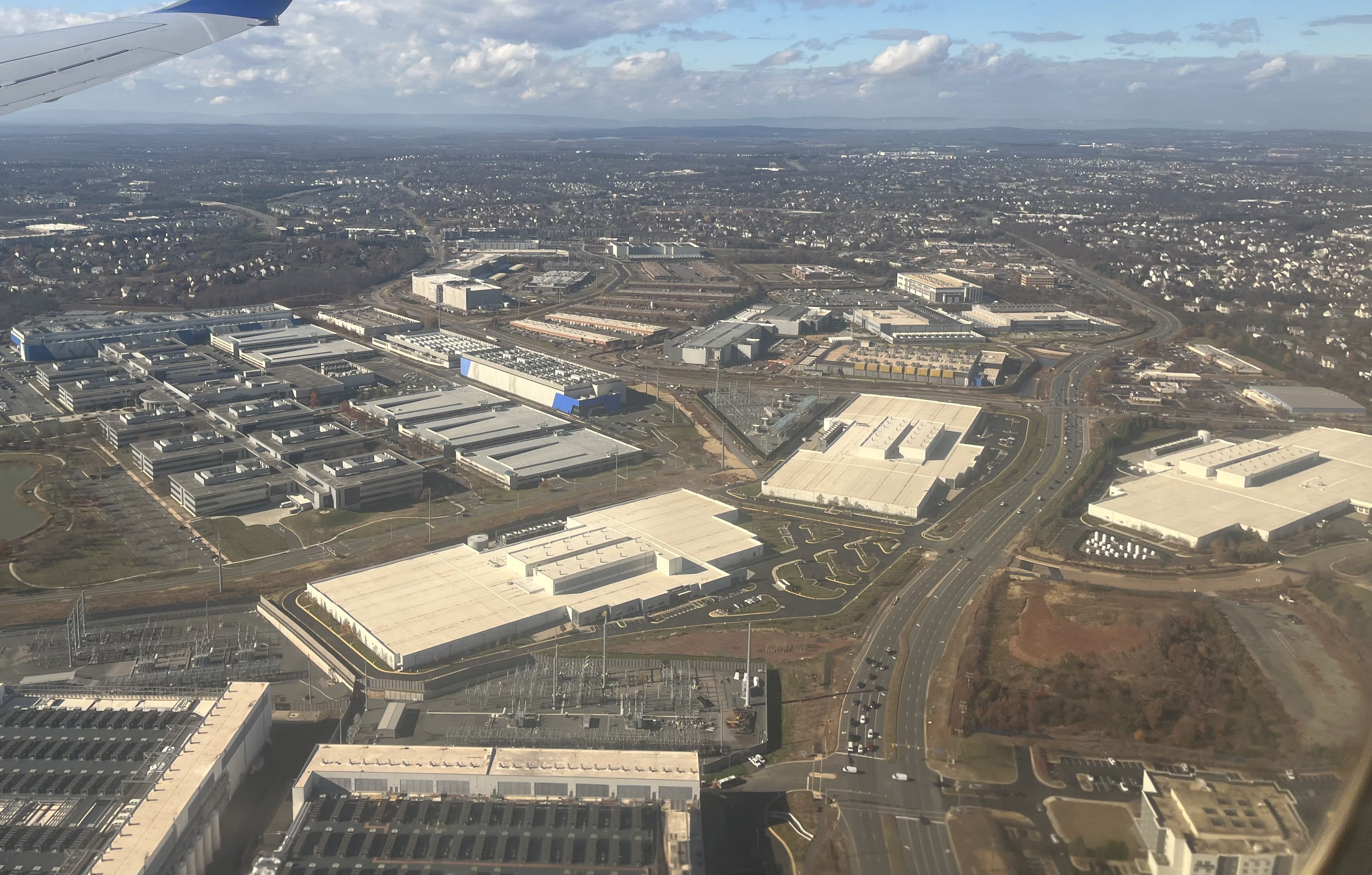
An aerial view of Loudoun County south of Ashburn. Several large data centers are visible in the foreground of this photograph.

Traditionally a rural county, Loudoun's population has grown dramatically since the 1980s. Having undergone heavy suburbanization since 1990, Loudoun has a full-fledged service economy. It is home to world headquarters for several Internet-related and high tech companies, including Verizon Business, Telos Corporation, and Orbital Sciences Corporation. Like Fairfax County's Dulles Corridor, Loudoun County has economically benefited from Dulles International Airport, the majority of which is in the county along its border with Fairfax.

Loudoun County retains a strong rural economy. The equine industry has an estimated revenue of $78 million. It is home to the Morven Park International Equestrian Center which hosts national horse trials. In addition, a growing wine industry has produced several internationally recognized wines. Loudoun County now has 40 wineries and over 25 active farms. Loudoun has rich soil and was in the mid-19th century a top wheat-producing county in the fourth largest wheat-producing state.

MCI, Inc. (formerly WorldCom), a subsidiary of Verizon Communications, is headquartered in Ashburn, Loudoun County. It announced it would move its headquarters to Ashburn in 2003. AOL had its headquarters at 22000 AOL Way in Dulles in unincorporated Loudoun County. In 2007 AOL announced it would move its headquarters from Loudoun County to New York City; it would continue to operate its Virginia offices. Orbital Sciences Corporation has its headquarters in Dulles.

Loudoun County houses over 60 massive data centers, many of which correspond to Amazon Web Services's us-east-1 region. It has been claimed that these data centers carry 70 percent of daily global web traffic, although this figure has been disputed with a more conservative estimate of 22 percent. Loudoun County's "Data Center Alley" is the world's largest concentration of data centers with over 25 million square feet of data centers.

Before its dissolution, Independence Air (originally Atlantic Coast Airlines) was headquartered in Dulles. At one time Atlantic Coast Airlines had its headquarters in Sterling. Before its dissolution, MAXjet Airways was headquartered on the grounds of Dulles International Airport.

=== Top employers ===
According to the county's annual comprehensive financial reports, the top employers in the county are:

#	Employer	# of employees (2024)	Percentage of Total County Employment
1	Loudoun County Public Schools	12,968	6.79
2	County of Loudoun	4,813	2.48
3	U.S. Department of Homeland Security	2,500-5,000	1.99
4	Inova Health System (Loudoun Hospital Center)	2,500-5,000	1.99
5	United Airlines	2,500-5,000	1.99
6	Amazon	1,000-2,500	0.93
7	Northrop Grumman (formerly Orbital ATK)	1,000-2,500	0.93
8	Verizon Business (formerly MCI Worldcom)	1,000-2,500	0.93
9	RTX (formerly Raytheon Technologies)	1,000-2,500	0.93
10	Walmart	1,000-2,500	0.93

== Government and politics ==
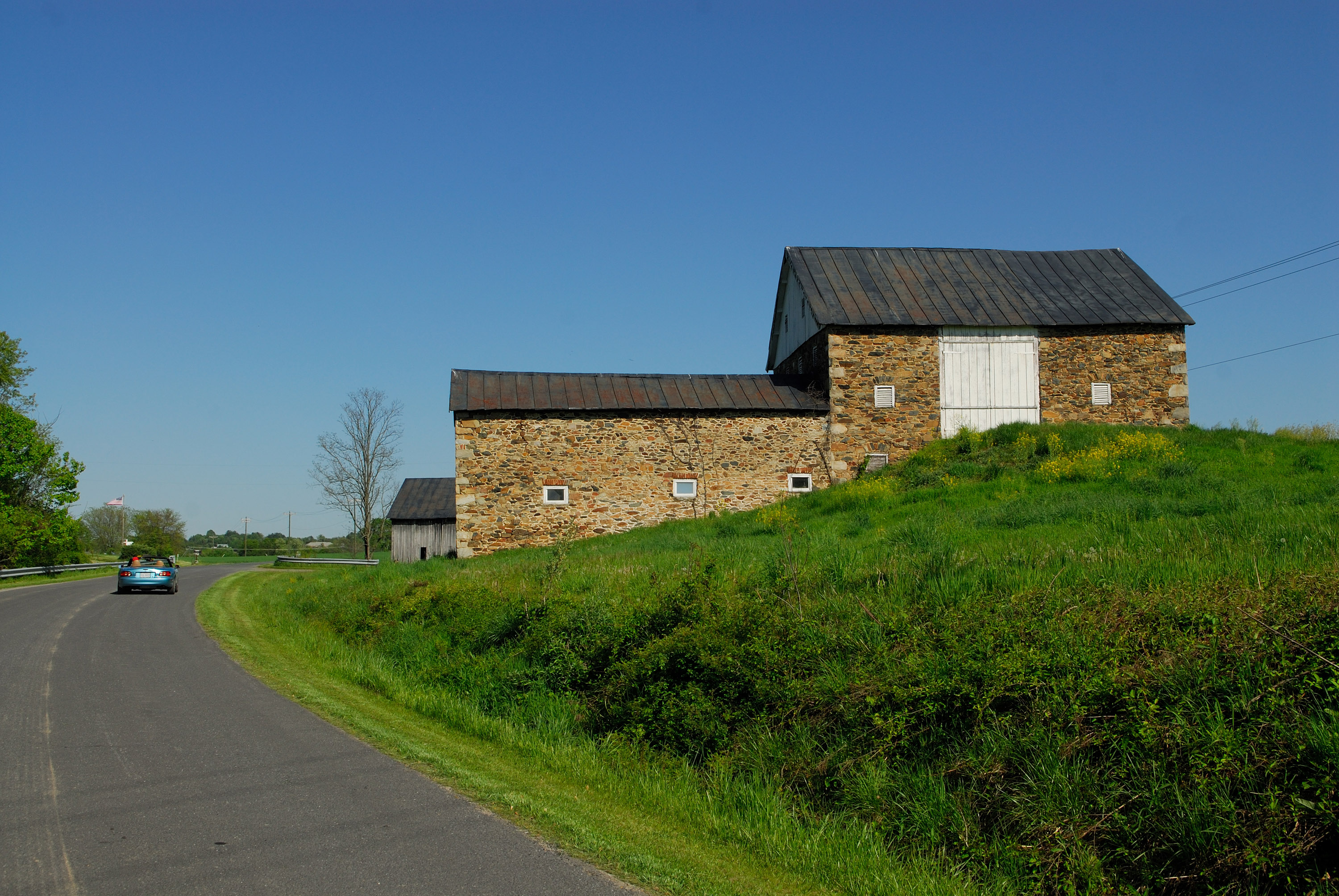
Many Loudoun County historical structures pre-date the American Civil War

Between 1952 and 2008, Loudoun was a Republican-leaning county.

However, this has changed in recent years with Democrats winning Loudoun in all statewide campaigns after Republicans narrowly carried it in 2014. As of the 2025 elections, Democrats hold a seven to two majority on the Board of Supervisors and a five to four majority on the School Board, but Republicans hold all five countywide elected constitutional offices (Clerk of the Circuit Court, Commissioner of the Revenue, Commonwealth's Attorney, Sheriff, and Treasurer). This makes Loudoun County a reliable state bellwether, having voted for every statewide presidential election winner since 1932.

The county's official motto, I Byde My Time, is borrowed from the coat of arms of the Earl of Loudoun. In the mid to late 20th century, as northerners gradually migrated to Southern suburbs, Loudoun County increasingly shifted to the Republican Party in supporting presidential candidates, and more local ones. Before the 2008 election of Barack Obama, county voters had not supported a Democratic president since Lyndon B. Johnson in 1964.

In recent years, the county's rapid suburban growth in its eastern portion, settled by educated professionals working in or near Washington, D.C., has changed the demographics of the county, and the Democratic Party has become increasingly competitive. After giving Senator Barack Obama nearly 54% of its presidential vote in 2008, the county supported Republican Bob McDonnell in 2009, who received 61% of the gubernatorial vote. Voters also replaced two incumbent Democratic delegates, making Loudoun's state House delegation all Republican. In 2012 county voters again supported Obama, who took 51.5% of the vote, with Republican challenger Mitt Romney garnering 47%. Democrats have won the county in every presidential election since 2008.

In 2020, Joe Biden won 61.5% of the county's vote, the best result for a Democratic candidate in Loudoun since 1964. A year later, in the 2021 Virginia gubernatorial election, Democratic nominee and former Governor Terry McAuliffe won the county with 55.3% to Glenn Youngkin's 44.2%. Loudoun was one of ten counties that was won by McAuliffe, though it was his smallest margin of victory in Northern Virginia. In 2024, Kamala Harris won 56% to Donald Trump's 40%, with the county shifting right by 9 percentage points from 2020 to 2024.

United States presidential election results for Loudoun County, Virginia
Year	Republican		Democratic		Third party(ies)	
Year	No.	%	No.	%	No.	%
1880	1,792	39.20%	2,780	60.80%	0	0.00%
1884	1,978	41.22%	2,795	58.24%	26	0.54%
1888	2,190	43.03%	2,842	55.83%	58	1.14%
1892	1,738	37.32%	2,719	58.39%	200	4.29%
1896	1,991	41.16%	2,741	56.67%	105	2.17%
1900	1,684	37.43%	2,690	59.79%	125	2.78%
1904	442	21.33%	1,558	75.19%	72	3.47%
1908	447	21.37%	1,570	75.05%	75	3.59%
1912	256	14.48%	1,386	78.39%	126	7.13%
1916	404	21.02%	1,490	77.52%	28	1.46%
1920	757	30.21%	1,720	68.64%	29	1.16%
1924	152	7.48%	1,794	88.33%	85	4.19%
1928	1,325	40.84%	1,915	59.03%	4	0.12%
1932	600	19.54%	2,440	79.45%	31	1.01%
1936	867	27.42%	2,287	72.33%	8	0.25%
1940	1,061	32.84%	2,156	66.73%	14	0.43%
1944	1,485	45.08%	1,802	54.71%	7	0.21%
1948	1,430	44.07%	1,545	47.61%	270	8.32%
1952	2,540	54.86%	2,075	44.82%	15	0.32%
1956	2,489	53.41%	1,960	42.06%	211	4.53%
1960	2,526	50.99%	2,399	48.43%	29	0.59%
1964	2,594	37.72%	4,278	62.21%	5	0.07%
1968	4,577	45.91%	3,262	32.72%	2,131	21.37%
1972	9,417	69.46%	3,941	29.07%	199	1.47%
1976	9,192	51.79%	7,995	45.05%	561	3.16%
1980	12,076	58.93%	6,694	32.67%	1,722	8.40%
1984	17,765	67.99%	8,227	31.49%	136	0.52%
1988	20,448	66.26%	10,101	32.73%	313	1.01%
1992	19,290	46.40%	14,462	34.79%	7,822	18.81%
1996	25,715	52.13%	19,942	40.43%	3,673	7.45%
2000	42,453	56.12%	30,938	40.89%	2,262	2.99%
2004	60,382	55.69%	47,271	43.60%	777	0.72%
2008	63,336	45.42%	74,845	53.67%	1,278	0.92%
2012	75,292	47.04%	82,479	51.53%	2,289	1.43%
2016	69,949	38.20%	100,795	55.05%	12,353	6.75%
2020	82,088	36.51%	138,372	61.54%	4,402	1.96%
2024	92,107	40.10%	129,280	56.28%	8,305	3.62%

=== County Board of Supervisors ===
Like many counties in Virginia, Loudoun is locally governed by a board of supervisors, the Loudoun County Board of Supervisors. The chairman of the board is elected by county voters at-large while the remaining supervisors are elected from eight single-member districts roughly equal in population. All nine members serve concurrent terms of four years. The board handles policy and land use issues and sets the budget; it appoints a county administrator to handle the county government's day-to-day operations. As of the 2023 elections, the chairman of the board and six district supervisors are Democrats; the remaining two supervisors are Republicans.

The Board's current Chair, Phyllis Randall, became the first person of color in Virginia's history to be an elected chair of a county board when she was elected Chair-at-Large in 2015.

In November 2019, Democrats took over the Board of Supervisors. Voters elected Juli E. Briskman (D) in Algonkian District, with 6,763 votes (54.09%) replacing incumbent Suzanne M. Volpe (R) who polled 5,719 votes (45.74%). Juli Briskman had been fired from her job as a marketing analyst for a United States government and military subcontractor, after an AFP photo of her flipping off the motorcade of Donald Trump went viral on social media in 2017.

Loudoun County Board of Supervisors (January 1, 2024, to December 31, 2027) (Elected on November 7, 2023)
Position	Name	Party	First Elected	District
Chair	Phyllis Randall	Democratic	2015	At-Large
Vice Chair	Mike Turner	Democratic	2019	Ashburn
Supervisor	Juli Briskman	Democratic	2019	Algonkian
Supervisor	Sylvia Glass	Democratic	2019	Broad Run
Supervisor	Caleb Kershner	Republican	2019	Catoctin
Supervisor	Matt Letourneau	Republican	2011	Dulles
Supervisor	Kristen Umstattd	Democratic	2015	Leesburg
Supervisor	Laura TeKrony	Democratic	2023	Little River
Supervisor	Koran Saines	Democratic	2015	Sterling

Constitutional Officers (January 1, 2024, to December 31, 2027) (Elected on November 7, 2023)
Position	Name	Party	First Election
Clerk of the Circuit Court	Gary M. Clemens	Republican	1999
Commissioner of the Revenue	Robert S. Wertz Jr.	Republican	2003
Commonwealth's Attorney	Robert D. Anderson	Republican	2023
Sheriff	Michael L. Chapman	Republican	2011
Treasurer	Henry C. Eickelberg	Republican	2023

Loudoun County School Board (January 1, 2026, to December 31, 2027) (Elected on November 7, 2023 and November 4, 2025)
Position	Name	Party	First Elected	District
Chair	April Chandler	Nonpartisan	2023	Algonkian
Vice Chair	Anne Donohue	Nonpartisan	2023	At-Large
Member	Deana Griffiths	Nonpartisan	2023	Ashburn
Member	Ross Svenson	Nonpartisan	2025	Broad Run
Member	Kari LaBell	Nonpartisan	2023	Catoctin
Member	Jon Pepper	Nonpartisan	2025	Dulles
Member	Lauren Shernoff	Nonpartisan	2023	Leesburg
Member	Sumera Rashid	Nonpartisan	2023	Little River
Member	Amy Riccardi	Nonpartisan	2025	Sterling

Virginia General Assembly Senators (Elected on November 7, 2023)
Position	Name	Party	First Elected	District
Senator	Russet Perry	Democratic	2023	31
Senator	Kannan Srinivasan	Democratic	2025 (Special)	32

Virginia General Assembly Delegates (Elected on November 4, 2025)
Position	Name	Party	First Elected	District
Delegate	JJ Singh	Democratic	2025 (Special)	26
Delegate	Atoosa Reaser	Democratic	2023	27
Delegate	David Reid	Democratic	2017	28
Delegate	Marty Martinez	Democratic	2023	29
Delegate	John McAuliff	Democratic	2025	30

The National Transportation Safety Board operates the Ashburn Aviation Field Office in Ashburn, an unincorporated area of Loudoun County. The Federal Aviation Administration's Washington Air Route Traffic Control Center, the second-busiest facility of its kind in the nation, is located in Leesburg.

Emergency services are provided by the Loudoun County Combined Fire and Rescue System with the Office of Emergency Management. LC-CFRS is a combination system that utilizes some 500 volunteers and over 600 career firefighters, EMT/paramedics, dispatchers, and support staff. LCFR is one of the largest fire and rescue systems in Virginia.

Law enforcement in Loudoun County is provided by the Loudoun County Sheriff's Office, which is Virginia's largest sheriff's office, as well as three town police departments: Leesburg Police, Purcellville Police, and Middleburg Police. The county's highways are also patrolled by Virginia State Police troopers. Dulles Airport and the Dulles Toll Road are patrolled by the Metropolitan Washington Airports Authority Police Department.

The Loudoun County Public Library System has eleven branches in the county. The library's Outreach Department of the Loudoun County Public Library is a resource for those who cannot easily access branch services. The public library system has won several awards, including 10th place for libraries serving a comparably sized population in 2006.

Loudoun County is one of the counties in Virginia that elects to cover their employees in the Virginia Mortgage Assistance Program (VMAP). The program is designed to make housing more affordable for civil service workers in Virginia.

== Transportation ==
=== Airports ===
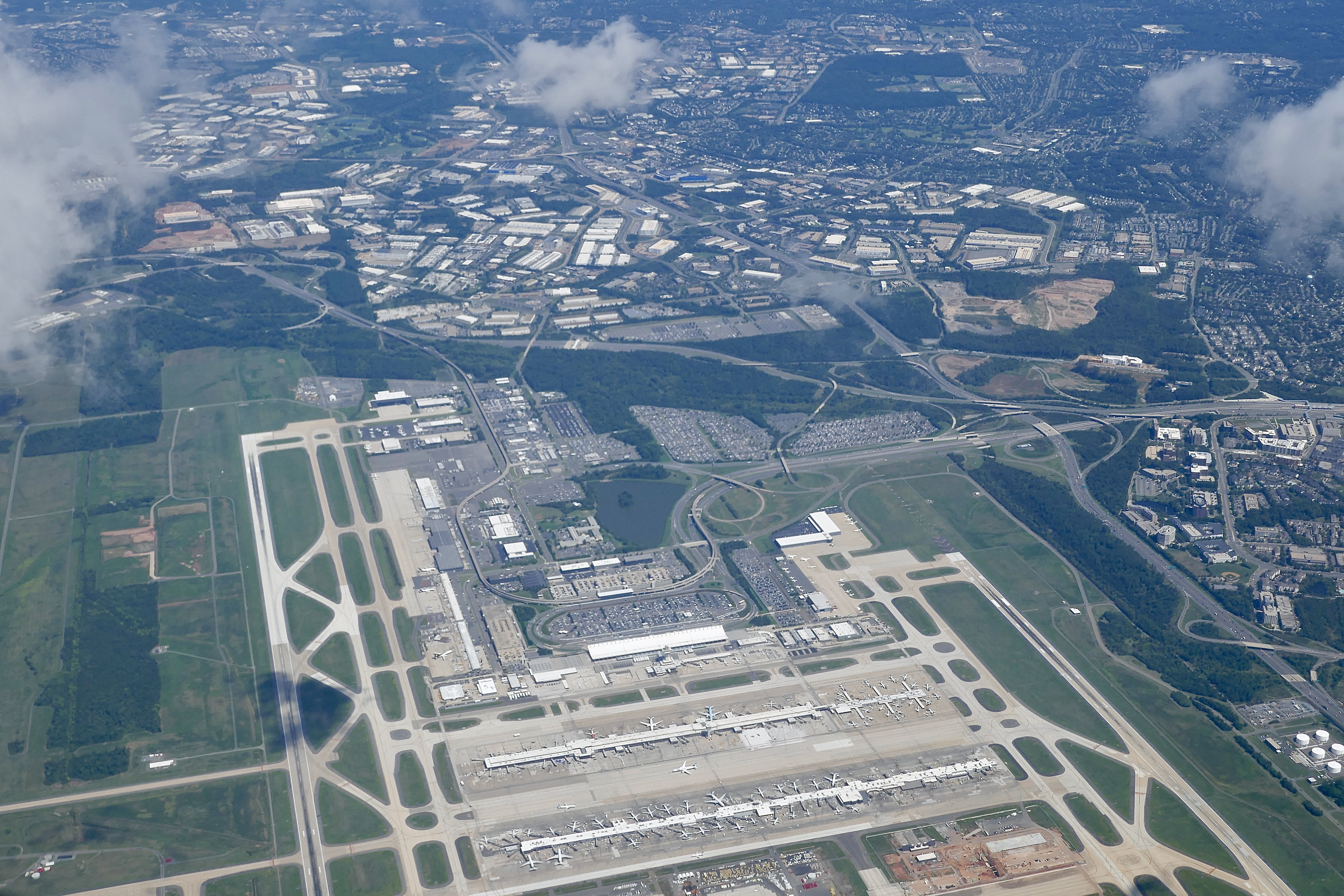
Aerial view of Dulles International Airport in Dulles in August 2024

Loudoun County has two airports: Dulles International and Leesburg Executive.

=== Bus ===
Loudoun County operates its own bus public transit system, known as Loudoun County Transit.

=== Rail ===
The Silver Line of the Washington Metro provides service at the Dulles Airport, Loudoun Gateway, and Ashburn stations.

=== Major highways ===
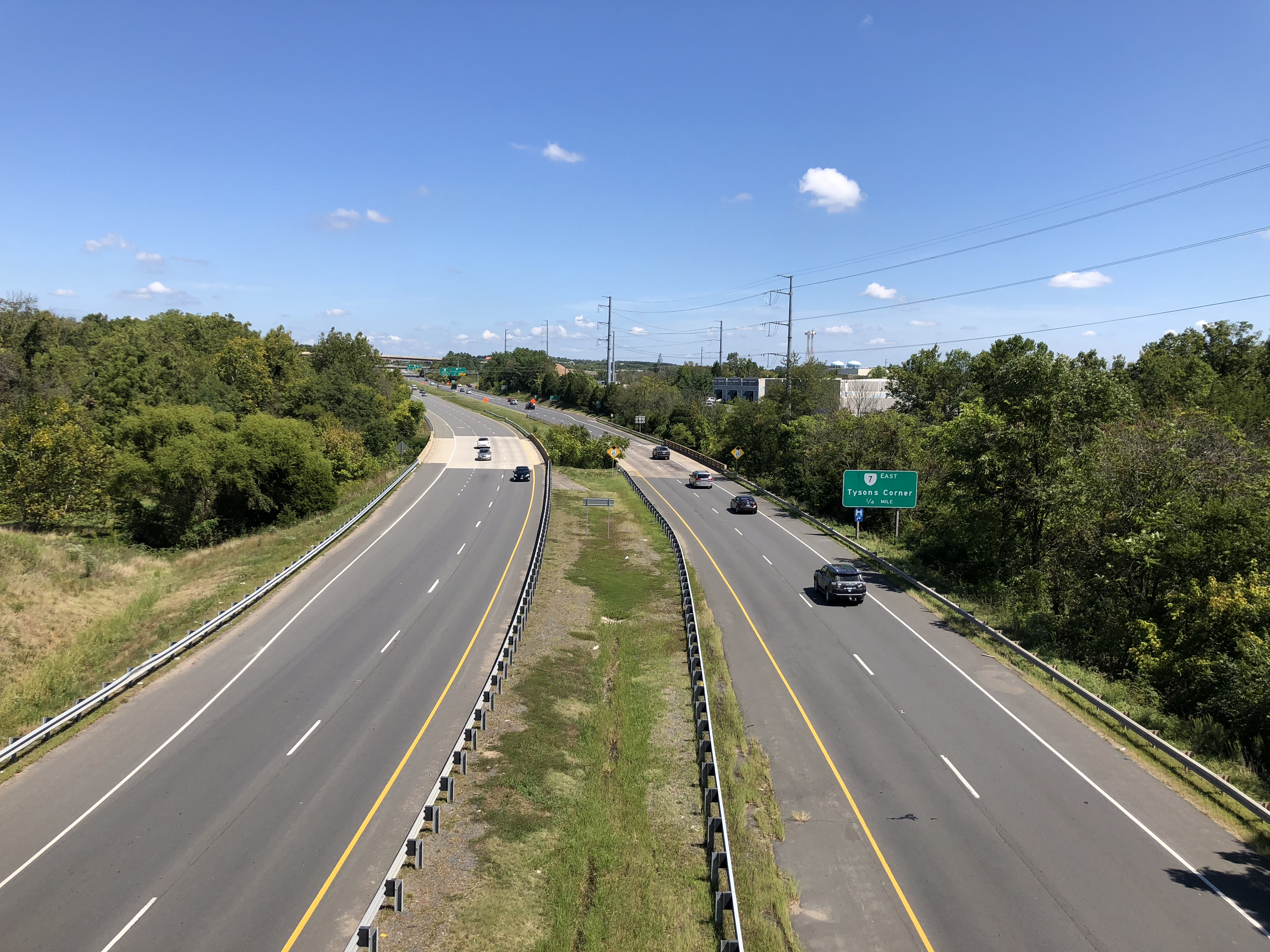
US 15 and VA State Route 7 on the Leesburg Bypass in September 2019

- U.S. Route 15 (James Monroe Highway)
- U.S. Route 50 (Little River Turnpike)
- U.S. Route 340
- State Route 7 (Leesburg Pike)
- State Route 9 (Charles Town Pike)
- State Route 28
- State Route 267 (Dulles Greenway)
- Loudoun County Parkway
- Braddock Road (Northern Virginia)

== Education ==
The county is served by Loudoun County Public Schools (LCPS). LCPS serves over 70,000 students from kindergarten through 12th grade and is Virginia's fifth largest school system. Loudoun County schools recently ranked 11th in the United States in terms of educational achievement versus funds spent. Loudoun County also sends students to its Loudoun Academy of Science, formerly housed within Dominion High School now within the Academies of Loudoun, and is eligible to send students to Thomas Jefferson High School for Science and Technology, a STEM magnet school in Alexandria, Virginia.

Loudoun County is home to ten private schools: Loudoun Country Day School, a Pre-K–8 independent school in Leesburg; Notre Dame Academy, an independent non-denominational day high school in Middleburg; Evergreen Christian School, a private high school near Leesburg; the Foxcroft School, a boarding school for girls located in Middleburg; Dominion Academy, a Non-denominational Christian school, K–8 in Leesburg; Loudoun Classical School, a Protestant classical 7th-12th grade school in Purcellville; St. Theresa School, a K–8 Roman Catholic school in Ashburn; Village Montessori School at Bluemont, an accredited Pre-K through Elementary Montessori school in Bluemont; Christian Faith & Fellowship School, a PreK–12 non-denominational Christian school and Loudoun County's only private school accredited by the Association of Christian Schools International; and Loudoun School for Advanced Studies (formerly the Ideal Schools High School,) an independent non-denominational school in Ashburn.

In terms of post-secondary education, Loudoun County is home to a variety of colleges and universities, including: Patrick Henry College, a private Christian college; Northern Virginia Community College in Sterling (branch campus); George Washington University (satellite campus); George Mason University (satellite campus); Marymount University (satellite campus); Shenandoah University (satellite campus); and Strayer University (satellite campus). Loudoun is also home to a satellite campus of the Virginia–Maryland College of Veterinary Medicine and the Janelia Farm Research Campus of the Howard Hughes Medical Institute.

== Communities ==
=== Towns ===
- Hamilton
- Hillsboro
- Leesburg (county seat)
- Lovettsville
- Middleburg
- Purcellville
- Round Hill

=== Census-designated places ===
- Aldie
- Arcola
- Ashburn
- Belmont
- Brambleton
- Broadlands
- Cascades
- Countryside
- Dulles Town Center
- Goose Creek Village
- Kincora
- Lansdowne
- Loudoun Valley Estates
- Lowes Island
- Moorefield
- Oak Grove
- One Loudoun
- South Riding
- Sterling
- Stone Ridge
- Sugarland Run
- University Center
- Waterford

=== Other unincorporated communities ===
- Airmont
- Bloomfield
- Bluemont
- Britain
- Conklin
- Dover
- Dulles
- Elvan
- Eubanks
- Georges Mill
- Gilberts Corner
- Gleedsville
- Howardsville
- Leithtown
- Lenah
- Lincoln
- Loudoun Heights
- Lucketts
- Morrisonville
- Mount Gilead
- Neersville
- Paeonian Springs
- Paxson
- Philomont
- Potomac Falls
- River Creek
- Ryan
- Saint Louis
- Scattersville
- Silcott Spring
- Stewartown
- Stumptown
- Taylorstown
- Telegraph Spring
- Unison
- Watson
- Waxpool
- Wheatland
- Willard
- Willisville
- Woodburn

=== Population ranking ===
The population ranking of the following table is based on 2018 estimates by the United States Census Bureau.

† county seat

Rank	City/Town/etc.	Municipal type	Population (2018 est.)
1	† Leesburg	Town	52,125
2	Ashburn	CDP	50,290
3	South Riding	CDP	31,071
4	Sterling	CDP	30,403
5	Brambleton	CDP	20,081
6	Broadlands	CDP	13,704
7	Stone Ridge	CDP	12,990
8	Lansdowne	CDP	12,696
9	Sugarland Run	CDP	12,576
10	Cascades	CDP	11,670
11	Lowes Island	CDP	11,111
12	Countryside	CDP	10,042
13	Purcellville	Town	9,709
14	Belmont	CDP	6,629
15	Dulles Town Center	CDP	5,023
16	University Center	CDP	4,060
16	Lovettsville	Town	2,544
17	Oak Grove	CDP	2,468
18	Moorefield Station	CDP	1,369
19	Arcola	CDP	963
20	Round Hill	Town	693
21	Middleburg	Town	620
22	Hamilton	Town	537
23	Hillsboro	Town	175

== Notable people ==
James Monroe constructed and resided at Oak Hill near Aldie after his presidency. American Civil War Brigadier General Robert H. Chilton (Chief of Staff under Robert E. Lee) was a native of Loudoun County. World War II general George C. Marshall resided at Dodona Manor in Leesburg. Essayist and journalist Russell Baker grew up in Morrisonville, Virginia and his book Growing Up highlights his childhood in rural Virginia. Entertainer Arthur Godfrey lived near historic Waterford, Virginia. Loudoun County is also the birthplace of Julia Neale Jackson, mother of Stonewall Jackson, and Susan Catherine Koerner Wright, mother of the Wright Brothers.

- Madeleine Albright (1937–2022) – U.S. Secretary of State in Clinton Administration
- William H. Ash (1859–1908) – Former slave who was one of the first African-American politicians to be elected to the Virginia House of Delegates
- Russell Baker (1925–2019) – Pulitzer Prize-winning author of Growing Up (1983, Autobiography)
- Geraldine Brooks (1955–) – Pulitzer Prize–winning author
- John Champe – Revolutionary War soldier and double agent
- Roger Preston Chew (1843–1921) – Horse artillery commander in the Confederate Army of Northern Virginia, prominent West Virginia businessman, railroad executive and West Virginia legislator
- John L. Dagg (1794–1884) – Baptist theologian, pastor, educator, and president of Mercer University, GA (1844–54)
- Westmoreland Davis (1859–1942) – Governor of Virginia
- Richard Henry Dulany (1820–1906) – Colonel of the 7th Virginia Cavalry during the Civil War
- Michael Farris (1951–) – Founder of the Home School Legal Defense Association and Patrick Henry College in Purcellville; unsuccessful Republican nominee for lieutenant governor of Virginia in 1993
- Joe Gibbs (1940–) – Lived just west of Leesburg while coaching the Washington Redskins
- Arthur Godfrey (1903–1983) – Popular national radio and television personality
- Darrell Green (1960–) – Former Washington Redskin and inductee to the NFL Pro Football Hall of Fame
- Pamela Harriman (1920–1997) – Daughter-in-law of Sir Winston Churchill and U.S. ambassador to France
- Gina Haspel (1956–) – Director of the CIA, first female ever appointed to the position
- Annia Hatch (1978–) – Cuban American 2x Olympic silver medalist in gymnastics, currently lives in Ashburn
- Fred Hetzel (1942–) – Former professional basketball player
- Barbara Holland (1933–2010) – author
- Tony Horwitz (1958–2019) – Pulitzer Prize–winning author
- John Janney (1798–1872) – Member of the Virginia General Assembly and officer of the Virginia Secession Convention of 1861
- Sheila Johnson (1949–) – Entertainment and sports entrepreneur and philanthropist.
- Wilton Lackaye (1862-1932) – American stage and film actor, the original Broadway stage Svengali, 1895
- Lyndon LaRouche (1921–2019) – Controversial American politician, activist, and founder of the LaRouche movement
- Marc Leepson (1945–) – Journalist, historian, author
- Sandra Lerner (c. 1953–) – Entrepreneur and philanthropist
- Mark Levin (1957–) – Author and conservative talk radio host
- George C. Marshall (1880–1959) – General of the Army (5-star), U.S. Secretary of State, Secretary of Defense, and author of the "Marshall Plan"
- Stevens T. Mason (1811–1843) – First governor of Michigan (Democrat, 1837–40)
- Andrew McCabe (1968–) – Former Deputy Director of the FBI
- Charles F. Mercer (1788–1858) – Founded village of Aldie; U.S. Congressman from Virginia
- Billy Mitchell (1879–1936) – Controversial Army officer and military aviation pioneer
- James Monroe (1758–1831) – 5th President of the United States
- Oliver North (1943–) – Former USMC Officer and figure in the Iran–Contra scandal; commentator and host on the Fox network
- Patton Oswalt (1969–) – American stand-up comedian, writer and actor
- Vinton Liddell Pickens (1900–1993) – artist, chair of the first Loudoun County planning commission in 1941
- Wilson Pickett (1941–2006) – R&B and soul singer and songwriter
- Isaiah L. Potts (1784?–after 1843) – tavern keeper of the notorious Potts Tavern who, allegedly, ran a gang of highwaymen and murderers on the Illinois frontier
- Rachel Renee Russell (1959–) – #1 New York Times best-selling author of the children's book series, Dork Diaries
- Henry S. Taylor (1942–) – Pulitzer Prize-winning poet
- Will Toledo (1992–) – lead singer of Car Seat Headrest, musician, songwriter
- Joshua White (1812–1890) – businessman and Illinois state legislator
- Lucien Whiting Powell (1846–1930) – Renowned landscape artist
- William Wilson (1794–1857) – Chief Justice of the Supreme Court of Illinois

== Sister cities ==
Loudoun County has eight Sister City/County relationships, and one Friendship City Partnership. Most are also suburbs of their respective capitals.

- Canelones, Uruguay (2023)
- Gangneung, South Korea (Friendship City, 2014)
- Goyang, South Korea (2012)
- Greater Noida, India (2023)
- Holmes County, Mississippi (2019)
- Karsiyaka, Turkey (2013)
- Main-Taunus-Kreis, Germany (2006)
- New Taipei City, Taiwan (2012)
- Tema, Ghana (2023)

== See also ==
- Loudoun Water
- Loudoun v. Board of Trustees of the Loudoun County Library
- National Register of Historic Places listings in Loudoun County, Virginia
- List of wineries in Virginia
- Loudoun Symphony Orchestra
