= Lucien Whiting Powell =

American landscape artist (1848–1930)

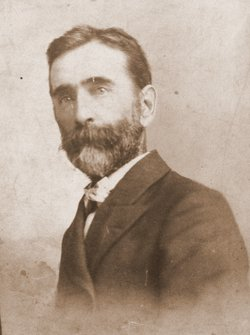
- Born: December 13, 1846 near Upperville, Virginia, US
- Died: September 27, 1930 (aged 83); Maryland, US
- Resting place: Congressional Cemetery, Washington, DC
- Known for: Landscape art, Painting

Lucien Whiting Powell (1846–1930) was a renowned landscape painter who gave the village of Airmont, Virginia its name for its scenic westward views. Powell, himself, could be considered a native of Airmont, having been born a few miles southeast, near Upperville, Virginia.

== Career ==
Powell served with the Confederate Army, 1863–65 and studied with Thomas Moran at the Pennsylvania Academy of the Fine Arts. He travelled to Europe in 1876 and studied with Fitz at the West London School of Art, and studied closely the works of Joseph Mallord William Turner. He also studied Thomas Cole's works.

Powell married Nan Fitzhugh in 1880 and lived in Washington, D.C. from 1885 until his death in 1930 of double pneumonia. He maintained a studio residence at 1923 G Street Northeast until his death. Landscapes dominated the career of Lucien Powell. Powell enjoyed popularity in the Washington, D.C., art community and was a member of several local art organizations including the Landscape Club, the Society of Washington Artists, and the Washington Watercolor Club. His paintings were widely collected and exhibited at local and national art exhibitions as well as being lauded in the regional press. Early exhibitions of Powell's works included the Louisville Industrial Exhibition in the 1870s.

Mr. Powell was the first artist to hold an exhibition on an ocean liner in 1891.

He accompanied a geological survey party to the Grand Canyon of the Yellowstone in 1901 and visited the Holy Land, Egypt, and Italy in 1910.

Powell was patronized by Senator and Mrs. John B. Henderson, who established a studio for him in their "Castle." Mrs. Henderson grew very fond of Mr. Powell's artistic talent and came to own over seventy of his paintings. A few years after her death, Adam Weschler & Son held her estate auction. This auction, held in 1935, is believed to be the largest known sale of Mr. Powell's works. J. Edgar Hoover also owned more than a dozen of Powell's works.

Some of Lucien Powell's favorite scenes to paint were: Venice, Rock Creek Park in Washington DC, Grand Canyon, scenes from the Holy Land and Egypt and scenes around Northern Virginia.

He died on 27 September 1930 at the Washington Sanitarium in Takoma Park, Maryland and was buried at the Congressional Cemetery in Washington, DC.
