= Howardsville, Loudoun County, Virginia =

Unincorporated community in Virginia, United States

Howardsville, Virginia
- Unincorporated community
- Location within Northern Virginia Location within Virginia Location within the United States
- Coordinates: 39°2′16″N 77°50′19″W
- Country: United States
- State: Virginia
- County: Loudoun
- Time zone: UTC−5 (Eastern (EST))
  - Summer (DST): UTC−4 (EDT)

Howardsville is an unincorporated community in southwestern Loudoun County, Virginia, United States. It is located at 39°2′16″N 77°50′19″W.

== History ==
In 1874, nine years after the end of slavery, Jacob Howard and Andrew Causeberry purchased four acres of land in western Loudoun County on present-day Route 719 (Greengarden Road), not far from Upperville. The parcel was part of the plantation of Jacob’s former enslavers, William and Mary Stephenson. Others followed and the community of Howardsville was established. Jacob and his wife Sophia built a home, raised a family, and made a new life in freedom. Their descendants still own properties there. Howardsville remains one of the few intact African American communities in Loudoun that were formed after the Civil War.
