= Thomas Balch =

Thomas Balch may refer to:

- Thomas Balch (historian) (1821–1877), American historian
- Thomas Balch (minister) (1712–1774), colonial American minister
- Thomas Bloomer Balch (1793–1878), Presbyterian pastor
