= Loudoun County Public Library =

- Location: Loudoun County, Virginia, U.S.
- Established: 1973
- Branches: 10

Other information
- Director: Chang Liu
- Website: Loudoun County Public Library

Loudoun County Public Library (LCPL), with more than 200 employees, both professional and paraprofessional, serves the citizens of Loudoun County, Virginia. There are 10 physical branches, plus Outreach Services, which delivers books and other resources to the disabled, elderly and homebound.

In 2019, LCPL became the third public library system in Virginia to eliminate fines for overdue materials. While customers are no longer charged a fee for overdue items, they are still responsible for replacement costs for lost materials.

The system was named an honorable mention for Library of the Year by Library Journal in 2021.

== Branches ==
The 10 branches range in size from large regional libraries to small neighborhood branches. Outreach Services is the traveling branch of the Loudoun County Public Library, although its offices and collection are located inside Rust Library in Leesburg.

Each branch has an advisory board that helps support the library and raise funds. Another source of funding is the annual book sale put on by the Loudoun Library Foundation.

The 10 LCPL branches are:

- Ashburn
- Brambleton
- Cascades (Potomac Falls)
- Gum Spring (Stone Ridge)
- Thomas Balch Library
- Lovettsville
- Middleburg
- Purcellville
- Rust (Leesburg)
- Sterling
- Outreach Services

In 1974, the Thomas Balch Library in Leesburg joined the Loundoun County Public Library system. In 1994, its ownership was transferred to the Town of Leesburg to operate as a historical and genealogical library.

== Administration ==
The administration building for the Loudoun County Public Library system is located in Leesburg, Virginia. The building is combined with The Senior Center of Leesburg. The current director of the Loudoun County Public Library system is Chang Liu.

== History ==
The Loudoun County Public Library system was established in 1973. In the beginning, the only libraries in the system were the Purcellville branch, the Purcellville bookmobile and the Sterling branch. The next year, the Thomas Balch Library, located in Leesburg, Virginia, would join the system. Other branches would join over the years, the most recent of which is the Brambleton Library, which opened Dec. 1, 2018. The Thomas Balch Library would later leave the system, after being transferred to the city of Leesburg, Virginia in 1994 to serve as a dedicated history and genealogy library.

== Special collections ==
In 1999, philanthropist Irwin Uran donated $1 million to the library for the purpose of acquiring items focusing on the Holocaust. LCPL also used the Irwin Uran Fund for its 1community program, an annual countywide initiative that promotes community dialogue and understanding through the shared experience of reading and discussing the same book.

LCPL offers a variety of gadgets and equipment for patrons to borrow, including coding robots, WiFi hotspots, thermal imaging cameras, sewing machines, ukuleles and Virginia State Parks passes.

== Resources ==
LCPL library cards are free to all Loudoun County residents or anyone who attends school, works or owns property in Loudoun County. Residents of neighboring jurisdictions, including Fairfax County, may also be eligible through a reciprocal borrowing program. Library cards can be applied for online or at any LCPL branch.

Each branch offers free public Internet and wireless access.

The Loudoun County Public Library website allows patrons to use a variety of electronic resources, including eBooks, audiobooks, streaming movies and TV shows, streaming music, digital magazines and databases. Patrons can access such platforms as OverDrive, Hoopla, Freegal Music, Kanopy, Consumer Reports, LinkedIn Learning, Mango Languages and Westlaw.

Makerspaces are available for public use during regular library hours at the Brambleton, Gum Spring, Rust, and Sterling branches. Patrons can use technology like 3D printers, sewing and embroidery machines, laminator machines, coding equipment, digitization equipment for converting VHS tapes and home movies, carving machines, and vinyl and paper cutters. Brambleton Library has a recording studio and Sterling Library has a smaller recording booth, with editing software available at both locations.

In 2018, a full-service Passport Acceptance Facility opened at Rust Library. Trained staff can take photos onsite, help with filling out forms and file paperwork with the U.S. State Department.

LCPL branches have meeting rooms that are available free of charge for public use as well as private study rooms.

Public notary services are also available by appointment at all LCPL branches free of charge.

== Events ==
Each branch offers storytimes for young children as well as a variety of programs for older kids and teens. The library conducts a summer reading program every year. Between the last day of school in June and the middle of August, hundreds of kids sign up to read and win prizes.

LCPL hosts numerous events for adults, covering topics such as career assistance, hobbies and crafts, technology, health and wellness, educational seminars, live performances, and literacy programs for English language learners.

The library system often partners with another county organization to offer programs.

All branches offer book clubs for children, teens and adults.

== Trustees and directors ==
The Loudoun County Board of Supervisors, the elected body governing Loudoun County, appoints trustees to oversee the library. The Library Board of Trustees has nine members, one member at-large and one from each district: Algonkian, Ashburn, Broad Run, Catoctin, Dulles, Leesburg, Little River, and Sterling. Each member is appointed to serve a term of four years, lasting from July 1 to June 30, and may serve up to two consecutive terms. While the Board of Supervisors members are partisan, the Board of Trustees members are not.

The general duties of the Library Board of Trustees are to fund the library, appoint a director, approve the budget, determine policies, receive gifts, and attend monthly board meetings. Additional duties of the board include being knowledgeable about the library and libraries in general, remaining impartial, being familiar with library standards, respecting colleagues, supporting library-related laws that improve libraries state- and nationwide, interacting with the public that the library serves, and encouraging private funding.

The library system is run by a director, along with a deputy director and five division managers. The library director is appointed by and reports to the Board of Trustees.
