= Lowes Island, Virginia =

- Census-designated place
- Location within Northern Virginia Location within Virginia Location within the United States
- Coordinates: 39°03′35″N 77°21′08″W
- Country: United States
- State: Virginia
- County: Loudoun

Area
  - Total: 3.16 sq mi (8.19 km^{2})
  - Land: 3.02 sq mi (7.81 km^{2})
  - Water: 0.14 sq mi (0.37 km^{2})
- Elevation: 300 ft (91 m)

Population (2010)
  - Total: 10,756
  - Density: 3,565/sq mi (1,376.4/km^{2})
- Time zone: UTC−5 (Eastern (EST))
  - Summer (DST): UTC−4 (EDT)
- ZIP code: 20165 (Sterling)
- FIPS code: 51-47296
- GNIS feature ID: 2584870

Lowes Island is a census-designated place (CDP) in Loudoun County, Virginia, United States. As of the 2020 census, Lowes Island had a population of 11,023. Along with nearby Countryside and Cascades, it is considered one of the three main components of the Potomac Falls community (ZIP code 20165).

The community takes its name from an island on the south shore of the Potomac River.

== Geography ==
Lowes Island is in the eastern corner of Loudoun County and is bordered to the east by Fairfax County, and to the north, across the Potomac, by Montgomery County, Maryland. Neighboring communities are Great Falls to the east, Sugarland Run to the south, Cascades to the west, and Darnestown, Maryland, to the northeast.

Lowes Island is 26 miles (42 km) northwest of downtown Washington, D.C., and 15 miles (24 km) east of Leesburg, the Loudoun county seat.

According to the U.S. Census Bureau, the Lowes Island CDP has a total area of 3.2 square miles (8.2 km^{2}), of which 3.0 square miles (7.8 km^{2}) are land and 0.2 square miles (0.4 km^{2}), or 4.56%, are water. Sugarland Run forms the western border of the CDP, flowing north to the Potomac River at the physical Lowes Island.

The community's name comes from an island on the south shore of the Potomac River, now home to the Trump National Golf Club Washington, D.C., owned by Donald Trump. The club was formerly the Lowes Island Club; Trump purchased it in 2009.

== Demographics ==
Historical population
Census	Pop.	Note	%±
2010	10,756		—
2020	11,023		2.5%
U.S. Decennial Census; 2010 2020

=== 2020 census ===
As of the 2020 census, Lowes Island had a population of 11,023. The median age was 41.0 years. 25.3% of residents were under the age of 18 and 11.2% of residents were 65 years of age or older. For every 100 females there were 95.5 males, and for every 100 females age 18 and over there were 93.8 males age 18 and over.

100.0% of residents lived in urban areas, while 0.0% lived in rural areas.

There were 3,648 households in Lowes Island, of which 42.7% had children under the age of 18 living in them. Of all households, 70.8% were married-couple households, 9.5% were households with a male householder and no spouse or partner present, and 16.6% were households with a female householder and no spouse or partner present. About 13.2% of all households were made up of individuals and 5.1% had someone living alone who was 65 years of age or older.

There were 3,701 housing units, of which 1.4% were vacant. The homeowner vacancy rate was 0.5% and the rental vacancy rate was 0.7%.

Racial composition as of the 2020 census
Race	Number	Percent
White	7,208	65.4%
Black or African American	487	4.4%
American Indian and Alaska Native	23	0.2%
Asian	1,833	16.6%
Native Hawaiian and Other Pacific Islander	4	0.0%
Some other race	270	2.4%
Two or more races	1,198	10.9%
Hispanic or Latino (of any race)	902	8.2%

=== 2010 census ===
Lowes Island was first listed as a census designated place in the 2010 U.S. census.
