= Thomas Balch Library =

Library in Virginia, United States

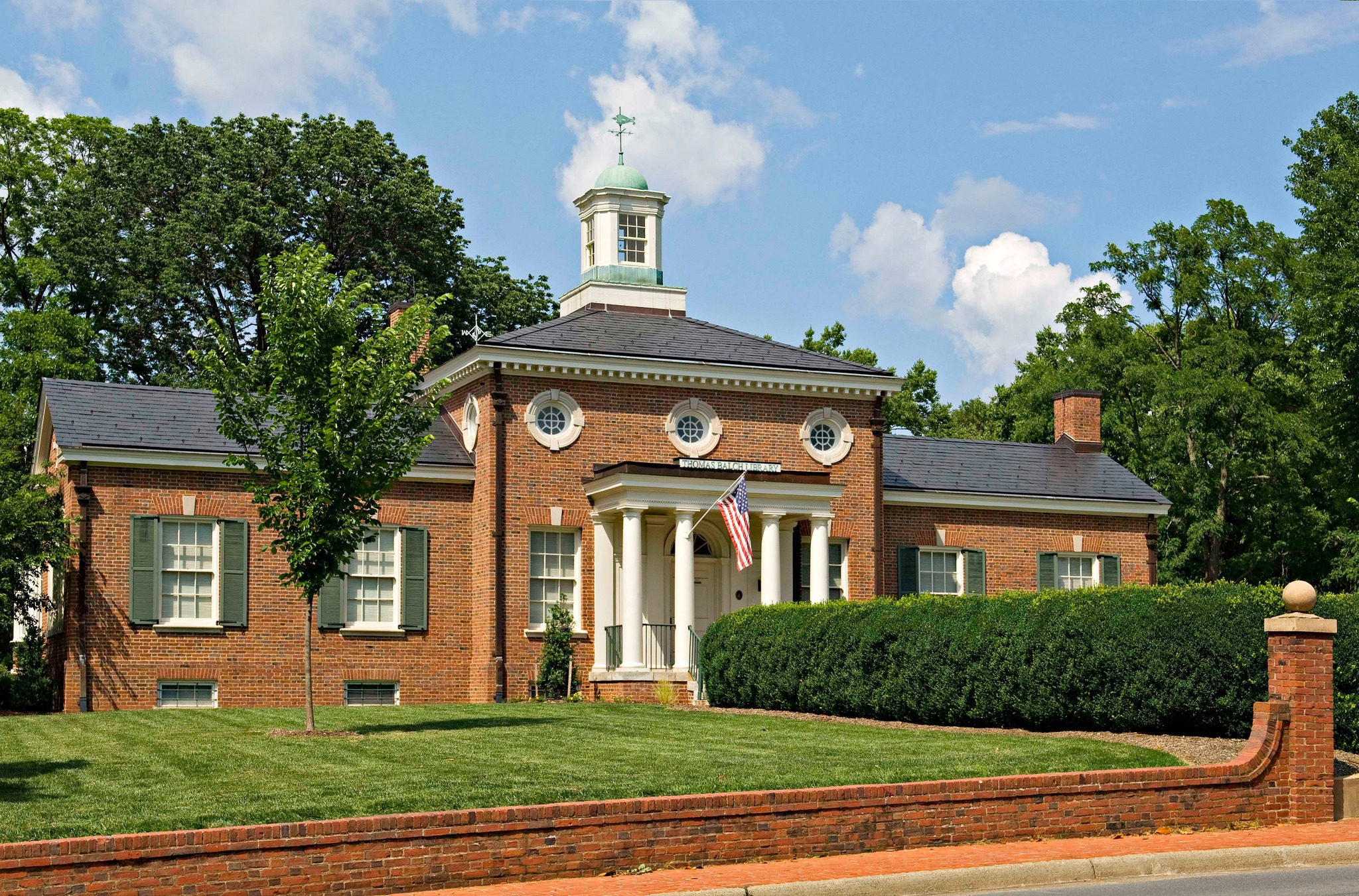
- Thomas Balch Library
- Interactive map of the Thomas Balch Library area

General information
- Location: 208 West Market Street, Leesburg, VA
- Coordinates: 39.1167726°N 77.5683237°W
- Opened: 1922
- Renovated: 2000

The Thomas Balch Library is a history and genealogy library located in Leesburg, Virginia. The library, owned and operated by the town of Leesburg, serves as a designated Underground Railroad research site and has an active research program.

== History ==
The library was incorporated in 1918. The architect for the library was Waddy Butler Wood. In 1922, the Thomas Balch Library was constructed in Leesburg, Virginia as a memorial to historian Thomas Balch, a Leesburg native. Thomas Willing Balch (1866-1927) and Edwin Swift Balch (1856-1927), sons of Thomas Balch, originally endowed the subscription library. The Library is part of the Leesburg Historic District.

The Thomas Balch Library operated for fifty years under a private Board of Trustees. The library was staffed by volunteers and part-time employees. In 1960 the library dropped its subscription and became a free, though segregated, public library. It was desegregated in 1965. In 1973, the Loudoun County Public Library system was established. The Thomas Balch Library joined as a full service public library branch in 1974, alongside the Purcellville, Purcellville Bookmobile and Sterling libraries.

In 1994, ownership of the Thomas Balch Library was transferred from the Loudoun County Public Library system to the Town of Leesburg. Under the Town of Leesburg, the library began operating as a history and genealogy library. The Martin L. Cook photograph collection was acquired by the library in 2008. Cook was commissioned after training at the Tuskegee Army Flying School and went on to serve in the U.S. Navy in the Department of Defense as an aeronautical engineer.

In 2003 a Palladio Award in the category "Traditional Buildings" was given to Bowie Gridley Architects for a "sympathetic" addition to the Library building. The addition doubled the size of the 1922 building.

In 2013, the state legislature passed a special bill enabling the Library to receive a gift of $618,000 left to it by Virginia L. Bowie, a Leesburg resident and longtime library volunteer. The Library also holds an annual fundraising event at various local historic sites.

== Services ==
The Thomas Balch Library offers patrons many services. Research and reference services include general collection research, databases and electronic resources, the Loudoun County cemetery database, research guides and book indices, and digital exhibits. The special collections include archives, manuscripts, cemetery records, census records, deeds and wills, genealogies and family histories, historic house files, maps, microforms, military collections, newspapers, oral histories, rare books, tax rolls, vertical files, visual collections, and vital records.

== Loudoun History Awards ==
Every year, the Thomas Balch Library presents the Loudoun History Awards. These awards are sponsored by the Thomas Balch Library Advisory Commission. The awards were established to recognize contributions of local historian John Elbert Devine (1911-1996), in preserving Loudoun County history. The Loudoun History Awards were initially started in 1993.

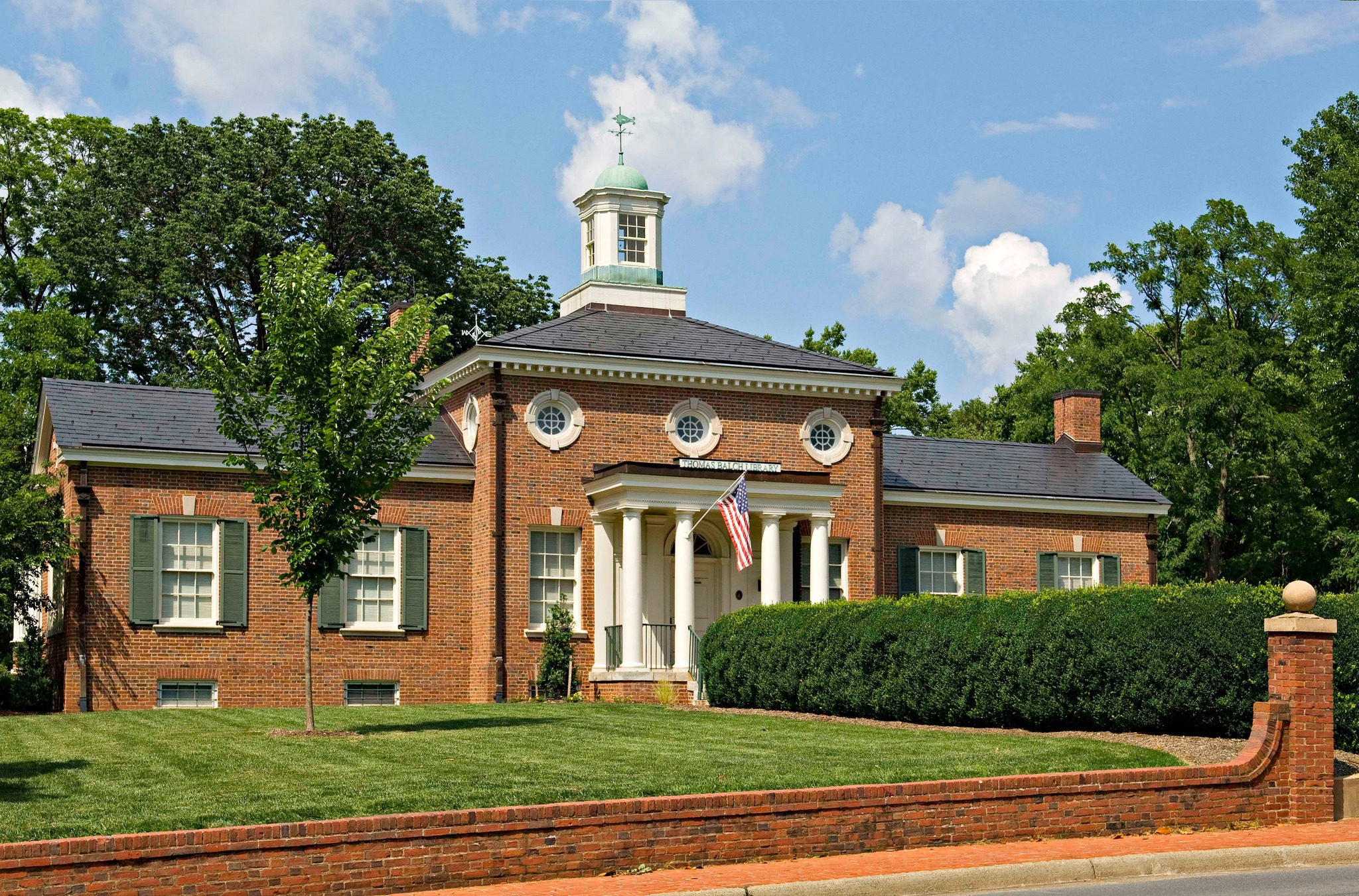
Thomas Balch Library

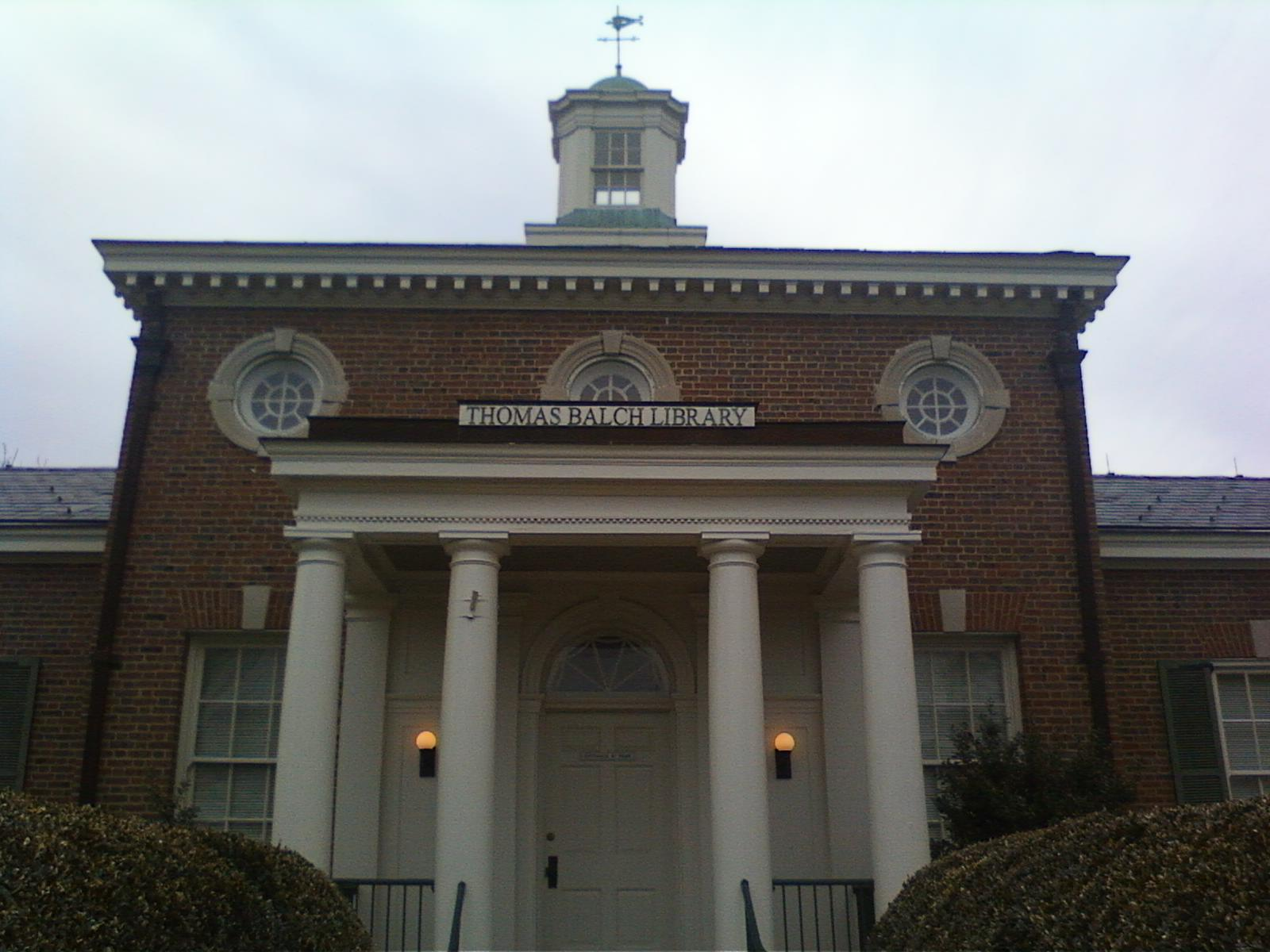
Thomas Balch Library Front View

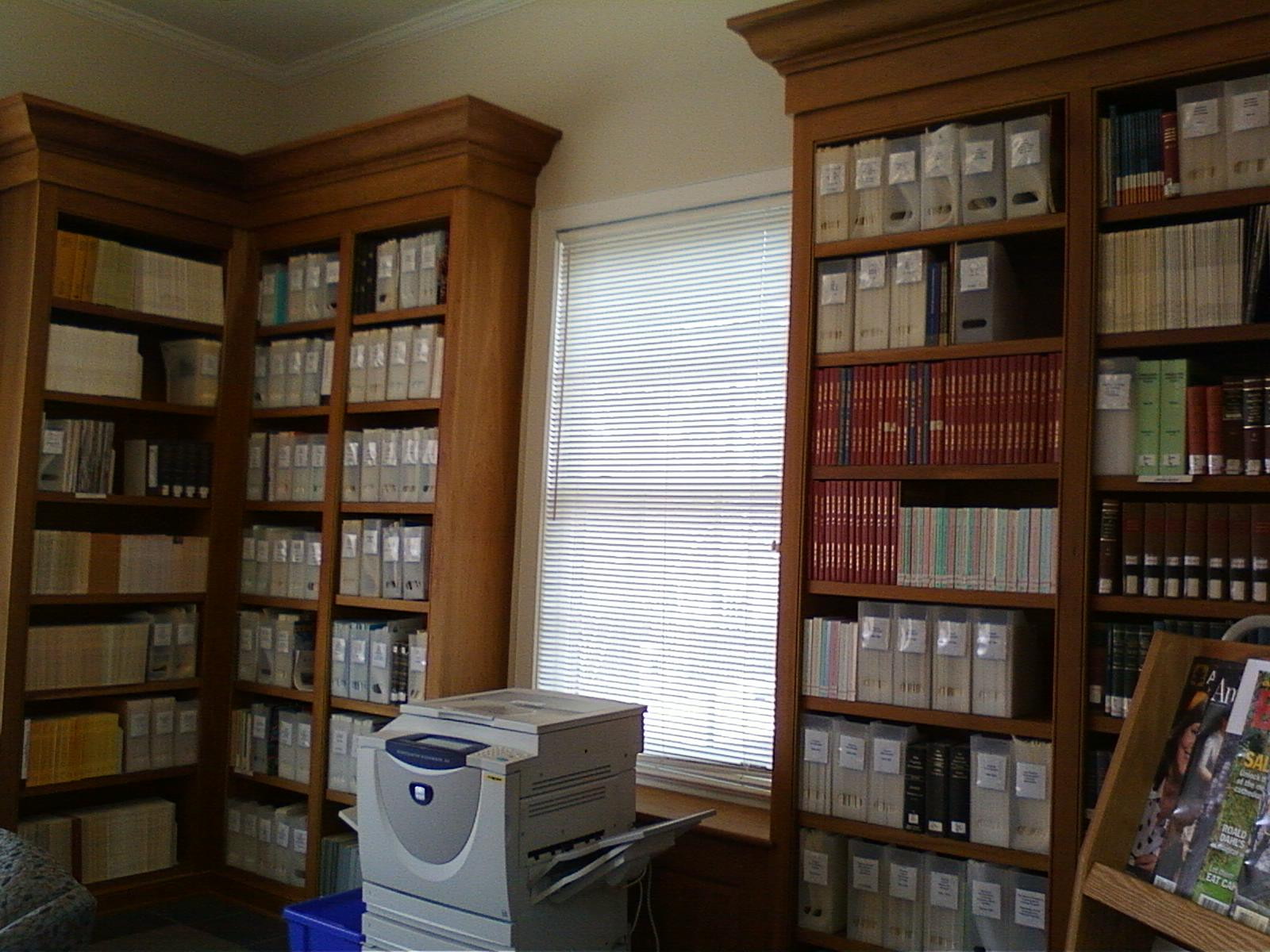
Thomas Balch Library Interior #1

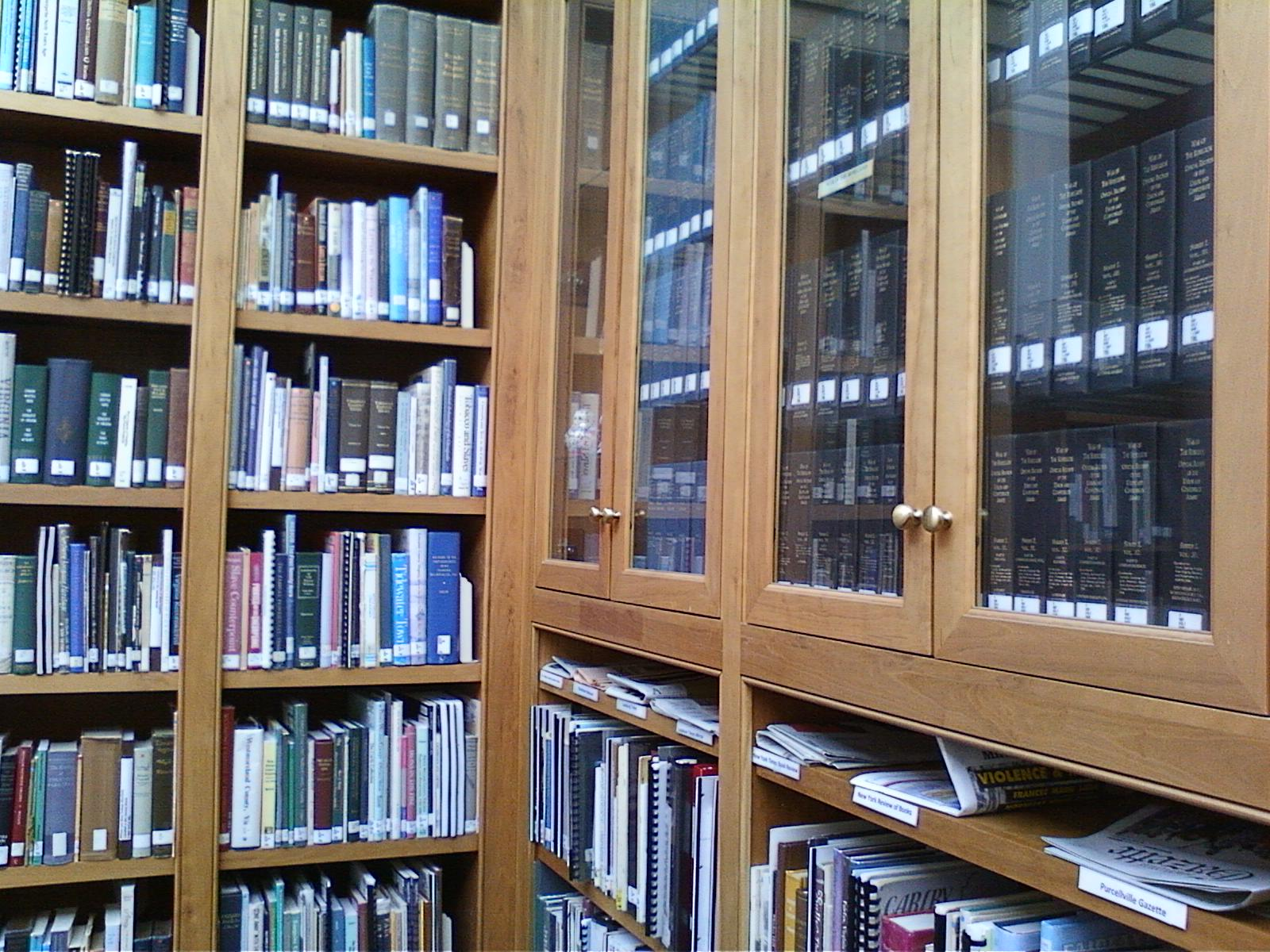
Thomas Balch Library Interior #2

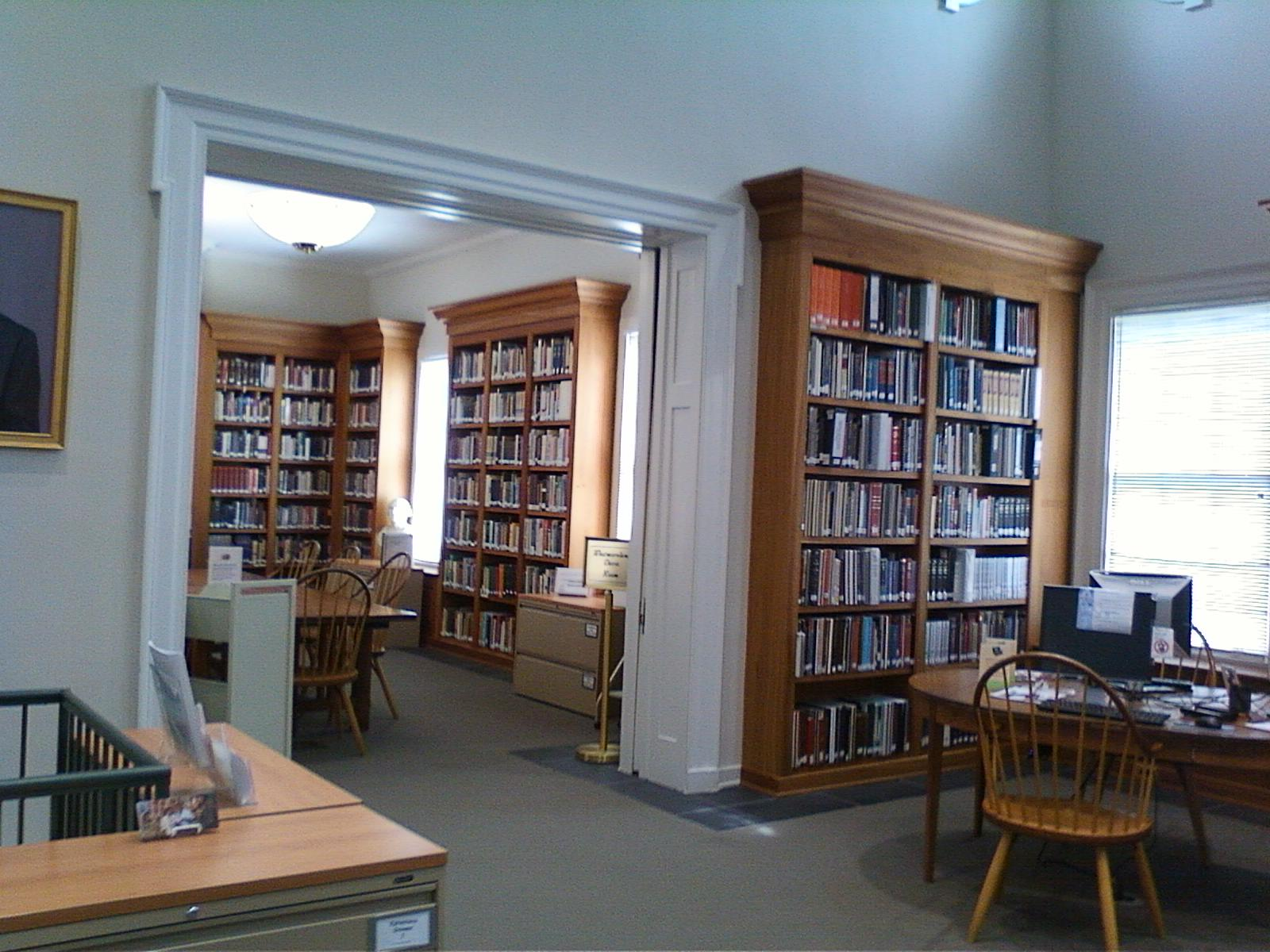
Thomas Balch Library Interior #3

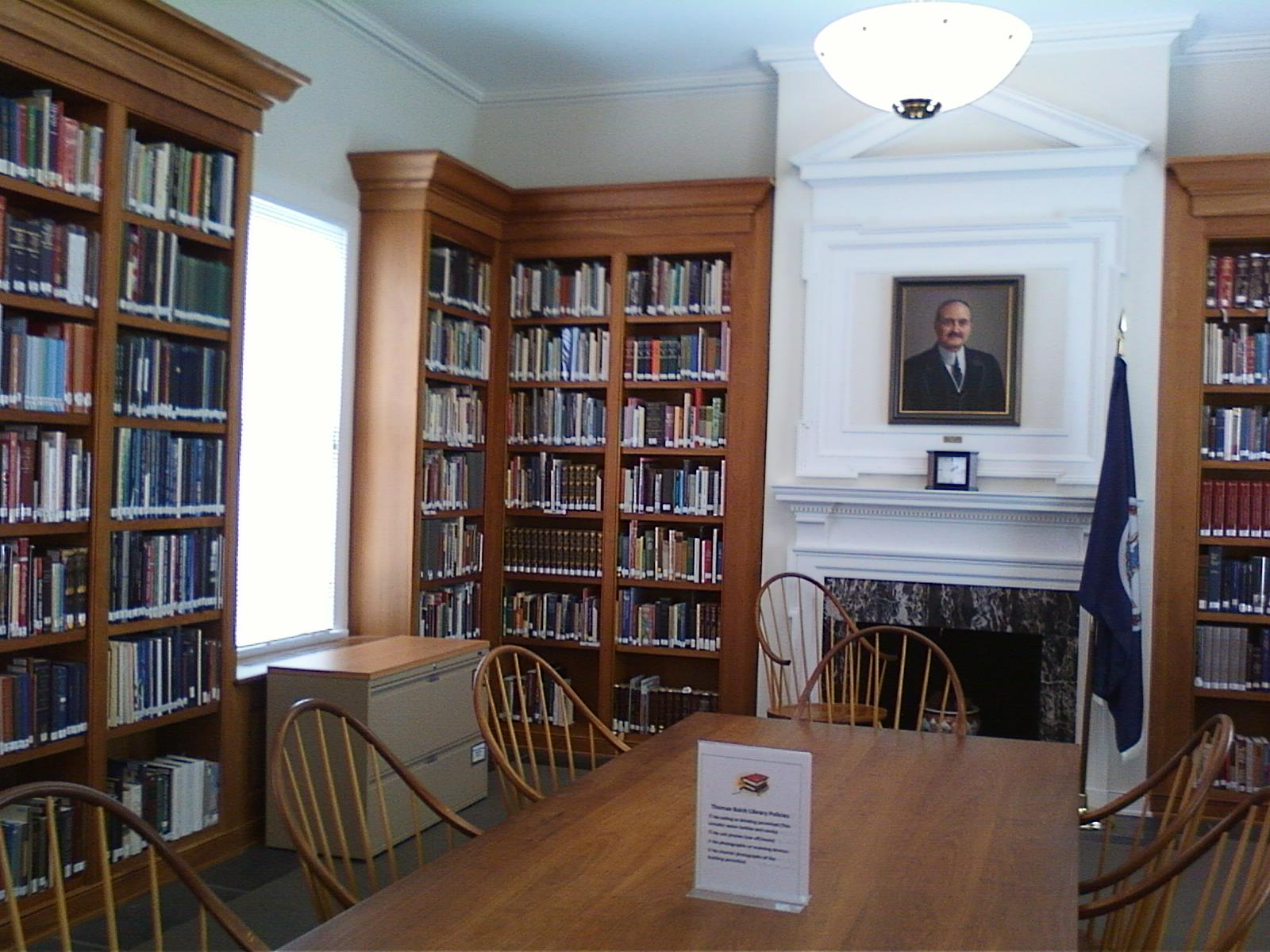
Thomas Balch Library Interior #4

== Research ==
In February 2012 the library published work connecting slaves with their modern-day descendants.

The library now serves as a designated Underground Railroad research site.

On March 31, 2010, the Thomas Balch Library and George Mason University announced an agreement for academic cooperation.
