= Cascades, Virginia =

- Census-designated place
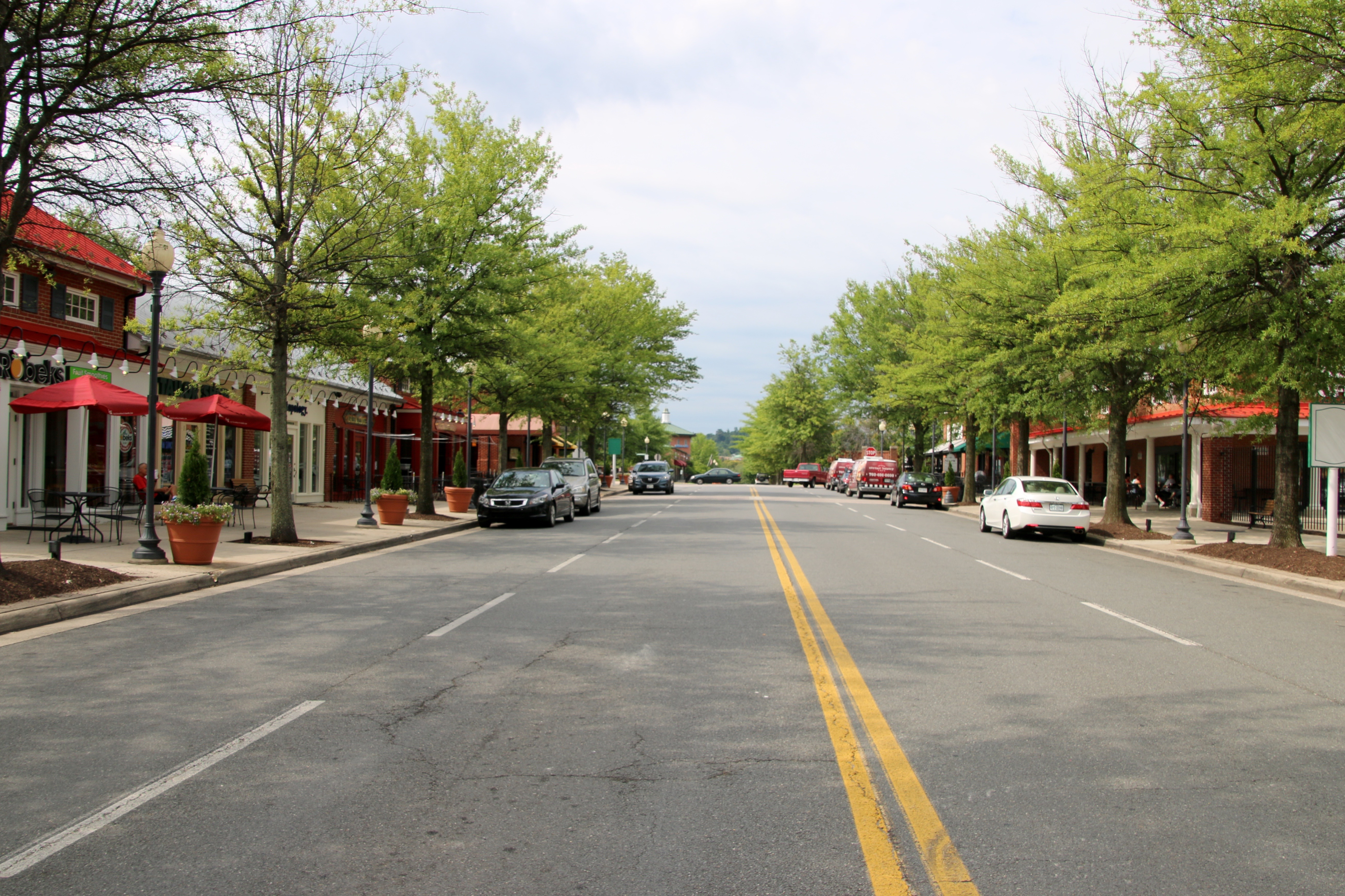
- The Cascades Marketplace, designed with a "main street" aesthetic

- Location within Northern Virginia Location within Virginia Location within the United States
- Coordinates: 39°2′54″N 77°23′1″W
- Country: United States
- State: Virginia
- County: Loudoun

Area
  - Total: 3.75 sq mi (9.71 km^{2})
  - Land: 3.69 sq mi (9.55 km^{2})
  - Water: 0.062 sq mi (0.16 km^{2})
- Elevation: 270 ft (82 m)

Population (2010)
  - Total: 11,912
  - Density: 3,232/sq mi (1,247.8/km^{2})
- Time zone: UTC−5 (Eastern (EST))
  - Summer (DST): UTC−4 (EDT)
- ZIP code: 20165
- Area codes: 703 and 571
- FIPS code: 51-13403
- GNIS feature ID: 2584825

Cascades is a census-designated place (CDP) in Loudoun County, Virginia, United States. As of the 2020 census, Cascades had a population of 12,366. Along with nearby Countryside and Lowes Island, it is considered one of the three main components of the Potomac Falls community (ZIP code 20165) within Sterling.

Cascades is a planned community of 2,500 acres (1,000 ha) with approximately 6,500 homes. The corresponding homeowners association was incorporated on November 8, 1990. As in nearby Sterling Park, prior to the establishment of the Cascades community in 1990 the area was made up of a few very large farms. The homeowners association maintains five community centers, five swimming pools, 15 tennis courts, and other amenities including extensive paved walking trails. The Lowes Island at Cascades community (commonly referred to as Lowes Island) is an advertised portion of the legal subdivision of Cascades, but is not a legal subdivision itself. The Lowes Island community is centered on Trump National Golf Club Washington, D.C., formerly Lowes Island Country Club. The Cascades development is bordered on the north by the Potomack Lake Sportsplex and Algonkian Regional Park (which abuts the Potomac River); both facilities are included in the Cascades census-designated place. The name "Cascades" alludes to the rapidly descending flow along the Potomac River starting at Lowes Island and leading to Great Falls.

== Businesses ==
The commercial core of Cascades is Cascades Marketplace, a 318,000-square-foot (29,500 m^{2}) retail center adjacent to the Cascades Public Library and very near the Loudoun campus of Northern Virginia Community College. Great Falls Plaza is a second, smaller retail center located just outside Lowes Island. Area public schools include Potomac Falls High School, River Bend Middle School, Potowmack Elementary School, Horizon Elementary School, and Lowes Island Elementary School. The Cascades area encompasses the gated campus of the Falcons Landing retirement community for retired U.S. military officers. Cascades is served by Loudoun County Sheriff's Office, the Sterling Volunteer Fire Department, and the Potomac Falls post office.

== Demographics ==
Historical population
Census	Pop.	Note	%±
2010	11,912		—
2020	12,366		3.8%
U.S. Decennial Census; 2010 2020

=== 2020 census ===
As of the 2020 census, Cascades had a population of 12,366. The median age was 39.6 years. 22.6% of residents were under the age of 18 and 11.9% of residents were 65 years of age or older. For every 100 females there were 95.3 males, and for every 100 females age 18 and over there were 91.2 males age 18 and over.

100.0% of residents lived in urban areas, while 0.0% lived in rural areas.

There were 4,459 households in Cascades, of which 36.8% had children under the age of 18 living in them. Of all households, 59.5% were married-couple households, 14.3% were households with a male householder and no spouse or partner present, and 22.2% were households with a female householder and no spouse or partner present. About 20.5% of all households were made up of individuals and 7.9% had someone living alone who was 65 years of age or older.

There were 4,582 housing units, of which 2.7% were vacant. The homeowner vacancy rate was 0.9% and the rental vacancy rate was 4.4%.

Racial composition as of the 2020 census
Race	Number	Percent
White	7,711	62.4%
Black or African American	858	6.9%
American Indian and Alaska Native	26	0.2%
Asian	1,907	15.4%
Native Hawaiian and Other Pacific Islander	14	0.1%
Some other race	510	4.1%
Two or more races	1,340	10.8%
Hispanic or Latino (of any race)	1,398	11.3%

=== 2010 census ===
Cascades was first listed as a census designated place in the 2010 U.S. census.

== Neighboring communities ==
The Potomack Lakes Sportsplex and Algonkian Regional Park are north of the Cascades development but are included in the Cascades census-designated place. The northern boundary of the CDP is the Potomac River. Neighboring communities to the CDP are:

- To the east, Sugarland Run and Lowes Island
- To the west, Countryside
- To the south, across Route 7, Dulles Town Center and the remainder of Sterling (outside Cascades) including Sterling Park.

== Gallery ==
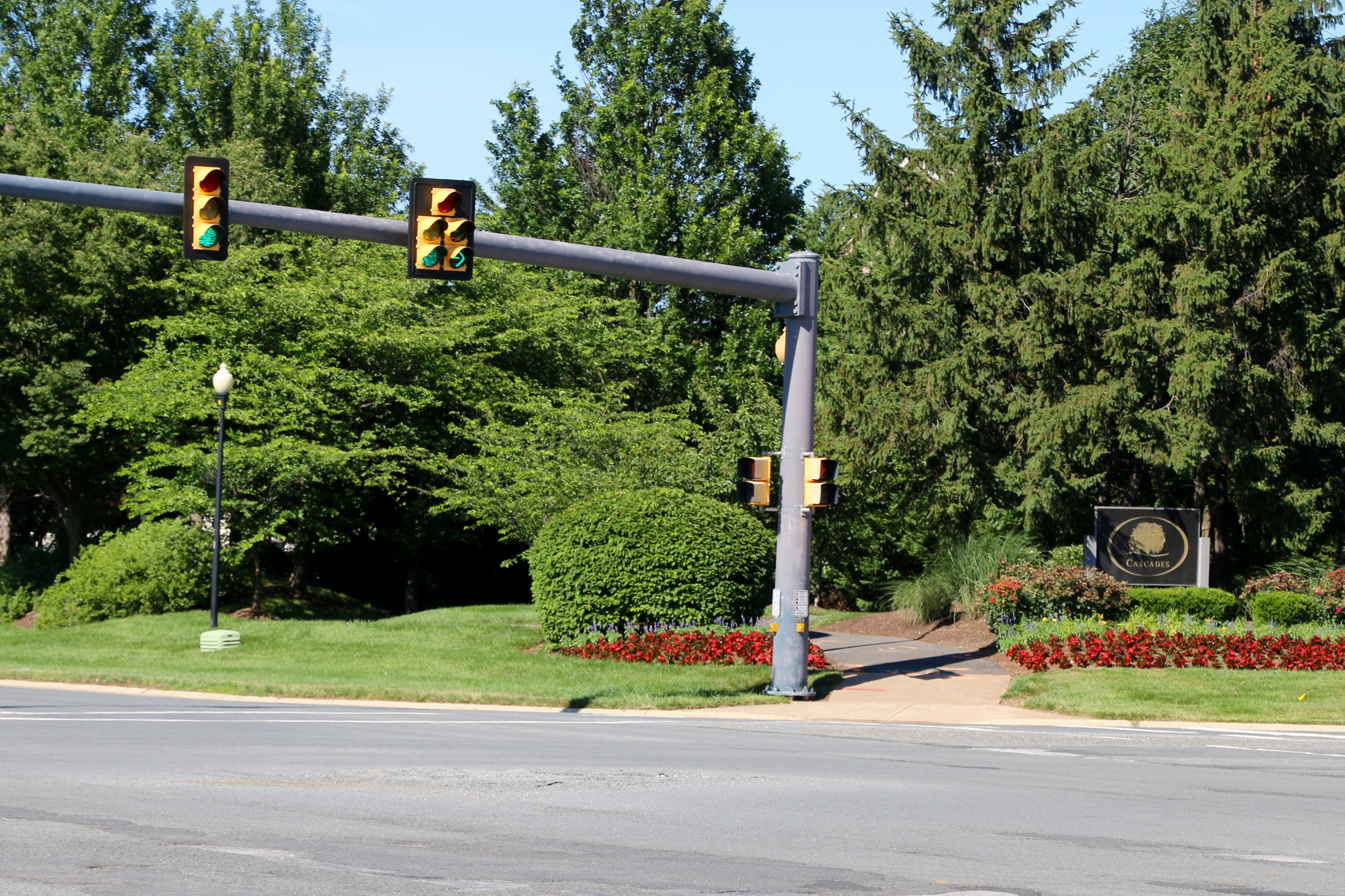
The entrance to the Cascades community along Cascades Parkway at Palisade Parkway. The Cascades logo can be seen in the lower right.

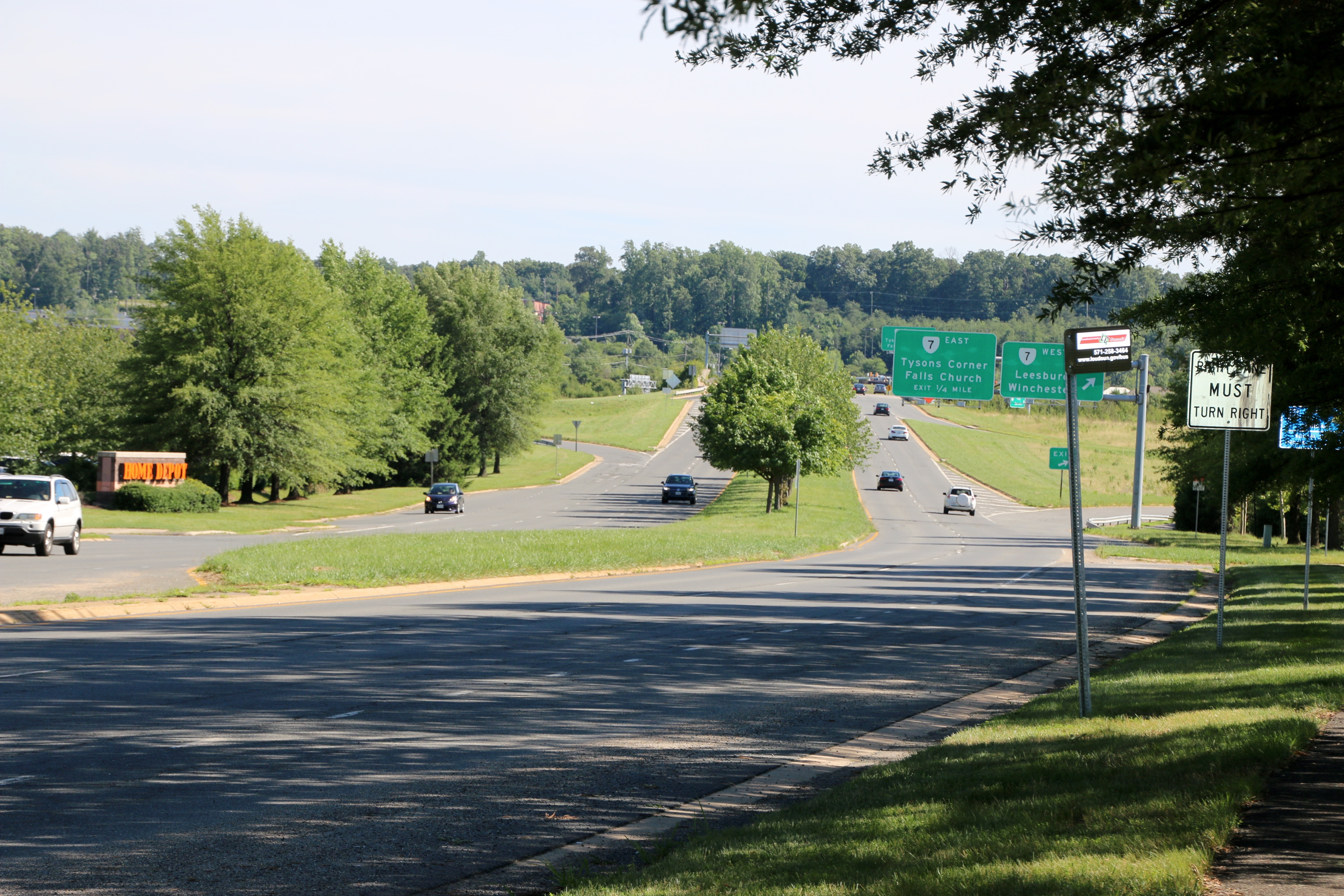
Leaving Cascades along Cascades Parkway toward Virginia State Route 7

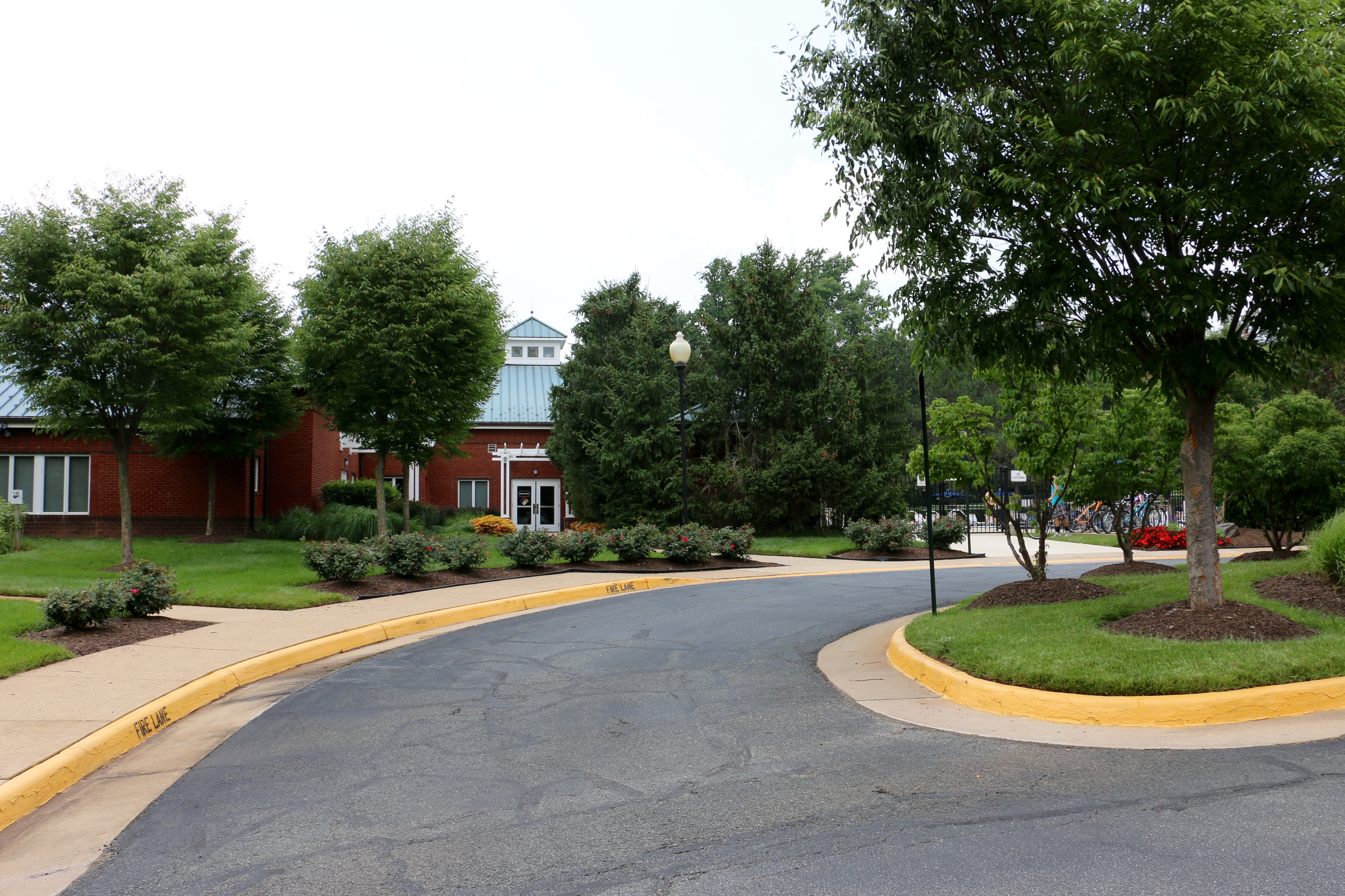
The main office of the Cascades homeowners association

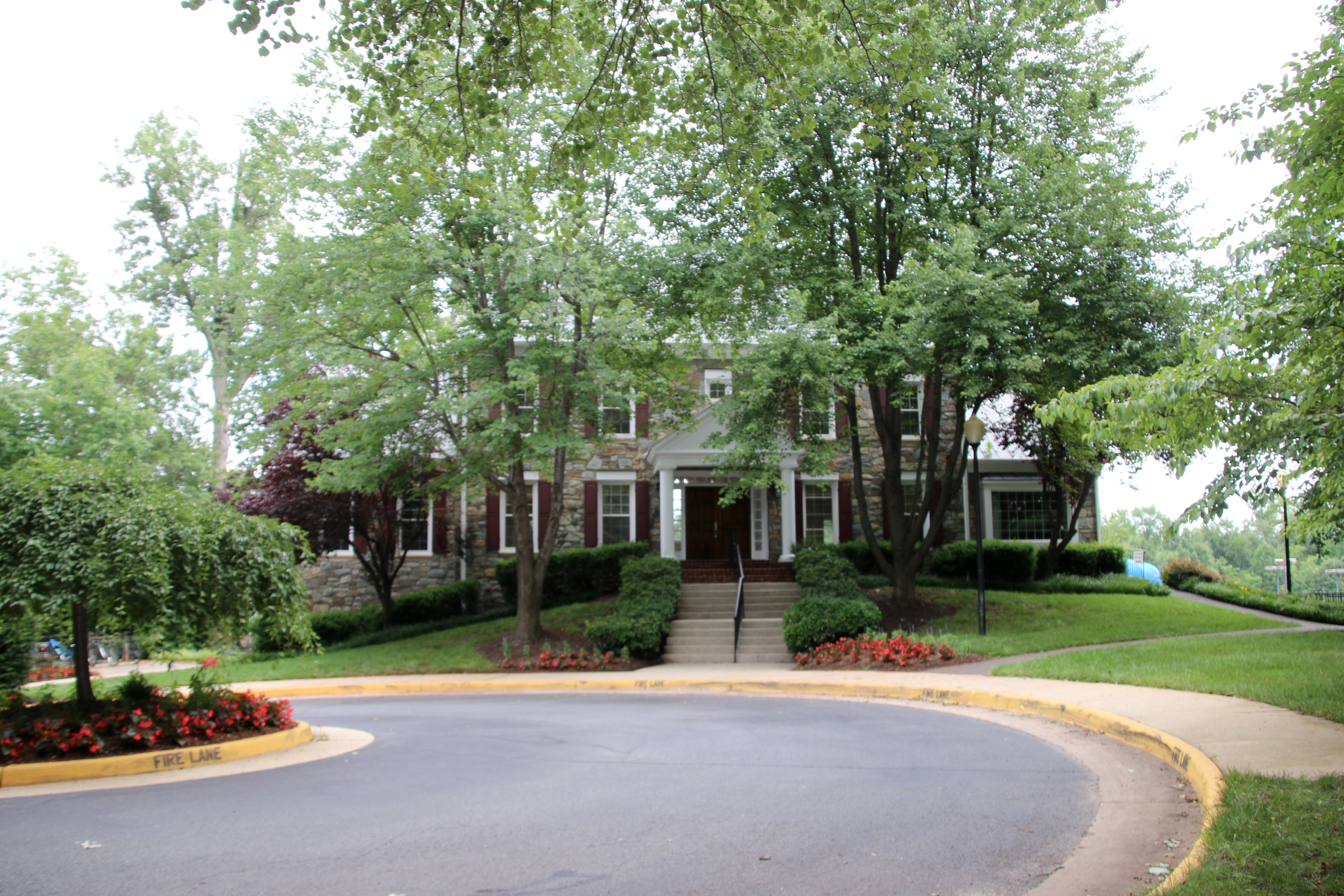
Stone House, one of five community centers in Cascades

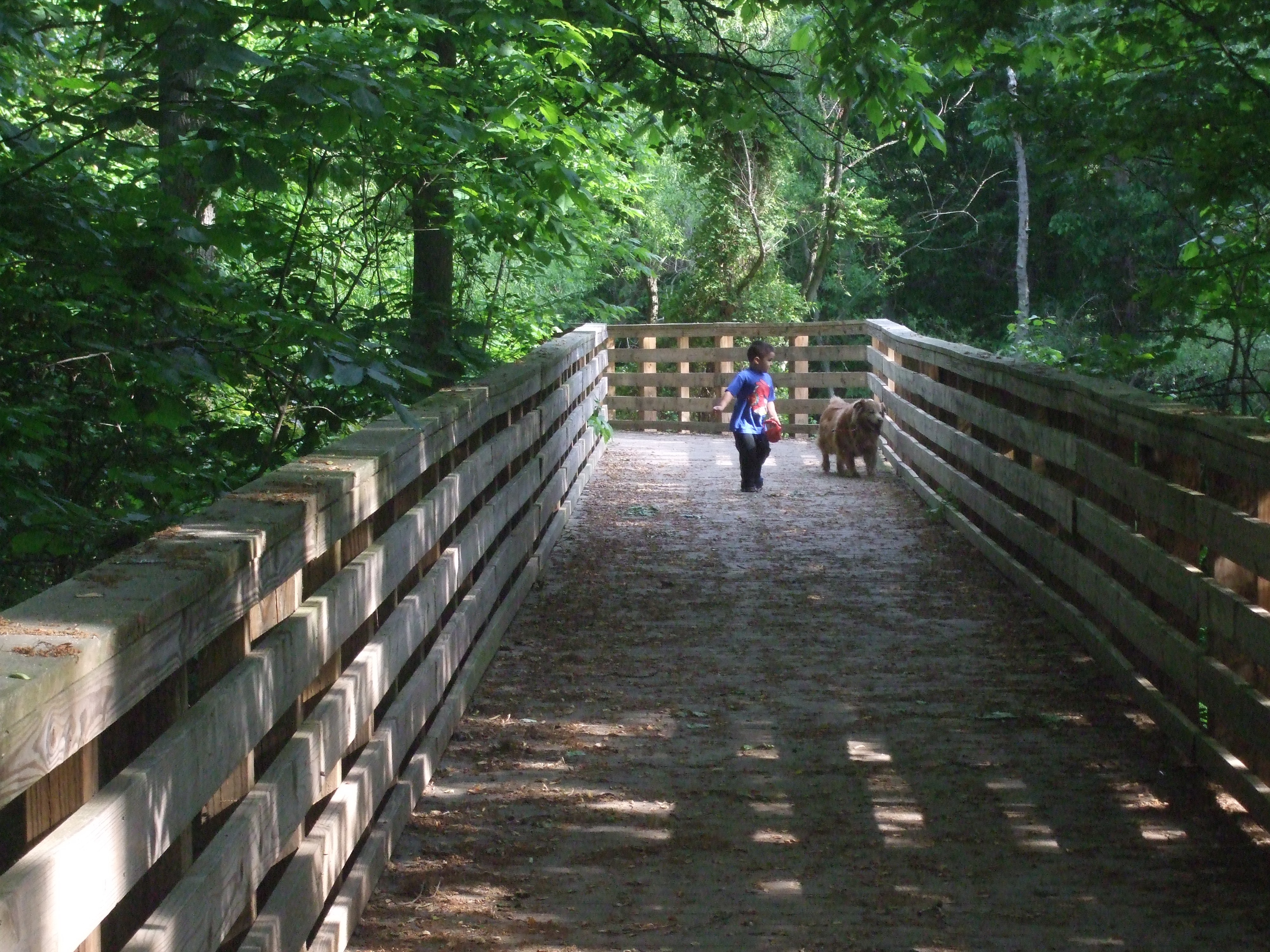
One of many paved walking trails in Cascades

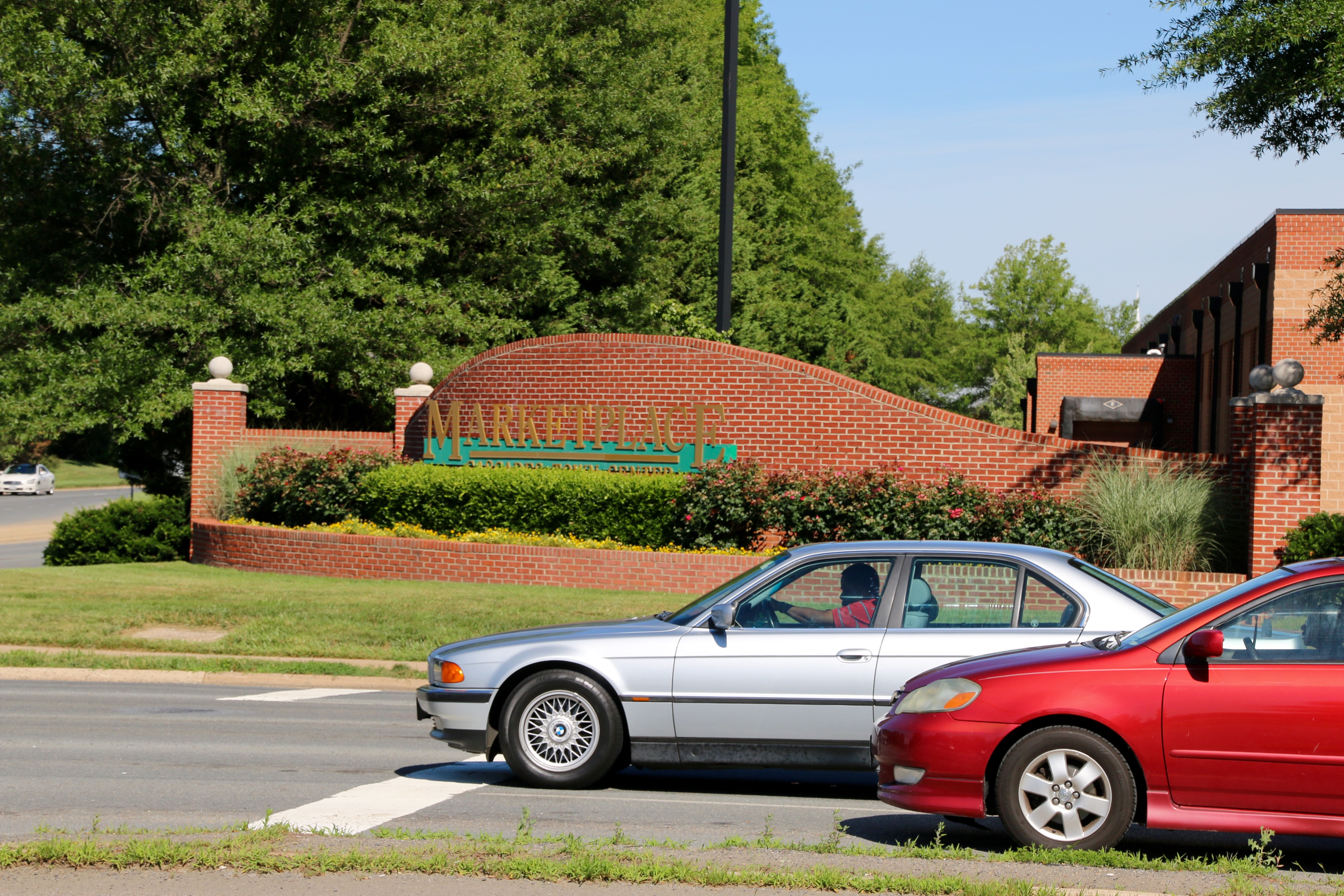
One corner of the Cascades Marketplace

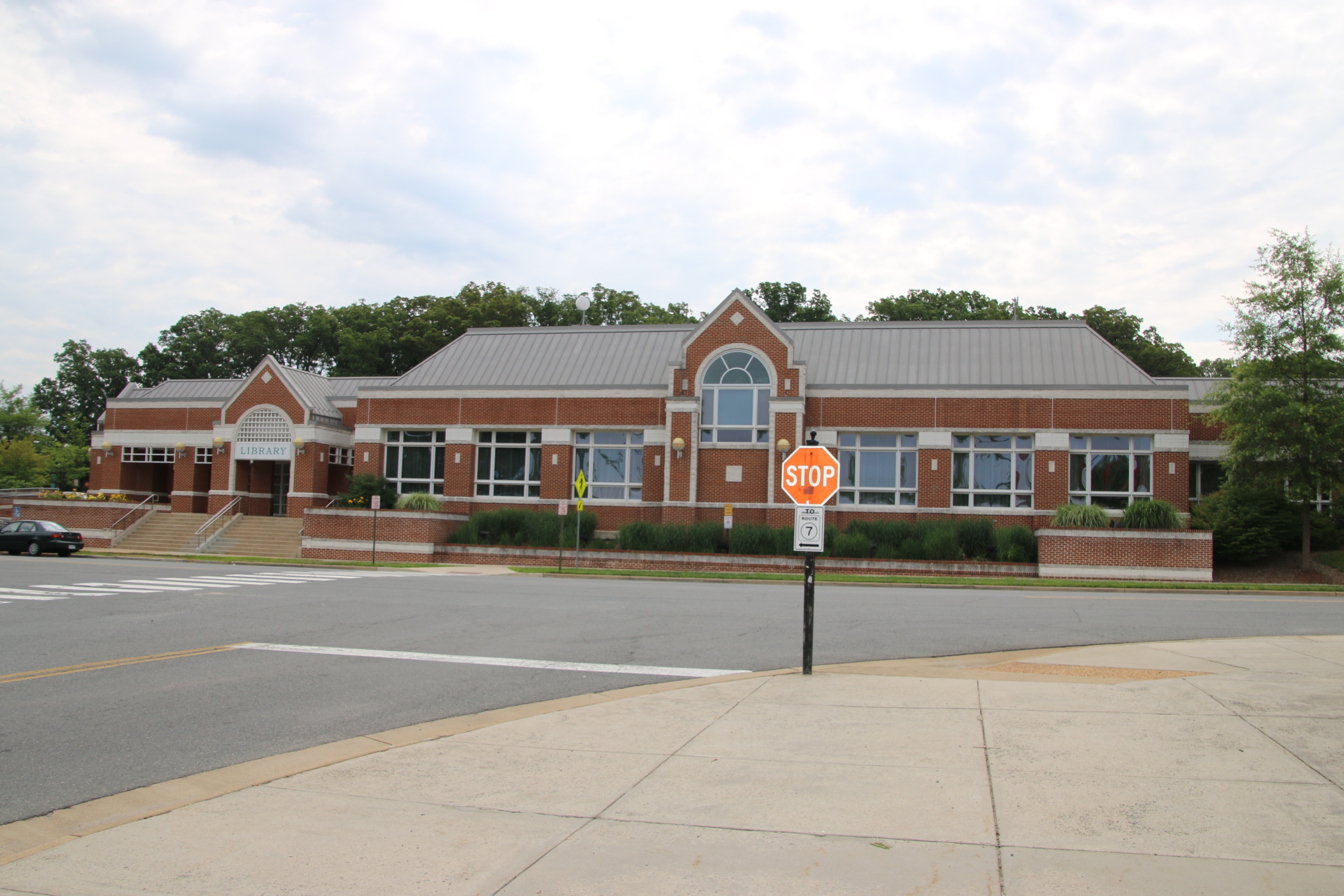
Cascades Public Library as seen from Cascades Marketplace

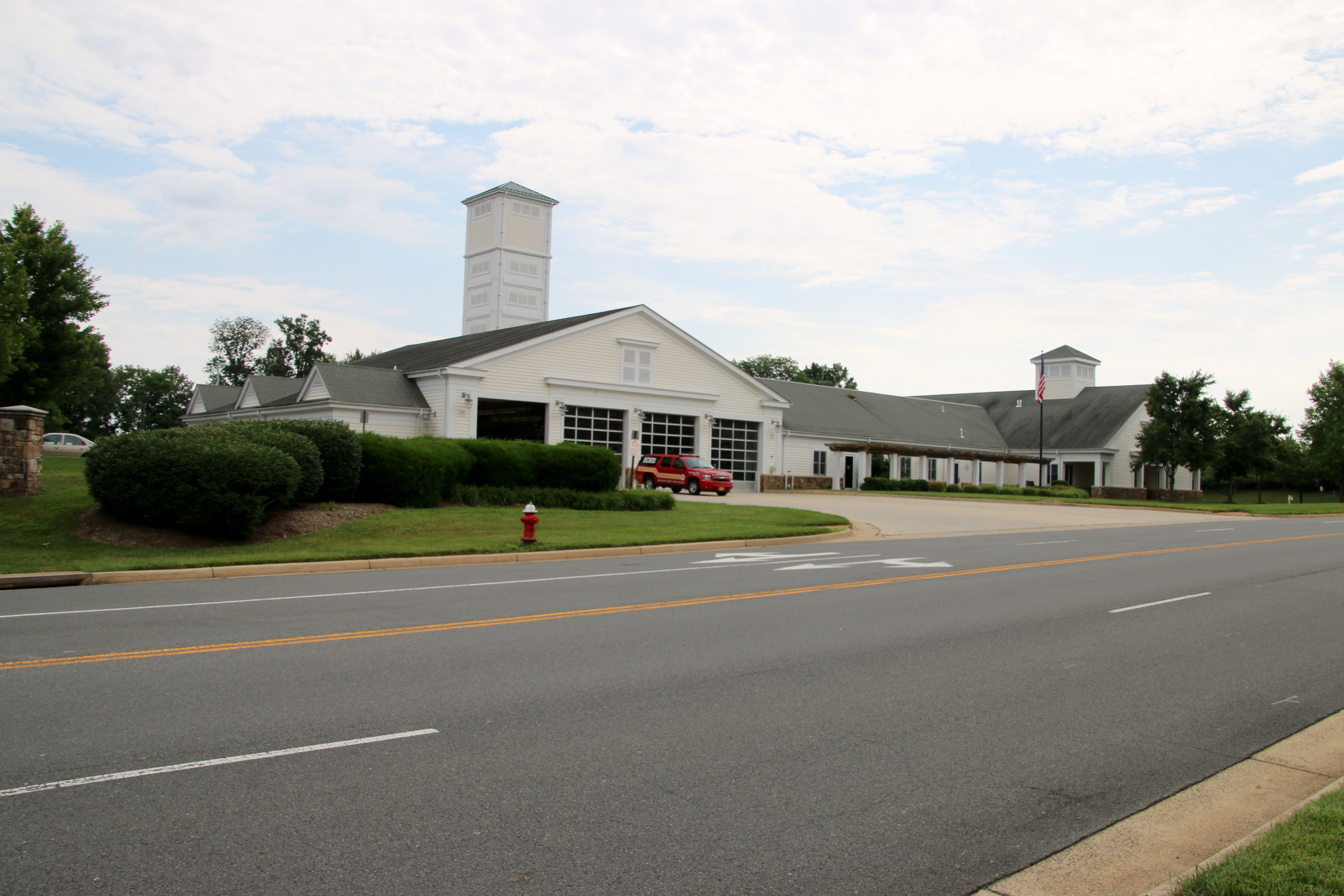
The Cascades fire station of the Sterling Volunteer Fire Department

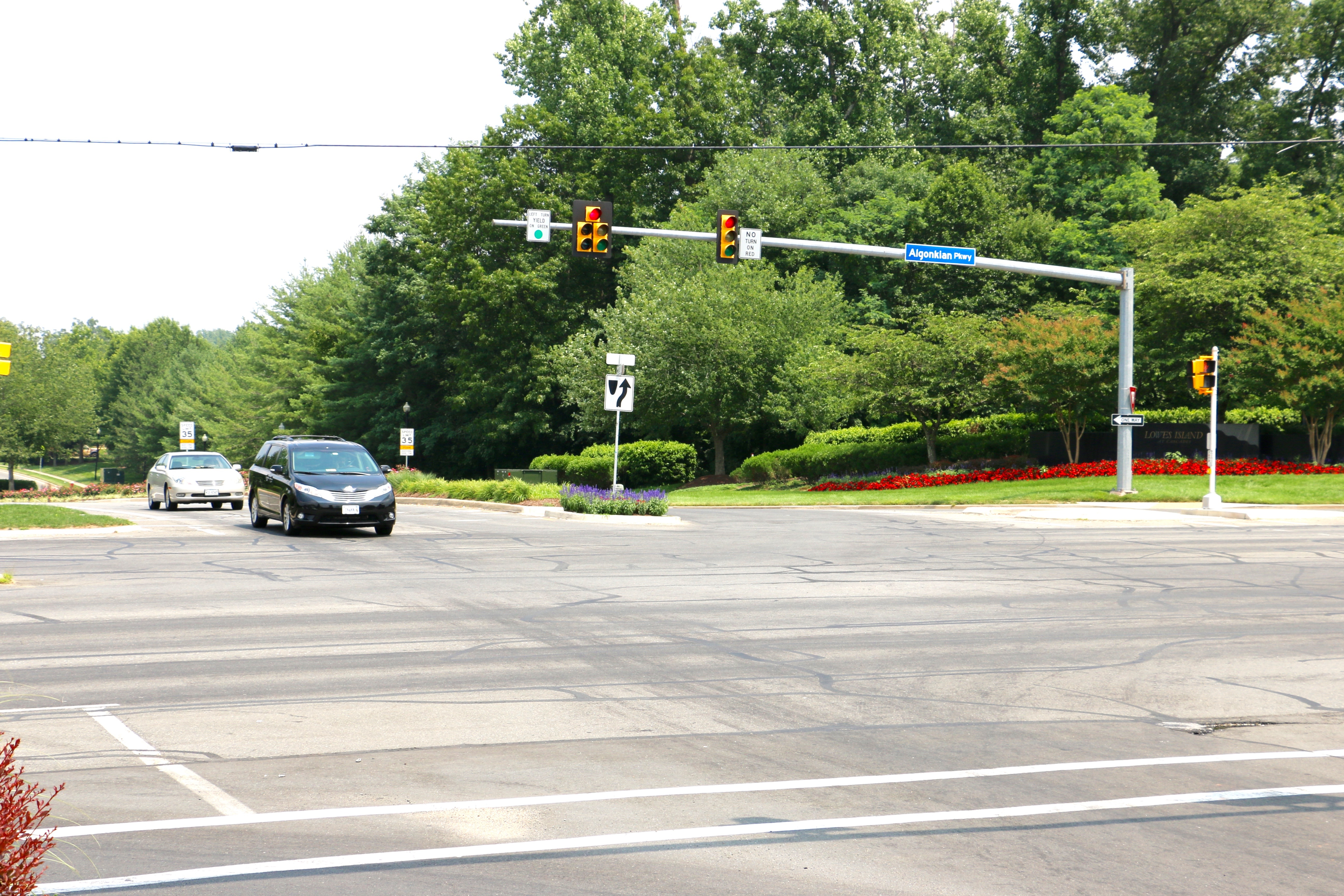
The entrance to the Lowes Island subdivision

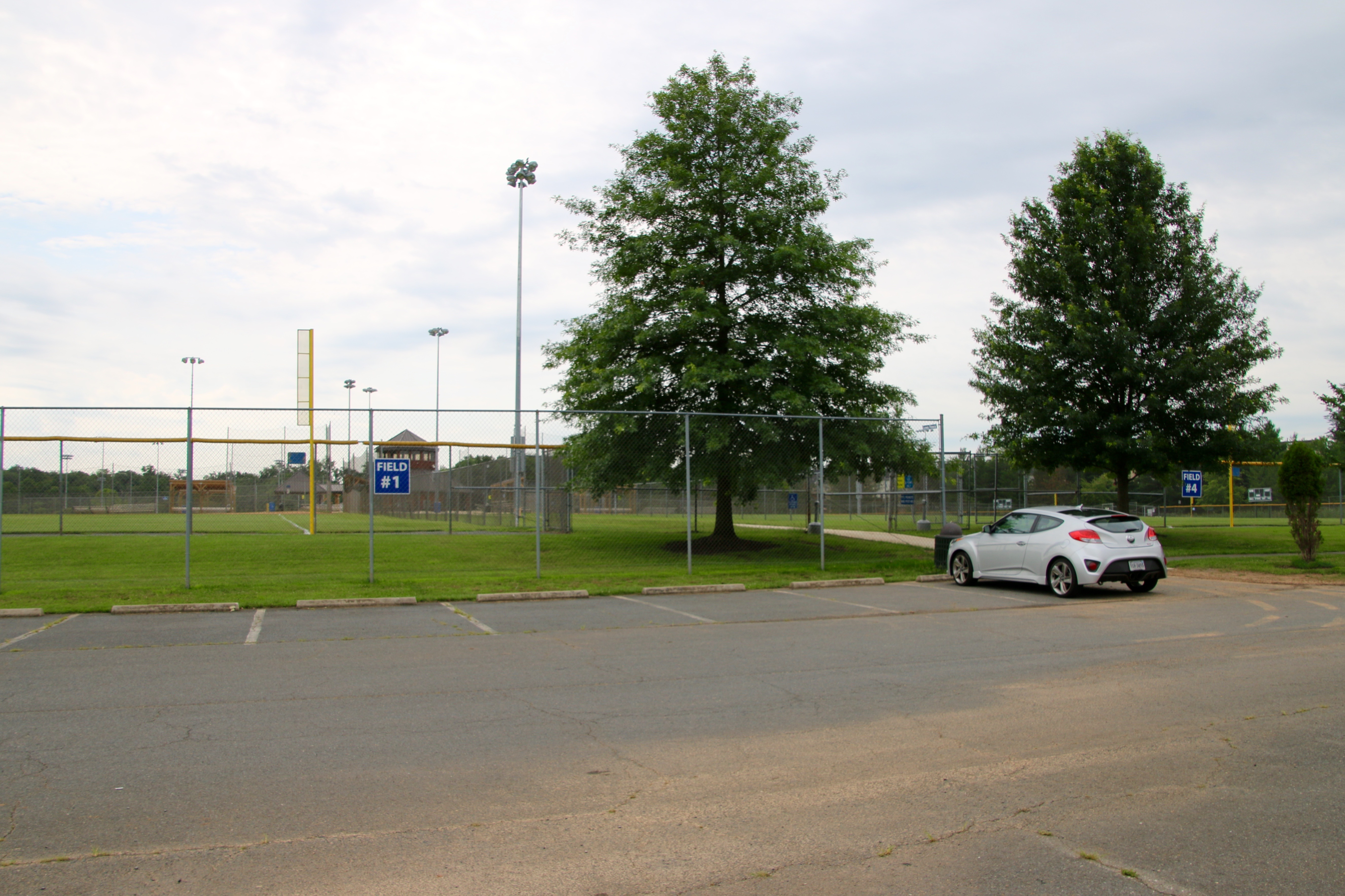
The Potomack Sportsplex, just outside the entrance to Algonkian Regional Park

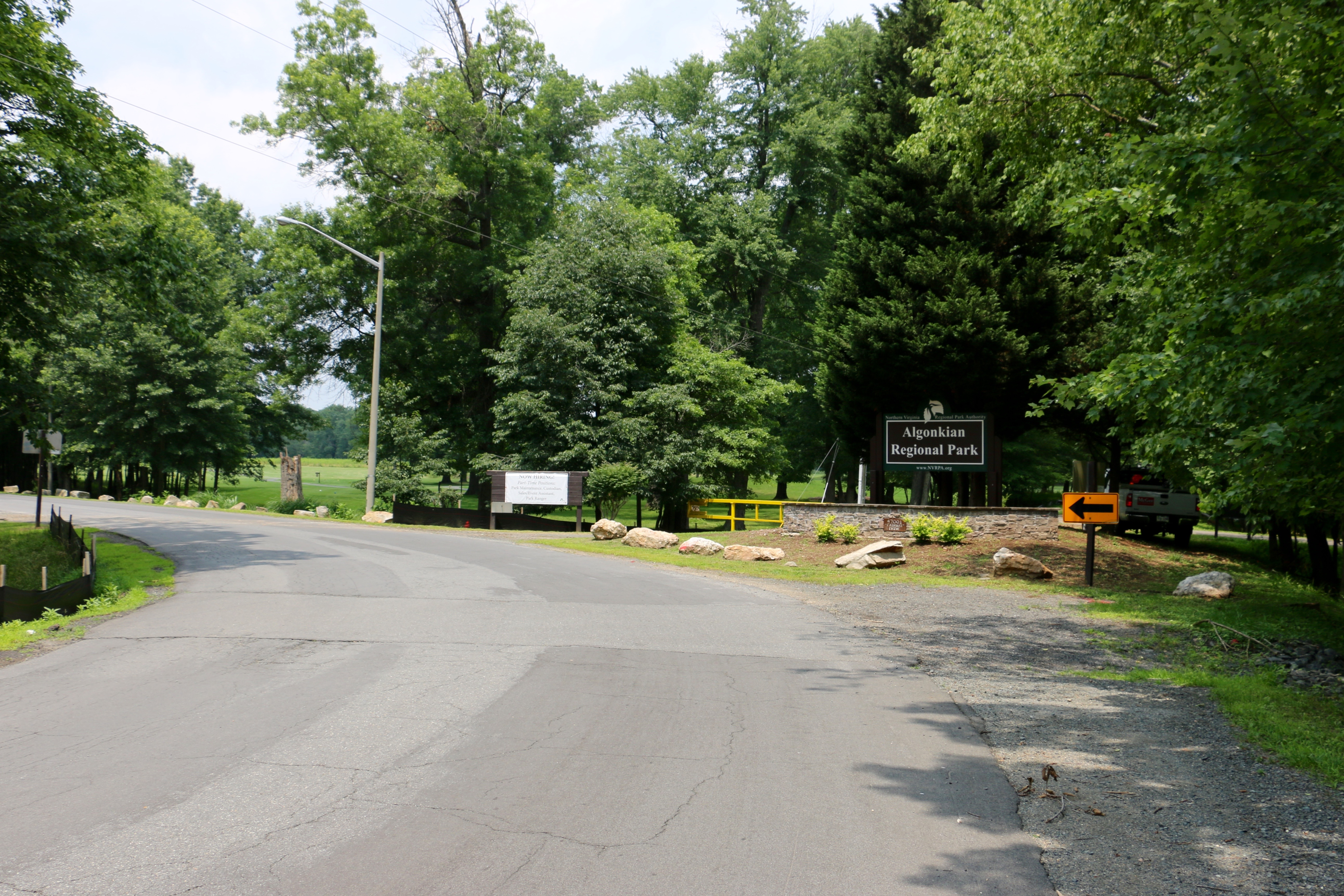
The entrance to Algonkian Regional Park

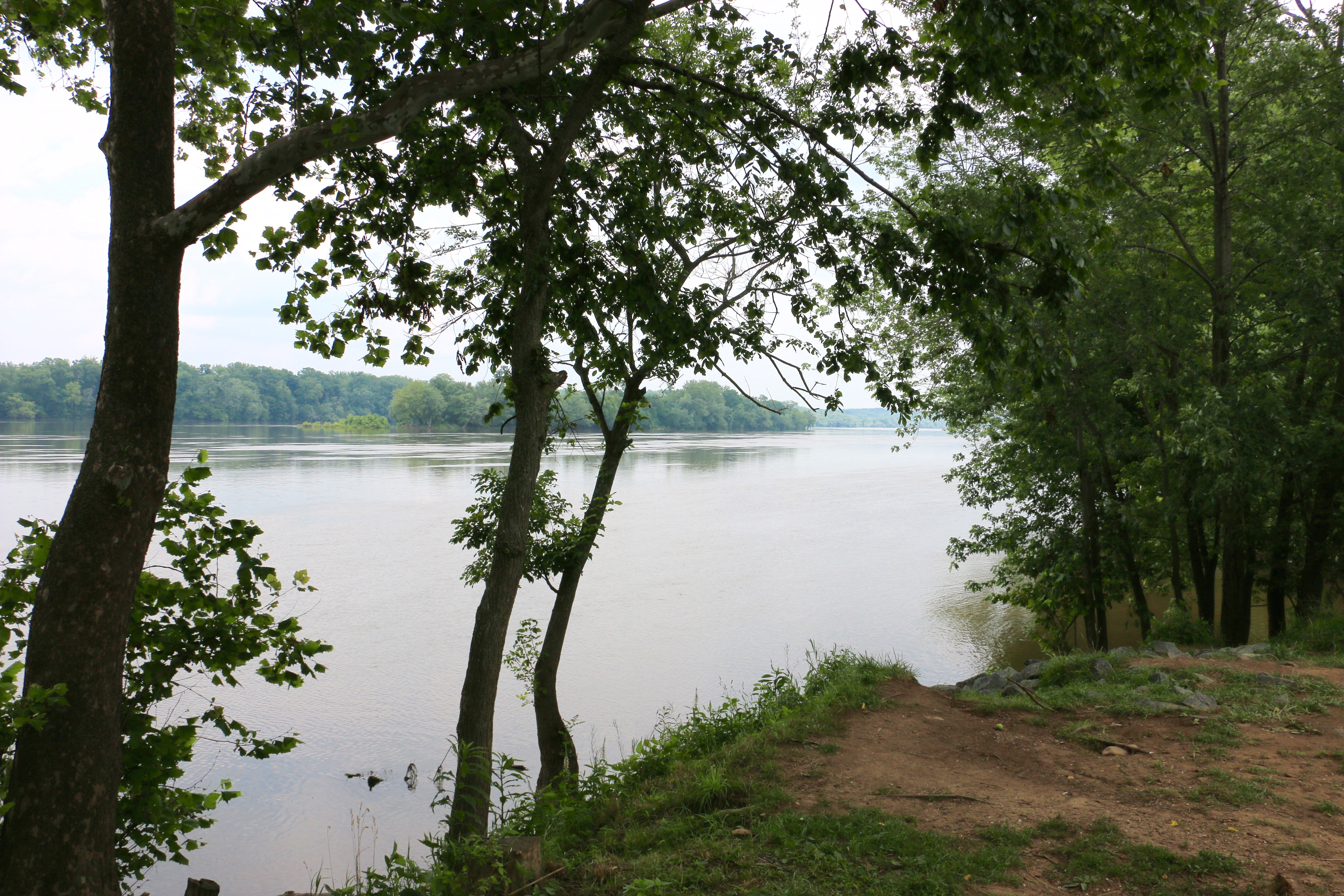
The Potomac River at Algonkian Regional Park

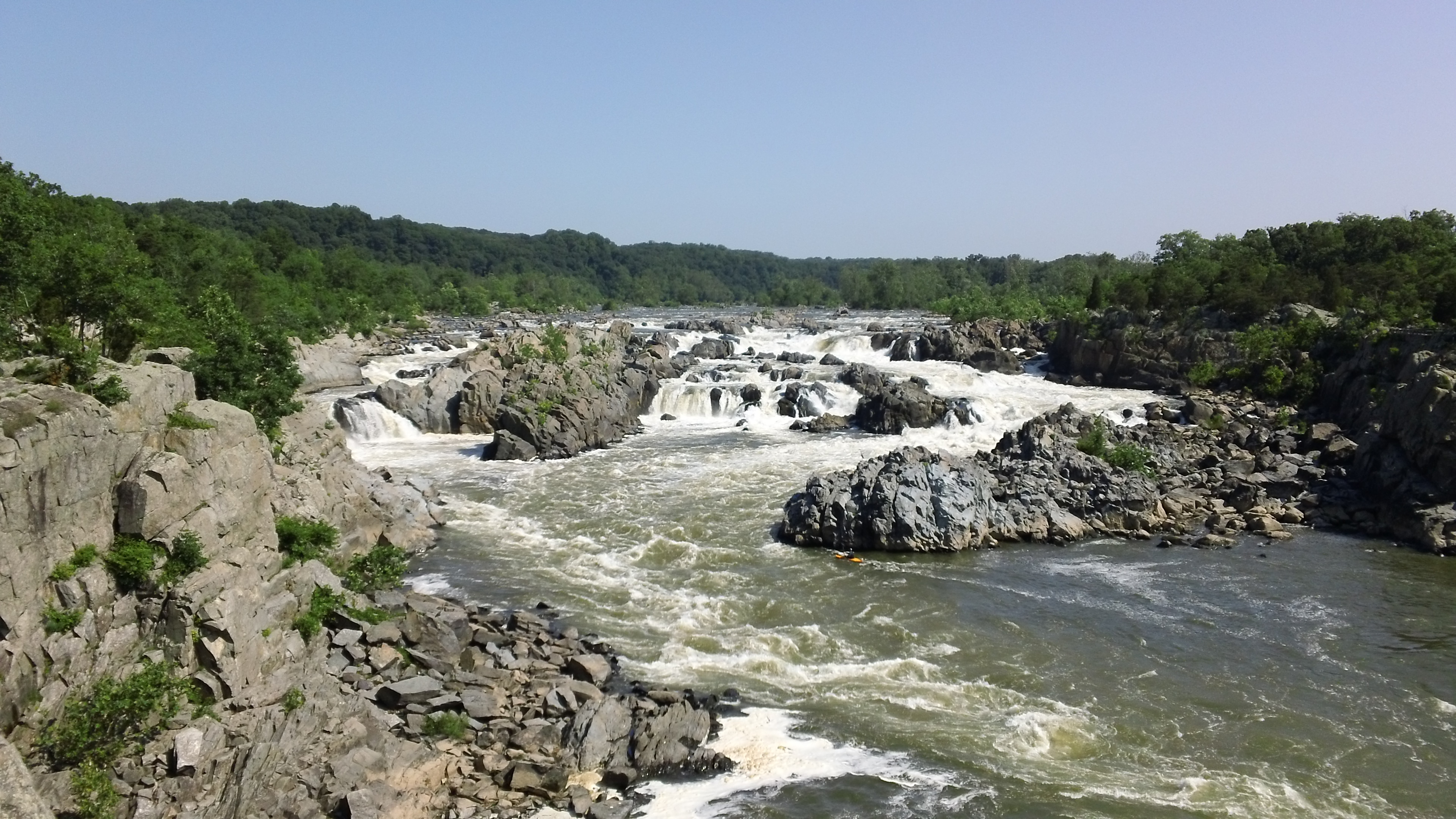
The Potomac River descends along the northern edge of the Cascades community until it reaches Great Falls Park 8 miles (13 km) downstream.
