= Countryside, Virginia =

- Census-designated place
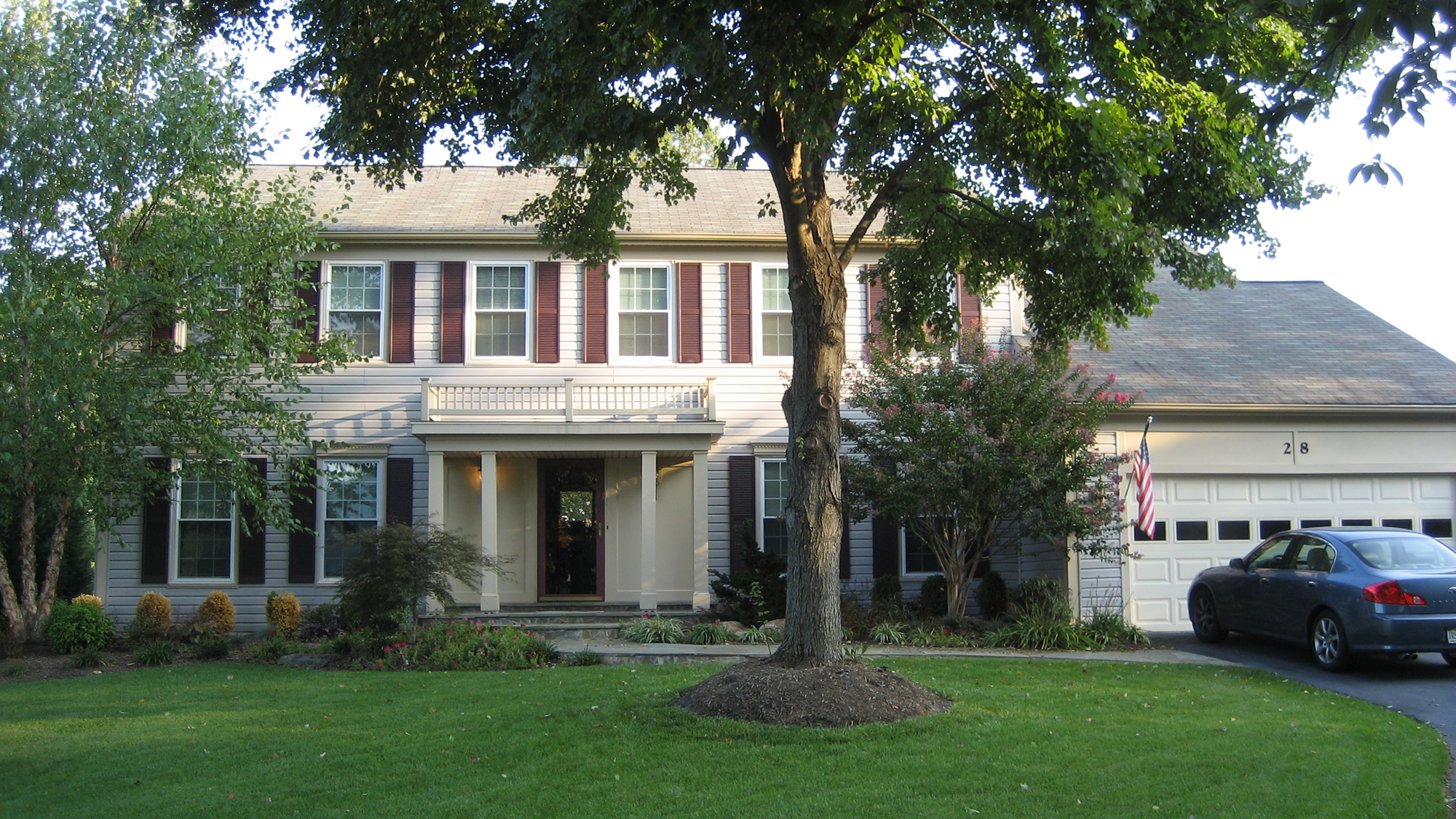
- A typical colonial-style single-family home in Countryside

- Location within Northern Virginia Location within Virginia Location within the United States
- Coordinates: 39°2′52″N 77°24′52″W
- Country: United States
- State: Virginia
- County: Loudoun

Area
  - Total: 2.58 sq mi (6.69 km^{2})
  - Land: 2.57 sq mi (6.65 km^{2})
  - Water: 0.015 sq mi (0.04 km^{2})
- Elevation: 250 ft (76 m)

Population (2020)
  - Total: 10,418
  - Density: 3,923/sq mi (1,514.7/km^{2})
- Time zone: UTC−5 (Eastern (EST))
  - Summer (DST): UTC−4 (EDT)
- ZIP code: 20165 (Sterling)
- Area codes: 703 and 571
- FIPS code: 51-19560
- GNIS feature ID: 2584833

Countryside is a census-designated place in Loudoun County, Virginia, United States. As of the 2020 census, Countryside had a population of 10,418. It is located approximately 27 miles (43 km) northwest of Washington and is bounded by the Potomac River to the north, and by Route 7 (Leesburg Pike) to the south. Located in eastern Loudoun County, it is about 9 miles (14 km) north of Washington Dulles International Airport. It is bordered by the community of Cascades to the east and by Dulles Town Center to the south, across Route 7.

== History ==
The Countryside subdivision was conceived in the middle 1970s when a tract of 1,000 acres (400 ha) of open farmland was subdivided in preparation for a planned housing development. Construction on homes began in 1981 and continued through 1991.

The Countryside CDP covers about 2.6 square miles (6.7 km^{2}) and homes in Countryside have a 20165 (Potomac Falls or Sterling) ZIP code.

The majority of the homes in Countryside were built by Pulte Homes and are of the colonial architectural style. Most of the single-family homes have two stories and a basement. CountrySide Proprietary is the community's homeowners association.

== Demographics ==
Historical population
Census	Pop.	Note	%±
2010	10,072		—
2020	10,418		3.4%
U.S. Decennial Census; 2010 2020

=== 2020 census ===
As of the 2020 census, Countryside had a population of 10,418. The median age was 36.5 years. 24.7% of residents were under the age of 18 and 10.9% of residents were 65 years of age or older.

For every 100 females there were 95.5 males, and for every 100 females age 18 and over there were 93.1 males age 18 and over.

100.0% of residents lived in urban areas, while 0.0% lived in rural areas.

There were 3,594 households in Countryside, of which 39.6% had children under the age of 18 living in them. Of all households, 60.2% were married-couple households, 13.8% were households with a male householder and no spouse or partner present, and 20.4% were households with a female householder and no spouse or partner present. About 18.6% of all households were made up of individuals and 5.5% had someone living alone who was 65 years of age or older.

There were 3,711 housing units, of which 3.2% were vacant. The homeowner vacancy rate was 0.3% and the rental vacancy rate was 7.7%.

Racial composition as of the 2020 census
Race	Number	Percent
White	6,066	58.2%
Black or African American	799	7.7%
American Indian and Alaska Native	38	0.4%
Asian	1,106	10.6%
Native Hawaiian and Other Pacific Islander	3	0.0%
Some other race	1,006	9.7%
Two or more races	1,400	13.4%
Hispanic or Latino (of any race)	2,082	20.0%

=== 2010 census ===
Countryside was first listed as a census designated place in the 2010 U.S. census.

== Recreation and natural features ==
The community contains an extensive network of paved paths that wind through the wooded neighborhoods. It also contains three swimming pools. A network of smaller hiking trails branch off the main trail and are used for hiking, mountain biking, nature-watching and jogging. Some of the trails were developed by Eagle Scouts, others gradually by hikers; still others pre-date Countryside itself.

Horsepen Run drains the community, flowing north into the Potomac River. Countryside Lake is also accessible within the community for fishing and light water recreation at users' risk.

Several parks and recreational facilities are accessible to the northern border of the community, including Horsepen Run Countryside Nature Preserve, Algonkian Regional Park (which features Algonkian Golf Course), Potomac Lake Sportsplex, and Volcano Island Waterpark. The Algonkian Regional Park boat ramp provides access to the Potomac River for water sports. Several playgrounds are also accessible within the community.

== Schools ==
Countryside students attend Countryside Elementary School, Algonkian Elementary School, Horizon Elementary School, River Bend Middle School, and Potomac Falls High School.
