= Thomas Balch (historian) =

American historian (1821–1877)

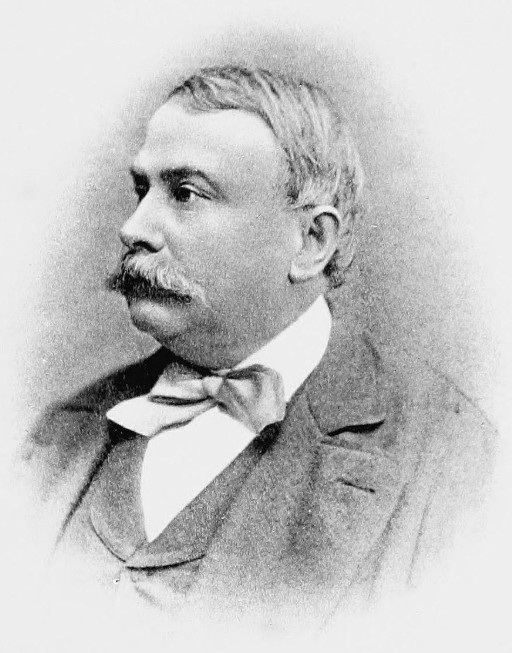
- Born: July 23, 1821; Leesburg, Virginia, U.S.
- Died: March 29, 1877 (aged 55); Philadelphia, Pennsylvania, U.S.
- Occupation: Historian
- Known for: Work on the American Revolutionary War
- Spouse: Emily Swift Balch

Thomas Balch (Leesburg, Virginia, July 23, 1821 – Philadelphia, March 29, 1877) was an American historian, best known for his work on the American Revolutionary War, originally written in French and later translated into English as The French in America during the War of Independence of the United States, 1777-1783.

Balch was the son of Lewis Penn Witherspoon Balch (1787–1868) and grandson of Stephen Bloomer Balch.

Balch studied at Columbia College from 1838 to 1841. He left without graduating to work at the law office of Stephen Cambreling in New York City, where he began to study law. Balch was admitted to the New York bar in 1845. Relocating to Philadelphia, Pennsylvania at the end of 1849, he was admitted to the Philadelphia bar in 1850.

He was married to Emily Swift Balch of Philadelphia in 1852. Mrs. Balch was a member of the Acorn Club of Philadelphia, and the Colonial Dames of America. Thomas and Emily Balch had three sons and a daughter.

In 1854, Balch was elected to the Philadelphia common council, serving for two years. In 1855, he was admitted as a counsellor before the Supreme Court of the United States. From 1859 to 1873, Balch lived in Europe and resided with his family primarily in Paris. In 1861, he briefly served as U.S. consul in Paris.

Thomas Balch has been called the "father of international arbitration" for his work in popularizing this peaceful mechanism of international dispute resolution (see Thomas Balch Library).

Thomas Balch died March 29, 1877, in Philadelphia, and was buried at the Old Trinity Church.

== Thomas Balch Library ==
In 1922, a library was constructed in Leesburg, Virginia, as a memorial to Thomas Balch, a Leesburg native, and was named "The Thomas Balch Library". Thomas Willing Balch (1866–1927) and Edwin Swift Balch (1856–1927), sons of Thomas Balch, originally endowed the subscription library.

== Bibliography ==
- Balch, Thomas, and Thomas Willing Balch. International Courts of Arbitration. Philadelphia: Allen, Lane and Scott, 1915.
- Balch, Thomas, Thomas Willing Balch, Edwin Swift Balch, and Elise Willing Balch. The French in America During the War of Independence of the United States, 1777-1783. Philadelphia: Porter & Coates, 1891.
- Balch, Thomas. Les Français en Amérique pendant la guerre de l'indépendance des États-Unis 1777-1783. This file was produced from images generously made available by gallica (Bibliothèque Nationale de France).
- Balch, Thomas, and Daniel McCurtin. Papers Relating Chiefly to the Maryland Line During the Revolution. Philadelphia: Seventy-Six Society, 1857.
- Balch, Thomas, and Edward Shippen. Letters and Papers Relating Chiefly to the Provincial History of Pennsylvania: With Some Notices of the Writers. Philadelphia: Crissy and Markley, Printers, 1855.
- Balch, Thomas, and Thomas Willing Balch. Free Coinage and a Self-Adjusting Ratio; A Paper Read Before the Philadelphia Social Science Association, February 23, 1877. Philadelphia: Press of Allen, Lane and Scott, 1908.
- Balch, Thomas. Calvinism and American Independence. Richmond, Va: s.n, 1876.
- Balch, Thomas. 1877. "Dr. William Shippen, the Elder". Pennsylvania Magazine of History and Biography. 24: 212-216.
- Balch, Thomas. The Alabama Arbitration. Philadelphia: Allen. Lanes Scott, 1900.
- Thomas Balch Library. The Thomas Balch Chronicle. Leesburg, VA: Thomas Balch Library, 1996.
