= Algonkian Regional Park =

Park in Loudoun County, Virginia, United States

Coordinates: 39.05844°N 77.37915°W

Algonkian Regional Park is located on the Potomac River in Sterling, Virginia at Cascades, Virginia. The 838-acre park is owned and operated by the Northern Virginia Regional Park Authority (NOVA Parks) and contains open fields, picnic shelters, rental cottages, an event center for weddings and meetings, a boat launch with access to the Potomac River, the Volcano Island water park open from May to September, and an 18-hole golf course. The park is bisected by the Potomac Heritage Trail.

== History ==
NOVA Parks purchased Algonkian from the Potomac Electric Power Company (Pepco) in 1975, dedicating the new facility in 1976. Pepco had constructed an 18-hole golf course on the facility as a getaway for its employees. NOVA Parks kept the course as the park's centerpiece, eventually adding vacation cottages in 1983, and an event center in 1984. The event center was fully remodeled in 2006.

== The Woodlands ==
Algonkian Regional Park is home to The Woodlands, a special event facility immediately adjacent to the park's golf course, constructed in 1984 and fully remodeled in 2006.

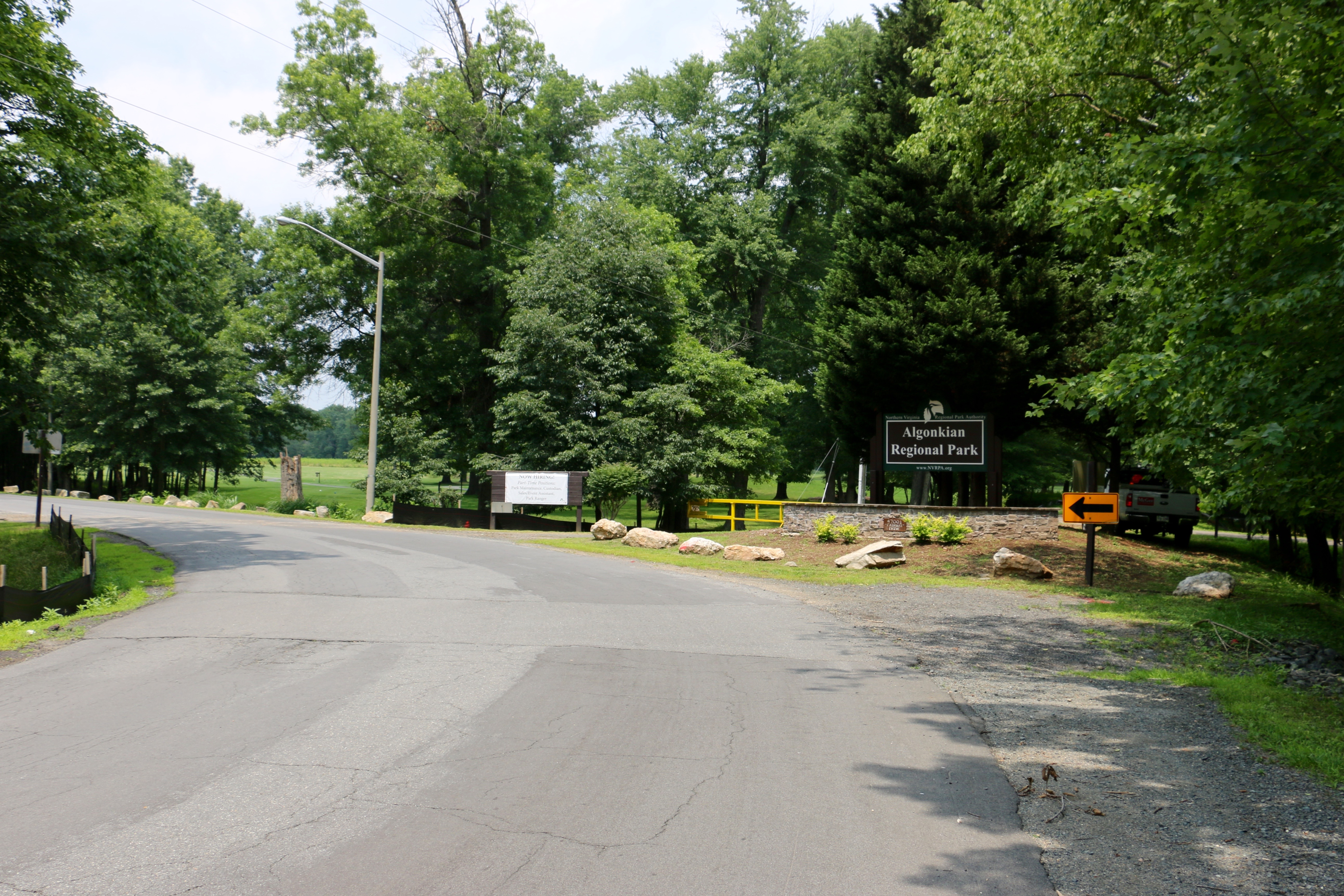
The entrance to Algonkian Regional Park from Cascades.

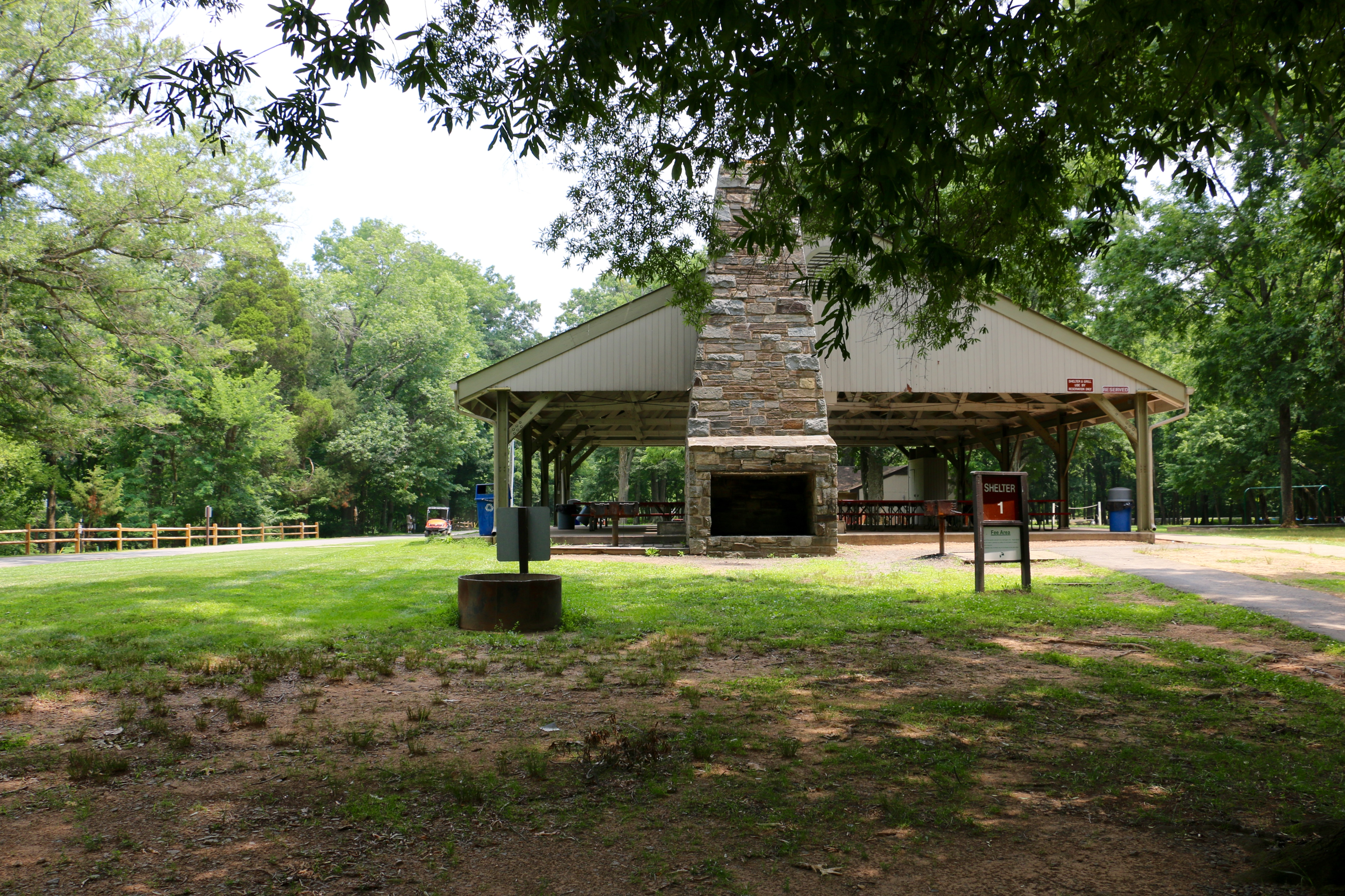
A picnic shelter at Algonkian Regional Park.

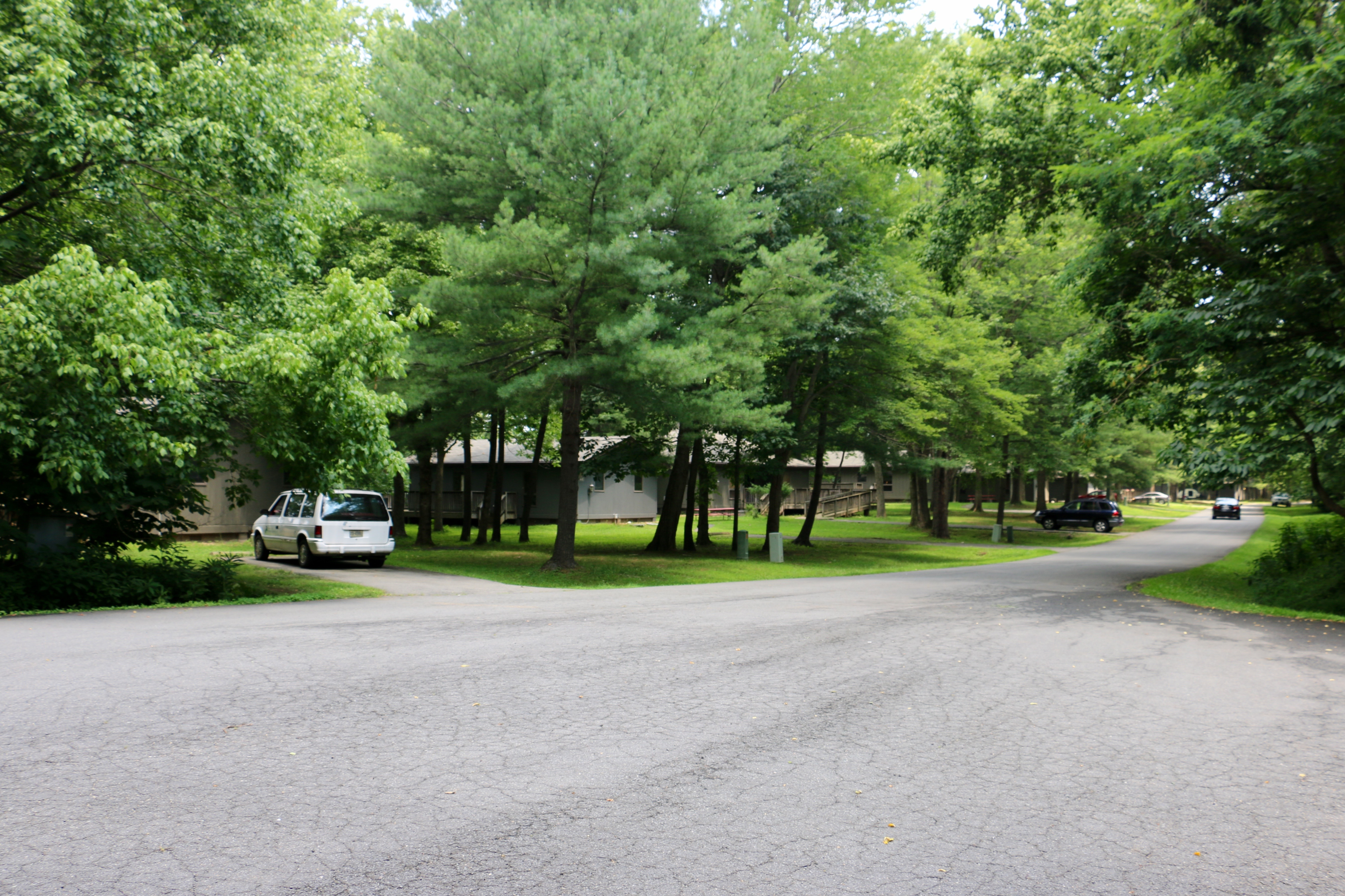
Rental cottages at Algonkian Regional Park.

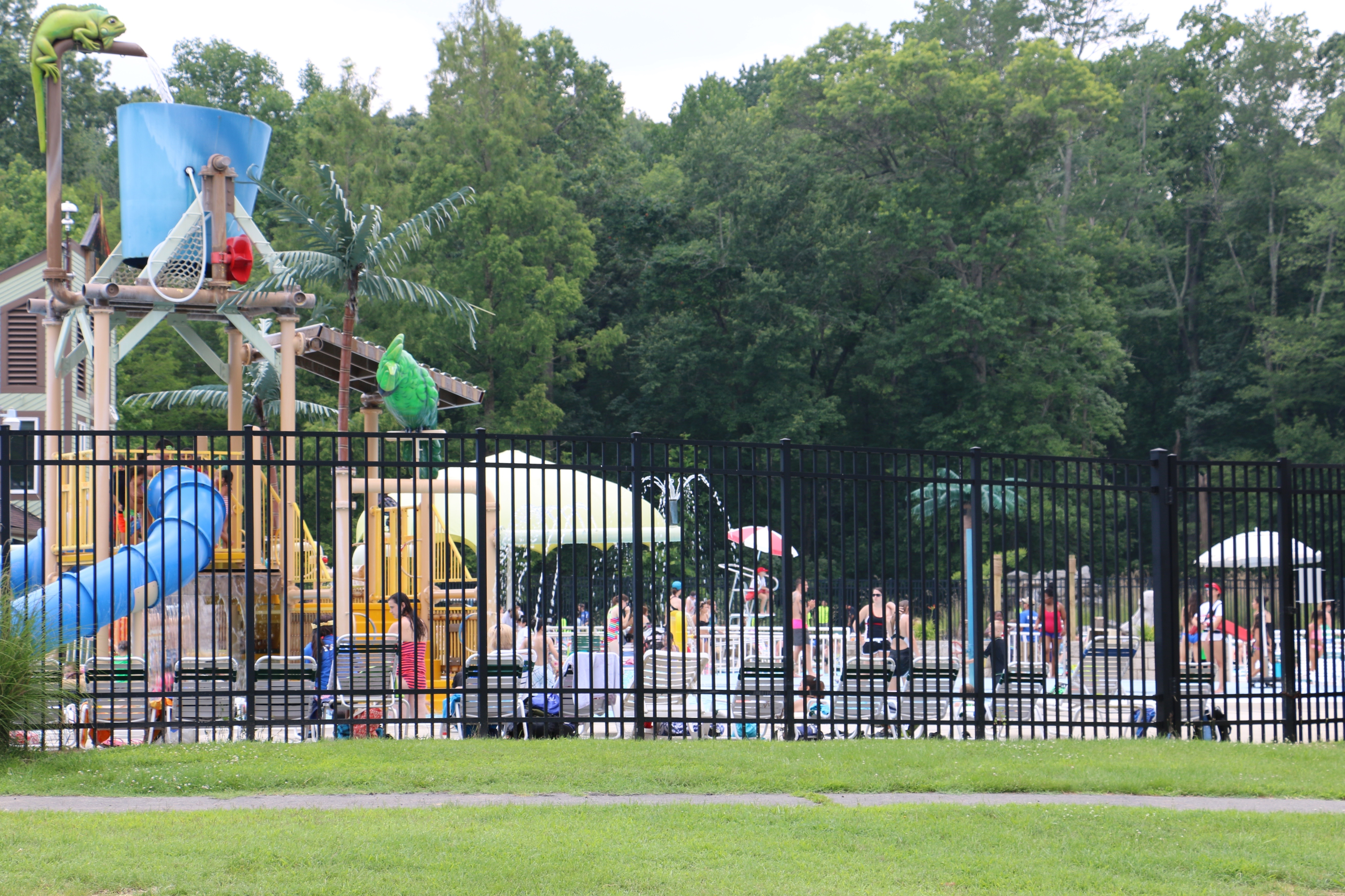
Volcano Island water park at Algonkian Regional Park.

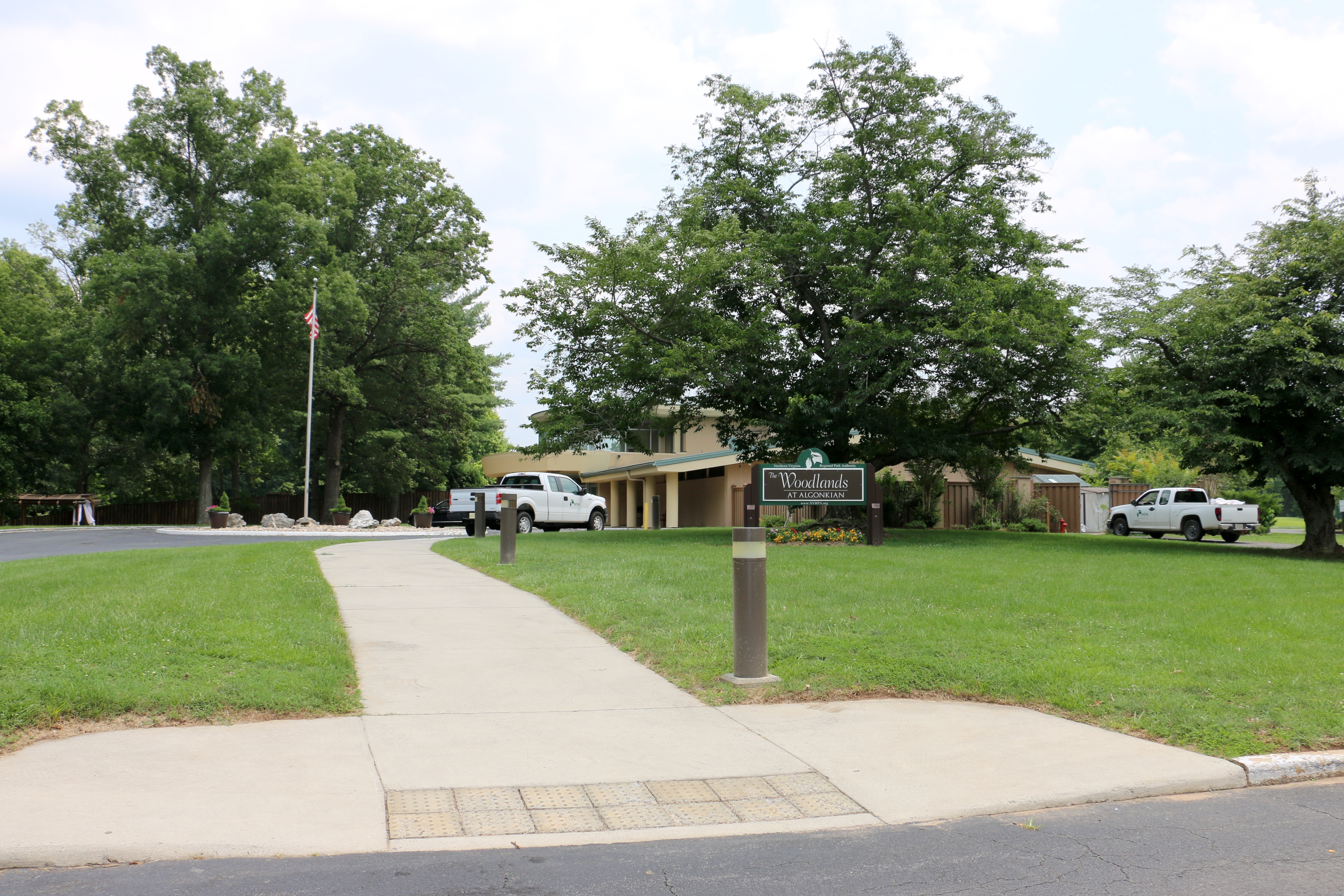
The Woodlands event center at Algonkian Regional Park.

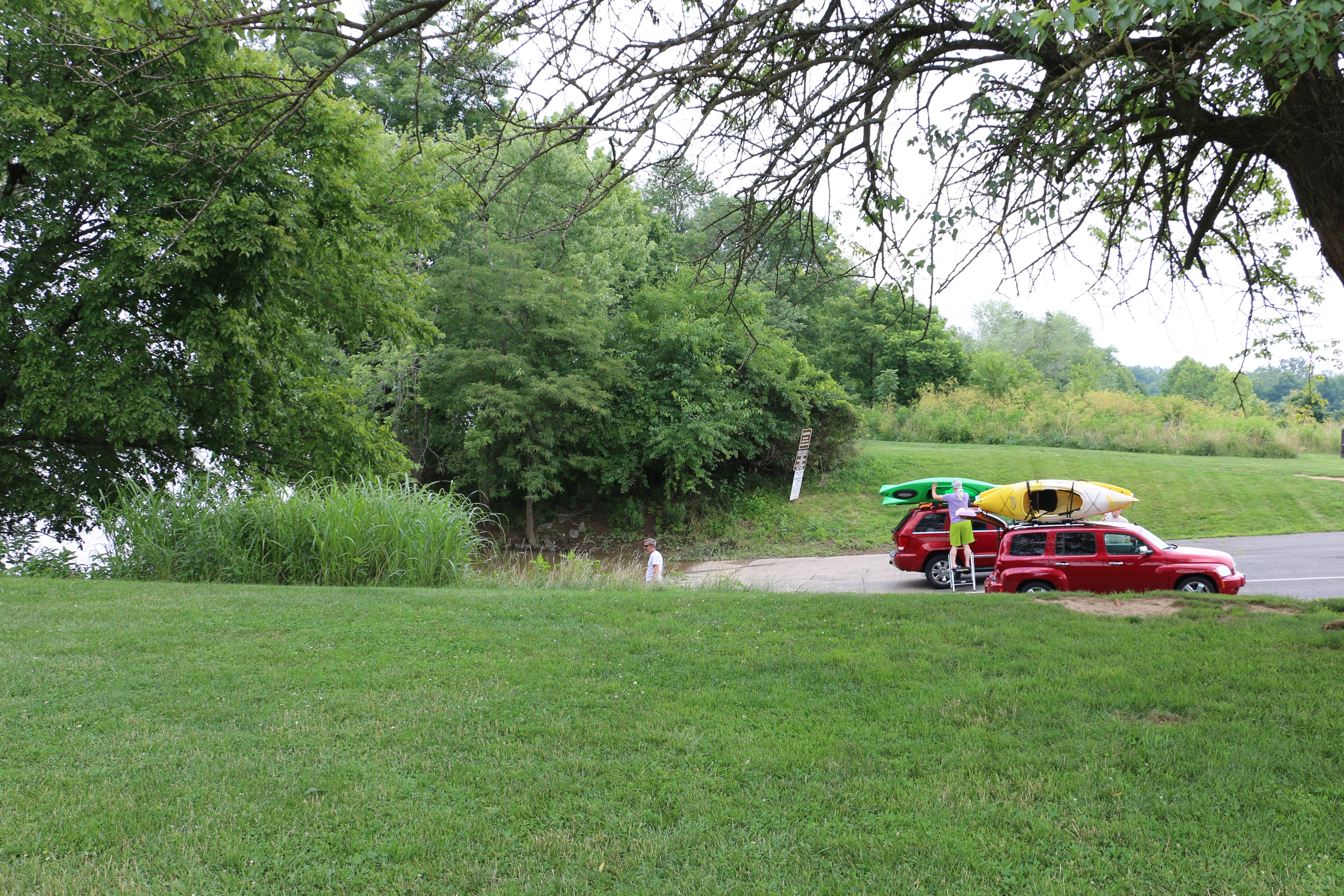
A boat ramp at Algonkian Regional Park.

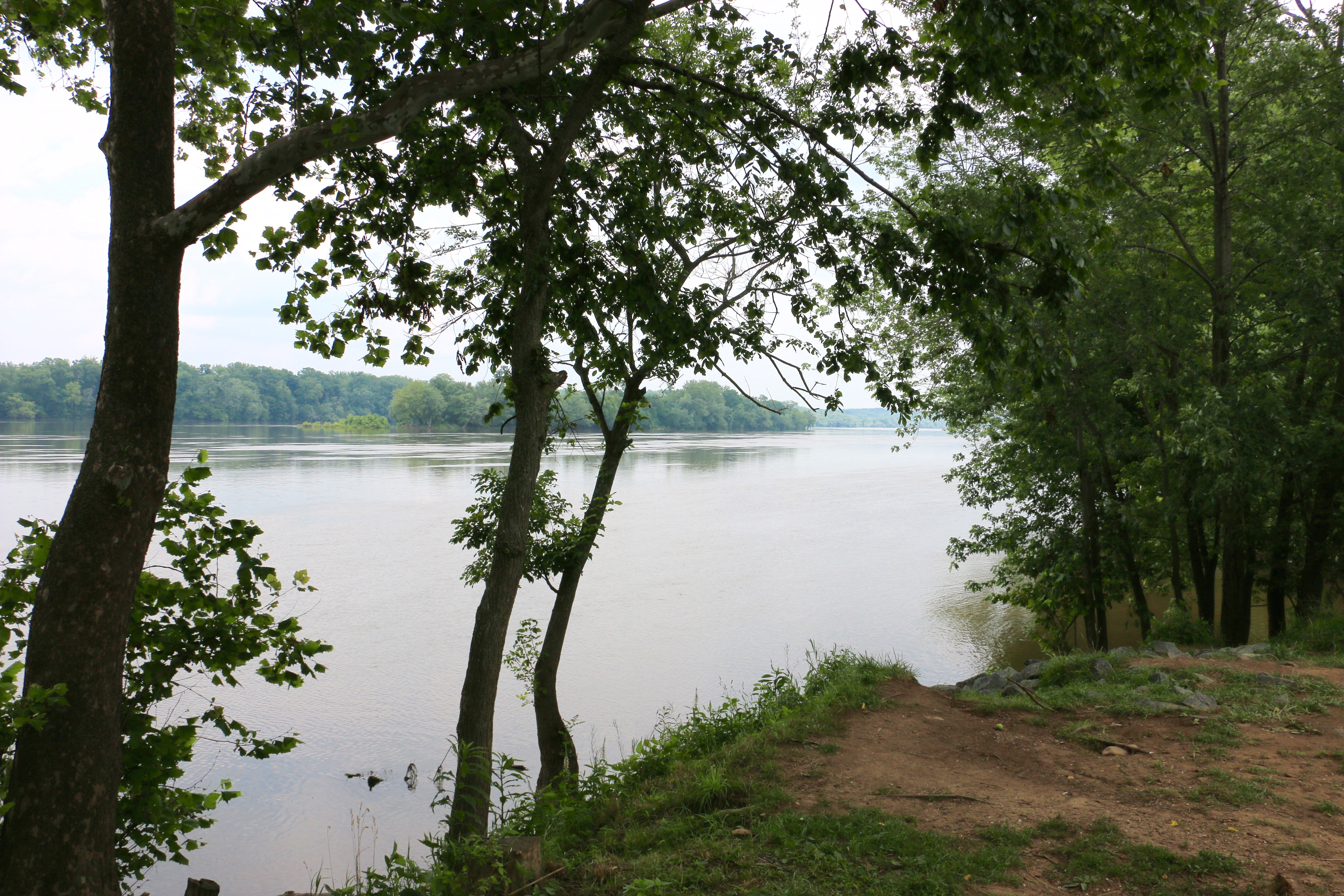
The Potomac River as seen from Algonkian Regional Park.
