= Michael L. Chapman =

Sheriff of Loudoun County, Virginia

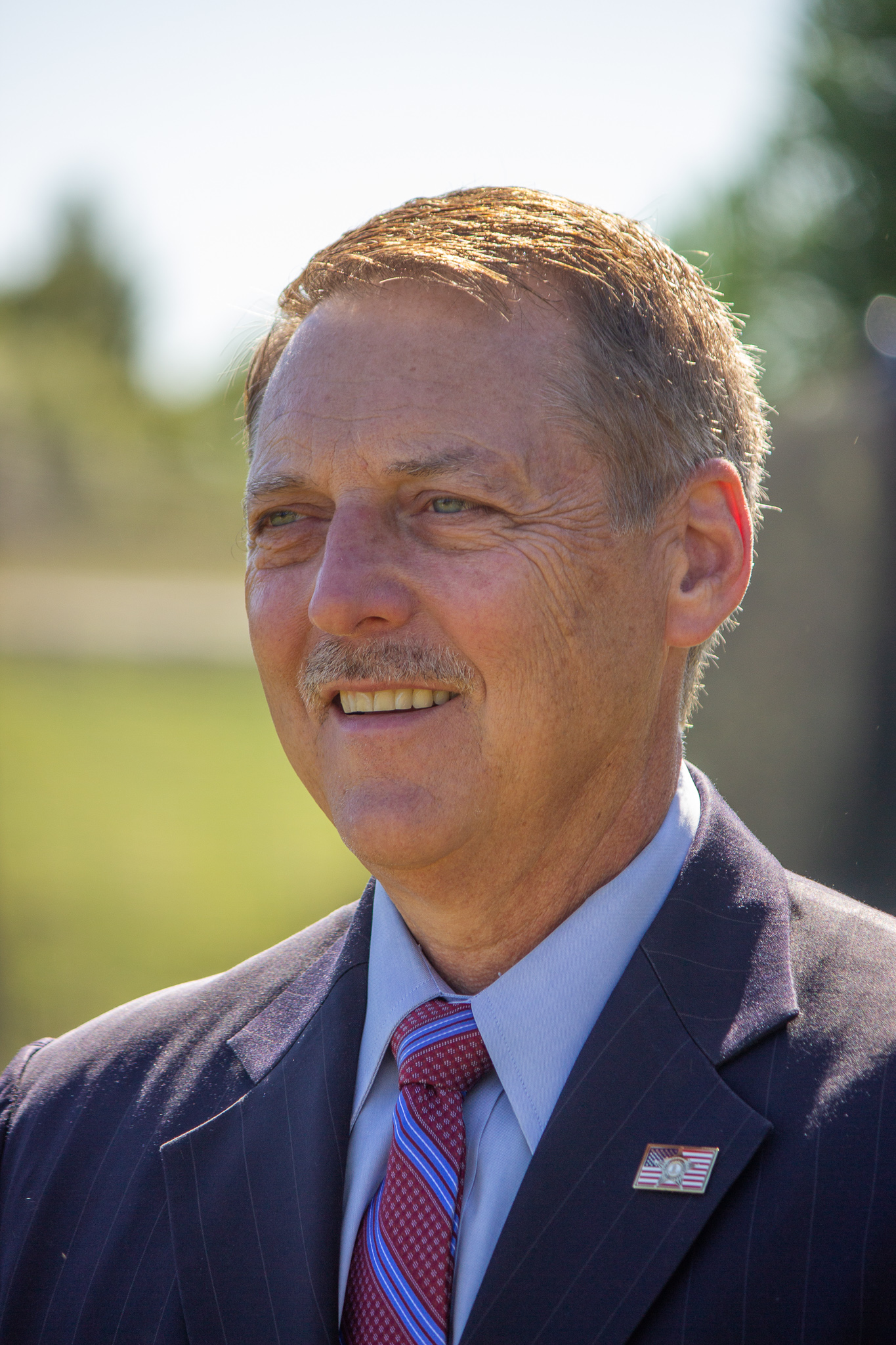

Sheriff of Loudoun County, Virginia
- Incumbent
- Assumed office January 1, 2012
- Preceded by: Stephen O'Neil Simpson

Personal details
- Born: October 8, 1957 (age 68) Washington, D.C., U.S.
- Party: Republican
- Spouse: Ann (Rafferty) Chapman
- Children: 6
- Education: Troy University; University of Maryland

Michael Louis Chapman is a law enforcement executive who is the current sheriff of Loudoun County, Virginia and administrator of the Loudoun County Sheriff's Office.

== Early life ==
Chapman was born in Washington, D.C. and began his law enforcement career with the Howard County Police Department (Maryland) in 1978. Chapman joined the Drug Enforcement Administration in 1985, and retired in 2008. Chapman was elected as Sheriff in Loudoun County, Virginia in November 2011, officially taking office on January 1, 2012. He has since been re-elected in 2015, 2019, and 2023, beginning his fourth term in January 2024.

Chapman has a Bachelor of Science in Business Management from the University of Maryland, and a Masters in Public Administration from Troy University, Alabama.

== Sheriff of Loudoun County ==
Chapman has prioritized initiatives in the areas of service, technology, efficiency and professionalism in all of his campaigns for election. Some of his most notable initiatives have been providing Crisis Intervention Team (CIT) training for all sworn deputies and dispatchers, collaborating with mental health providers to open the Crisis Intervention Team Assessment Center (CITAC), expanding the Drug Abuse Resistance Education (D.A.R.E) program to include elementary and middle schools, establishing the a multi-disciplinary team to reduce opioid issues, instituting a Cold Case Initiative to revitalize investigation of unsolved crimes, and expanding education and outreach programs to include internet safety, prescription and synthetic drug awareness, and the dangers of vaping.

In 2019, Chapman criticized Loudoun County Board of Supervisors Chairwoman Phyllis Randall's proposal to form a county police department, which would require a countywide referendum, saying it would remove the ability of the voters to elect their top law enforcement official, and relegate the Sheriff's Office to court and corrections duties. In 2021, Chapman, in documents released by Fox News, refused the Loudoun County Public Schools superintendent Scott Ziegler's request for additional security at school board meetings, including undercover deputies and special operations personnel, saying the request was "extraordinary" and that Ziegler failed "to provide any justification for such a manpower intensive request."

== National Positions ==
Chapman has held national-level leadership positions with the Major County Sheriff's of America, the National Sheriffs' Association, and the D.A.R.E. Executive Law Enforcement Advisory Board. In 2020, Chapman was appointed Chair of the Homeland Security Working Group on the Presidential Commission on Law Enforcement and the Administration of Justice

== Electoral history ==
2011 Loudoun County Sheriff General Election
Party	Candidate	Votes	%
Republican	Michael Louis Chapman	26,871	54.18
Independent	Stephen O'Neil Simpson (Incumbent)	17,522	35.33
Independent	Ronald Douglas Speakman	5,008	10.10
Write-in		195	00.39
Total votes		49,596	100.00

2015 Loudoun County Sheriff General Election
Party	Candidate	Votes	%
Republican	Michael Louis Chapman (Incumbent)	38,519	60.76
Independent	Stephen O'Neil Simpson	16,307	25.72
Democratic	Brian Peter Allman	8,288	13.08
Write-in		278	00.44
Total votes		63,392	100.00

2019 Loudoun County Sheriff General Election
Party	Candidate	Votes	%
Republican	Michael Louis Chapman (Incumbent)	61,671	54.64
Democratic	Justin Peter Hannah	50,947	45.13
Write-in		263	00.23
Total votes		112,881	100.00

2023 Loudoun County Sheriff General Election
Party	Candidate	Votes	%
Republican	Michael Louis Chapman (Incumbent)	73,132	53.40
Democratic	Craig Buckley	63,279	46.21
Write-in		538	00.39
Total votes		136,949	100.00

== Bibliography ==
- "Mental Health Training for Law Enforcement is Key to Handling Crises," The Hill
- "A Grave Injustice," Richmond Times-Dispatch
- "Responding to Mental Health Emergencies: Crisis Intervention Training in Loudoun County," The Police Chief
- "HOT Program Makes Opioid Crisis Go Cold," Sheriff & Deputy
- "This is the Meaningful, Effective Prison Reform the US Badly Needs," The Hill
- "Leadership in a Sheriff's Campaign," FBI-LEEDA Insighter
- "Let's Set the Record Straight," LoudounNow
- "STEP-UP and LEAD: A Guide for Dynamic, Innovative Leadership in Law Enforcement"
