= Loudoun County Sheriff's Office =

Sheriff's office for Loudoun County, Virginia

- Common name: Loudoun County Sheriff
- Abbreviation: LCSO

Agency overview
- Employees: 845
- Annual budget: $87.9 million

Jurisdictional structure
- Operations jurisdiction: Loudoun, Virginia, U.S.
- Map of Loudoun County Sheriff's Office's jurisdiction
- Area: 521 square miles (1,350 km^{2})
- Population: 420,959 (2020)
- Legal jurisdiction: Loudoun County
- Governing body: County (United States)
- Constituting instrument: Yes
- General nature: Local civilian police

Operational structure
- Headquarters: Leesburg, Virginia
- Deputies: 650
- Civilians: 199
- Agency executive: Michael L. Chapman, Sheriff

Website
- Official Website

The Loudoun County Sheriff's Office (LCSO) is the primary law enforcement agency within Loudoun County, Virginia and is the largest Sheriff's Office in the Commonwealth of Virginia. The agency is currently headed by Sheriff Michael L. Chapman who was last re-elected in 2023.

== Organization ==
LCSO is headed by the Sheriff and is divided into three bureaus, each led by a Chief Deputy with the rank of Lieutenant Colonel: Field Operations, Investigations, and Administrative and Corrections. Bureaus are made up of one or more divisions, sections, and units.

=== Rank Structure ===
Insignia	Title	Responsibilities / Information
	Sheriff	Commander of the department.
	Undersheriff (Colonel)	Second-in-command of the department; rank no longer used.
	Chief Deputy (Lieutenant Colonel)	Commands a Bureau.
	Major	Commands a Division.
	Captain	Commands a Station or assistant commander of a division.
	First Lieutenant	Assistant Commander of a Station or commander of a Section.
	Second Lieutenant	Commander of a Unit or a patrol shift.
	Sergeant	Supervisor within a Unit or patrol shift.
	Master Deputy Sheriff	Competitive senior rank requiring 12 years of service.
	Deputy First Class	Automatic promotion.
	Deputy Sheriff	Automatic promotion.
	Probationary Deputy	

== Potential Transition to Police Department ==
Shortly after being re-elected in 2019, Loudoun County Board of Supervisors Chairwoman Phyllis Randall proposed transitioning policing to a new police department while the sheriff would only be responsible for court related duties as is done in Prince William County and Fairfax County. Randall said the reason she proposed this is "I just simply don’t believe that law enforcement should be political." However, Sheriff Michael L. Chapman has stated that "[Loudoun Residents] are happy with the service they are getting, and it’s almost like, 'Why is there going to be a move to try and fix something that’s not broken?' it just seems to me to be a matter of just exercising power and control."

In 2012, the Board of Supervisors asked for a report about a potential transition and the commission responsible strongly recommended keeping the current system citing decreased state funding due to low crime rates and the idea that a police chief would be equally political when appointed.

To implement a police department a referendum is required and must be approved by voters in the county and enacted by the Virginia General Assembly.

In 2022, the Board of Supervisors announced that it would no longer seek the transition following an extensive report on the subject was released by the International Association of Chiefs of Police. The report recommended that the transition not go forward due to several reasons, including the cost (estimated to be between $200 and $300 million), the LCSO's very high satisfaction rates among county citizens, and the low crime rate of the county.

== List of sheriffs ==
List of sheriffs of Loudoun County, Virginia
Number	Portrait	Name	Term	Party	Electoral History
1st		Aeneas Campbell	1757 – Unknown	Independent	Appointed in 1757 at the creation of Loudoun County
Unknown		Samuel C. Luckett	June 1865 – May 1866	Democratic	Elected 1865 Election held 1866 despite four-year term
Unknown		Elijah Viers White	1867 – Unknown	Independent	Elected 1867
Unknown		Thomas W. Edwards	January 1, 1908 – December 31, 1923	Independent	Elected 1907 Re-elected 1911 Re-elected 1915 Re-elected 1919
Unknown		Eugene Adrian	1930s	Independent	Elected 1931
Unknown		S. Paul Alexander	January 1, 1940 – June 5, 1951	Democratic	Elected 1939 Re-elected 1943 Re-elected 1947 Resigned
Unknown		Carroll S. Hutchison	June 6, 1951 – December 31, 1951	Independent	Appointed
Unknown		Roger Franklin Powell	January 1, 1952 – December 31, 1959	Democratic	Elected in 1951 Re-elected in 1955 Lost re-election
Unknown		Maurice "Max" Dwyer	January 1, 1960 – December 31, 1963	Democratic	Elected in 1959
Unknown		Robert Willis Legard	January 1, 1964 – December 31, 1979	Democratic	Elected 1963 Re-elected 1967 Re-elected 1971 Re-elected 1975 Lost re-election
Unknown		Donald L. Lacy	January 1, 1980 – December 31, 1983	Republican	Elected in 1979 Retired
Unknown		John R. Isom	January 1, 1984 – December 31, 1995	Democratic	Elected in 1983 Re-elected in 1987 Re-elected in 1991 Lost re-election
Unknown		Stephen O'Neil Simpson	January 1, 1996 – December 31, 2011	Republican	Elected in 1995 Re-elected in 1999 Re-elected in 2003 Re-elected in 2007 Lost re-election
Unknown		Michael Louis Chapman	January 1, 2012 – present	Republican	Elected in 2011 Re-elected in 2015 Re-elected in 2019 Re-elected in 2023

== See also ==
- List of law enforcement agencies in Virginia
