= John Whitbeck =

American lawyer

Chairman of the Republican Party of Virginia
- In office January 2015 – July 2018
- Preceded by: Pat Mullins
- Succeeded by: Jack Wilson

Chairman of Virginia's 10th District Republican Committee
- In office 2013–2015

Personal details
- Party: Republican
- Education: Occidental College; GMU School of Law
- Website: www.wblaws.com

John Carroll Leon Whitbeck Jr. is an American attorney and Republican Party official from Loudoun County, Virginia. Whitbeck was the chairman of the Republican Party of Virginia from 2015 to 2018.

== Early life ==
Whitbeck is originally from California. He attended Occidental College where he played football as a center and earned a degree in politics. He obtained his J.D. degree from the George Mason University School of Law.

== Career ==
Whitbeck is the managing partner of the law firm WhitbeckBennett, a family law practice based in Leesburg, Virginia. He was an adjunct professor at George Mason Law School and also previously served as a substitute judge in District Court for five years. Whitbeck unsuccessfully ran for a seat in the Virginia House of Delegates in 2011 elections.

In 2013, he was the chairman of the Republican committee for the 10th congressional district when he was nominated by his party to run in the 2014 State Senate special elections for the 33rd district. He lost the election to Jennifer Wexton. In January 2015, he was elected chairman of the Republican Party of Virginia to succeed Pat Mullins.

Following the primary elections for the 2018 Senate election in Virginia, Whitbeck announced his resignation from the chairmanship of the Republican Party of Virginia.

In January 2019, Whitbeck announced that he would seek the office of Loudoun County Chair. Whitbeck lost the election for Loudoun Chair in November to Phyllis Randall.

== Electoral history ==
2011 Virginia House of Delegates, 10th District Republican Primary
Party	Candidate	Votes	%
Republican	Randy Minchew	1,193	40.50
Republican	John Whitbeck	1,106	37.54
Republican	Cara Michelle Townsend	647	21.96
Total votes		2,946	100.00

2014 Virginia Senate, 33rd District Special Election
Party	Candidate	Votes	%
Democratic	Jennifer Wexton	11,431	52.71
Republican	John Whitbeck	8,133	37.51
Independent	Joe T. May	2,117	09.76
Write-in		4	00.02
Total votes		21,685	100.00

2019 Loudoun County Board of Supervisors, Chair At-Large General Election
Party	Candidate	Votes	%
Democratic	Phyllis Randall (Incumbent)	63,230	56.68
Republican	John Whitbeck	43,673	39.14
Independent	Robert Joseph Ohneiser	4,494	04.03
Write-in		172	00.15
Total votes		111,569	100.00
