= Pat Mullins =

American politician

- Born: Dennis Patrick Mullins; August 22, 1937; St. Albans, West Virginia, U.S.
- Died: May 28, 2017 (aged 79); Hanover County, Virginia
- Education: Columbia University (BA); George Washington University (JD)
- Occupation: Insurance salesman
- Title: Republican Party of Virginia State Chairman
- Term: May 2, 2009 - June 2014
- Predecessor: Jeff Frederick
- Successor: John Whitbeck
- Political party: Republican

Dennis Patrick Mullins (August 22, 1937 – May 28, 2017) was an American insurance salesman and served as chairman of the Republican Party of Virginia.

== Personal life ==
Born in 1937 in St. Albans, West Virginia, Mullins graduated from St. Albans High School in 1955. He received his BA from Columbia University, majoring in economics, where he served as sports editor of the college daily newspaper, the Spectator, and a JD from George Washington University. He had four children with his wife Jackie, who died in 2010, Cathy, Steve, Mike and Debbie. He had 6 grandchildren, Greg Trotto, Jr., Sydney Trotto, Matthew Jackson "Moon" Mullins, Kiersten Mullins, Amanda Mullins, and Sabrina Mullins. He lived in Annandale, Virginia, which is in Fairfax County, from 1965 to 1997, and moved to Bumpass, Virginia, in Louisa County, where he lived until his death.

Professionally, Mullins was one of the top Equine Insurance Brokers in the United States. He achieved his CPCU status in insurance. He began his career with Victor Schinnerer and Companies in Washington, DC in the late 1950s. From there he worked at Marsh McLennan until the 1980s when he co-founded Best Insurance Company in Annandale, Virginia. He later founded Mullins and Associates, another insurance brokerage firm, which was acquired by the Rhulen Agency out of New York. Markel Insurance Company of Richmond, Virginia acquired the Equine Insurance division of the Rhulen Agency and Pat went to work with Markel in 1992. He continued working at Markel Corporation until his death in 2017.

Mullins was active in the community having served as head of many different organizations including: Annandale Rotary Club, Annandale Chamber of Commerce, Wakefield Forest Elementary PTA, Fairfax County Council of PTAs, Turnpike Basketball League, Annandale/Springfield National Little League, District Governor of Rotary, the Annandale United Methodist Church Methodist Youth Fellowship (MYF), the National Association of Riding for the Handicapped (now Path International), and many other groups.

== Political career ==
Mullins unsuccessfully ran for a position on the Fairfax County Board of Supervisors in 1979 and 1987. He was elected Chairman of the Fairfax County Republican Committee in 1990, winning over 60% in a convention of over 1,000 delegates at Lake Braddock High School. He served as chairman of the Fairfax County Republican Committee from 1990 to 1996. After moving to Louisa County, he served as the chairman of the Louisa County Republican Committee from 2008 to 2009, after which he was elected as chair of the Republican Party of Virginia. He served as Chairman of the Republican Party of Virginia until 2014.

During his tenure as Chairman of the Fairfax County Republican Committee, the Republican Party of Fairfax won a majority on the Fairfax County Board of Supervisors for the first time in the history of the county during the 1991 elections.

Mullins was elected as temporary party chairman on May 2, 2009, to replace Jeff Frederick, who had been fired as chairman in April. He was elected as full-time chairman to serve the remainder of Frederick's term on May 30, 2009, with 70% of the vote at the convention of 6,817 delegates at the Richmond Coliseum, and was re-elected in 2012 without opposition.

During his tenure as Chairman of the Republican Party of Virginia, the Republican Party won all three statewide offices—Governor, Lieutenant Governor, and Attorney General—in the 2009 elections, which was the first time that had happened in the history of the Commonwealth of Virginia. In the 2010 elections, the Republican Party nominated candidates for Congress that defeated three different Democratic incumbents. In the 2011 elections, the Republican Party gained parity in the State Senate with a 20–20 split, which saw many tie votes broken by the Republican Lieutenant Governor. This was the first time in Virginia history that the Republican Party controlled all three of the top state offices, with a majority in the House and a working majority in the State Senate.

== Death ==
Mullins died on May 28, 2017, in a car accident in Hanover County, Virginia. He was 79 years old and lived in Bumpass, Virginia.
