= Juli Briskman =

American politician and journalist

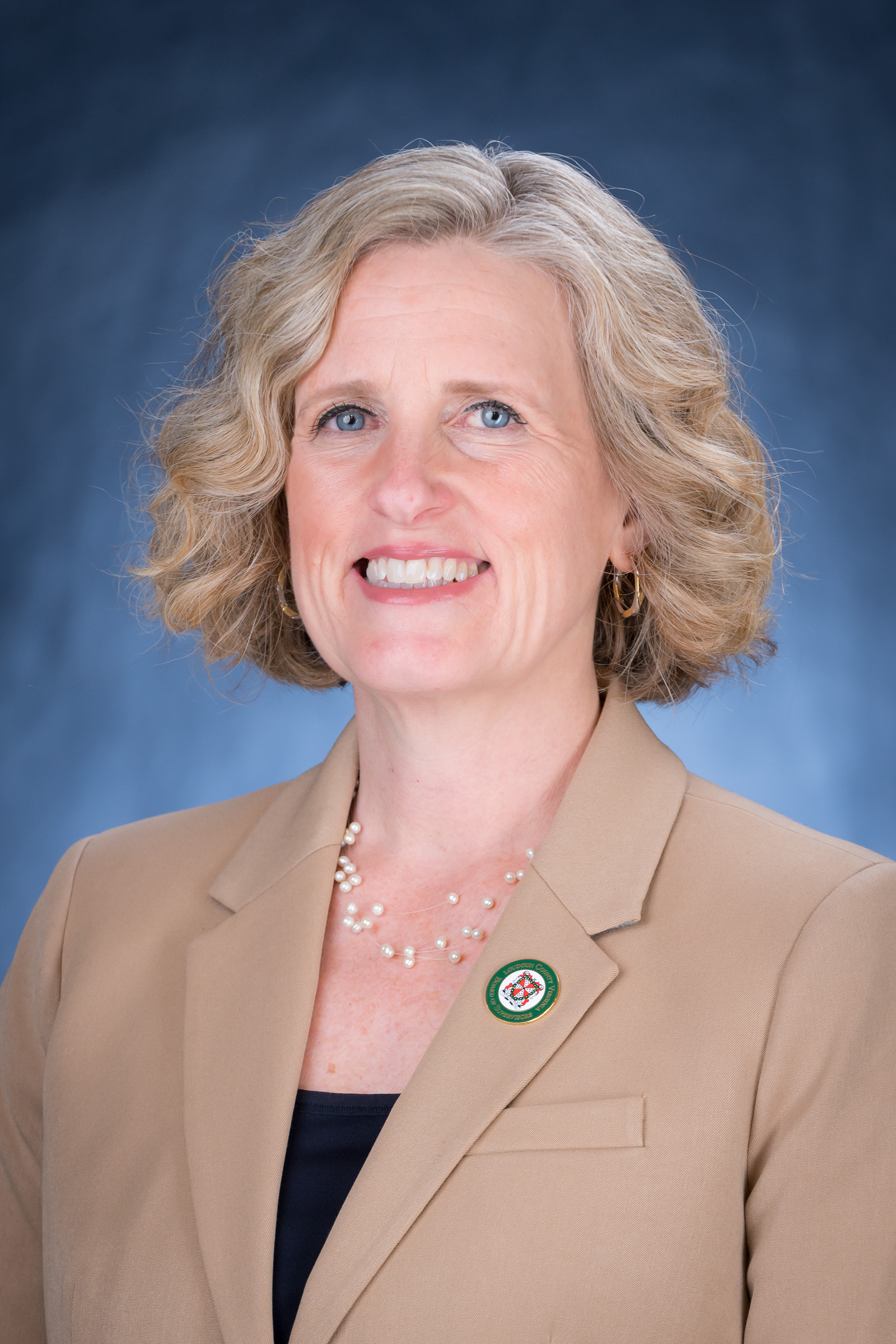
- Juli Briskman

Member of the Loudoun County Board of Supervisors from the Algonkian District
- Incumbent
- Assumed office January 1, 2020
- Preceded by: Suzanne Volpe

Personal details
- Born: Juli Ellyn Klyce; March 16, 1967 (age 59)
- Party: Democratic
- Children: 2
- Education: Ohio State University (BA); Johns Hopkins University (MBA)
- Occupation: Politician, marketing analyst, journalist
- Known for: Gesture towards American President Donald Trump
- Website: www.loudoun.gov/algonkian

Juli Ellyn Briskman (née Klyce; born March 16, 1967) is an American politician, marketing analyst, and journalist. She is a supervisor for the Algonkian District of Loudoun County, Virginia. Briskman garnered international attention for flipping off President Donald Trump in Sterling, Virginia, as he returned from a golfing trip in 2017. She once again received international attention when she was elected to the Loudoun County Board of Supervisors in 2019.

== Early life ==
Briskman is originally from the Columbus, Ohio, metropolitan area and graduated from Worthington High School, where she was a field hockey athlete, in 1985. She graduated from Ohio State University in 1990, with a degree in journalism. She worked for the school newspaper, The Lantern. She received an MBA in marketing from Johns Hopkins University's Carey Business School in 1998.

== Career ==
Briskman interned for the Kuwait Times, where she made news for escaping to Saudi Arabia as the Iraqis invaded Kuwait. She worked at the U.S. Department of State as a community liaison officer for eight years, including at embassies in Riga, Latvia and Almaty, Kazakhstan. After leaving the State Department, she was in the admissions and marketing departments at Village Green Day School. She was a marketing analyst at several companies until the beginning of 2019, including as chief marketing officer of a health-care company in Chantilly, Virginia. She received a certificate in digital marketing from Georgetown University in 2017.

=== Middle finger controversy ===
On October 28, 2017, Briskman was riding her bike in Sterling, Virginia, when the Trump motorcade passed her as he departed Trump National Golf Club Washington, D.C. She flipped her middle finger as Trump rode by, which was caught on camera by a photographer. Briskman had worked as a marketing analyst for Akima, a government contractor, for eight months until she was fired for using the viral photo as her Facebook cover photo and her Twitter profile picture. She sued for wrongful termination as another employee also had "obscene content," which it was her job to flag, on his social media accounts, but was allowed to remove it. Her claim was not upheld in court because Virginia's at-will employment laws do not cover free speech, but the judge granted Briskman the full severance pay she was owed.

=== 2019 election ===
In 2019, Briskman, a Democrat, was elected to the Algonkian District seat of the Loudoun County Board of Supervisors, defeating eight-year incumbent Suzanne M. Volpe. She described herself as running on policies such as environmentalism, education, and women's rights, rather than the notice she received for flipping off the president. The Washington Post described her victory as "fabulous revenge," and Gerard Baker of London's The Times noted that it highlighted President Trump's perceived issues with suburban American women.

She was re-elected in 2023.

== Personal life ==
Briskman moved to Loudoun County in the early 2000s. She is the mother of two with her ex-husband. Briskman has also worked part-time as a yoga instructor.
