= Phyllis Randall =

Virginia politician and mental-health therapist

Phyllis J. Randall
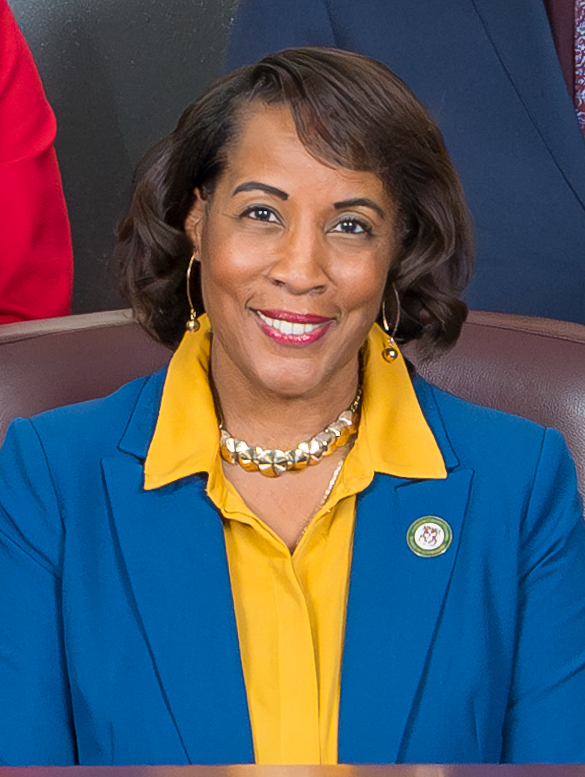

Chair At-Large of the Loudoun County Board of Supervisors
- Incumbent
- Assumed office January 1, 2016
- Preceded by: Scott York

Personal details
- Born: Phyllis Joycelyn Randall; 1964 or 1965 Denver, Colorado
- Party: Democratic
- Children: 2
- Profession: Mental-health therapist

Phyllis Joycelyn Randall (born 1964 or 1965) is an American politician and mental-health therapist. A Democrat, she is chair at-large of the Loudoun County Board of Supervisors, Virginia, and the first African-American woman to chair a county board in Virginia. She was also the defendant in a notable 2019 lawsuit, Davison v. Randall, in which the United States Court of Appeals for the Fourth Circuit ruled that the First Amendment precludes government officials from blocking constituents on official government social media accounts.

== Biography ==
Randall grew up in Denver and moved to Ashburn, Virginia from Colorado in the early 1990s. She began her career as a mental health counselor, working with juvenile and adult offenders both in and outside of incarceration. Governor Tim Kaine, a Democrat, appointed her chair of the Virginia Fair Housing Board, a role she continued in under Republican Governor Bob McDonnell. Democratic Governor Terry McAuliffe appointed her chair of the State Board of Corrections.

Randall ran unsuccessfully for Loudoun County school board in 2003 and for district supervisor in 2007 before being elected chair at-large in 2015. In the four-way race that year, Randall defeated the incumbent Scott York as well as the other challengers, winning with 37% of the vote. Her election made Randall the first African American woman in Virginia’s history to be an elected chair of a county board, as well as becoming one of the first two African Americans to serve on the Loudoun County Board of Supervisors, along with Sterling District Supervisor Koran Saines.

She was re-elected in 2019, overseeing a growing jurisdiction which by 2019 had 413,000 residents. With 56% of the vote, she defeated Republican John Whitbeck, despite Whitbeck fundraising more than $950,000 to Randall’s $616,000 in the last reporting period before the election.

Also in 2019, Randall was the defendant in a lawsuit, Davison v. Randall, that established public officials may not block constituents on government social media accounts, as a matter of First Amendment rights. The United States Court of Appeals for the Fourth Circuit decision found that Randall had converted her Facebook page into a public forum by inviting, in a post she wrote, “ANY Loudoun citizen on ANY issues, request, criticism, complement or just your thoughts” as well as encouraging constituents to use her “county Facebook page” to contact her. Consequently, the court said, when she deleted a critical post alleging corruption by the county board and blocked its author, she violated the poster’s First Amendment rights. Randall tried to justify her actions by claiming her Facebook page was "private" despite using her government-paid chief of staff to administer the page. The case drew particular attention because at the time US President Donald Trump was also blocking critics on social media.

Randall lives in Lansdowne, Virginia. She is married with two children.

== Electoral history ==
2003 Loudoun County School Board, Broad Run District General Election
Party	Candidate	Votes	%
Independent	Bob J. Ohneiser	1,890	43.94
Independent	Phyllis J. Randall	1,580	36.74
Independent	Chalice V. Radakovich	811	18.86
Write-in		20	00.46
Total votes		4,301	100.00

2007 Loudoun County Board of Supervisors, Broad Run District General Election
Party	Candidate	Votes	%
Republican	Lori L. Waters (Incumbent)	3,880	47.93
Democratic	Phyllis J. Randall	2,376	29.35
Independent	Jack W. Ryan Jr.	1,766	21.81
Write-in		74	00.91
Total votes		8,096	100.00

2015 Loudoun County Board of Supervisors, Chair At-Large General Election
Party	Candidate	Votes	%
Democratic	Phyllis Joycelyn Randall	24,633	37.54
Independent	Scott Kiefer York (Incumbent)	19,902	30.33
Republican	Charles Lewis King	18,934	28.85
Independent	Thomas Edward Bellanca	1,974	03.01
Write-in		176	00.27
Total votes		65,619	100.00

2019 Loudoun County Board of Supervisors, Chair At-Large General Election
Party	Candidate	Votes	%
Democratic	Phyllis Joycelyn Randall (Incumbent)	63,230	56.68
Republican	John Carroll Leon Whitbeck Jr.	43,673	39.14
Independent	Robert Joseph Ohneiser	4,494	04.03
Write-in		172	00.15
Total votes		111,569	100.00

2023 Loudoun County Board of Supervisors, Chair At-Large General Election
Party	Candidate	Votes	%
Democratic	Phyllis Joycelyn Randall (Incumbent)	66,135	48.65
Republican	Gary L. Katz	57,873	42.57
Independent	Sam R. Kroiz	11,362	08.36
Write-in		567	00.42
Total votes		135,937	100.00
