= Loudoun County Board of Supervisors =

Local government body in Virginia, U.S.

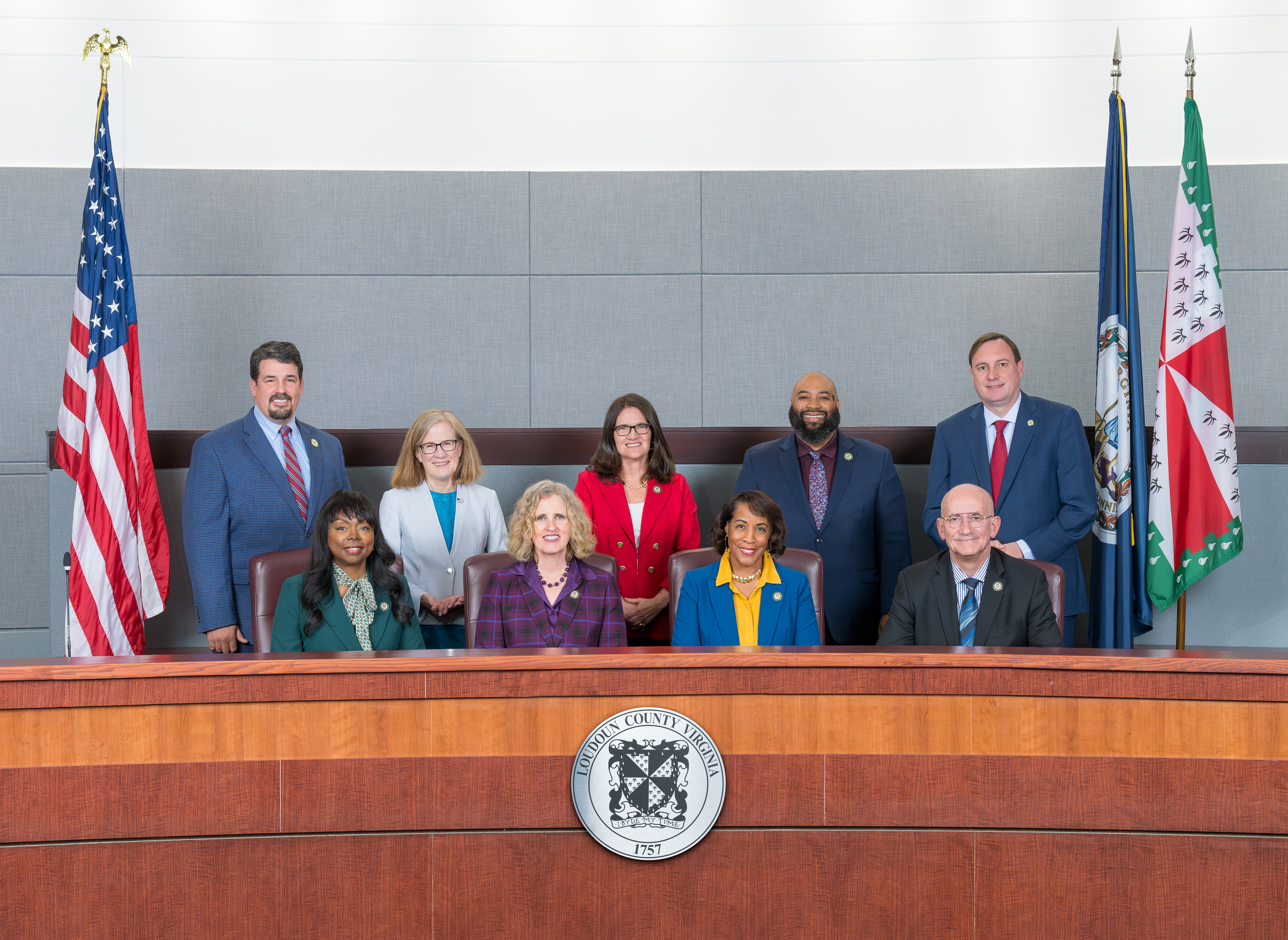

Type
- Type: Board of Supervisors of Loudoun County, Virginia

Leadership
- Chair: Phyllis Randall (D)
- Vice chair: Mike Turner (D)

Structure
- Seats: 9
- Political groups: Governing party: Democratic (7); Opposition: Republican (2)
- Committees: Finance/Government Operations and Economic Development Joint Board and School Board Transportation and Land Use
- Length of term: 4 years
- Salary: $96,609.77 (chair) $87,899.17 (vice chair) $80,539.59 (supervisor)

Elections
- Last election: November 7, 2023
- Next election: November 2, 2027

Meeting place
- Board Room; Loudoun County Government Center; 1 Harrison Street SE; Leesburg, Virginia 20175

Website
- http://Loudoun.gov/BOS

Loudoun County, Virginia is divided into eight magisterial districts: Algonkian, Ashburn, Broad Run, Catoctin, Dulles, Leesburg, Little River, and Sterling. The magisterial districts each elect one supervisor to the board of supervisors which governs Loudoun County. There is also a chair elected by the county at-large, bringing total board membership to nine. Board members serve concurrent, four-year terms. A vice chair is selected by the board from among its membership. The current chair is Phyllis Randall and the current vice chair is Mike Turner, the Ashburn District Supervisor. He has served as vice chair since January 2025. Salaries for the board term of 2024–2027 were set by the previous board in January 2023.

== Meeting schedule ==
The board of supervisors' meeting schedule is set forth in its Rules of Order. Business meetings typically occur twice monthly, beginning on the first Tuesday of the month at 5:00 p.m. The board holds one public hearing monthly, currently at 6:00 p.m. on the Wednesday that follows the first business meeting. The second business meeting occurs at 5:00 p.m. on the next Tuesday following the public hearing. The board's standing committees also usually meet monthly. The meetings are held at the Loudoun County Government Center, 1 Harrison Street, S.E. in Leesburg. The board's official meeting schedule is published in accordance with § 2.2-3707 of the Virginia Freedom of Information Act (FOIA) on the master calendar on the county's website.

== Actions ==
As empowered by the Code of Virginia, the board of supervisors typically takes action within its purview during each of its business meetings, public hearings, and standing committee meetings. The board has both administrative and legislative responsibilities, some of which are discharged in the role of the local governing body and some of which have derived from its function as an administrative subdivision of the state. The powers and duties of the board of supervisors include:

- Adopting the county budget (establishing appropriations and setting the tax rates);
- Approving and enforcing the county's comprehensive land use plan and related ordinances;
- Making and enforcing ordinances for public safety, sanitation, health and other regulations permitted by state laws; and
- Providing for the care and treatment of indigent and handicapped citizens.

Over time, a board of supervisors may take thousands of individual actions in open session by motion and majority vote during its meetings. The official actions of the Loudoun County Board of Supervisors are documented on the county's website, in the form of a copy teste, a "true copy" of the county's official record of Board actions, produced, signed, and published by the clerk on the county's website.

== Current membership ==
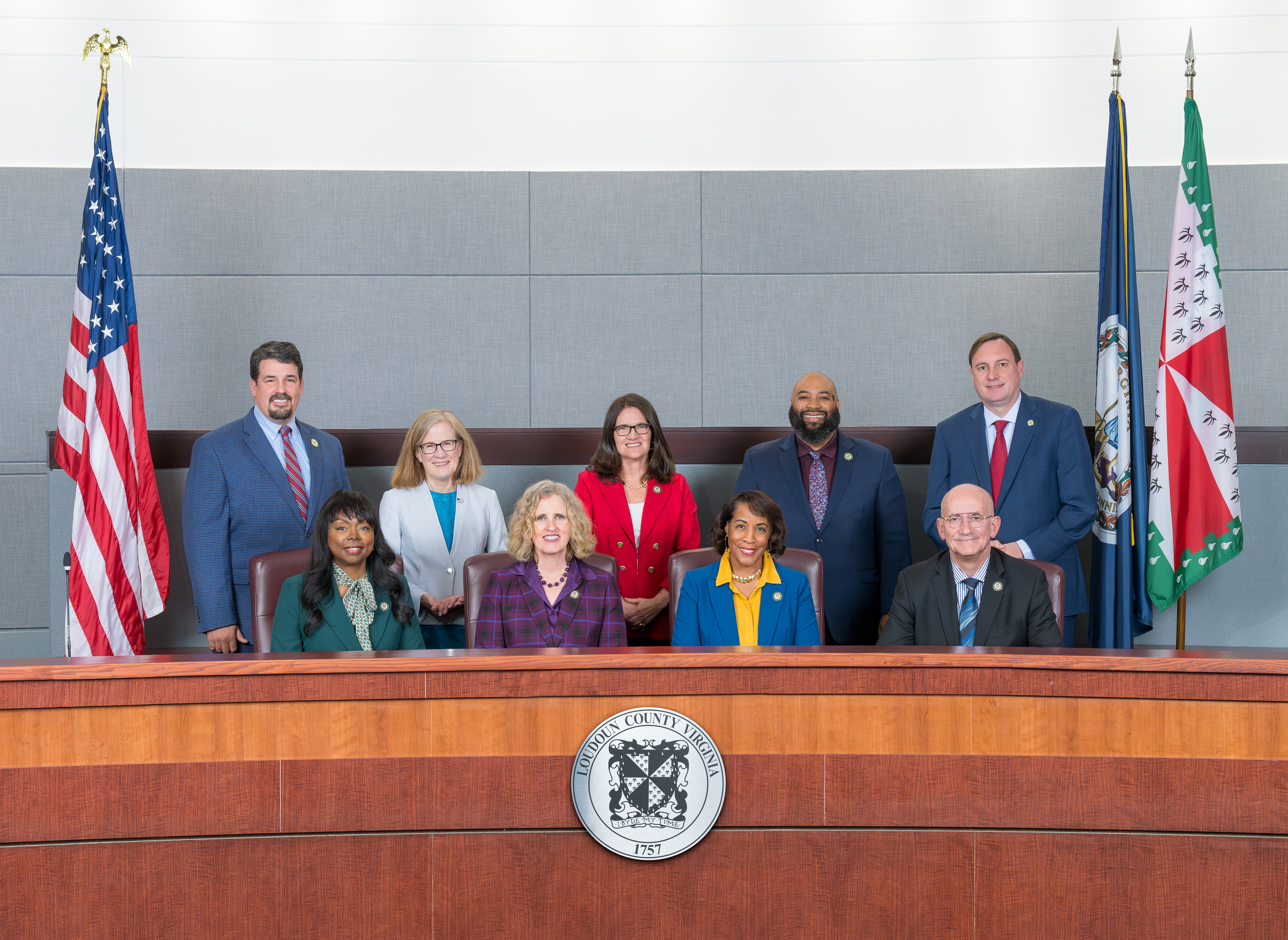
Top row (left to right): Caleb Kershner, Kristen Umstattd, Laura TeKrony, Koran Saines, Matt Letourneau. Bottom row (left to right): Sylvia Glass, Juli Briskman, Phyllis Randall, Mike Turner.

Loudoun County Board of Supervisors (January 1, 2024, to December 31, 2027) (elected on November 7, 2023)
Position	Name	Party	First elected	District
Chair	Phyllis Joycelyn Randall	Democratic	2015	At-large
Vice Chair	Michael Robert Turner	Democratic	2019	Ashburn
Supervisor	Juli Ellyn Briskman	Democratic	2019	Algonkian
Supervisor	Sylvia Russell Glass	Democratic	2019	Broad Run
Supervisor	Caleb Adriel Kershner	Republican	2019	Catoctin
Supervisor	Matthew Farrell Letourneau	Republican	2011	Dulles
Supervisor	Kristen Coles Umstattd	Democratic	2015	Leesburg
Supervisor	Laura A. TeKrony	Democratic	2023	Little River
Supervisor	Koran Terry Saines	Democratic	2015	Sterling

== Past memberships ==
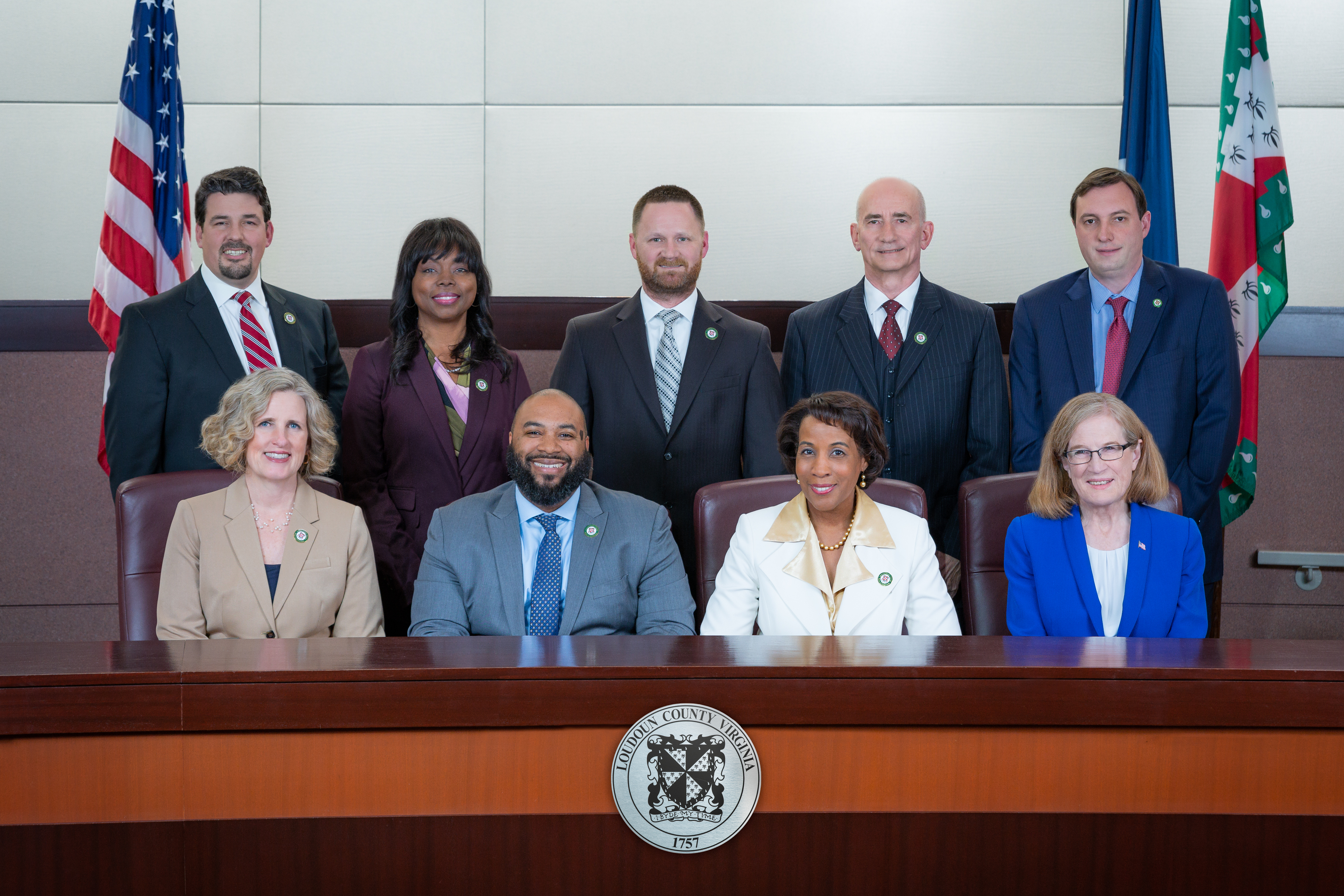
Top row (left to right): Caleb Kershner, Sylvia Glass, Tony Buffington, Mike Turner, Matt Letourneau. Bottom row (left to right): Juli Briskman, Koran Saines, Phyllis Randall, Kristen Umstattd.

Loudoun County Board of Supervisors (January 1, 2020, to December 31, 2023) (elected on November 5, 2019)
Position	Name	Party	First elected	District
Chair	Phyllis Joycelyn Randall	Democratic	2015	At-large
Vice chair	Koran Terry Saines	Democratic	2015	Sterling
Supervisor	Juli Ellyn Briskman	Democratic	2019	Algonkian
Supervisor	Michael Robert Turner	Democratic	2019	Ashburn
Supervisor	Tony Ray Buffington Jr.	Republican	2015	Blue Ridge
Supervisor	Sylvia Russell Glass	Democratic	2019	Broad Run
Supervisor	Caleb Adriel Kershner	Republican	2019	Catoctin
Supervisor	Matthew Farrell Letourneau	Republican	2011	Dulles
Supervisor	Kristen Coles Umstattd	Democratic	2015	Leesburg

Sterling District Supervisor Koran Saines served as vice chair from January 2020 to December 2023. Due to redistricting following the 2020 Census, the board opted to drop the Blue Ridge District name in favor of the Little River District name.

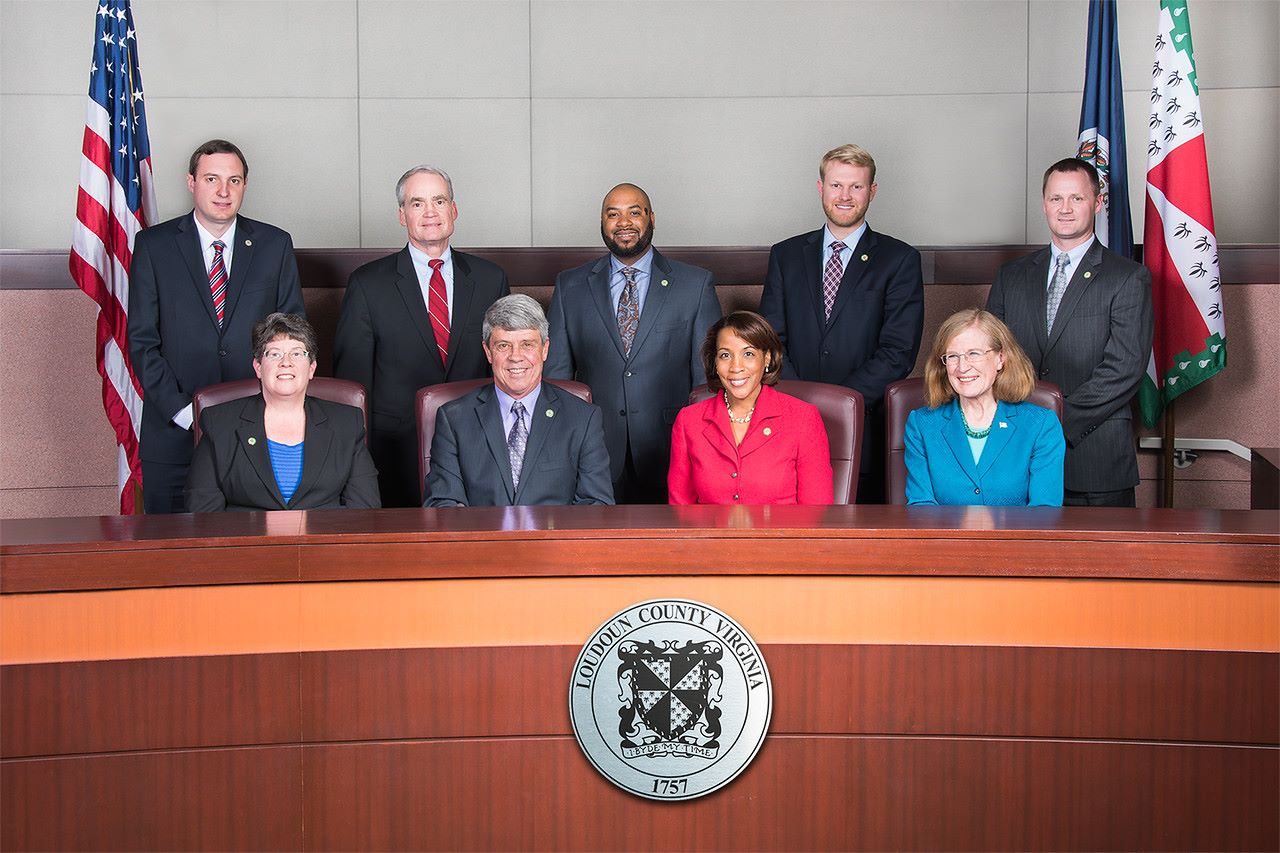
Top row (left to right): Matt Letourneau, Geary Higgins, Koran Saines, Ron Meyer, Tony Buffington. Bottom row (left to right): Suzanne Volpe, Ralph Buona, Phyllis Randall, Kristen Umstattd.

Loudoun County Board of Supervisors (January 1, 2016, to December 31, 2019) (elected on November 3, 2015)
Position	Name	Party	First elected	District
Chair	Phyllis Joycelyn Randall	Democratic	2015	At-large
Vice chair	Ralph Mark Buona	Republican	2011	Ashburn
Supervisor	Suzanne Marie Volpe	Republican	2011	Algonkian
Supervisor	Tony Ray Buffington Jr.	Republican	2015	Blue Ridge
Supervisor	Ronald Allen Meyer Jr.	Republican	2015	Broad Run
Supervisor	Geary Michael Higgins	Republican	2011	Catoctin
Supervisor	Matthew Farrell Letourneau	Republican	2011	Dulles
Supervisor	Kristen Coles Umstattd	Democratic	2015	Leesburg
Supervisor	Koran Terry Saines	Democratic	2015	Sterling

In November 2015, Loudoun voters made history when they elected their first two Black supervisors: Phyllis Randall (chair-at-large) and Koran Saines (Sterling). They also elected their youngest-ever supervisor, Broad Run District Supervisor Ron Meyer, who was 26 at the time of his election. Ashburn District Supervisor, Ralph Buona, served as vice chair all four years of the term.

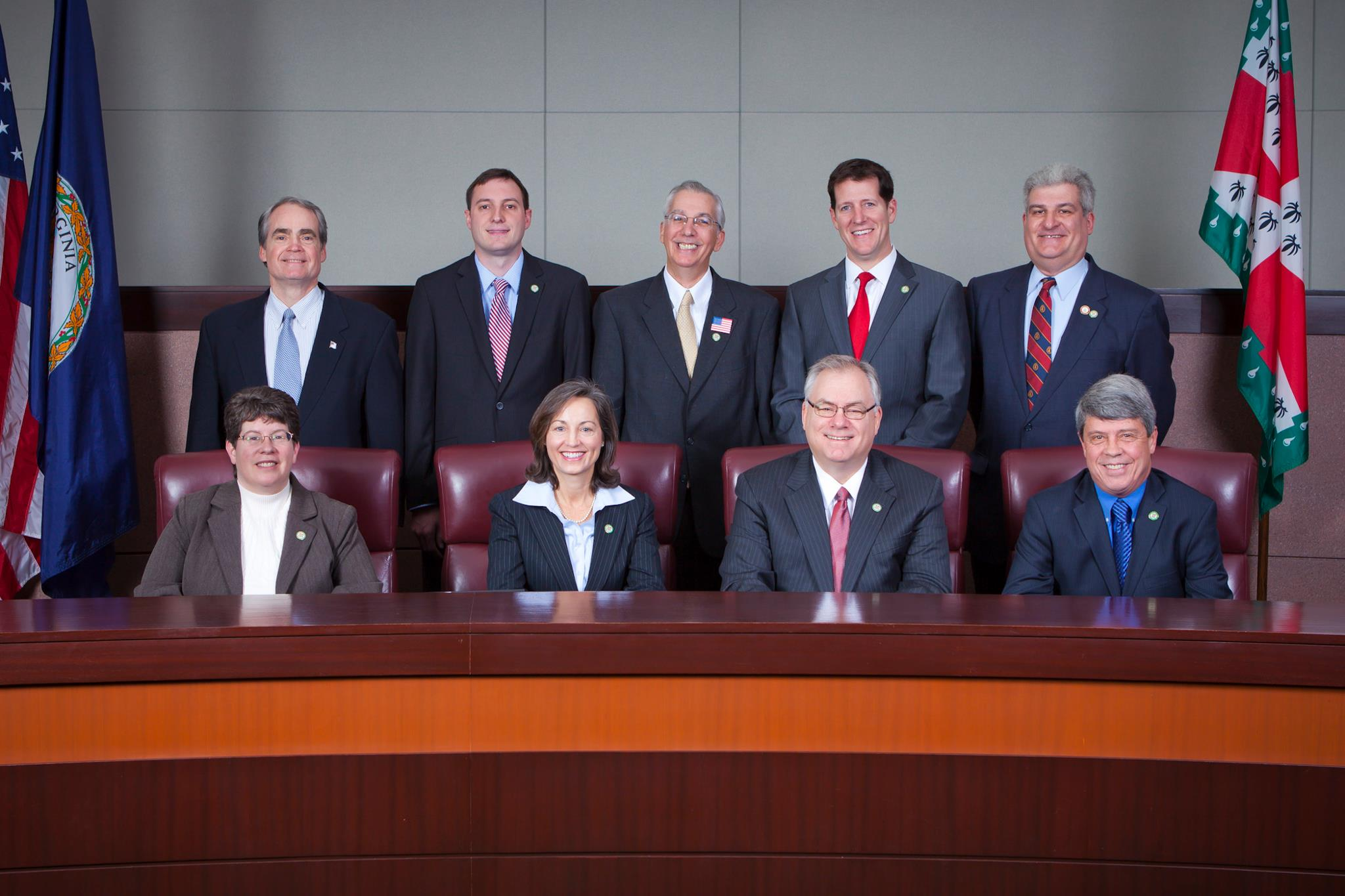
Top row (left to right): Geary Higgins, Matt Letourneau, Eugene Delgaudio, Shawn Williams, Ken Reid. Bottom row (left to right): Suzanne Volpe, Janet Clarke, Scott York, Ralph Buona.

Loudoun County Board of Supervisors (January 1, 2012, to December 31, 2015) (elected on November 8, 2011)
Position	Name	Party	First elected	District
Chair	Scott Kiefer York	Independent	1995	At-large
Supervisor	Suzanne Marie Volpe	Republican	2011	Algonkian
Supervisor	Ralph Mark Buona	Republican	2011	Ashburn
Supervisor	Janet Sue Clarke	Republican	2011	Blue Ridge
Supervisor	Shawn Marcus Williams (resigned)	Republican	2011	Broad Run
Supervisor	James Gregory Bonfils	Republican	Appointed 2015	Broad Run
Supervisor	Geary Michael Higgins	Republican	2011	Catoctin
Supervisor	Matthew Farrell Letourneau	Republican	2011	Dulles
Supervisor	Kenneth David Reid	Republican	2011	Leesburg
Supervisor	Eugene Anthony Delgaudio	Republican	1999	Sterling

In November 2011, Republicans were elected to all nine seats on the board. Over the course of the four-year term, three supervisors served as the vice chair: Janet Clarke (Blue Ridge), Shawn Williams (Broad Run), and Ralph Buona (Ashburn). Clarke was elected Vice-Chair on January 3, 2012, and served until December 31, 2012, choosing not to hold the position a second year. On January 2, 2013, Williams was elected to serve as the next vice chair, a position he held until March 2015. Williams resigned the vice chair post on March 16, 2015, after a 2006 arrest for assault in Ocean City, Maryland resurfaced. Two days later, on March 18, 2015, the board elected Buona as the new vice chair, a position he held through the remainder of the term. On September 6, 2015, Shawn Williams, the Broad Run District Supervisor, resigned his supervisor position after being arrested for simple assault and unlawful entry earlier that day. The board appointed Jim Bonfils to fill the Broad Run District seat on September 21, 2015, from a list of 13 applicants (including former Broad Run District Supervisors Steve Stockman, David McWatters, and Chuck Harris). Bonfils was sworn in on September 22, 2015, and served out the remaining 101 days of the term.

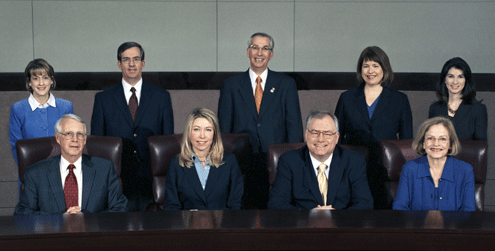
Top row (left to right): Kelly Burk, Stevens Miller, Eugene Delguadio, Andrea McGimsey, Lori Waters. Bottom row (left to right): Jim Gordon, Susan Buckley, Scott York, Sally Kurtz.

Loudoun County Board of Supervisors (January 1, 2008, to December 31, 2011) (elected on November 6, 2007)
Position	Name	Party	First elected	District
Chair	Scott Kiefer York	Independent	1995	At-large
Vice chair	Susan Klimek Buckley	Democratic	2007	Sugarland Run
Supervisor	James Gordon Burton	Independent	2003	Blue Ridge
Supervisor	Lori L. Waters	Republican	2003	Broad Run
Supervisor	Sarah Roach Kurtz	Democratic	1999	Catoctin
Supervisor	Stevens R. Miller	Democratic	2007	Dulles
Supervisor	Cathleen Kelly Burk	Democratic	2007	Leesburg
Supervisor	Andrea Christiane McGimsey	Democratic	2007	Potomac
Supervisor	Eugene Anthony Delgaudio	Republican	1999	Sterling

In November 2007, voters removed four incumbent, fiscally conservative Republicans from the board of supervisors in a backlash over rapid development in the county's eastern portion. The board's make-up after the election was five Democrats, two Republicans, and two Independents. This was also the first time women made up a majority of the board members (Buckley, Waters, Kurtz, Burk, McGimsey). Sugarland Run District Supervisor, Susan Klimek Buckley, served as vice chair all four years of the term.

Loudoun County Board of Supervisors (January 1, 2004, to December 31, 2007) (elected on November 4, 2003)
Position	Name	Party	First elected	District
Chair	Scott Kiefer York	Independent	1995	At-large
Vice chair	Bruce Edward Tulloch	Republican	2003	Potomac
Supervisor	James Gordon Burton	Independent	2003	Blue Ridge
Supervisor	Lori L. Waters	Republican	2003	Broad Run
Supervisor	Sarah Roach Kurtz	Democratic	1999	Catoctin
Supervisor	Stephen J. Snow	Republican	2003	Dulles
Supervisor	James E. Clem	Republican	2003	Leesburg
Supervisor	Eugene Anthony Delgaudio	Republican	1999	Sterling
Supervisor	David M. "Mick" Staton Jr.	Republican	2003	Sugarland Run

The 2003 board, and other officials in Loudoun, were the subject of a federal investigation of possible corruption relating to a land deal involving the Royal Saudi Academy. Potomac District Supervisor Bruce Tulloch served as vice chair all four years of the term.

Loudoun County Board of Supervisors (January 1, 2000, to December 31, 2003) (elected on November 2, 1999)
Position	Name	Party	First elected	District
Chair	Scott Kiefer York	Independent	1995	At-large
Vice chair	Eleanore Adele Craig Towe	Democratic	1995	Blue Ridge
Supervisor	Charles A. Harris	Democratic	1999	Broad Run
Supervisor	Sarah Roach Kurtz	Democratic	1999	Catoctin
Supervisor	John Drew Hiatt	Republican	1999	Dulles
Supervisor	Mark Rankin Herring	Democratic	1999	Leesburg
Supervisor	James Gordon Burton	Independent	1995	Mercer
Supervisor	Eugene Anthony Delgaudio	Republican	1999	Sterling
Supervisor	William Dale Bogard	Independent	1999	Sugarland Run

Loudoun County Board of Supervisors (January 1, 1996, to December 31, 1999) (elected on November 7, 1995)
Position	Name	Party	First elected	District
Chair	Dale Polen Myers	Republican	1995	At-large
Vice chair	Joan Gillette Rokus	Republican	1991	Leesburg
Supervisor	Eleanore Adele Craig Towe	Democratic	1995	Blue Ridge
Supervisor	David G. McWatters	Republican	1995	Broad Run
Supervisor	Helen Anderson Marcum	Republican	1995	Catoctin
Supervisor	Lawrence Sylvester Beerman II	Republican	1995	Dulles
Supervisor	James Gordon Burton	Independent	1995	Mercer
Supervisor	Scott Kiefer York	Republican	1995	Sterling
Supervisor	Steven D. Whitener	Republican	1991	Sugarland Run

In November 1995, Dale Polen Myers became the first woman to be elected at-large to chair the board.

Loudoun County Board of Supervisors (January 1, 1992, to December 31, 1995) (elected on November 5, 1991)
Position	Name	Party	First elected	District
Chair	George Lloyd Barton IV	Republican	1991	At-large
Supervisor	George E. Washington	Republican	1991	Blue Ridge
Supervisor	Charles D. Grant	Republican	1991	Broad Run
Supervisor	Richard Llewellyn Roberts	Republican	1991	Catoctin
Supervisor	Charles Edward Scaggs	Independent	1991	Dulles
Supervisor	Joan Gillette Rokus	Republican	1991	Leesburg
Supervisor	Thomas Strickland Dodson (resigned)	Democratic	1979	Mercer
Supervisor	Ready Lannom Snodgrass	Republican	1994	Mercer
Supervisor	Harold Roger Zurn Jr.	Republican	1990	Sterling
Supervisor	Steven D. Whitener	Republican	1991	Sugarland Run

In November 1990, Loudoun voters approved the addition of a ninth, chair-at-large seat via a referendum vote. In November 1991, the newly created chair-at-large seat was elected for the first time, with Republicans claiming eight of the nine seats on the board. The sole Democrat on the board, Mercer District Supervisor Thomas Dodson, resigned his position effective December 31, 1993, after taking a job out of the area. The board appointed Republican Ready Snodgrass in January 1994 to fill the Mercer District seat, bringing the board under total Republican control. She subsequently won the November 8, 1994 special election to permanently fill the seat.

Loudoun County Board of Supervisors (January 1, 1988, to December 31, 1991) (elected on November 3, 1987)
Position	Name	Party	First elected	District
Chair	Betty Williams Tatum	Democratic	1981	Guilford
Vice chair	Charles Anthony Bos	Democratic	1987	Leesburg
Supervisor	James F. Brownell	Republican	1967	Blue Ridge
Supervisor	Steven William Stockman	Republican	1983	Broad Run
Supervisor	Betsey Jean Smith Brown	Democratic	1987	Catoctin
Supervisor	Ann B. Kavanagh	Democratic	1983	Dulles
Supervisor	Thomas Strickland Dodson	Democratic	1979	Mercer
Supervisor	Alice Graham Bird (resigned)	Independent	1987	Sterling
Supervisor	Howard P. Smith	Democratic	Appointed 1989	Sterling
Supervisor	Harold Roger Zurn Jr.	Republican	1990	Sterling

In November 1987, Alice Bird defeated her ex-husband, two-term incumbent Andrew Bird, in a bid for the Sterling District seat. On September 5, 1989, Alice Bird announced she was resigning her position effective October 1, 1989, to take a job in Georgia. In October 1989, the board appointed Howard Smith to temporarily fill the vacant Sterling District seat until a special election could be held in November 1990. Smith lost the November 6, 1990 special election to Roger Zurn, flipping the Sterling District seat from Democrat to Republican. Leesburg District Supervisor Charles Bos held the vice chair position all four years of the term.

Loudoun County Board of Supervisors (January 1, 1984, to December 31, 1987) (elected on November 8, 1983)
Position	Name	Party	First elected	District
Supervisor	James F. Brownell	Republican	1967	Blue Ridge
Supervisor	Steven William Stockman	Republican	1983	Broad Run
Supervisor	Frank I. Lambert	Republican	1983	Catoctin
Supervisor	Ann B. Kavanagh	Democratic	1983	Dulles
Supervisor	Betty Williams Tatum	Democratic	1981	Guilford
Supervisor	Frank Raflo (resigned)	Democratic	1971	Leesburg
Supervisor	Charles Anthony Bos	Democratic	Appointed 1986	Leesburg
Supervisor	Thomas Strickland Dodson	Democratic	1979	Mercer
Supervisor	Andrew Reid Bird III	Republican	1979	Sterling

In November 1983, Loudoun voters elected four Democrats and four Republicans to the board of supervisors, making for an even split. The supervisors agreed to alternate the chair position between a Republican and a Democrat every year for the four-year term. Blue Ridge District Supervisor James Brownell served as chair during both the Republican years, first from January 1984 to December 1984, and second from January 1986 to December 1986. Democratic Leesburg District Supervisor Frank Raflo served as chair from January 1985 to December 1985. On January 5, 1987, Democratic Guilford District Supervisor Betty Tatum was elected chair, becoming the first woman in the history of the board of supervisors to lead the group. In December 1986, Leesburg District Supervisor Frank Raflo resigned for health reasons. Later that month, the Board appointed Charles Bos to fill the Leesburg District seat and serve out the remainder of the term.

Loudoun County Board of Supervisors (January 1, 1980, to December 31, 1983) (elected on November 6, 1979)
Position	Name	Party	First elected	District
Vice chair	James F. Brownell	Republican	1967	Blue Ridge
Supervisor	Carl Frederick Henrickson	Democratic	1976	Broad Run
Supervisor	John Milton	Democratic	1979	Catoctin
Supervisor	Travis L. Sample	Democratic	1979	Dulles
Supervisor	Gerry Gardner (resigned)	Democratic	1976	Guilford
Supervisor	Betty Williams Tatum	Democratic	1981	Guilford
Supervisor	Frank Raflo	Democratic	1971	Leesburg
Supervisor	Thomas Strickland Dodson	Democratic	1979	Mercer
Supervisor	Andrew Reid Bird III	Republican	1979	Sterling

In June 1981, Guilford District Supervisor Gerry Gardner resigned for personal reasons and left the area. The board appointed Betty Tatum in July 1981 to fill the Guilford District seat until a special election could be held that November. Tatum ran and won the November 3, 1981 special election, defeating former Guilford District Supervisor Bob Scheetz. Broad Run District Supervisor Carl Henrickson held the chair position until December 1981. Mercer District Supervisor Thomas Dodson was chair from January 1982 to December 1983.

Loudoun County Board of Supervisors (January 1, 1976, to December 31, 1979) (elected on November 4, 1975)
Position	Name	Party	First elected	District
Supervisor	James F. Brownell	Republican	1967	Blue Ridge
Supervisor	Carl Frederick Henrickson	Democratic	1975	Broad Run
Supervisor	Ronald W. Blake	Independent	1975	Catoctin
Supervisor	Henry Clinton Stowers	Democratic	1971	Dulles
Supervisor	Robert E. Scheetz	Democratic	Appointed 1975	Guilford
Supervisor	Gerry Gardner	Democratic	1976	Guilford
Supervisor	Frank Raflo	Democratic	1971	Leesburg
Supervisor	William C. Crossman Jr.	Democratic	1971	Mercer
Supervisor	George H. Yeager (resigned)	Independent	1975	Sterling
Supervisor	Shannon Harris Geddie	Democratic	1978	Sterling

Due to rapid development around the continually growing Sterling area, the populations of the Broad Run and Sterling Districts were vastly greater than the populations of the other five districts. To address this population discrepancy, throughout 1974 and 1975, the board went through a redistricting process in the eastern part of Loudoun County. Through the redistricting process, the board approved a plan to split the area consisting of the existing Broad Run and Sterling Districts into three districts, thus creating one new district. This newly added eighth district would be called the Guilford District. Due to the redistricting occurring in an election year, the supervisor for the newly created district had to be appointed. On December 16, 1975, Bob Scheetz was sworn in as the Guilford District supervisor. Carl Hendrickson and George Yeager were also sworn in on the same day to take their seats as supervisors for the redrawn Broad Run and Sterling Districts. Before the November 1976 special election was held to permanently fill the Guilford seat, Scheetz was challenged by Gerry Gardner in a Democratic primary that same year. Gardner won the Democratic primary, and subsequently won the November 2, 1976 special election as well, becoming the first woman to serve on the Loudoun County Board of Supervisors.

In June 1978, Sterling District Supervisor George Yeager, the board chair since January 1978, resigned his seat to accept a job in West Virginia, effective July 11, 1978. The board appointed Shannon Geddie to fill the Sterling District seat, becoming the second woman to serve on the Loudoun County Board of Supervisors when she was sworn in on July 17, 1978. She won the 1978 special election to retain the supervisor position, but lost the 1979 general election. The chair position formerly held by Yeager was filled by Broad Run District Supervisor Carl Henrickson. Dulles District Supervisor Henry Stowers remained vice chair. During this term, Mercer District Supervisor William Crossman, a Democrat, held the chair position from January 1976 to December 1977.

Loudoun County Board of Supervisors (January 1, 1972, to December 31, 1975) (elected on November 2, 1971)
Position	Name	Party	First elected	District
Chair	William C. Crossman Jr.	Democratic	1971	Mercer
Supervisor	James F. Brownell	Republican	1967	Blue Ridge
Supervisor	John Albert Costello Sr.	Democratic	1971	Broad Run
Supervisor	James Edwin Arnold	Independent	1955	Catoctin
Supervisor	Henry Clinton Stowers	Democratic	1971	Dulles
Supervisor	Frank Raflo	Democratic	1971	Leesburg
Supervisor	Paul J. Walstad (resigned)	Independent	1971	Sterling
Supervisor	James Franklin Cave	Independent	Appointed 1974	Sterling

After the completion of the 1970 Census, the board went through a redistricting process in 1971. On June 23, 1971, the board adopted its new districts, dropping the Jefferson, Lovettsville, and Mount Gilead district names in favor of Dulles, Catoctin, and Blue Ridge. The Sterling District was also created, bringing the total number of districts to seven.

In October 1974, Sterling District Supervisor Paul Walstad resigned, with the October 15, 1974 meeting being his last. James Cave was appointed by a judge to fill the vacant Sterling District seat, attending his first meeting on November 5, 1974.

Loudoun County Board of Supervisors (January 1, 1968, to December 31, 1971) (elected on November 7, 1967)
Position	Name	Party	First elected	District
Chair	William Stuart Leach	Independent	1963	Mercer
Vice chair	Huntington Harris	Independent	1967	Leesburg
Supervisor	Charles Lindy Waddell	Democratic	1967	Broad Run
Supervisor	Douglas Nelson Myers	Independent	1967	Jefferson
Supervisor	Robert Pearre McClain (died)	Independent	1967	Lovettsville
Supervisor	James Edwin Arnold	Independent	Appointed 1970	Lovettsville
Supervisor	James F. Brownell	Republican	1967	Mount Gilead

On January 2, 1968, Mercer District Supervisor William Leach was elected chair of the board, and served as chair for the entire term. On September 5, 1970, Lovettsville District Supervisor Bob McClain died after being in the hospital. Former Lovettsville District Supervisor James Arnold was appointed to fill the seat.

Loudoun County Board of Supervisors (January 1, 1964, to December 31, 1967) (elected on November 5, 1963)
Position	Name	Party	First elected	District
Chair	John Emory Kirkpatrick	Democratic	1943	Broad Run
Vice chair	Dr. William Penn Frazer	Independent	1955	Jefferson
Supervisor	Silas Duran Phillips	Independent	1955	Leesburg
Supervisor	James Edwin Arnold	Independent	1955	Lovettsville
Supervisor	William Stuart Leach	Independent	1963	Mercer
Supervisor	Julian Terry Hirst	Democratic	1939	Mount Gilead

Loudoun County Board of Supervisors (January 1, 1960, to December 31, 1963) (elected on November 3, 1959)
Position	Name	Party	First elected	District
Chair	John Emory Kirkpatrick	Democratic	1943	Broad Run
Vice chair	Dr. William Penn Frazer	Independent	1955	Jefferson
Supervisor	Silas Duran Phillips	Independent	1955	Leesburg
Supervisor	James Edwin Arnold	Independent	1955	Lovettsville
Supervisor	Joshua Fletcher	Independent	1955	Mercer
Supervisor	Julian Terry Hirst	Democratic	1939	Mount Gilead

Loudoun County Board of Supervisors (January 1, 1956, to December 31, 1959) (elected on November 8, 1955)
Position	Name	Party	First elected	District
Chair	John Emory Kirkpatrick	Democratic	1943	Broad Run
Supervisor	Dr. William Penn Frazer	Independent	1955	Jefferson
Supervisor	Silas Duran Phillips	Independent	1955	Leesburg
Supervisor	James Edwin Arnold	Independent	1955	Lovettsville
Supervisor	Joshua Fletcher	Independent	1955	Mercer
Supervisor	Julian Terry Hirst	Democratic	1939	Mount Gilead

Loudoun County Board of Supervisors (January 1, 1952, to December 31, 1955) (elected on November 6, 1951)
Position	Name	Party	First elected	District
Supervisor	John Emory Kirkpatrick	Democratic	1943	Broad Run
Supervisor	Hayward Caden Thompson	Democratic	1951	Jefferson
Supervisor	Birtrand Willard McKimmey	Democratic	1947	Leesburg
Supervisor	Irvey Willard Baker (died)	Republican	1931	Lovettsville
Supervisor	James Edwin Arnold	Independent	Appointed 1955	Lovettsville
Supervisor	Daniel Cox Sands	Democratic	1935	Mercer
Supervisor	Charles Randolph Hope	Democratic	1951	Mount Gilead

Board chair, Lovettsville District Supervisor Irvey Baker, died on February 10, 1955. At the March 7, 1955, board meeting, Hayward Thompson was elected to serve as chair for the remainder of the term, and James Arnold was appointed to fill the Lovettsville District seat.

Loudoun County Board of Supervisors (January 1, 1948, to December 31, 1951) (elected on November 4, 1947)
Position	Name	Party	First elected	District
Chair	Irvey Willard Baker	Republican	1931	Lovettsville
Supervisor	John Emory Kirkpatrick	Democratic	1943	Broad Run
Supervisor	Joseph Homer Mock (resigned)	Democratic	1935	Jefferson
Supervisor	Hayward Caden Thompson	Democratic	Appointed 1950	Jefferson
Supervisor	Birtrand Willard McKimmey	Democratic	1947	Leesburg
Supervisor	Daniel Cox Sands	Democratic	1935	Mercer
Supervisor	Julian Terry Hirst	Democratic	1939	Mount Gilead

Jefferson District Supervisor Homer Mock resigned at the end of 1949. His successor was appointed at the January 3, 1950 meeting to complete the unexpired term.

Loudoun County Board of Supervisors (January 1, 1944, to December 31, 1947) (elected on November 2, 1943)
Position	Name	Party	First elected	District
Chair	Irvey Willard Baker	Republican	1931	Lovettsville
Supervisor	John Emory Kirkpatrick	Democratic	1943	Broad Run
Supervisor	Joseph Homer Mock	Democratic	1935	Jefferson
Supervisor	Benjamin Bridges	Democratic	1943	Leesburg
Supervisor	Daniel Cox Sands	Democratic	1935	Mercer
Supervisor	Julian Terry Hirst	Democratic	1939	Mount Gilead

Loudoun County Board of Supervisors (January 1, 1940, to December 31, 1943) (elected on November 7, 1939)
Position	Name	Party	First elected	District
Chair	Michael Henry "Bud" Whitmore	Democratic	1901	Leesburg
Supervisor	Harry Randolph Tillett	Democratic	1935	Broad Run
Supervisor	Joseph Homer Mock	Democratic	1935	Jefferson
Supervisor	Irvey Willard Baker	Republican	1931	Lovettsville
Supervisor	Daniel Cox Sands	Democratic	1935	Mercer
Supervisor	Julian Terry Hirst	Democratic	1939	Mount Gilead

Loudoun County Board of Supervisors (January 1, 1936, to December 31, 1939) (elected on November 5, 1935)
Position	Name	Party	First elected	District
Chair	Michael Henry "Bud" Whitmore	Democratic	1901	Leesburg
Supervisor	Harry Randolph Tillett	Democratic	1935	Broad Run
Supervisor	Joseph Homer Mock	Democratic	1935	Jefferson
Supervisor	Irvey Willard Baker	Republican	1931	Lovettsville
Supervisor	Daniel Cox Sands	Democratic	1935	Mercer
Supervisor	Howard Cochran Rogers	Democratic	1919	Mount Gilead

Loudoun County Board of Supervisors (January 1, 1932, to December 31, 1935) (elected on November 3, 1931)
Position	Name	Party	First elected	District
Chair	Michael Henry "Bud" Whitmore	Democratic	1901	Leesburg
Supervisor	Philip Johnston Coleman	Democratic	1927	Broad Run
Supervisor	Dr. William Hugh Grubb	Independent	1923	Jefferson
Supervisor	Irvey Willard Baker	Republican	1931	Lovettsville
Supervisor	Carroll Irvin Leith	Independent	1927	Mercer
Supervisor	Howard Cochran Rogers	Democratic	1919	Mount Gilead

Loudoun County Board of Supervisors (January 1, 1928, to December 31, 1931) (elected on November 8, 1927)
Position	Name	Party	First elected	District
Chair	Michael Henry "Bud" Whitmore	Democratic	1901	Leesburg
Supervisor	Philip Johnston Coleman	Democratic	1927	Broad Run
Supervisor	Dr. William Hugh Grubb	Independent	1923	Jefferson
Supervisor	Robert Geary Johnson	Independent	1919	Lovettsville
Supervisor	Carroll Irvin Leith	Independent	1927	Mercer
Supervisor	Howard Cochran Rogers	Democratic	1919	Mount Gilead

Loudoun County Board of Supervisors (January 1, 1924, to December 31, 1927) (elected on November 6, 1923)
Position	Name	Party	First elected	District
Chair	Michael Henry "Bud" Whitmore	Democratic	1901	Leesburg
Supervisor	Philip D. Sowers	Independent	1915	Broad Run
Supervisor	Dr. William Hugh Grubb	Independent	1923	Jefferson
Supervisor	Robert Geary Johnson	Independent	1919	Lovettsville
Supervisor	Augustus diZerega Sr.	Independent	1923	Mercer
Supervisor	Howard Cochran Rogers	Democratic	1919	Mount Gilead

Loudoun County Board of Supervisors (January 1, 1920, to December 31, 1923) (elected on November 4, 1919)
Position	Name	Party	First elected	District
Chair	Michael Henry "Bud" Whitmore	Democratic	1901	Leesburg
Supervisor	Philip D. Sowers	Independent	1915	Broad Run
Supervisor	William Derizo Thompson (died)	Independent	1901	Jefferson
Supervisor	Dr. William Hugh Grubb	Independent	Appointed 1922	Jefferson
Supervisor	Robert Geary Johnson	Independent	1919	Lovettsville
Supervisor	George "Geo" Frasier (died)	Independent	1897	Mercer
Supervisor	Augustus diZerega Sr.	Independent	Appointed 1922	Mercer
Supervisor	Howard Cochran Rogers	Democratic	1919	Mount Gilead

Jefferson District Supervisor William Thompson died on April 18, 1922, and Mercer District Supervisor George Frasier died on May 20, 1922. Their successors were both appointed the following months.

Loudoun County Board of Supervisors (January 1, 1916, to December 31, 1919) (elected on November 2, 1915)
Position	Name	Party	First elected	District
Chair	Michael Henry "Bud" Whitmore	Democratic	1901	Leesburg
Supervisor	Philip D. Sowers	Independent	1915	Broad Run
Supervisor	William Derizo Thompson	Independent	1901	Jefferson
Supervisor	William Henry Frazier	Independent	1915	Lovettsville
Supervisor	George "Geo" Frasier	Independent	1897	Mercer
Supervisor	James Robert Cochran	Independent	1915	Mount Gilead

Loudoun County Board of Supervisors (January 1, 1912, to December 31, 1915) (elected on November 7, 1911)
Position	Name	Party	First elected	District
Supervisor	John Benjamin Hurst	Independent	1911	Broad Run
Supervisor	William Derizo Thompson	Independent	1901	Jefferson
Supervisor	Michael Henry "Bud" Whitmore	Democratic	1901	Leesburg
Supervisor	John Joseph Crim (died)	Independent	1893	Lovettsville
Supervisor	Samuel Washington George (resigned)	Independent	Appointed 1912	Lovettsville
Supervisor	William Henry Frazier	Independent	Appointed 1914	Lovettsville
Supervisor	George "Geo" Frasier	Independent	1897	Mercer
Supervisor	Thomas Benton James (died)	Independent	1893	Mount Gilead
Supervisor	James Robert Cochran	Independent	Appointed 1915	Mount Gilead

Mount Gilead District Supervisor Thomas Benton James served as chair until his death on June 1, 1915. Leesburg District Supervisor Michael Whitmore was unanimously elected chair on June 14, 1915. James' successor as the Mount Gilead District Supervisor, James Robert Cochran, was appointed by and attended the June 14, 1915 meeting.

Long-serving Lovettsville District Supervisor John Crim died on May 17, 1912. His successor, Samuel George, was appointed in the following months, attending the July 22, 1912 meeting. Samuel George resigned in late 1914 with his successor, William Frazier, appointed and attending the December 5, 1914 meeting.

Loudoun County Board of Supervisors (January 1, 1908, to December 31, 1911) (elected on November 5, 1907)
Position	Name	Party	First elected	District
Chair	Thomas Benton James	Independent	1893	Mount Gilead
Supervisor	Thomas Edward Little	Independent	1903	Broad Run
Supervisor	William Derizo Thompson	Independent	1901	Jefferson
Supervisor	Michael Henry "Bud" Whitmore	Democratic	1901	Leesburg
Supervisor	John Joseph Crim	Independent	1893	Lovettsville
Supervisor	George "Geo" Frasier	Independent	1897	Mercer

Loudoun County Board of Supervisors (January 1, 1904, to December 31, 1907) (elected on November 3, 1903)
Position	Name	Party	First elected	District
Chair	Thomas Benton James	Independent	1893	Mount Gilead
Supervisor	Thomas Edward Little	Independent	1903	Broad Run
Supervisor	William Derizo Thompson	Independent	1901	Jefferson
Supervisor	Michael Henry "Bud" Whitmore	Democratic	1901	Leesburg
Supervisor	John Joseph Crim	Independent	1893	Lovettsville
Supervisor	George "Geo" Frasier	Independent	1897	Mercer

== Election district maps ==
Loudoun County election district maps

Election districts
1976-1983

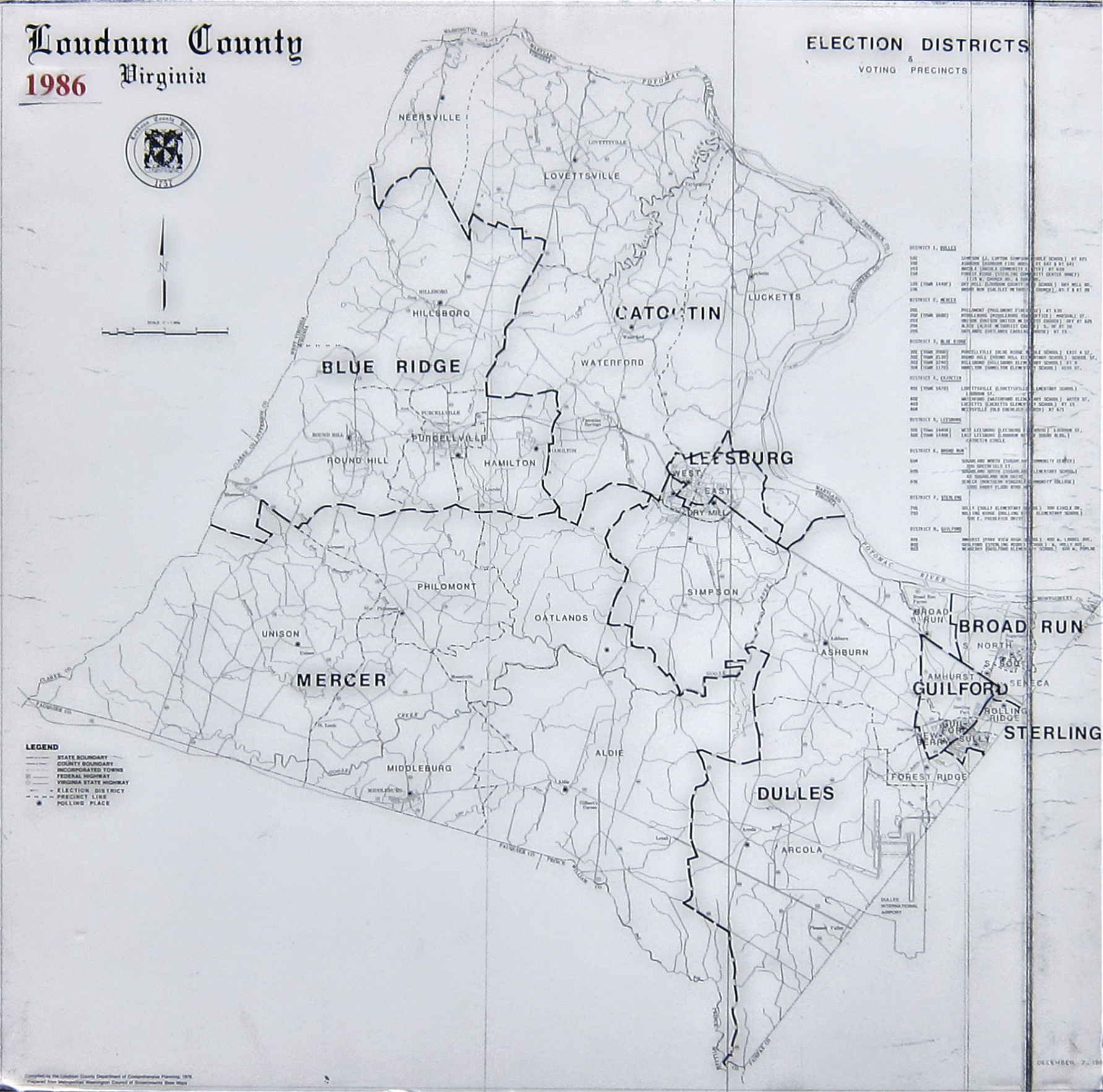
Election districts
1984-1991

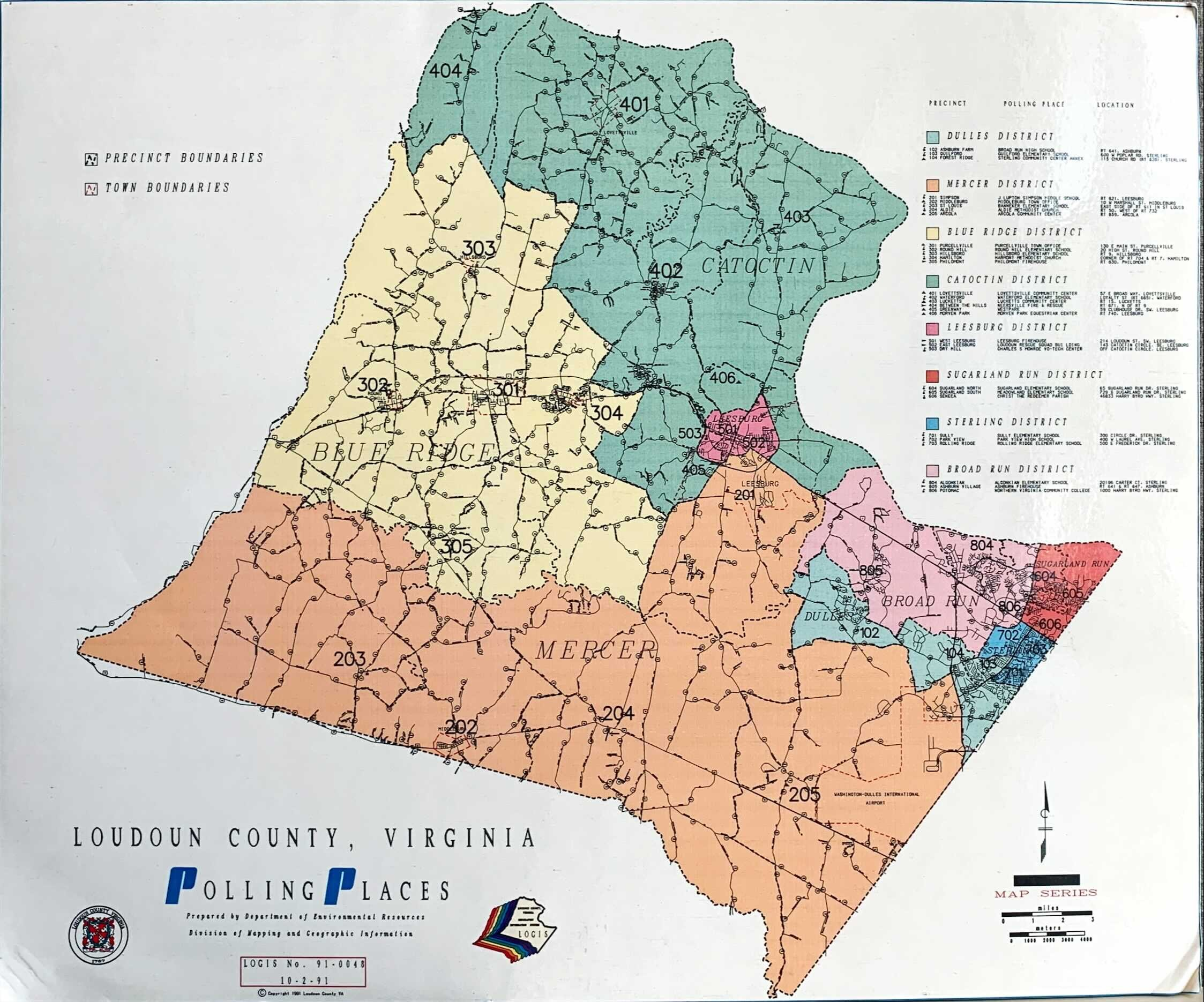
Election districts
1992-2003

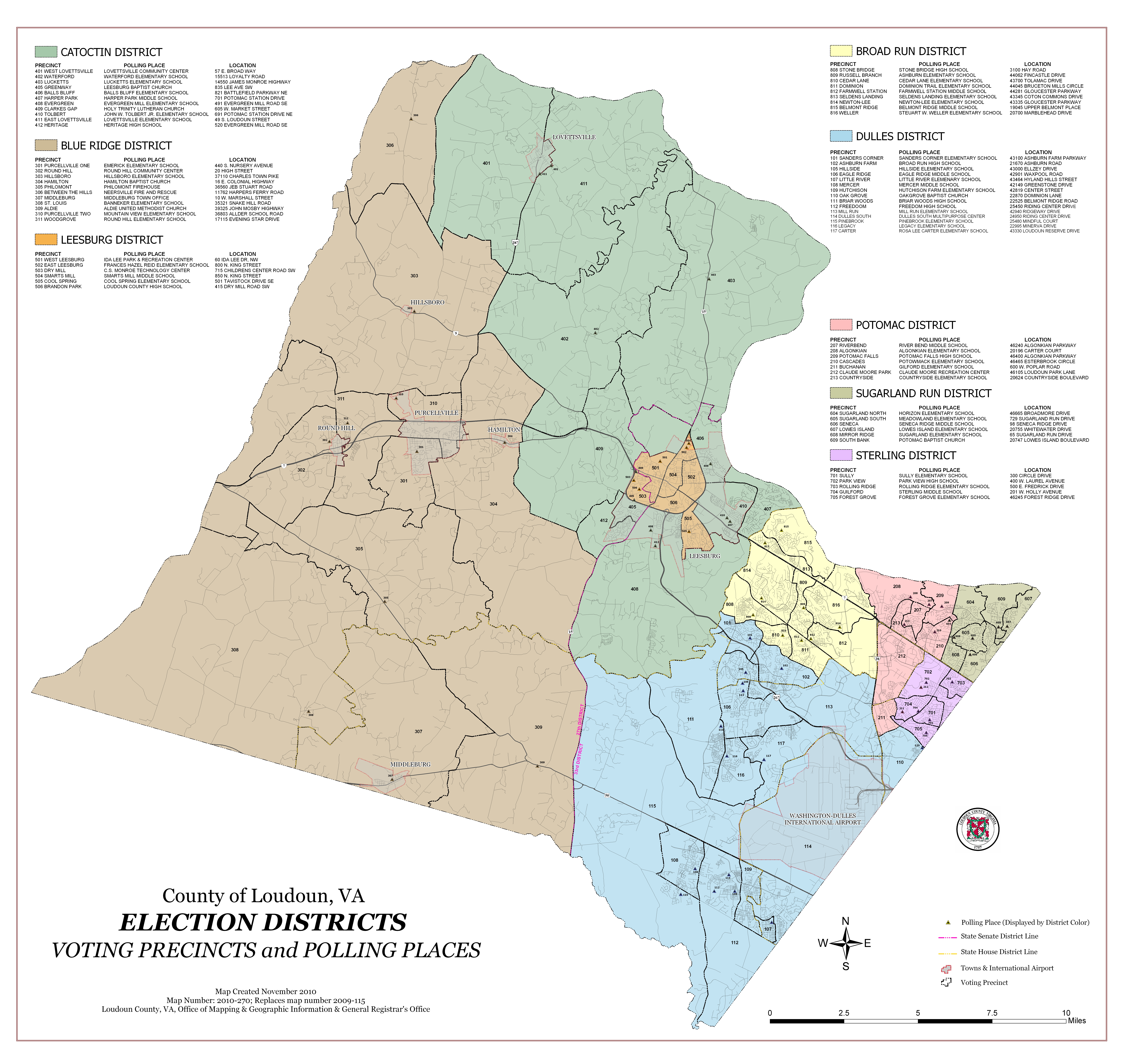
Election districts
2004-2011

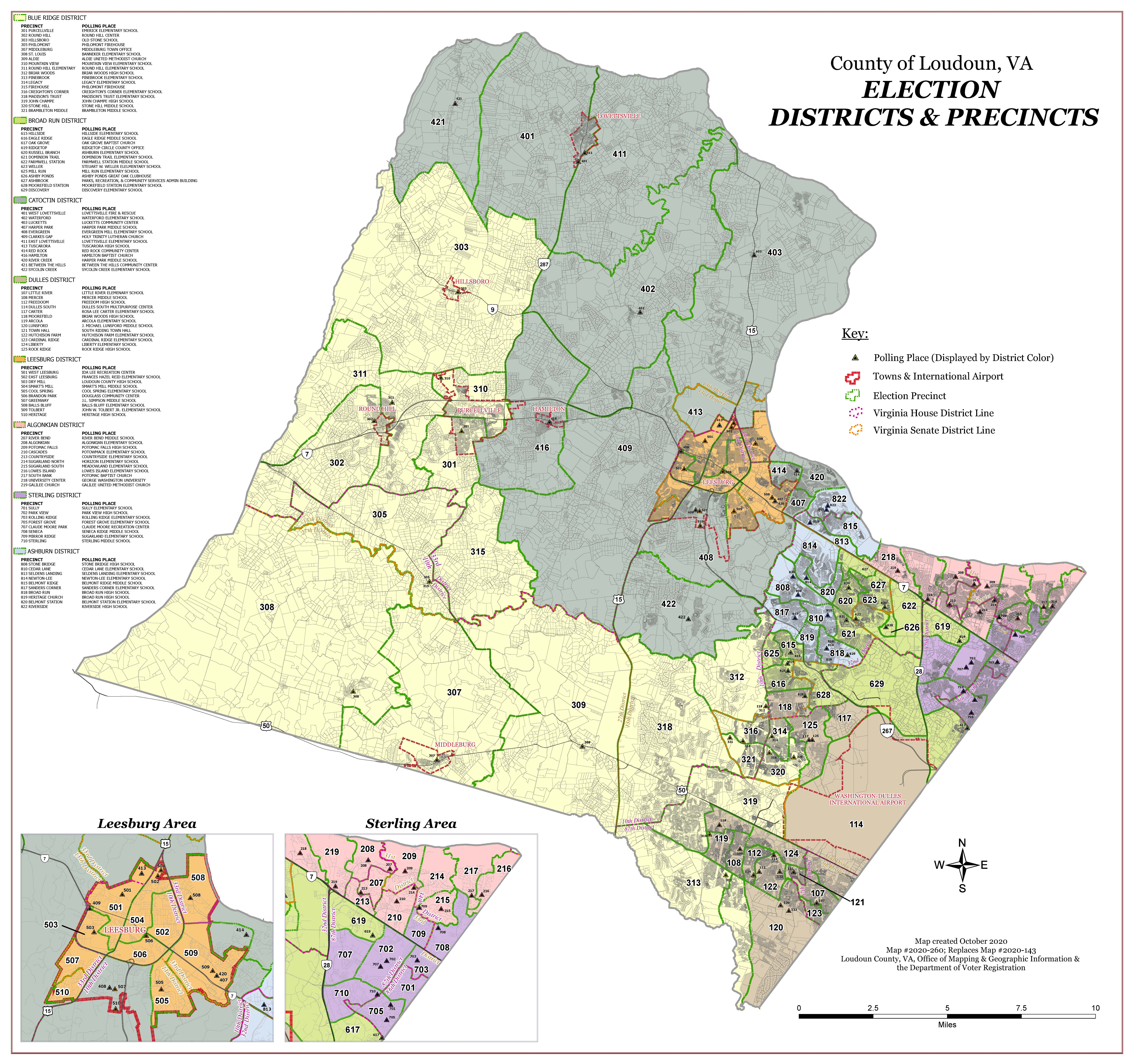
Election districts
2012-2023

Election districts
2024-2031
