= Cuba Adventist Theological Seminary =

Theology school in Havana, Cuba

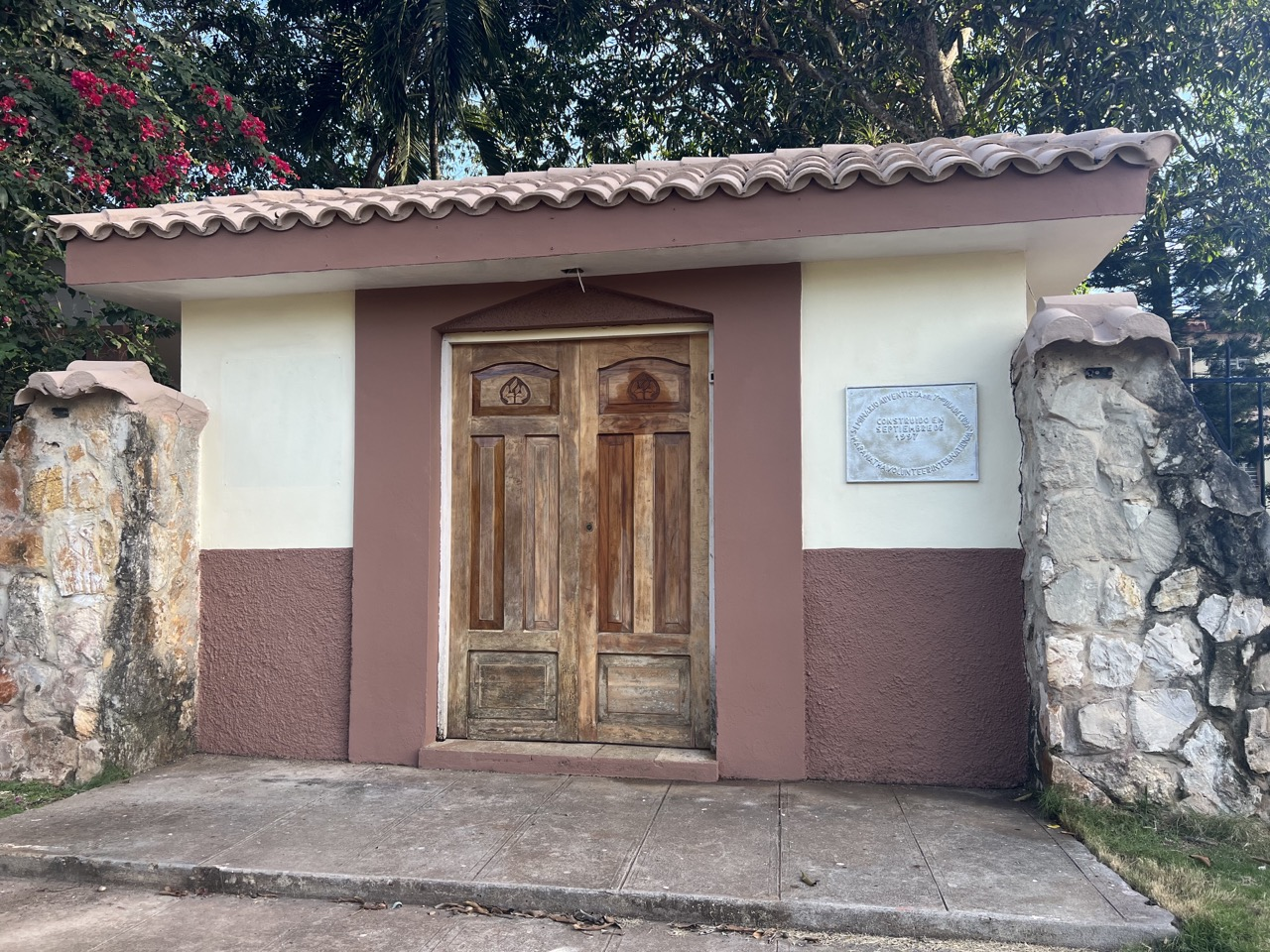
- Entrance
- Type: Private
- Established: 1969
- Affiliations: Inter-American Adventist Theological Seminary
- Religious affiliation: Seventh-day Adventist Church
- Students: approx. 1000
- Location: Havana, Cuba; 22.965637°N 82.378273°W

The Cuba Adventist Theological Seminary (Spanish: Seminario Teológico Adventista de Cuba) is a Seventh-day Adventist theology school located in Havana, Cuba. It prepares men and women to serve the church and community in a climate of growing religious liberty.

== History ==
Cuba Adventist Theological Seminary has its antecedent in Antillian Union College (now Antillean Adventist University) which started in Cuba in 1922 but moved to Puerto Rico following the 1959 Cuban Revolution. In 1969 a seminary was started at the headquarters of the church in Cuba, and in 1985 it developed a relationship with the University of Montemorelos in Mexico as an extension school bringing the facility up to more universally accepted standards. In 1996 the seminary moved to a new campus built by Maranatha Volunteers International, and in 2008 it won full accreditation by the Adventist Accrediting Association (AAA). It is also one of the ten sites in the region where Inter-American Adventist Theological Seminary courses are offered.

Gallery
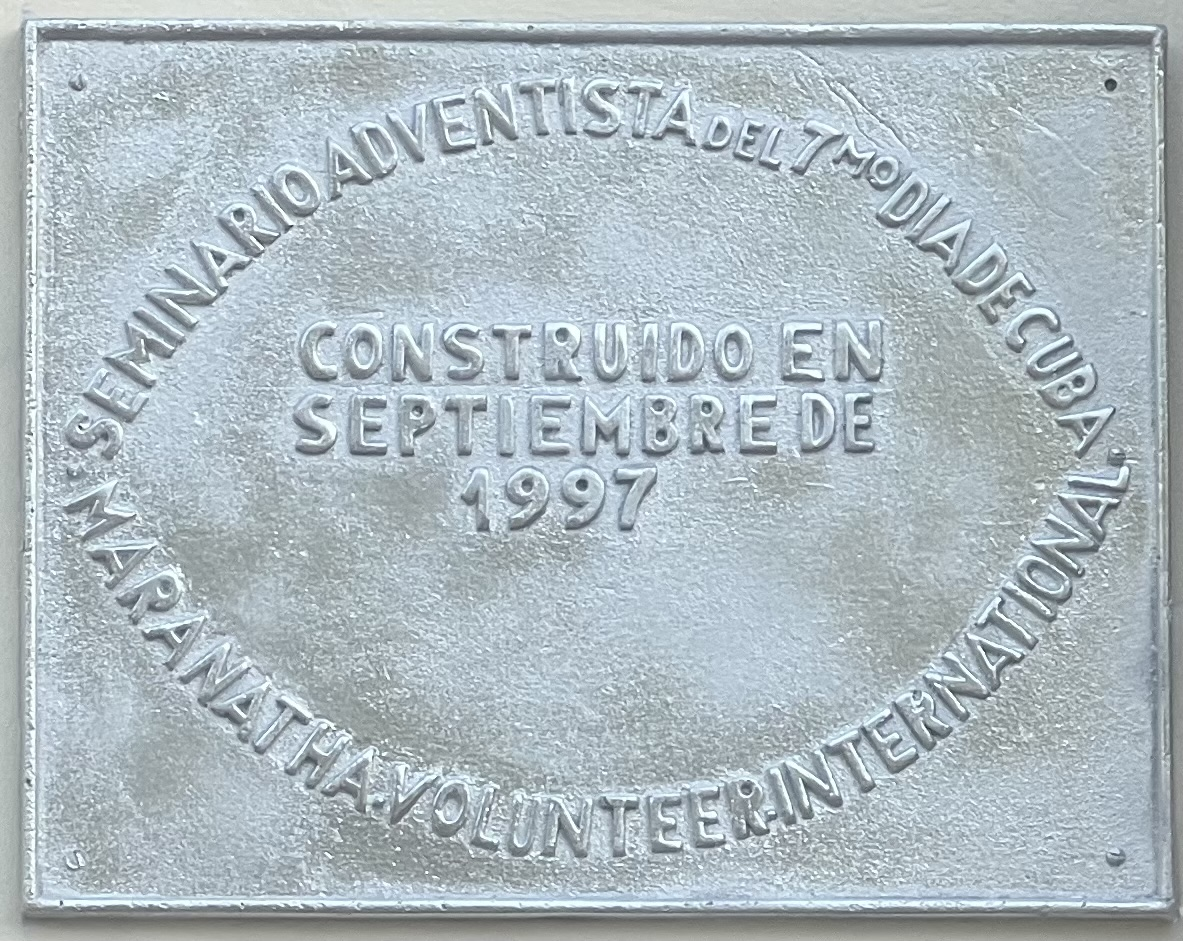
Plaque at entrance

== See also ==
- List of Seventh-day Adventist colleges and universities
- Religion in Cuba
- Christianity in Cuba
- Protestantism in Cuba
- Religion in Latin America
