= Religion in Cuba =

Religion in Cuba (CIA World Factbook 2020)
1. Christianity (58.9%)
2. No religion (23.2%)
3. Folk religions (17.6%)
4. Other religions (0.30%)
Univision Noticias survey of Cubans (2015)
1. Non-religious 44 (43.1%)
2. Catholic 27 (26.5%)
3. Evangelical or Protestant 7 (6.86%)
4. Santería 13 (12.7%)
5. Other or no response 11 (10.8%)

Christianity is the most widely professed religion in Cuba, with Catholicism being its largest denomination. A significant share of the Cuban population is either non-religious or practices folk religions.

Before the arrival of Spanish missionaries, the people residing in the territory of modern-day Cuba practiced a variety of faiths.

== Overview ==
The Cuban population has historically been Christian, primarily Roman Catholic, although the irreligious population has grown substantially in recent decades. Catholicism in Cuba is in some instances profoundly modified and influenced through syncretism. A common syncretic religion is Santería, which combined the Yoruba religion of the African slaves with Catholicism and some Native American strands; it shows similarities to Brazilian Umbanda and has been receiving a degree of official support. The Roman Catholic Church estimates that 60 percent of the population is Catholic, but only 5% of that 60% attends mass regularly, while independent sources estimate that as few as 1.5% of the population does so.

A 2022 survey by Observa Cuba found that 49% of the population professed a religion. In a 2015 survey sponsored by Univision, 44% of Cubans said they were not religious and 9% did not give an answer while 34% said they were religious. Membership in Protestant churches is estimated to be 5 percent and includes Baptists, Pentecostals, Seventh-day Adventists, Presbyterians, Anglicans, Methodists, Religious Society of Friends (Quakers) and Lutherans. In recent decades, Protestantism has seen some flourishing. Other Christian denominations include the Greek Orthodox Church, the Russian Orthodox Church, Jehovah's Witnesses and the Church of Jesus Christ of Latter-day Saints.

Non-Christian minority religions in Cuba include Hinduism and Chinese folk religion, which each account for 0.2% of the population, as well as the Baháʼí Faith, Buddhism, Judaism, Islam and Neoreligions, which all have non-negligible numbers of followers accounting for less than 0.1% of Cuba's population. In addition to the above, 18.0% of Cubans declared themselves to be agnostic and 5.1% claimed to be atheists.

Cuba is home to a variety of syncretic religions of largely African cultural origin. According to a US State Department report, some sources estimate that as much as 80 percent of the population consults with practitioners of religions with West African roots, such as Santeria, Palo, or Cuban Vodú. Santería developed out of the traditions of the Yoruba, one of the African peoples who were imported to Cuba during the 16th through 19th centuries to work on the sugar plantations. Santería blends elements of Christianity and West African beliefs and as such made it possible for the slaves to retain their traditional beliefs while appearing to practice Catholicism. La Virgen de la Caridad del Cobre (Our Lady Of Charity) is the Catholic patroness of Cuba and is greatly revered by the Cuban people and seen as a symbol of Cuba. In Santería, she has been syncretized with the goddess Ochún. The important religious festival "La Virgen de la Caridad del Cobre" is celebrated by Cubans annually on 8 September. Other religions practiced are Palo Monte and Abakuá, which have large parts of their liturgy in African languages.

Although restrictions on religion in Cuba were minimal compared to other communist nations like the Soviet Union or China, the large atheist population was most likely caused by the communist atmosphere of Marxist-Leninist atheism.

== History ==
=== Leadership of Fidel Castro ===
After the communist revolution of 1959, the Cuban government restricted religious practice. Religious people were not allowed to join the Cuban Communist Party due to religion being contradictory to the party's Marxist philosophy. In August 1960, several bishops signed a joint pastoral letter condemning communism and declaring it incompatible with Catholicism, and calling on Catholics to reject it. Castro gave a four-hour speech the next day, condemning priests who serve "great wealth" and using fears of Falangist influence to attack Spanish-born priests, declaring "There is no doubt that Franco has a sizeable group of fascist priests in Cuba and that imperialism, through its falangist and fascist influence with Franco, has been ceaselessly moving its pawns to try to bring the revolution into a conflict."

From 1959 to 1961, 80% of the professional Christian priests and ministers of the Cuban churches left Cuba for the United States. The property of the clergy was also nationalized.

The decade following the 1960s was turbulent, and many people lost interest in religion because much of the religious hierarchy opposed the popular revolution. The Archdiocese of Havana in 1971 reported only 7,000 baptisms. In 1989 this figure had increased to 27,609 and in 1991 to 33,569.

In 1985 the Council of State in Havana published a best-selling book called Fidel y la Religión (Fidel and Religion), which was the condensed transcription of 23 hours of interviews between Fidel Castro and a Brazilian liberation theology friar named Frei Betto, O.P. He admitted the revolution made mistakes with respect to religious people, said discrimination against people of faith must end, and that conditions should be created where usage of "religion as a counter-revolutionary weapon will be nullified by the confidence and fraternity that will exist among all revolutionaries in our country." He claimed responsibility for excluding non-atheists from Communist Party membership on grounds that:

What we were demanding was complete adherence to Marxism-Leninism...It was assumed that anybody who joined the party would accept the party's policy and doctrine in all aspects.

In the years following the collapse of the Soviet Union, the state adopted a more conciliatory position towards religion and lessened its promotion of atheism. In November 1991 the Communist Party began to allow believers into its ranks. In July 1992, the constitution was amended to change the designation of Cuba from being an atheist state to being a secular state, and article 42 was added, which prohibited discrimination based on religious belief. Small worship centers were legally permitted to exist again. In the early 1990s, weekly church-attendance on the island of 11 million was estimated at around 250,000 or about 2% of the population (with an even division between Catholics and Protestants). Cuba had fewer priests per inhabitant than any other Latin American country.

Since 1992, restrictions have been eased, and direct challenges by state institutions to the right to believe eased somewhat, though the Roman Catholic church still faces restrictions of written and electronic communication and can only accept donations from state-approved funding sources. The Roman Catholic Church is made up of the Cuban Catholic Bishops' Conference (CCBC), led by Jaime Lucas Ortega y Alamino, Cardinal Archbishop of Havana. It has eleven dioceses, 56 orders of nuns, and 24 orders of priests.

The Cuban Bishops' Conference has severely criticized the US embargo against Cuba and has claimed that the entire population has suffered from it. The United States Conference of Catholic Bishops has been influenced by this and has argued for the exclusion of food and medicine from the embargo.

In January 1998, although he was an anti-communist, Pope John Paul II paid a historic visit to the island, invited by the Cuban government and the Catholic Church in Cuba. The pope criticized the US embargo during his visit. Pope Benedict XVI visited Cuba in 2012 and Pope Francis visited in 2015. In a shift in policy, the Cuban government has issued permits to allow the construction of a new church in Cuba, the first since 1959.

On October 20, 2008, the first Russian Orthodox Church in Cuba opened during an official ceremony attended by Raúl Castro.

=== Leadership of Raúl Castro ===
The stance of the Cuban Communist Party began to shift. Raúl Castro said in a 2015 televised news conference in which he discussed Pope Francis's September 2015 visit, "I am from the Cuban Communist Party that doesn't allow believers, but now we are allowing it. It's an important step." Castro indicated he might return to being a practicing Catholic and that he would attend the Masses that the pope celebrates in Cuba.

Studies appeared that attempted to link Afro-Cuban religions with mental illness. The campaign for the eradication of racial discrimination in Cuba was used as grounds to forbid the creation of Afro-Cuban institutions because doing so was labeled as racially divisive.

=== Leadership of Miguel Díaz-Canel ===
Miguel Díaz-Canel came to the post of First Secretary of the Communist Party of Cuba (de facto leader) in 2021 with a significant history of advocacy for LGBTQ+ rights. One of the landmark events of his incumbent leadership includes the 2022 Cuban Family Code referendum, which enjoyed vocal support from progressive Christian groups on the island, with whom Díaz-Canel also came to build stronger relationships over years. This was however in contrast to conservative Christian groups, who have opposed the LGBT movement in Cuba and advocate banning abortion in Cuba, which has been legal since 1965.

== Christianity ==
Christianity has played an important role in Cuba's history. The indigenous people of Cuba were colonized by Christopher Columbus a few days after he arrived at the New World in 1492. In 1511, colonization systematically began when the Conquistador Diego Velázquez de Cuéllar established the Catholic Church in Cuba with the early priest Fray Bartolomé de las Casas known commonly as "the Protector of the Indians". Long after the establishment of Catholicism came explicit Protestantism: "Protestantism did not permanently take hold in Cuba until the nineteenth century, though since the sixteenth century the country had been constantly visited by pirates, corsairs and filibusters, many of whom were Protestants". The denominations of Catholicism and Protestantism have a significant influence in Cuban history.

=== Catholicism ===
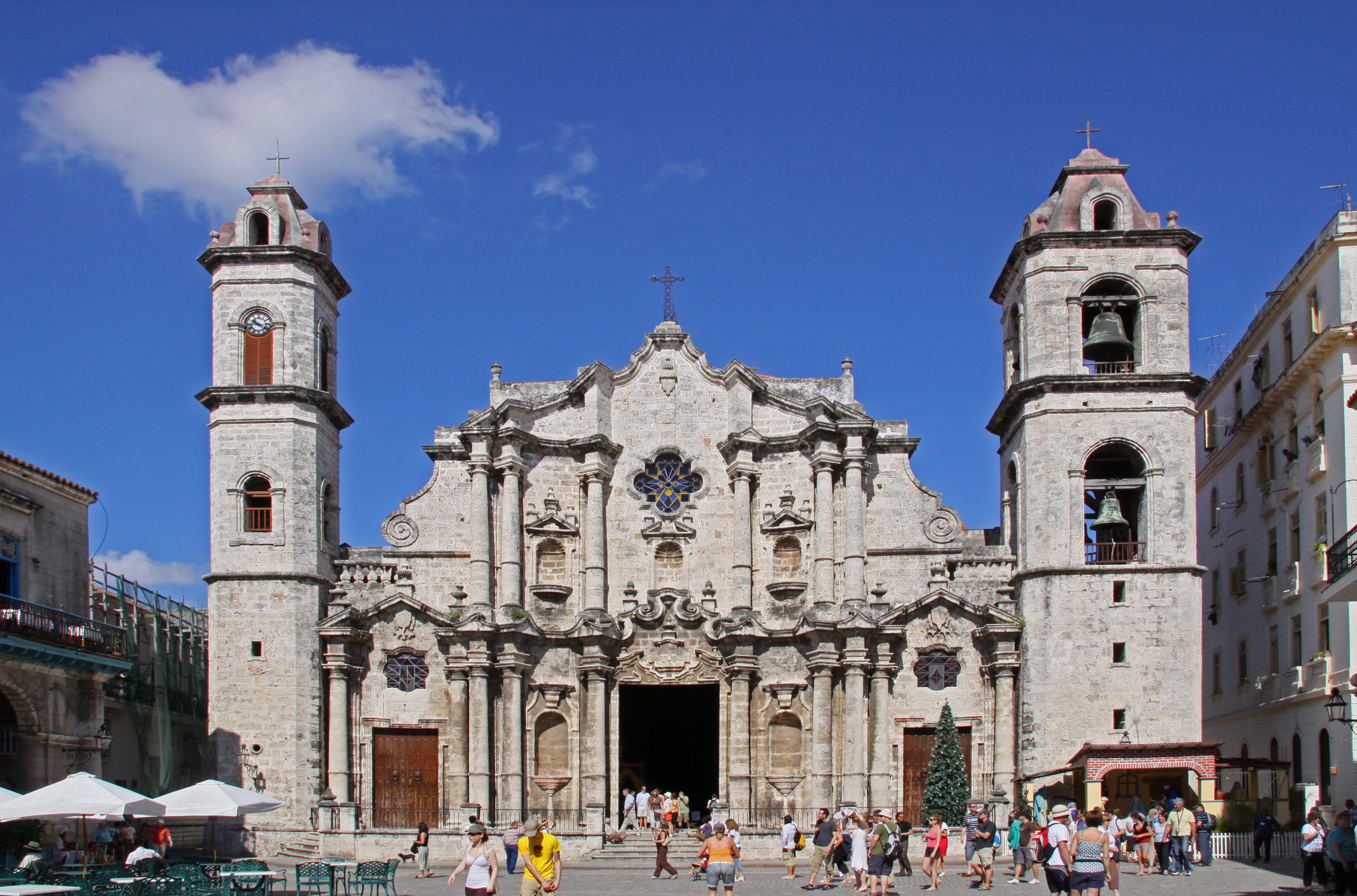
St. Christopher's Cathedral in Havana.

The Catholic Church in Cuba is part of the worldwide Catholic Church, under the spiritual leadership of the Pope in Rome. The Catholic Church body in Cuba is governed by the Cuban Bishops Conference.

In 2020, the Catholic population of Cuba is estimated at 53.7%. The country is divided into eleven dioceses including three archdioceses. The Catholic Church in Cuba has taken on a more politically active role than in many other countries. It claims to have engaged in discussion with the government on issues such as political prisoners and free-market reforms. Catholics in Cuba have greater religious freedom than those in other Communist countries such as China and Vietnam.

=== Protestantism ===
While Protestants arrived on the island of Cuba early in its colonial days, most of their churches did not flourish until the 20th century with the assistance of American missionaries. In the early 20th century, Cuban Protestant churches were greatly aided by various American missionaries who assisted in the work in the churches and also provided support from their home churches. When Fidel Castro’s regime overtook the country in 1959, Protestant churches were legally allowed to continue. Nevertheless, certain incidents as detailed below and religious persecution kept them from prospering. During the Special Period that began in 1991, Protestant churches began to flourish once again and today have become a primary religious group of Cuba.

In 2023, the Protestant population of Cuba is estimated at 2.68%. The largest Protestant denominations were Pentecostal and Baptist.

==== Seventh-day Adventist ====
As of 2016 the Seventh-day Adventist Church in Cuba has more than 34,041 members worshiping in 328 churches and congregations and is reported as one of the largest Protestant churches in Cuba. The relationship with the government has been positive, although the main college, the Antillian Union College which started in Cuba moved to Puerto Rico following the 1959 Cuban Revolution. In 1969 a seminary was started at the headquarters of the church in Cuba, and in 1985 it developed a relationship with the University of Montemorelos in Mexico as an extension school bringing the facility, now called Cuba Adventist Seminary, up to more universally accepted standards. In 1996 the seminary moved to a new campus built by Maranatha Volunteers International, and in 2008 it won full accreditation by the Adventist Accrediting Association (AAA). The pastors and Bible workers in Cuba, hold services and evangelize despite limited resources like computers, books, Sabbath School, and children's ministry resources but the church believes that the improvement in U.S. - Cuba relations could mean greater opportunities for the growth of the church. The president of the Seventh-day Adventist Church in Cuba, Aldo Perez, attended President Obama's speech in Havana on his visit in 2016. In 2017 a new state of the art church was dedicated in Cardenas, Matanzas, with over 1,200 church leaders, members, government representatives and guests from across the island.

=== Jehovah's Witnesses ===
As of 2016, there were about 96,000 active Jehovah's Witnesses in Cuba (about 0.85% of the population). From 1938 to 1947, the number of Jehovah's Witnesses in Cuba increased from about 100 to 4,000. After World War II, membership in Cuba increased to 20,000, and by 1989 there were approximately 30,000 members. The movement was banned in Cuba in 1974, and members have been imprisoned for their refusal of military service. During the Mariel boatlift in 1980, about 3,000 Witnesses left Cuba. In 1994, the Cuban government released representatives of the Watch Tower Society, and members were permitted to meet in groups of up to 150 at Kingdom Halls and other places for worship. A branch office of Jehovah's Witnesses, with a print shop, was opened in Havana in the same year. In 1998, Witnesses were permitted to meet at larger conventions in major cities in Cuba.

== Santeria ==
The arrival and endurance of Santeria (also known as Regla de Ocha) in Cuba results from multiple contributing factors. The roots of Santeria stem from Nigeria and were transported to Cuba by way of the Lucumí people. However, the Lucumi people only consisted of about 8% of the overall slave population in Cuba from 1760 until about 1850. With such low numbers to draw upon, the religion was under constant attack in the form of dilution through more dominant numbers in the form of reproductive outsourcing and the cruelty inflicted through the employment of slavery.

Between 1800 and 1850 almost the entire population in Cuba consisted of people of African descent. This factor created a sense of uncertainty for plantation owners because of tensions amongst the slave population. The slave rivalries eventually resulted in an ever-rising loss in production. The method for combating the losses yielded that an increase in the Lucumi population would serve the plantation best. Lucumi people were known to be hard workers and mild-mannered.

As a result of the increasing import of slaves the population of the Lucumi rose sharply to about 34%. Attributing to the increase of Santeria was that many other slaves and freemen began to practice the religion of Santeria, thereby increasing the span of influence and affiliation in a more diverse manner. The disposition of colonialism brought a significant strain on all religions outside of Catholicism. Over the course of a 90-year span, the Lucumi maintained the practice of the religion of Santeria. The religion of Santeria encompasses sacrificial food, song, dance, costumes, spiritual deities, and the use of artifacts. In the beginning, the Lucumi and other worshippers of Santeria would have to practice in secret.

They would create hasty areas in which they would conduct the structuralized practice of Santeria and return to their colonial life after. However, the practice of Santeria on a more regular basis takes place not on the sugar plantations but in the urban areas. The syncretism that modernized Santeria was introduced when high-class mulattoes needed to find ways to alleviate ailments such as stress or sickness. There was no formal medical aid available to the community at the time. In light of this disposition, high-class Mulattoes pulled from whatever resources that they could find. They employed the practices of Christian-educated slaves with Afro-Cuban healers and Spanish curanderos.

The Afro-Cuban healers and Spanish curanderos served as the only medical practitioners in Cuba and were responsible for treating both the black and white population. The distance between the city and the countryside made it very difficult for slaves to participate in the syncretism of Santeria with Catholicism and Christianity. This was due to geography. Most of the European religious churches were located the urban areas or towns and to attend services would require traveling over long distances, which would interfere with sugar production. In the urban areas slaves worked alongside freemen and White Cubans in a less restricted atmosphere.

They were educated and trusted to perform skilled labor and given a great deal of responsibility. They served in several diverse jobs, which acted as a catalyst for the syncretism of Santeria with Catholicism and Christianity. Not every slave in Cuba complied with the employment of slavery. Cimarrones, as the Cuban slave owners labeled them, was a group of slaves who fled captivity and formed communities consisting of thousands of people. They took refuge in the wilderness and the mountains of Cuba where they maintained the practice of Santeria. They were considered a very serious threat to the colonial government's hold on slavery and oppression.

The Cimarrones were able to elude capture and provide aid and shelter to other escaped slaves. Over time, they developed the means to communicate with other surrounding secret camps via the plantation slaves and friendly White Cubans. Other slaves and freemen who lived in rural areas formed secret societies and groups in which they exercised their religious beliefs of Santeria out of public view to avoid colonial reform and oppression. After the abolishment of slavery Palenque, the Cimarrones establishment was converted into a town named El Cobre after surviving for fifty years.

In the religion of Santeria, the emphasis on conscious existence binds the understanding of nature, the higher powers, and the channels of lineage together through ritual practice and clairvoyance. The circle is a symbol that is divided into three sections that begin at the core with people and extend out into two other sections being ancestors and finally divinities. The significance of people at the inner core stand to represent the present day of existence and understanding in the form of perception within the individual as he or she can interpret the information surrounding them.

The outer layer of the ancestor represents the heritable understanding that the individual carries with them as a source of how and why to interpret values of perception within a given realm. The outmost layer that represents divinity is the value of knowledge, direction, and understanding that is acquired from Orishas and personal experience. The existence the circle represents is not a fixed plain of understanding but stands as an interchangeable ever-evolving and rotating sense of awareness and being. Santeria lineage is structured in the connection through Sibs (a group of kin) with each Sib being traced back to a common male ancestor linking the bloodlines to the religion. "There were three different routes for the transmission of Orisha worship. A child could inherit an Orisha from either its mother or father and continue their worship of it. In this case, a triangular relationship existed between the child, the parent, and the Orisha."

== Others ==
=== Islam ===
According to a 2011 Pew Research Center report, there were then 10,000 Muslims in Cuba who constitute 0.1% of the population. As of 2012, most of the 10,000 Cuban Muslims were converts to the religion. At a certain point, many Muslim students were entering the nation of Cuba interested in studying at Cuba's prestigious schools. The number of students was approximately 1500–2000. That group included students of Pakistani origin, among others. It is known that the dominant population that went to study in Cuba was the Pakistani students who were about 936 in strength. In 2001, Sheikh Muhammad bin Nassir Al-Aboudy, the Assistant Secretary-General of the Muslim World League (MWL) traveled to Cuba to obtain permission from the Cuban authorities to establish an Islamic organization that would support Cuba's Muslim community. Among the other aims of the proposed organization would be constructing mosques and the dissemination of Islamic culture among Muslims. As of July 2015, the Turkish Religious Affairs Foundation had opened the first prayer room for Cuban Muslims and the first mosque in Cuba was under construction with Turkish funding.

=== Judaism ===
Jews have lived on the island of Cuba for centuries. Some Cubans trace Jewish ancestry to Marranos (converts to Christianity) who came as colonists, though few of these practices Judaism today. More than 24,000 Jews lived in Cuba in 1924, and more immigrated to the country in the 1930s. But during and after the 1959 communist revolution, 94% of the Jews left for the United States and other countries. In 2007 an estimated 1,500 known Jewish Cubans remained in the country, overwhelmingly located in Havana, occasionally called Jubans as a portmanteau of the English word "Jew" and Cuban. Several hundred have since emigrated to Israel.

=== Hinduism ===
Hinduism is a minority religion in Cuba. Hinduism is followed by 0.2% of the population of Cuba. In 2007, Cuba had about 23,927 Hindus.

== Freedom of religion ==
During Cuba's republic years, religious practitioners, particularly those affiliated with Santeria, were criminalized and marginalized. During the communist revolution, Cuba cracked down significantly on all religious practices and declared the nation-state as atheist, as according to Fidel Castro, all religious activity was antithetical to the communist agenda. In 1991, The Communist Party lifted its prohibition against religious believers, declaring Cuba as a secular state rather than atheist. However, the ability for Cubans to practice their religion freely and openly is still under siege. In 2022, Freedom House rated Cuba's religious freedom as 3 out of 4, noting that religious freedom has improved over the past decade, but official obstacles still make it difficult for churches to operate without interference.

The Communist Party lifted its prohibition against religious believers in 1991. The constitution was reformed the following year, declaring Cuba a secular state instead of atheist.

All religious groups in the country are required to register with the Office of Religious Affairs (ORA), an entity within the Communist Party of Cuba (PCC) operating out of the Ministry of Justice. Failure to register a religious group that the ORA is considered a crime in Cuba. The Roman Catholic Church, which is the dominant church and religion in Cuba, has enjoyed more rights, such as the ability to periodically access state media and public spaces, distribute its own publications, and construct new churches.

Meanwhile, minority religious groups, such as Protestant, Evangelical, and Santeria groups, face restrictions imposed on their religion by the Cuban government. These minority groups have found it difficult to exercise their religious freedom, especially Cubans who practice Santeria. Although roughly 70 percent of Cubans practice some form of Santeria, the religion continues to be targeted by the government. Some of the actions taken by the government against practitioners of Santeria include arresting Santeria practitioners and promoting smear campaigns on social media aimed at defaming Santeria leaders. Despite the large number of Cubans who do practice Santeria and identify with the religion, the Cuban government has maintained its oppositional stance towards the religion.

Members of the Yoruba religion, which is a branch of Santeria, have had a particularly difficult time dealing with the government's repressive actions towards them. The Association of Free Yorubas of Cuba (Asociación de Yorubas Libres de Cuba) have had repeated conflicts with the Cuban government, as they refused to register with the Office of Religious Affairs. Their refusal was due to the fact that they did not want their group to be influenced by the Cuban government; however, this has led them to be especially vulnerable and face ongoing threats of criminal sanctions. The Free Yorubas group also has a history of encounters with law enforcement, as leaders and members of the group have been victims of harassment and arbitrary arrests.

Additionally, members of other religious minorities in Cuba are found more likely to be victims of religious persecution. Most of Cuba's Jewish population exists due to those individuals fleeing persecution from other countries, but the community drastically decreased in size after the rise of Castro, and the remaining community still faces some pushback from the government.

== See also ==
- Hinduism in Cuba
- Religion in Latin America
- Afro-Chinese religion in Cuba
