= Methodist Church in Cuba =

The Methodist Church in Cuba was established in 1883. In 2023, it had approximately 10,000 members and the head of the church is Bishop Ricardo Pereira.

== History ==
In 1883 the Methodist Episcopal Church (South) in the US started working with Cuban Methodists living in Florida. The first church was organized in Havana later that year. However, the Spanish-American War interrupted the work, and it was not until 1898 that American missionaries arrived in Cuba.

In 1964 the General Conference passed an enabling act to allow the Cuban Methodist Church to become autonomous if it wished. Autonomy was declared on February 2, 1968, and Rev. Armando Rodriguez elected as the First Cuban Bishop.

In the 1990s, the Florida Conference of the United Methodist Church and Methodist Church in Cuba met to discuss a partnership; a ministry called the Cuba/Florida Covenant (later called Methodists United in Prayer) was born from this meeting.

== 21st century ==
In 2023, the church had a membership of approximately 10,000 people, with another 30,000 attending church services.

In 1941, the church worked with other Christians to create the Evangelical Theological Seminary at Matanzas (SET), which opened in 1946. Preachers are trained with students from 12 other denominations.

== See also ==
- Religion in Cuba
- Christianity in Cuba
