= St. James Park (Bronx) =

Public park in the Bronx, New York

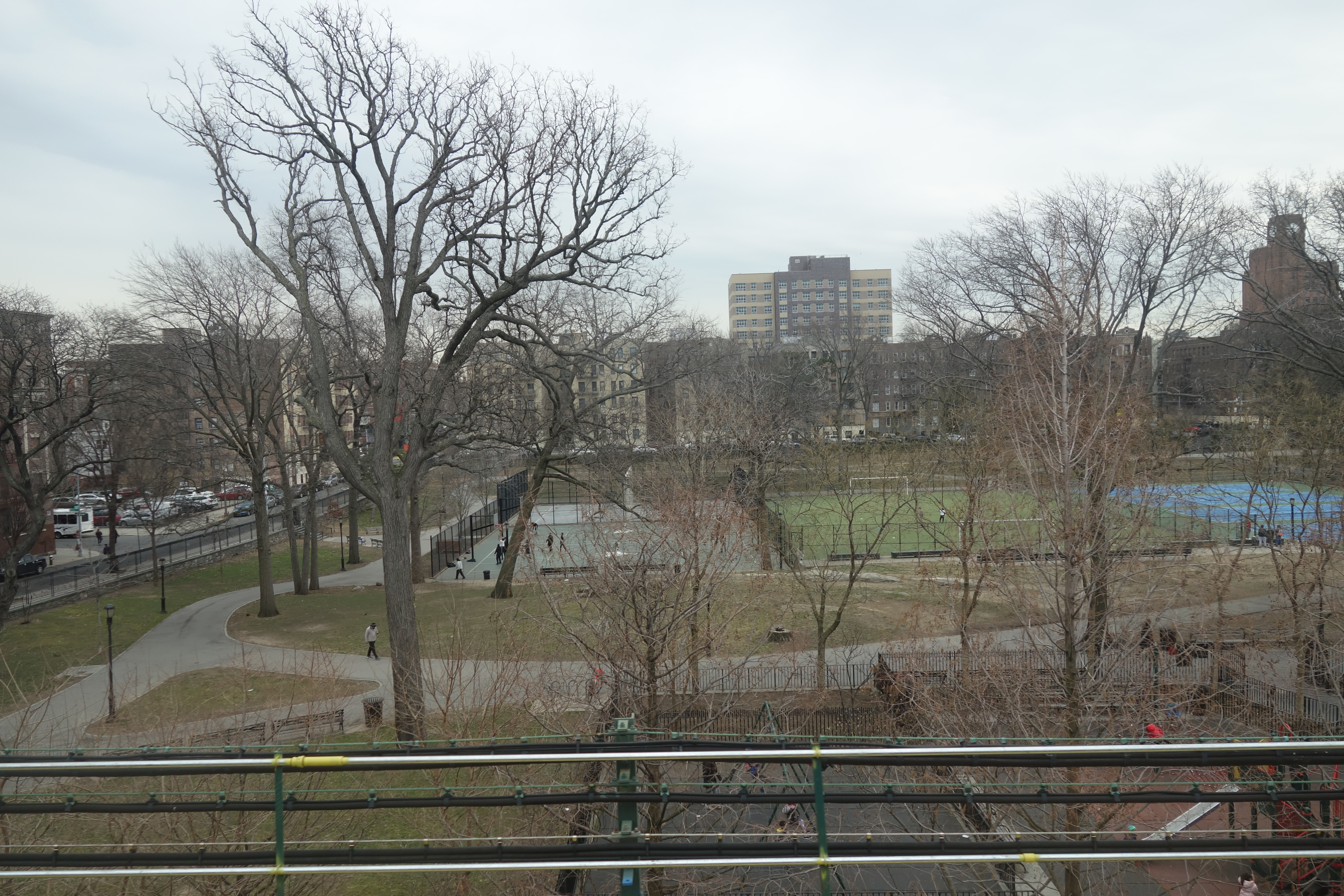
- View from a nearby 4 train

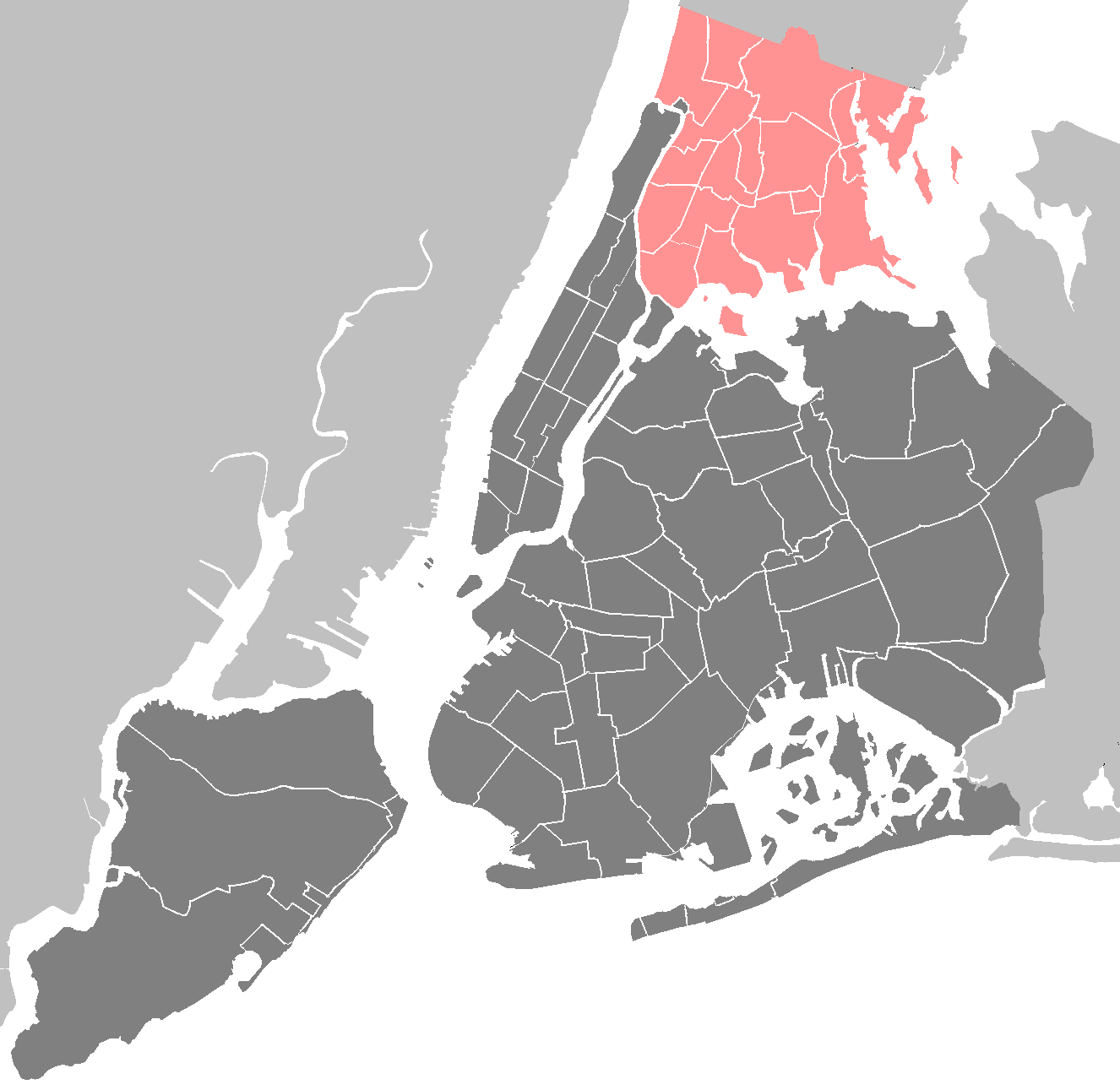
- Location within Bronx
- Type: Municipal park
- Location: Fordham, The Bronx, New York
- Coordinates: 40°51′54″N 73°53′52″W
- Area: 11.39 acres (4.61 ha)
- Opened: September 13, 1897; 128 years ago
- Etymology: St. James' Episcopal Church and Parish House
- Owner: New York City Department of Parks and Recreation
- Status: open all year
- Public transit: New York City Subway: at Fordham Road; at Fordham Road; New York City Bus: Bx1, Bx2, Bx9, Bx10, Bx12, Bx12 SBS, Bx22, Bx28, Bx34, BxM4; Metro-North Railroad: Harlem Line and New Haven Line at Fordham
- Facilities: recreation center, tennis courts, basketball courts, handball (American)
- Website: www.nycgovparks.org/parks/st-james-park

St. James Park is a public park in Fordham, Bronx, New York City. It is located in between Jerome Avenue and Creston Avenue. New York City purchased the land on September 13, 1897, graded it, and created the park. It is named after the neighboring St. James' Episcopal Church and Parish House. A recreation center, originally for senior citizens, was built in the park in 1974.
