= Howard Carroll =

Howard Carroll may refer to:

- Howard Joseph Carroll (1902–1960), American prelate of the Roman Catholic Church
- Howard W. Carroll (born 1942), American lawyer and politician
- Howard Carroll (newspaperman) (1854–1916), who owned the Carrollcliffe mansion in Tarrytown, New York
- Howard Carroll (1924–2017), musician of the Dixie Hummingbirds
