= Myrna Colón =

Puerto Rican academic administrator (born 1948)

President of Adventist University of the Antilles
- Incumbent
- Assumed office April 2022
- Preceded by: Obed Jiménez
- In office February 1996 – June 2001
- Preceded by: Israel Recio (interim)
- Succeeded by: Myrna Costa

Personal details
- Born: September 5, 1948 (age 77) New York City, U.S.
- Children: 1
- Education: University of Puerto Rico; Andrews University

Myrna Colón-Contreras (born September 5, 1948) is a Puerto Rican academic administrator serving as president of the Adventist University of the Antilles.

== Life ==
Colón was born September 5, 1948, in New York City. She completed a B.A. in secondary education (1970) and a M.A. in school administration and supervision (1979) from the University of Puerto Rico. Colón married Agustin Contreras and they had a daughter. He died June 21, 1985. She earned an Ed.S. (1989) and Ph.D. (1992) in curriculum and instruction at Andrews University. Her dissertation was titled, Hispanic Student Teachers' Practice Teaching in Cooperative Learning: Two Qualitative Case Studies. William H. Green was Colón's doctoral advisor.

While in college, Colón worked as a secondary teacher in Puerto Rico and Venezuela. She was a school principal from 1984 to 1986 and a superintendent from 1986 to 1989. She became an associate professor and director of the education department at Adventist University of the Antilles (AAU) in 1989. In February 1996, Colón succeeded interim president Israel Recio as president of AAU. She is the first female president of the university. Colón served in the role until June 2001 when she was succeeded by Myrna Costa. In 2012, she became the vice president of academic affairs at AAU. Colón became president of AAU for the second time on April 16, 2022. She succeeded Obed Jiménez.
