= West Presbyterian Church =

Church in Manhattan, New York

West Presbyterian Church was a congregation and two houses of worship in Manhattan, New York City. The congregation was founded in 1829 and merged in 1911 with Park Presbyterian Church to form West-Park Presbyterian Church. The first house of worship, also known as the Carmine Street Presbyterian Church, in Greenwich Village, was used from 1832 to 1865, and the second, on West 42nd Street between Fifth Avenue and Sixth Avenue, from 1865 until 1911, when it was sold and demolished. Proceeds from the sale were used, in accordance with the merger agreement, to build and endow a church for an underserved neighborhood, Washington Heights: Fort Washington Presbyterian Church. In addition, the West Church congregation had earlier established two mission churches which eventually merged to become Good Shepherd-Faith Presbyterian Church. West-Park, Fort Washington, and Good Shepherd-Faith are all active today.

West Church's most prominent pastors were Thomas S. Hastings, 1856–1881, who later became President of Union Theological Seminary, and John R. Paxton, 1882–1893, whose popular sermons attracted, for a time, many wealthy and powerful businessmen as members.

== Carmine Street Church ==
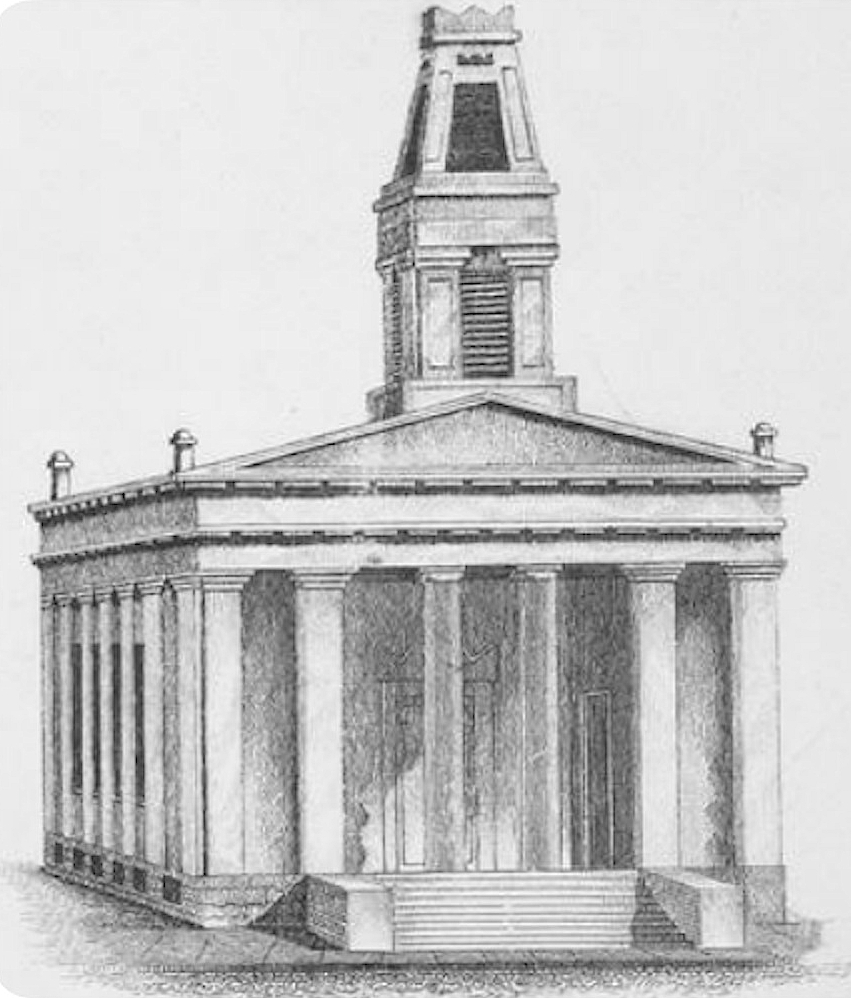
Church on Carmine Street, 1831

On November 1, 1829, a Presbyterian church was organized, called the North Church, which met for worship on Sixth Avenue, near Amity (today called West 3rd) Street. In 1831, a division took place, and eighteen members moved to a nearby location. They were known as the West Church. In June of that year, the remainder were organized anew as the North Church, and on July 5, Rev. Ebenezer Mason was installed as its pastor; he resigned in February 1833. After this the North Church was scattered, and dissolved in 1835.

The West Church incorporated in July 1831, holding services in a room at 273 Bleecker Street. They built a house of worship on Carmine Street, designed by Town & Davis in Greek Revival style, of brick plastered to resemble white stone. It measured 84 by 62 feet, had 136 pews on the lower floor, and was topped by a wooden turret, with heavy moldings, about 30 feet high. The church was dedicated May 27, 1832, when Rev. David R. Downer was installed as pastor, with only 32 members. By the time Downer died (of tuberculosis, age 33) in 1841, the membership was several hundred.

Revs. Edwin Holt, 1842–46, and then Thomas H. Skinner Jr., 1846–1856, succeeded Downer.

In 1848, when it was estimated that New York City had 10,000 indigent children, the Carmine Street Church initiated regular "Boys' Meetings"—religious services—for them. The program's success inspired nine other New York City groups to establish similar programs. In 1853, leaders of these programs founded the Children's Aid Society, with Charles Loring Brace, of the West Church, as secretary. It continues today.

== Thomas S. Hastings ==
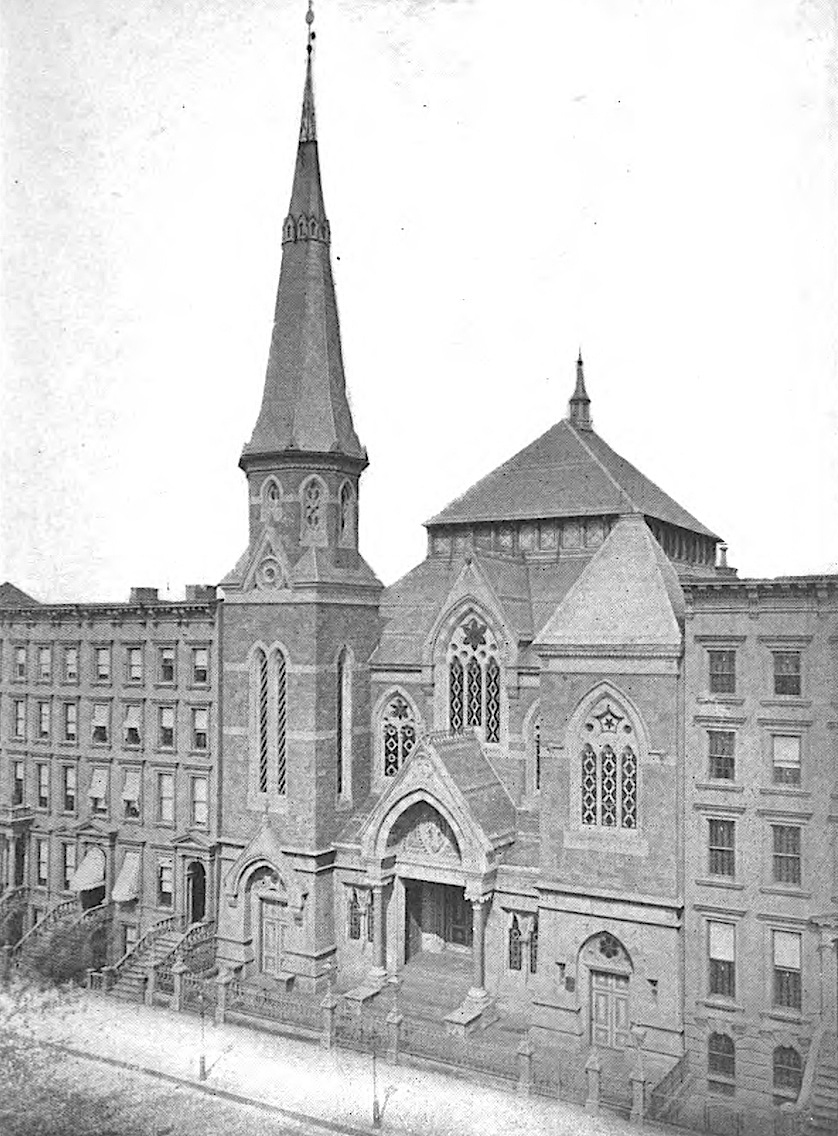
Church on 42nd Street, 1876

In 1856, Rev. Thomas S. Hastings became pastor. The congregation grew steadily until in 1860 it had need of larger quarters, and Hastings moved his congregation to West 42nd Street, where there was much room and land was relatively cheap.

The trustees first engaged the chapel of Rutgers Female Institute on 42nd Street between Fifth and Sixth Avenues. A new chapel, designed by Foster & Babb (George Fletcher Babb and Nathaniel G. Foster), was built and dedicated in 1862. The new church, designed by Jacob Wrey Mould in Victorian Gothic style, was dedicated in 1865 on the Rutgers site.

Thomas Samuel Hastings was born in Utica, N. Y., August 28, 1827, son of the well-known church musician Thomas Hastings. He graduated from Hamilton College in 1848 and from Union Theological Seminary in 1851. His first pastorate was in Mendham, N. J., from 1852 to 1856, when he was called to the pastorate of West Church. Rev. Hastings received the Doctor of Divinity degree from the University of the City of New York in 1865.

In 1881, Hastings ended his 25-year-long pastorate at West to join the faculty of Union Theological Seminary, where he remained for another quarter century, during which he served from 1888 to 1897 as the school's president. Rev. Dr. Hastings died suddenly at home on April 2, 1911, age 83.

== John R. Paxton ==
The West Presbyterian Church attained its greatest success during the pastorate of Rev. Dr. John R. Paxton, who served from 1882 to 1893. His vigorous sermons gave the church a great vogue. It was crowded to the doors at every service, and his preaching attracted Jay Gould and Russell Sage. Associated with the church in its heyday were J. Hood Wright, Alfred H. Smith, Frank A. Munsey, Henry Flagler, and Gen. Horace Porter, among many rich and influential men. In the early 1890s, it was said that a score or so of members represented $750 million.

John Randolph Paxton was born in Canonsburg, Pennsylvania, in 1843 and attended Jefferson College there. When the Civil War broke out he enlisted in the Army, fighting three years and rising to the rank of captain, following which he returned to college and graduated in 1866. He attended Western Theological Seminary, and after pastorates in Maryland, Harrisburg, and Washington, D.C., he was called to West Church. He received a Doctor of Divinity degree from Washington & Jefferson College.

In 1893, Dr. Paxton's sermons, always supportive of the wealthy in the past, appeared less so. (The year had seen a bank panic and the beginning of a serious economic depression.) He also became ill. After he submitted his resignation, and later changed his mind, charges and denials of intrigue against him were reported in The New York Times. Rumors of substance abuse and odd behavior were published. Finally, his resignation was accepted, effective December 31.

According to news reports, Paxton struggled frequently with health problems over ensuing years. He gave occasional sermons, lectures and dinner speeches and served several months as pastor of the New York Presbyterian Church (today a Baptist church) at 128th Street and Seventh Avenue in 1897–98, but had no other pastorates. He died at home April 11, 1923, at age 79, a very wealthy man.

== Anthony H. Evans ==
After nearly two years without a pastor, West Church chose Rev. Anthony Harrison Evans to replace Paxton. Born in North Wales, he resettled with his family in upstate New York in 1870. He graduated from Hamilton College in 1882 and from Union Theological Seminary in 1888. His first pastorate was in Lockport, N. Y., where he had served for six years when called by West Church, whose leaders expressed confidence he would build up the church to its past prosperity by attracting wealthy members.

By 1899, the finances of the church were deteriorating, and some leaders, holding him responsible, maneuvered to remove him. An internal battle ensued, which he ultimately won.

In 1902, with new financial supporters and its finances said to be strong, the church announced an ambitious plan to build a parish house for institutional work on its 43rd Street side, to modernize the auditorium, and to replace the 42nd Street front with a better-looking one; but nothing came of it.

By the early twentieth century, commercialization of the church's midtown location led to the displacement of the area's residential population and the loss of many of West Presbyterian's members. In 1911, the church and a competitor, the Park Presbyterian Church at West 86th Street and Amsterdam Avenue, announced their consolidation under the name West-Park Presbyterian Church. They also announced plans for construction of a new sanctuary, Fort Washington Presbyterian Church, at 174th Street and Wadsworth Avenue, to serve the Washington Heights neighborhood. The latter was designed by the son and namesake of Rev. Hastings; it remained affiliated with West-Park until 1923.

The 42nd Street property was sold to the Aeolian Company for a new building to house their offices and a concert hall. The last service was held on Sunday, June 4, 1911, and a demolition permit was issued June 7. The Aeolian Hall building opened October 13, 1912.

In accordance with the merger agreement, Rev. Dr. Evans and his Park Church counterpart, Rev. Dr. Anson Phelps Atterbury, served as co-pastors at West-Park. Atterbury retired in 1918, becoming pastor emeritus, and Evans was sole active pastor until his death in 1942 at age 80.

== Mission churches ==
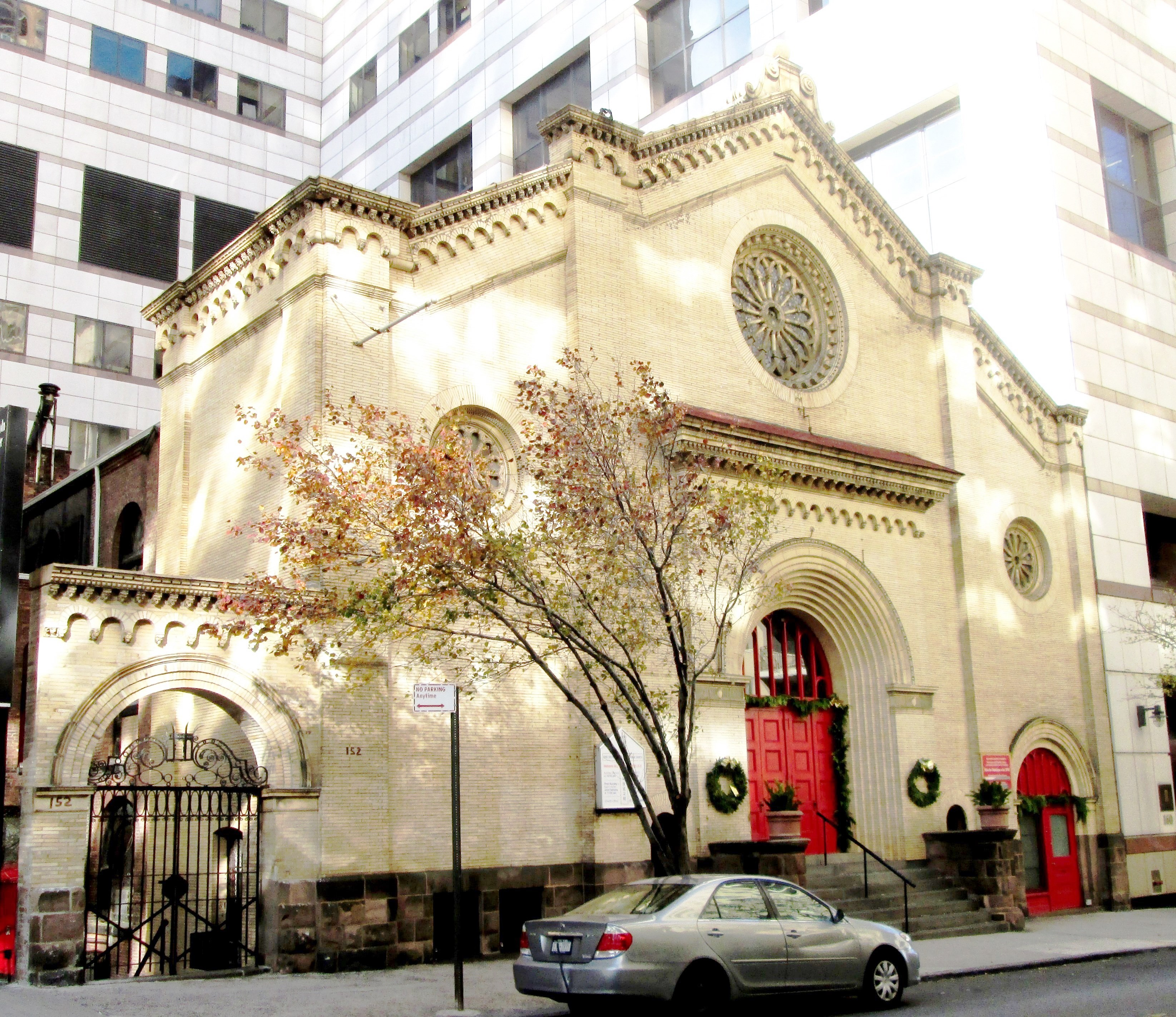
Good Shepherd-Faith Presbyterian Church, 2016

In 1866, West Church adopted a nearby mission founded by a Reformed Church five years earlier, and in 1870 began construction of a church for it at 423 West 46th Street, a poor, immigrant section. Designed by Edward D. Lindsey in Victorian Gothic style and dedicated in 1872, it was named Faith Chapel in 1873. Ten years later, it became fully independent as Faith Church. In 1897 it moved a few blocks away to 359 West 48th Street, and the 46th Street edifice became St. Cornelius Episcopal Church. That building, since a 1920 merger with St. Clement's Episcopal Church, formerly of West 3rd Street, has been known by the latter's name. Rev. James H. Hoadley, D.D., was pastor of Faith Chapel/Church from 1873 to 1900.

Rev. Paxton began a mission Sunday School in 1886 at 1019 Tenth Avenue, a store near 65th Street, and soon initiated a fund-raising drive for a new mission church, later named Church of the Good Shepherd, at 152 West 66th Street. Designed by J. C. Cady in Italian Romanesque Revival style, it was occupied when the basement was finished in 1887 but not dedicated until February 6, 1893. Rev. Daniel E. Lorenz, Ph.D., was pastor from 1887 to 1922. The church became independent (of West-Park) in 1914.

In 1943, Good Shepherd Church merged with Faith Church, which gave up its 48th Street building, to become Good Shepherd-Faith Presbyterian Church.
