= Henry Franklin Kilburn =

American architect

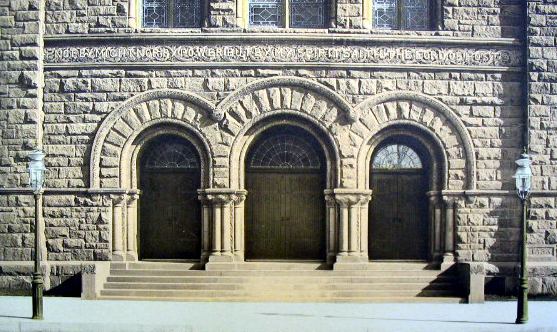
- West-Park Presbyterian Church, Amsterdam Avenue Facade Entrance, Upper West Side, New York City, 1889
- Born: February 20, 1844; Ashfield, Massachusetts
- Died: September 26, 1905 (aged 61); New York City, New York
- Known for: Architect

Henry Franklin Kilburn, FAIA, (February 20, 1844 in Ashfield, Massachusetts – September 26, 1905 in New York City) was an American architect active in late-nineteenth- and early-twentieth-century New York City who is particularly associated with church architecture. Although he practiced for a number of years, only toward the end of his career, however, was Kilburn primarily active with ecclesiastical commissions; the New York City Landmarks Preservation Commission reports that "Kilburn was also the architect of many private residences, factories, stables, and theaters in Manhattan."

== Life ==
Born in Ashfield, Massachusetts, Kilburn served in the Union Army during the American Civil War. After the war, he went to study and practice architecture in Northampton, Massachusetts. Around 1869, at the age of twenty-five, he set up a practice in New York City and was elected a practicing member of the New York Chapter of the American Institute of Architects in 1896. "He was a member of the Architectural League of New York and a number of clubs and associations. He was elected an Associate of the American Institute of Architects in 1886 and a Fellow in 1889."

Much of Kilburn's work has not survived, and that which has, has been under threat of demolition or general dilapidation for many years. He worked in a variety of styles, producing all derivative work of other fashionable architect's styles, including Richardsonian Romanesque and Stanford White's refined Italianate style. This was often due to his designing the more substantial additions or extensions of buildings. He established his practice in New York City around 1865.

== Works ==
- Hampshire County Courthouse (Northampton, Mass.) (completed 1886), 99 Main Street
- Mt. Moriah Baptist Church (New York City) (1888), 2050 Fifth Avenue
- West-Park Presbyterian Church (1889–1890), New York City, New York (Here he did the main corner church, an extension and stylistic continuation of Leopold Eidlitz's earlier "muscular" Romanesque chapel, built for around $100,000.)
- St. James Episcopal Church Parish House (Bronx, New York) (1891–1892), 2500 Jerome Avenue (designated a New York City Landmark)
- West End Presbyterian Church (1891), Amsterdam Ave. & 105th St. New York
- Colonial Club, 127 West 72nd Street (1892, demolished c.2006), New York City
- Residence of Mrs. Katherine Lorillard Kernochan, (c1896, demolished c.1927 for construction of 825 Fifth Avenue) 824 Fifth Avenue, New York City.
- Carrollcliffe (1897–1910), a large private residence in Tarrytown, NY built to resemble a European castle.
- Pabst Hotel (1899, demolished 1902), 153 West 42nd Street, Manhattan
- Durland Riding Academy (New York City) (1900–1901), 8 West 67th Street, Upper West Side, in the Upper West Side/Central Park West Historic District)
- Street and Smith Publishing House (1904), a seven-story brick and stone publishing house on the northeast corner of Seventh Avenue and 15th Street (built for Street & Smith on 231 William Street for $225,000)
- Residence of Walter A. and Jean S. Bass (1890), 615 Little Silver Point Road, Little Silver, NJ (With the firm A.L.C Marsh and Associates. Cost of $4480)
- Clapp Memorial Library (Belchertown, MA) (1887), 19 South Main St.

== Gallery ==
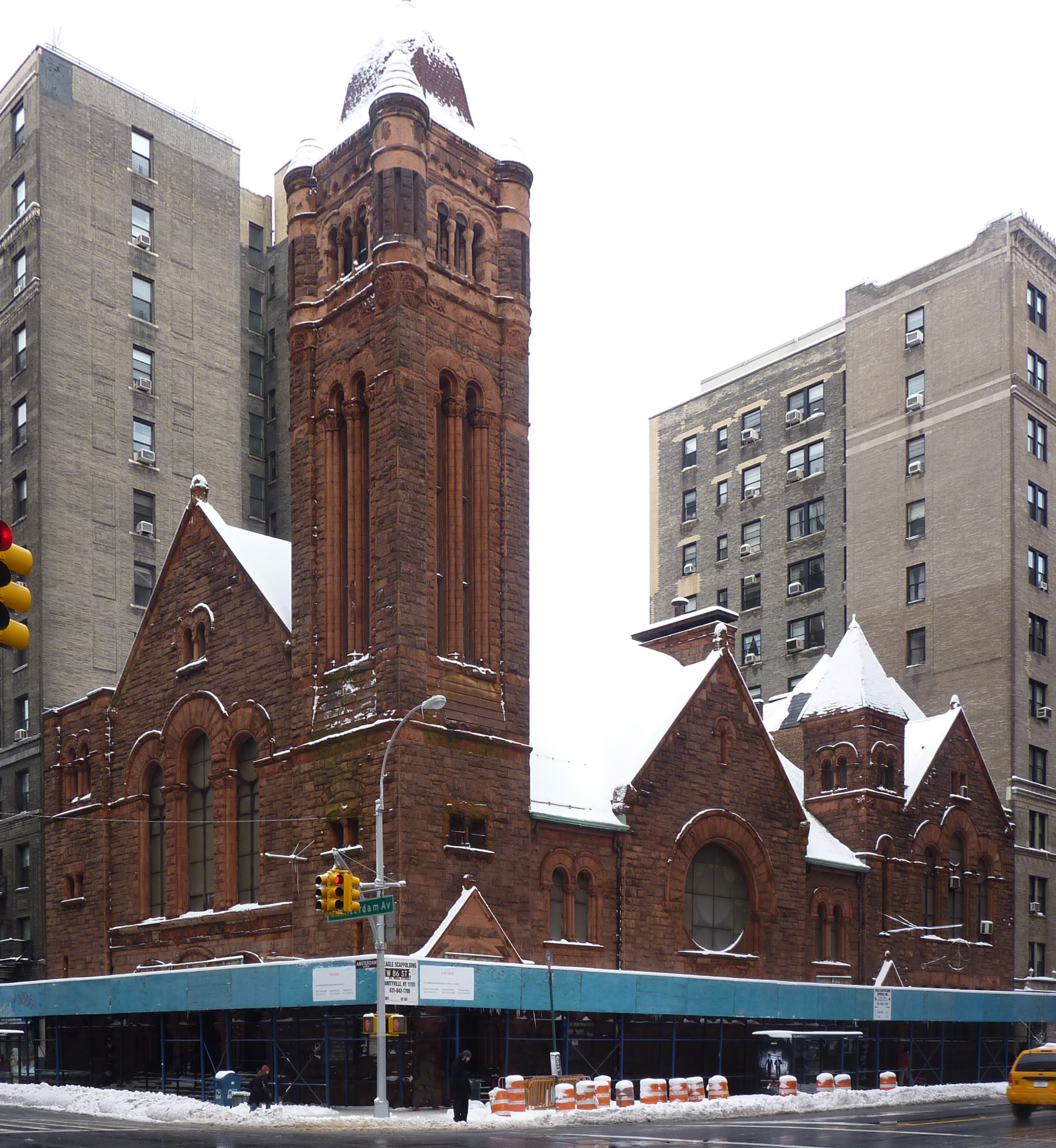
West-Park Presbyterian Church, New York City (in 2010)

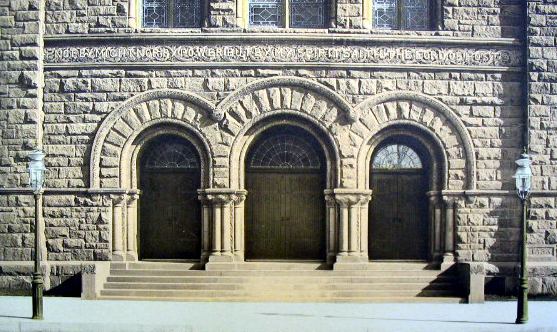
West-Park Presbyterian Church entrance detail (in 1891)

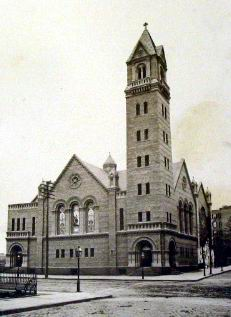
West End Presbyterian Church, New York City (in 1893)

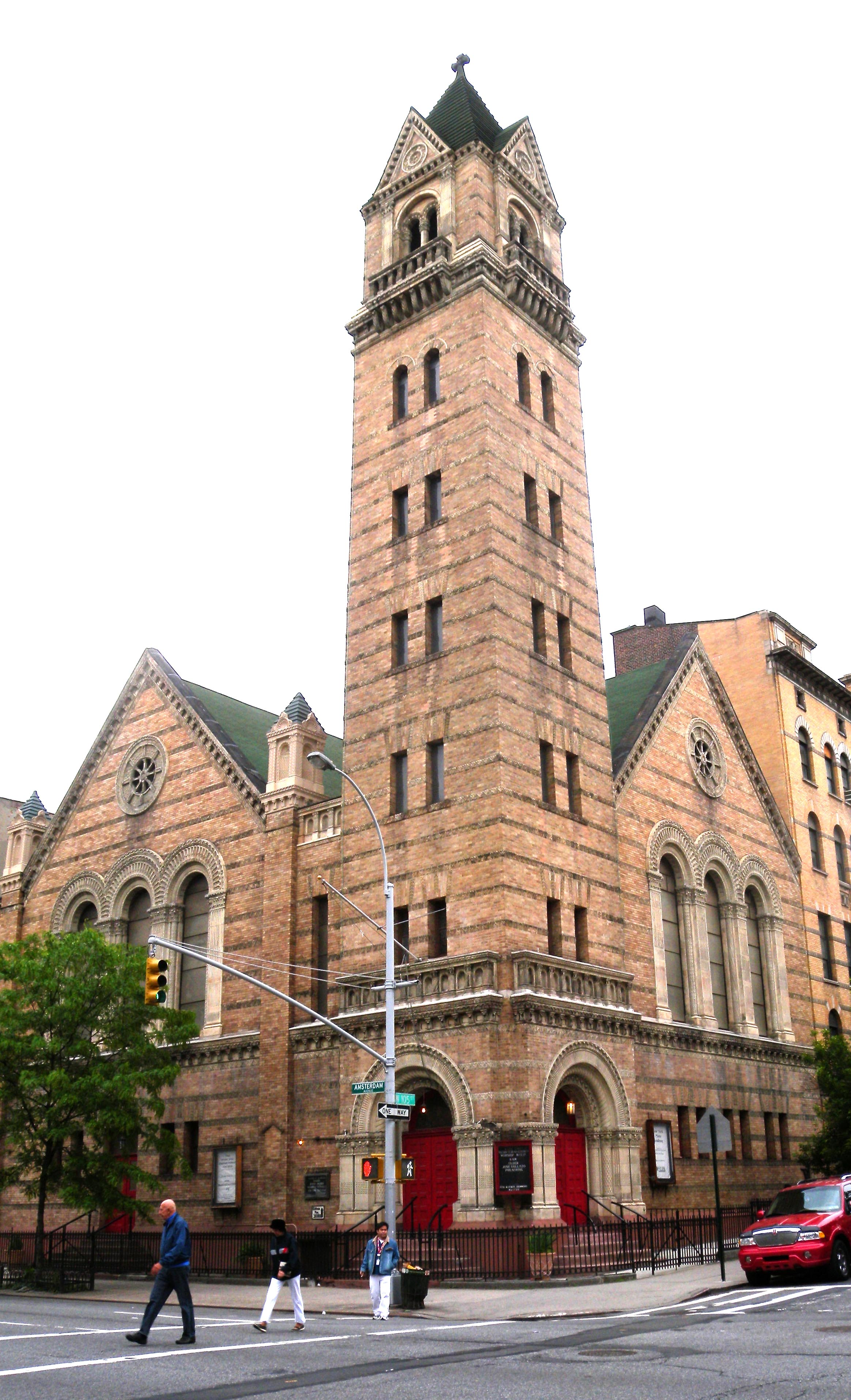
West End Presbyterian Church, New York City (in 2009)

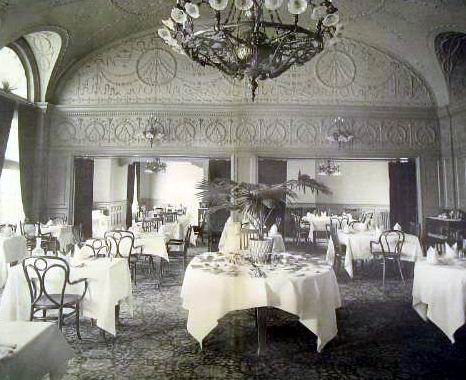
The Colonial Club Dining Room (photographed in 1894 before its demolition in 2006)

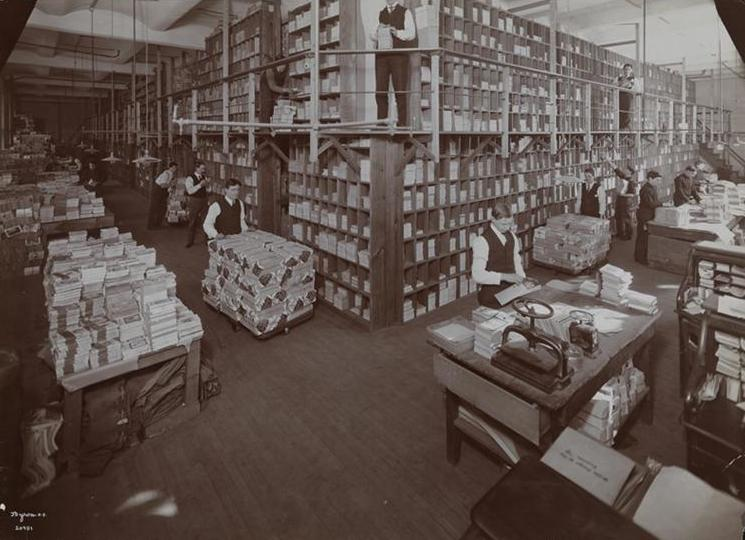
Street & Smith Book Department (in 1906)

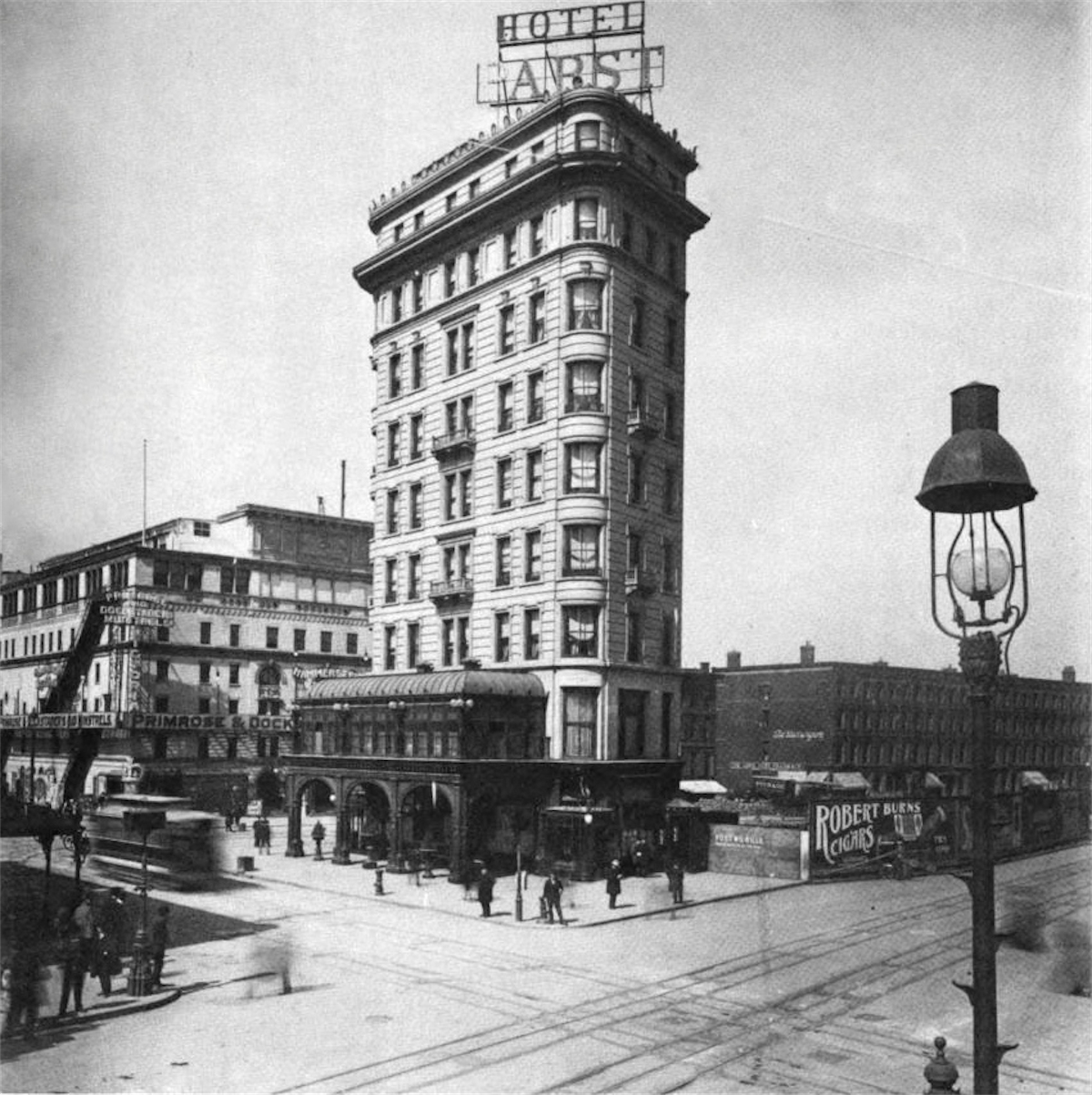
Pabst Hotel, 42nd Street, New York City (in 1902)
