= West-Park Presbyterian Church =

Church in Manhattan, New York

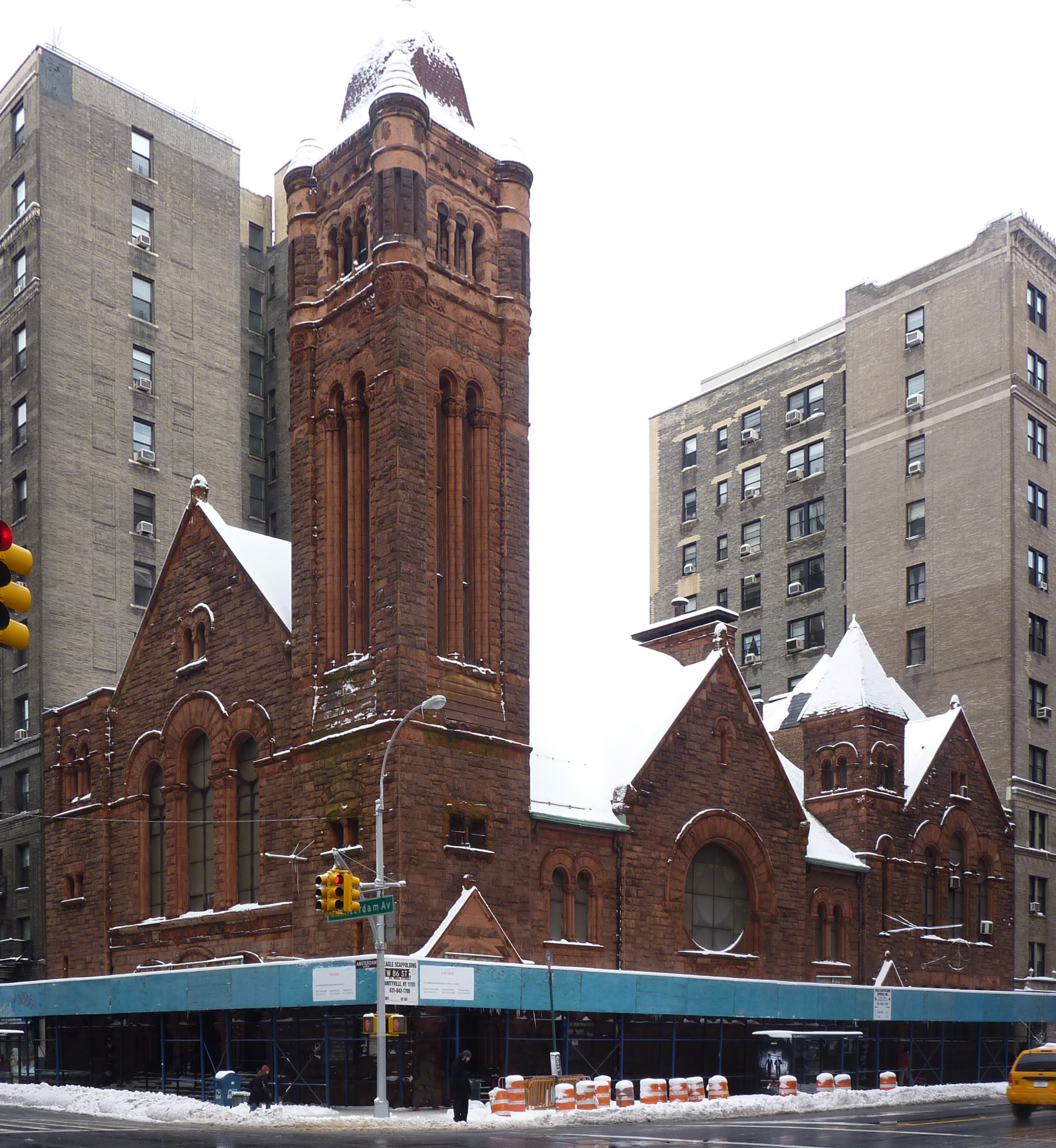
- View from the corner of Amsterdam Avenue and 86th Street

General information
- Architectural style: Richardsonian Romanesque / Romanesque Revival
- Location: New York, New York, United States
- Coordinates: 40°47′16″N 73°58′29″W
- Construction started: 1889
- Completed: 1884, 1890
- Cost: ? (1884) $100,000+ (1890)
- Client: The Presbytery of New York

Technical details
- Structural system: Brown and red sandstone masonry

Design and construction
- Architects: Leopold Eidlitz; Henry Franklin Kilburn

Website
- www.westparkpresbyterian.org

West-Park Presbyterian Church is a Romanesque Revival Presbyterian church located on the corner of Amsterdam Avenue at 86th Street on the Upper West Side of Manhattan in New York City. The church consists of a main sanctuary and chapel.

== Congregation history ==
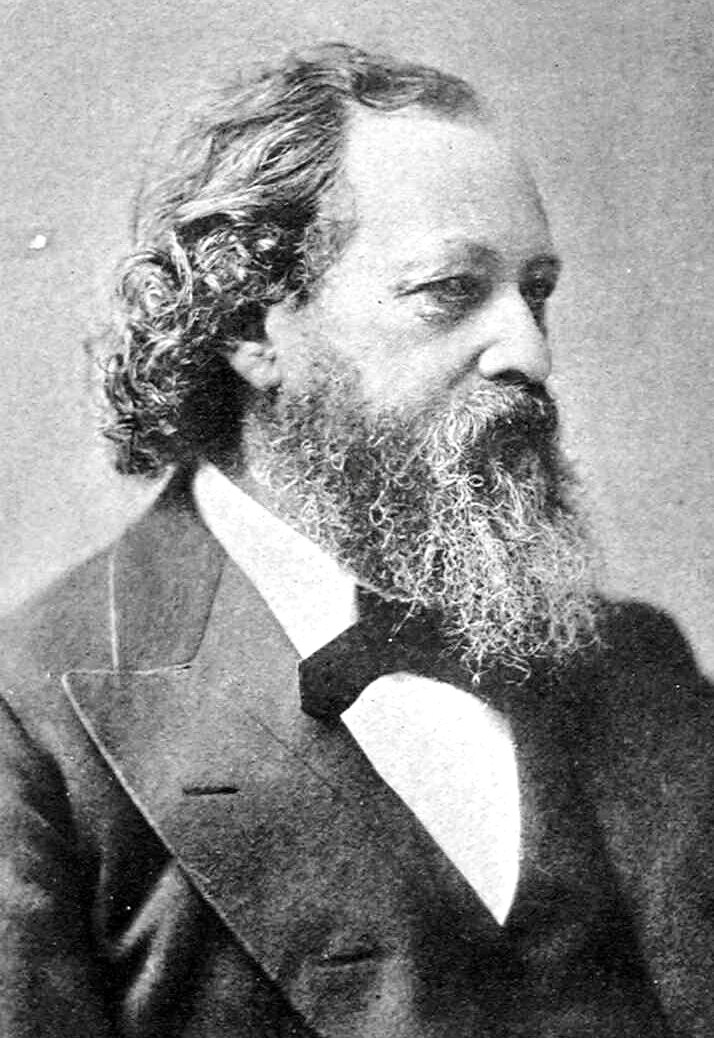
Leopold Eidlitz, portrait published in Architectural Record in 1908

The congregation was founded in 1852 as the 84th Street Presbyterian Church, building its first chapel of timber in 1854 on 84th Street and West End Avenue, to designs by one of the city's most prominent architects, Prague-born Leopold Eidlitz. The church changed its name to Park Presbyterian Church in 1887. The name became West-Park Presbyterian (alternatively spelled West Park) when the midtown West Presbyterian Church (founded 1829) merged with Park Presbyterian in 1911.

== Church building ==
The small congregation moved north in Upper Manhattan. Upon moving to the Upper West Side, one wealthy new pastor (from 1879), Anson Phelps Atterbury (1855–1931), proposed a grand church in the hopes that the congregation would expand along with the rest of the neighborhood. That pastor commissioned Leopold Eidlitz to build a diminutive midblock brick Romanesque Revival chapel in 1884, a style Eidlitz described as "muscular" Romanesque and considered appropriate to an evangelical Protestant church. After a further $100,000 was raised, the main sanctuary was built in 1889–90 on the abutting corner site, to designs by Henry Franklin Kilburn in intricately carved brown and red sandstone in a stylistic continuation of Eidlitz's Romanesque chapel but re-cladding that brick chapel in sandstone and adding an offset diminutive tower. The corner features a giant ribbed bell-domed belltower, which dominates the neighborhood and if not for the competing heights of apartment towers "would be one of the West Side's loveliest landmarks," according to the AIA Guide to NYC.

In 2016, the church hosted SONNET REMIX 2, a celebration of Shakespeare's Sonnets featuring artists presenting the sonnets including Stairwell Theater, Carman Moore, Jason Trachtenburg, Joel Gold, Ariana Karp, Matt and Rafferty of Evolfo.

== Preservation ==
Bird's eye roof detail

In the 1980s, the church was re-pointed with cement, which has resulted in substantial erosion of the soft sandstone. Around the same time, the church installed a new elevator for handicap accessibility in the parish house (the original chapel).

In the early 2000s, the congregation hired a developer to address their financial situation, diminished attendance, and role in society. Their findings proposed the replacement of the complex with an eighteen- to twenty-three-story residential tower and a smaller new corner glass church, designed by the architectural firm of Franke, Gottsegen & Cox. The design featured a "prow-shaped base of stone," with a sweeping 125-foot glass carillon tower providing "a luminous well of light." The current social outreach and education facilities would be doubled and the modern design, the architects asserted, would create a sense of refuge and "communitarian communality." The architects described the design: "...the crisscrossing of the structure, like a canopy of trees, but you won't be able to see the top, which we think is an expression of sacredness," adding, "the sanctuary is very flexible and interfaith use is possible so that space can be shared with other denominations."

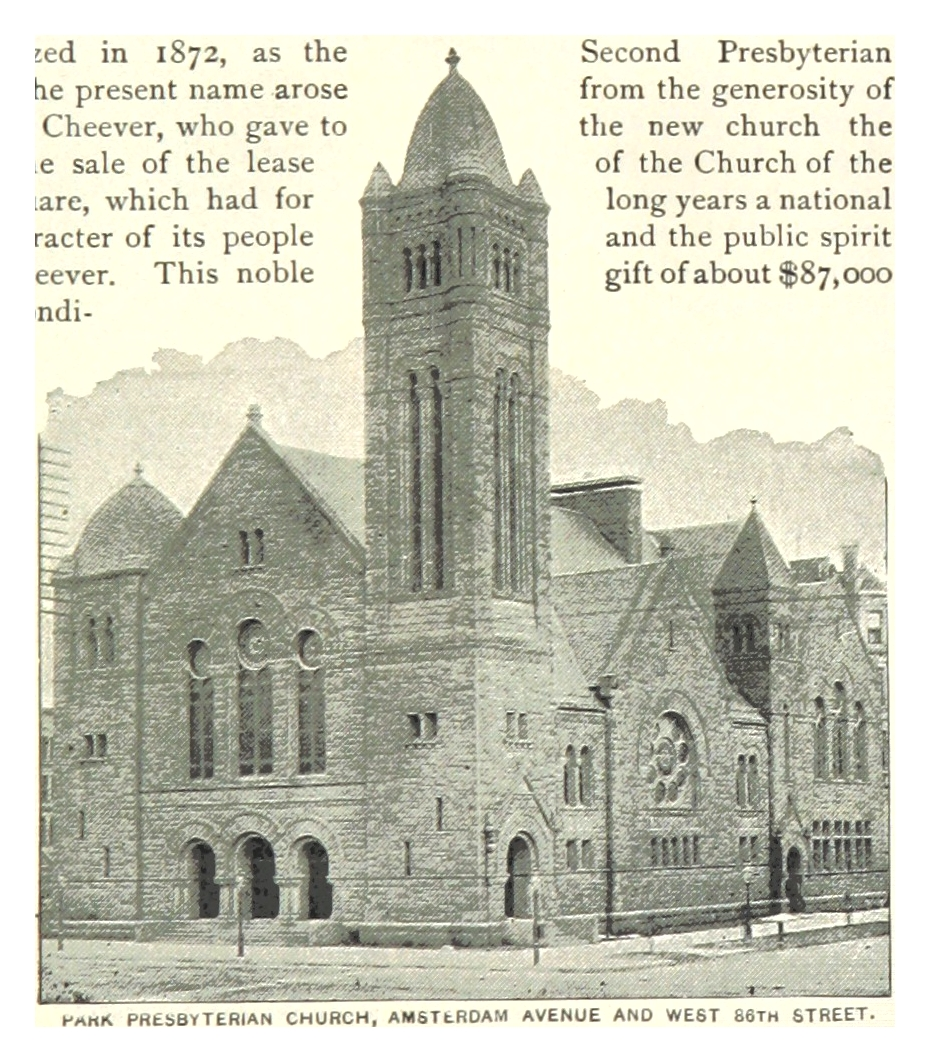
1893

In response, activists organized the "Friends of West-Park" to protest the development while concurrently working toward a viable alternative plan as well as funds. The group principally feared the loss of air and light with the new tower. The co-chairman of Friends of West-Park stated that the group was not interested "in telling the church that it had to maintain itself for the community good without the community taking some role [but instead they] formed a development company capable of doing what [they] say and working on a partnership with the church." The "Friends" suggested selling Eidlitz's chapel for redevelopment to a non-profit, probably a school, to offset the cost of renovation, with neighboring buildings preparing to lease air rights. Most of the external walls would be preserved, restoring the sandstone and stained glass but not the original roof shape nor the forty-foot interior, which would be gutted. Its sanctuary would be raised to gallery level and fitted with movable seating; since divided windows already exist, the alteration would not be externally evident, leaving the commercially ideal ground floor for other uses, possibly social outreach or educational. One architect responsible for the sympathetic second plan explained that "successful rehabilitation allows the character and original intent of the first architect to come through. So the question is, If not every square inch is sacred turf, how much modification can the structure bear without losing what makes it special?" Rev. Brashear of West-Park was quoted as receptive to the community input but stated that the congregation, trustees, and various levels of the Presbytery are still deciding the unprotected church's fate.

The congregation moved to share space in 2008 with the neighboring Renaissance Revival-styled, Saints Paul and Andrew United Methodist Church (1897), protected as a city landmark and itself a product of a 1937 denominational merger.

The church was designated as an Individual Landmark by the New York City Landmarks Preservation Commission (LPC) on January 12, 2010.

=== Demolition proposal ===
By 2020, West-Park's congregation had been reduced to 12 members, prompting them to vote to sell their building to a developer. In exchange, the developer would replace the existing church with a new building that would contain 10,000 square feet (930 m^{2}) for the congregation. In April 2022, it was announced that the West-Park congregation would seek permission to demolish the building under the hardship provision of the New York Landmarks Law, citing their inability to provide or source funds for repairs. The building had been surrounded since 2001 by a sidewalk shed that shielded pedestrians from potential falling masonry, and the congregation had paid $45,000 in fines since 1993. The congregation initially estimated the cost of repairs at $30–50 million, but this figure was disputed by the neighborhood's council member, Gale Brewer. A successful appeal would allow for the sale of the church site to Alchemy Properties, who will replace the existing structure with a residential building that incorporates worship space for the congregation. Opponents of the demolition included actors Matt Damon, Mark Ruffalo, and Wendell Pierce; rapper Common; and filmmaker Kenneth Lonergan.

An independent analysis published in October 2023 found that the church would be very expensive to repair. West-Park temporarily withdrew its application to demolish the church in January 2024. Celebrities and residents had resumed their preservation efforts by 2025, and the New York Court of Appeals ruled in June 2025 that the church's community center, the Center at West Park, could be evicted. Afterward, the Center at West Park asked local lawmakers to intervene, and they were given a final eviction notice that July. Following further community meetings regarding West-Park, Manhattan Community Board 7 voted in October 2025 to recommend against demolition, and the LPC hosted a hearing that December to determine whether the demolition should be approved. In July 2026, the Center at West Park offered to preserve the church by paying $60,000 in monthly rent for ten years, or a total of $7.2 million.

== See also ==
- National Register of Historic Places listings in Manhattan from 59th to 110th Streets
- List of New York City Designated Landmarks in Manhattan from 59th to 110th Streets
