= Inter-American Adventist Theological Seminary =

Seventh-day Adventist seminary

- Type: Private
- Established: 1996
- Religious affiliation: Seventh-day Adventist Church
- Academic affiliations: Andrews University
- President: Efraín Velázquez II
- Students: 566
- Location: Miami, Florida, U.S.

Inter-American Adventist Theological Seminary (IATS) is an educational institution of the Inter‐American Division of the Seventh-day Adventists tasked with equipping ministers within the division with advanced degrees to better serve the church. IATS is administered from the church's divisional headquarters in Miami, Fl, but classes are taught at several of the church-run universities within the territory. It is accredited by the US-based Association of Theological Schools (ATS) and The Accrediting Association of Seventh-day Adventist Schools, Colleges, and Universities (AAA).

== History ==
IATS traces its roots to the 1970s when in order to halt the brain-drain of talented ministers to North America SDA colleges within the Inter-American Division (IAD) territory (nations and islands in and/or bordering the Caribbean Sea, including Mexico and the Guianas) began forging relationships with Andrews University in the United States to offer graduate programs in the area. These relationships grew into a formal arrangement between the IAD and the SDA Theological Seminary at Andrews University that allowed ultimately ten campuses within the IAD territory to offer graduate degrees in Theology and Religion. The program was very successful but the costs were prohibitive, so in 1996 IAD voted to formally wean itself off Andrews University by establishing IATS which graduated its first ministerial doctorates in 2007 and won full accreditation in 2011.

== Centers ==
IATS courses are taught on the following IAD campuses:

- Colombia Adventist University—Colombia
- Central American Adventist University —Costa Rica
- Cuba Adventist Seminary—Cuba
- Dominican Adventist University—Dominican Republic
- Haitian Adventist University—Haiti
- Northern Caribbean University—Jamaica
- University of Montemorelos—Mexico
- Antillean Adventist University—Puerto Rico
- University of the Southern Caribbean—Trinidad
- Venezuelan Adventist University—Venezuela

== Programs ==
IATS offers the following accredited degree programs:

- Master of Arts (MA) in Pastoral Theology.
- Master of Arts in Religion.
- Doctor of Ministry (D.Min.) (Mexico, Jamaica and Costa Rica)

== See also ==
- List of Seventh-day Adventist colleges and universities
