= Christianity in Cuba =

Christianity has played an important role in Cuba's history. Cuba was discovered by Christopher Columbus a few days after he arrived to the New World in 1492. In 1511, colonization began when the Conquistador Diego Velázquez de Cuéllar established the Catholic Church in Cuba with the early priest Fray Bartolomé de las Casas known commonly as "the Protector of the Indians". Along with Catholicism, Protestantism came during the same time.

Catholicism was established early while Protestantism came later. "Protestantism did not permanently take hold in Cuba until the nineteenth century, though since the sixteenth century the country had been constantly visited by pirates, corsairs and filibusters, many of whom were Protestants". In Cuba, the roots of Protestantism occurred around the same time as Christianity. The denominations of Catholicism and Protestantism have a significant influence in Cuban history.

== Demography ==
In 2020, Cubans' religious affiliations were 60.66% Christian, with 53.7% from a Catholic background and 2.68% from a Protestant background. The largest Protestant denominations were Pentecostal and Baptist, but also included Methodists, Presbyterians, Anglicans, Anabaptists and Quakers.

== Catholicism in Cuba during the colonial period 1498–1898 ==
In 1512, Roman Catholicism came to Cuba with the Dominicans being the first Catholic priests and the Franciscans coming years later. The indigenous people were murdered as early as 1516: the bishop at the time Fray Bernardo de Mesa used lunar cycles and geographical situation as the reasoning for slavery of the Indians. Eventually the Indigenous Cubans were killed off with many Cubans being descendants of Spanish and African origin. Originally Catholicism catered to the Spanish because the Native Amerindians were killed as opposed to being converted. Pope Leo X (r. 1513-1521) established the Diocese of Baracoa, which included "all of Cuba" and the Spanish possessions of Louisiana and Florida. The name was changed to the Diocese of Santiago de Cuba in 1522.

Catholicism during this period was important because of the engagement in various aspects of life: baptisms, marriages, and funerals. The church fought the buccaneers and combated immorality. Authority of bishops during the colonial period compared to the highest civilian and military authority on the island; Schools and institutions of higher learning were created and administered by Church authorities.

Some of the bishops who were involved in education at this time were Bishop Jerónimo de Valdés (1705–29) and Bishop Pedro Agustín Morell de Santa Cruz (1753–68); the Royal and Pontifical University of Saint Jerome of Havana was inaugurated during Valdes' tenure in 1724. Throughout the Cuban island, the schools of San Ambrosio and San Francisco de Salles in Havana were established by the church from donations and an increase in church revenue. The Catholic Church was pivotal in establishing education as a central pillar of Cuban nationality:

During the early history of Cuba, the Catholic clergy seemed to have been the principal if not the only agents of education. In 1689, the College of San Ambrosio was founded in Havana for the purpose of preparing young men for the priesthood. As early as 1688, the city council of Havana petitioned the royal government to establish a university in that city, in order that young men desirous of pursuing higher studies might not be compelled to go to Europe to do so. After some years of preparation, the present University of Havana was founded in 1728. The rectors, vice rectors, counselors, and secretaries were all Dominicans.

Aside from education, the Catholic Church made other contributions throughout its early years in Cuba. Many historians consider the Golden Age – years 1750 to 1850 – to be of tremendous importance. This period was significant in one aspect because of the increase of clergy. The Catholic Church's golden age in Cuba began with the tenure of Bishop Diego Evelino Hurtado de Compostela along with the first diocesan synod of 1680. The powerful influence in culture and politics, increase of native clergy, along with the multiplication of church building and seminaries marked the golden age.

The diversity of the church characterized the golden years. Of the 90 churches in Cuba at this time, half of them were headed by Native Cuban priests. The Church was accepted in the urban centers because prior to this time the Spanish had used religion as a tool to influence the local Indians for the acquisition of wealth.

== Protestants in Cuba during the colonial period 1498–1898 ==
The earliest accounts of Protestants in Cuba were in the 1500s. Protestants were not warmly welcomed in Cuba because of the Catholic Spanish colonization of Cuba. By the mid-1800s, the majority of Cubans had become more indifferent toward religion, while Spanish domination of the island was steadily gaining support from the Catholic clergy. However, the richest history of Cuban Catholicism during the colonial period occurred in the 1800s. New immigration laws and other changes brought foreigners from various Protestant nations into Cuba for commerce and diplomacy primarily; the abolition of slavery was the agenda for some Protestants secondarily. Protestants living in Cuba had religious beliefs that contended with religious rules of the land, but Protestants accommodated to the colonial regime differently.

While the 19th century placed Cuba in a more prominent position; the late 1800s particularly gave rise to Protestantism in Cuba. The first year of importance was the year 1866. In New York City, a Cuban expatriate named Juaquín de Palma founded the St. James Episcopal Church, with a primarily Cuban congregation. Cuban Protestants were discriminated against and after the Ten Years' War many Cubans were obliged to move to the United States; it was not until 1878 émigrés returned with certain freedoms promised from the Spanish government due to a peace treaty. Subtle changes were produced in 1869 from the declaration of religious tolerance. Reverend Edward Kenney was the first Protestant minister to be given consent to perform religious duties; arriving from the United States, Kenney arrived in 1871 organizing the first Episcopalian mission, but was only allowed to proselytize foreigners due to limitations by colonial authorities.

The most significant years of Protestantism in Cuba were in the year 1882 and 1883. These years are important because of the establishment of Cuban Protestantism:

As with the Anglicans and Methodists, the Baptists found their initial converts working among Cuban exiles in Florida. In 1882, Juaquín de Palma, who became a Baptist in Florida, returned to Cuba as a Bible distributor with the American Bible Society. He was joined in 1883 by colporteurs Alberto J. Díaz and Pedro Duarte, who were Episcopalian laymen. Later in 1883, Diaz established an independent Protestant church in La Havana, which became Iglesia Bautista Getsemaní in 1886 after Diaz became an ordained Baptist minister in 1885 under the Reverend William F. Wood of Key West, Florida, and became affiliated with the Southern Baptist Convention (SBC).

Religious tolerance until 1886 existed only for foreigners until the Episcopal minister Pedro Duarte went directly to the Spanish Crown citing injustices done to him by local authorities. As a result, the Spanish Constitution of 1876 extended to Cuba in 1886.

The difficulties experienced leads and coincides with the next. Protestantism in Cuba was until 1898 Cuban. The foreign presence after Spain contributed to this change:

In 1898 North American intervention brought full religious lawful equality to Cuba. The arrival of large numbers of returning Cuban exiles and foreign missionaries also contributed to a growing number of Protestant churches. The years following the U.S. intervention were years of sway for the North American Mission Boards in Cuba… Their activities were not limited to organizing churches, but many also invested in founding schools and hospitals. The large U.S. missionary presence in Cuba to a certain point eclipsed the original native missionary efforts, and tensions between foreign and local leaders occurred in virtually every Protestant denomination.

The 20th century would be followed by what would be considered the Americanization of Protestantism.

== Freedom of Religion ==
In 2023 Cuba has been ranked as the 27th most dangerous country to be a Christian, and it was noted that leaders and members of several religious groups have been persecuted, arrested, interrogated and forced into exile.

In the same year, Cuba was given 3 out of 4 for religious freedom.

== See also ==
- Religion in Cuba
- Catholicism in Cuba
- Protestantism in Cuba

== Sources ==
- Religion in Cuba
