= Barbudos =

Bearded revolutionaries

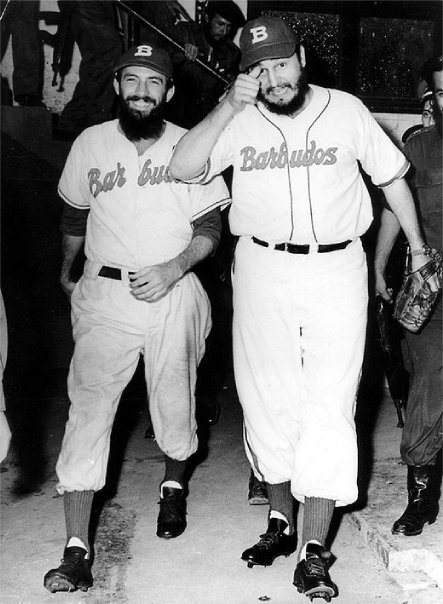
Camilo Cienfuegos and Fidel Castro before playing a baseball game – the word "Barbudos" is printed on their jerseys

Barbudos are bearded revolutionaries. The term was coined to describe the rebel forces of the Cuban Revolution. "Bearded men went in and out of Cienfuegos's office, rifles tossed backwards and forwards. Guevara in La Cabaña, a formidable presence, allowed Cienfuegos the headlines and maintained a discreet silence while ordering a prescription. Cienfuegos symbolized the rebel warrior who, Havana found to its surprise, behaved impeccably. The barbudos, as they became known, did not drink, did not loot, conducted themselves as if they were saints. No army had ever behaved like this in Havana."
