= Carrollcliffe =

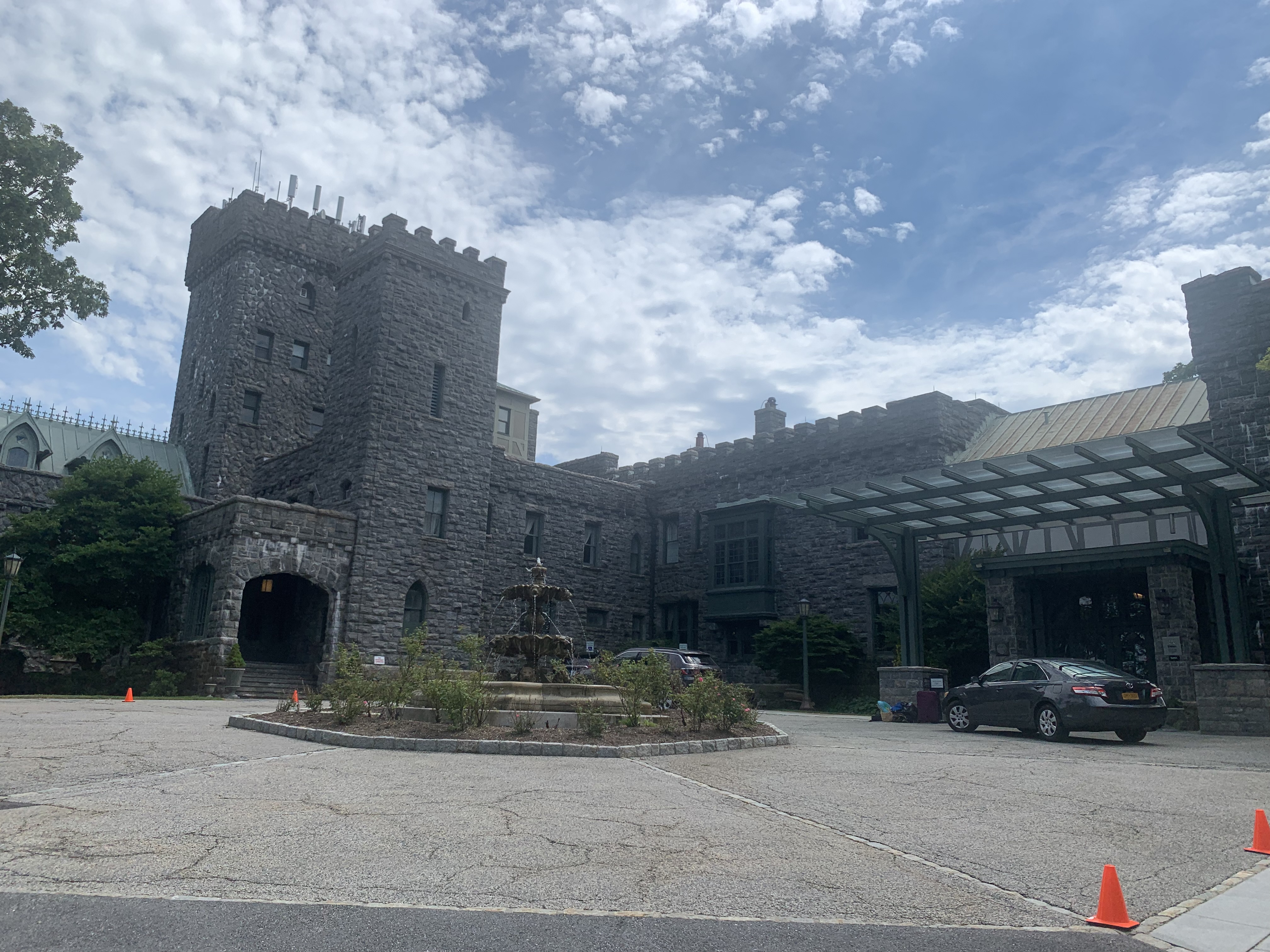

- Location within New York

General information
- Location: 400 Benedict Avenue, Tarrytown, New York
- Coordinates: 41.0671°N 73.8490°W
- Completed: 1897; 129 years ago, 1910; 116 years ago

Carrollcliffe (also formerly known as Castle Hotel & Spa, The Castle at Tarrytown, and Axe Castle) is a historic castle-like building located in Tarrytown, New York. Overlooking the Hudson River valley, it is about 20 miles (32 km) north of the George Washington Bridge. Its hilltop location and the height of its stone towers make it a dominant feature of the area skyline. Built in two stages, in 1897 and 1910, it was constructed to resemble a European castle. In 1981, the village of Tarrytown designated the building a historic landmark. It is part of Westchester County's historical Millionaires' Row. The immediate area where Carrollcliffe is located is locally referred to as the Tarrytown Crest.

== History ==
Named Carrollcliffe, it was built as the residence of General Howard Carroll, with the intention that it should reflect the Norman castle architecture of Ireland, where his father, Howard Carroll Sr., was originally from. It is based on a design by the architect Henry Franklin Kilburn. The finished castle boasted 45 rooms and crenellated towers.

Howard Carroll (1854-1916) was the son of Major General Howard Carroll of the Union army, who was killed at the Civil War Battle of Antietam. After completing his education, split between schools in Albany, New York, and in Europe, Carroll Jr. became the Washington correspondent at, and a special writer for, The New York Times as well as a successful playwright. Having enlisted in the New York State Militia, he earned the rank of brigadier general. A well-connected individual, he was married to a daughter of John H. Starin, a former Congressman and prominent entrepreneur. He was involved in Starin's businesses, becoming an owner of a paving company and an amusement park. J. P. Morgan and Andrew Carnegie were frequent guests at Carrollcliffe. After his death in 1916, the rest of the Carroll family continued to live at Carrollcliffe until 1940.

Beginning in 1941, the building served for decades as the headquarters of the financial firm Axe-Houghton Management (acquired by BNY Mellon). In 1992, Swiss private banker Hanspeter Walder and his wife bought the property along with a group of investors. Their stated vision was to convert the castle into a luxury inn while rediscovering and ultimately preserving its original beauty and charm. Walder was later convicted of embezzlement and misapplication of bank funds and sentenced to 97 months in federal prison for defrauding clients out of $70 million to pay for renovations and operations.

In 2003, Elite Hotels, a limited liability company formed by C. Dean Metropoulos, purchased the property, then called The Castle at Tarrytown, for $10.9 million (according to a newspaper article at the time, which described it as "a 31-room inn on 10.1 acres"). It operated as a hotel and spa until November 2024 and has since been vacant.

== In popular culture ==
The building has served as a filming location for several productions. Early films include the 1917 silent film Richard the Brazen and the 1922 film The Headless Horseman, which utilized its grounds and exterior. More recently, the Beyoncé music video "Irreplaceable" (2006) and scenes for the HBO series Boardwalk Empire (2010–2014) were filmed there, specifically in its Oak Room.
