= Adventist University of the Antilles =

Private Christian university in Mayagüez, Puerto Rico

Coordinates: 18°12′21″N 67°06′46″W

Antillean Adventist University
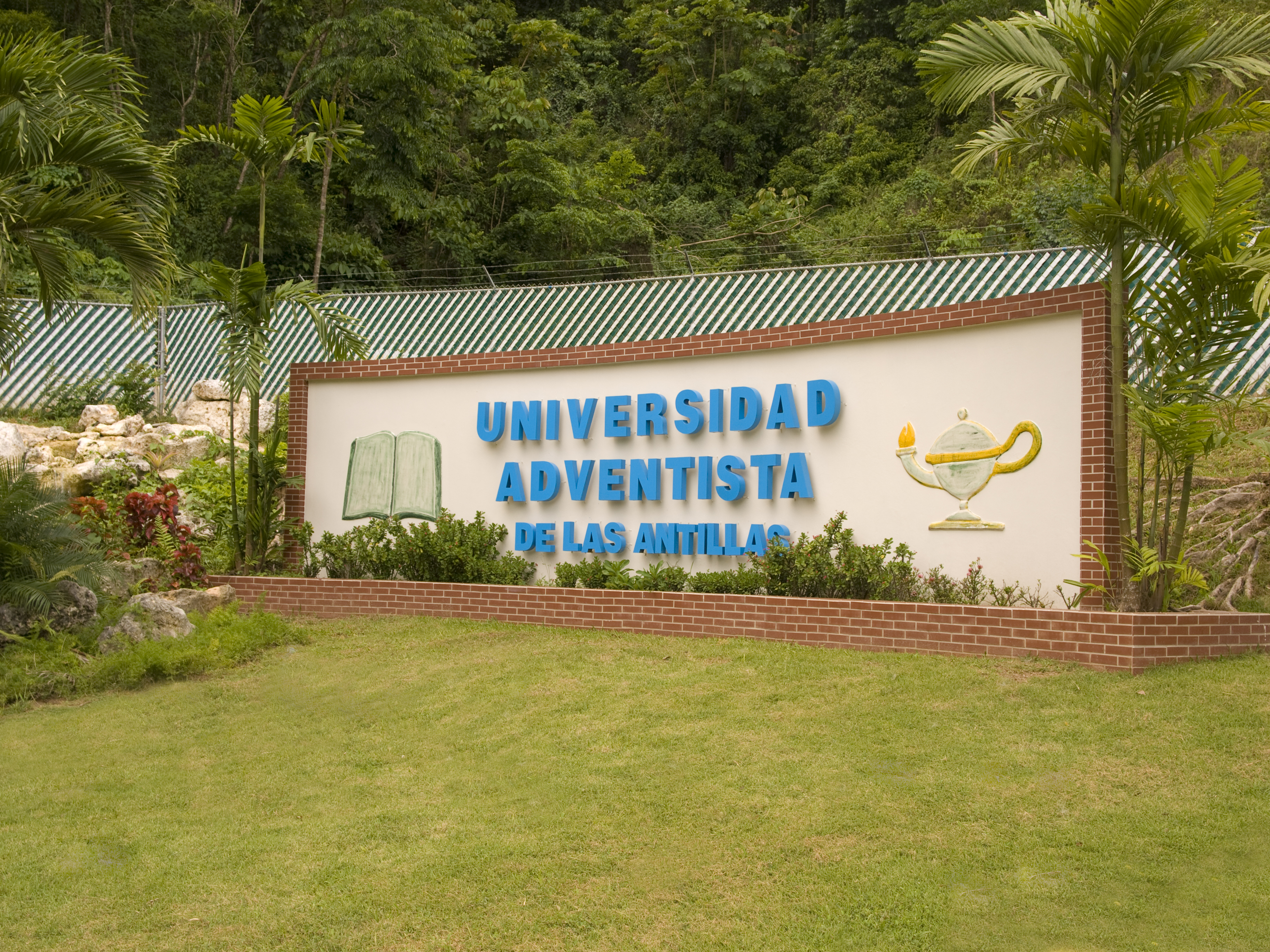
- Former name: Antillean College
- Motto: Spirituality, Excellence and Service
- Type: Private university
- Established: 1946; 80 years ago
- Religious affiliation: Seventh-day Adventist
- President: Myrna Colón
- Students: 1,400
- Location: Mayagüez, Puerto Rico
- Website: www.uaa.edu

The Antillean Adventist University (AAU) (Spanish: Universidad Adventista de las Antillas, UAA) is a private, Seventh-day Adventist university in Mayagüez, Puerto Rico. It is a part of the Seventh-day Adventist education system, the world's second largest Christian school system. The university developed from the merging of two educational institutions: Puerto Rico Academy established in 1946; renamed in 1957 as the Colegio Adventista Puertorriqueño, and Antillian College which moved to Puerto Rico as a result of the Cuban Revolution. In 1989, the school's higher education program was licensed by the Council of Higher Education of Puerto Rico on August 18, 1989.

The university is sponsored by and affiliated with the Seventh-day Adventist Church, and is situated within 284 acres (1.15 km^{2}) of mountainous land with a view of the Atlantic Ocean. AAU offers undergraduate studies in arts and sciences, and graduate studies in arts.

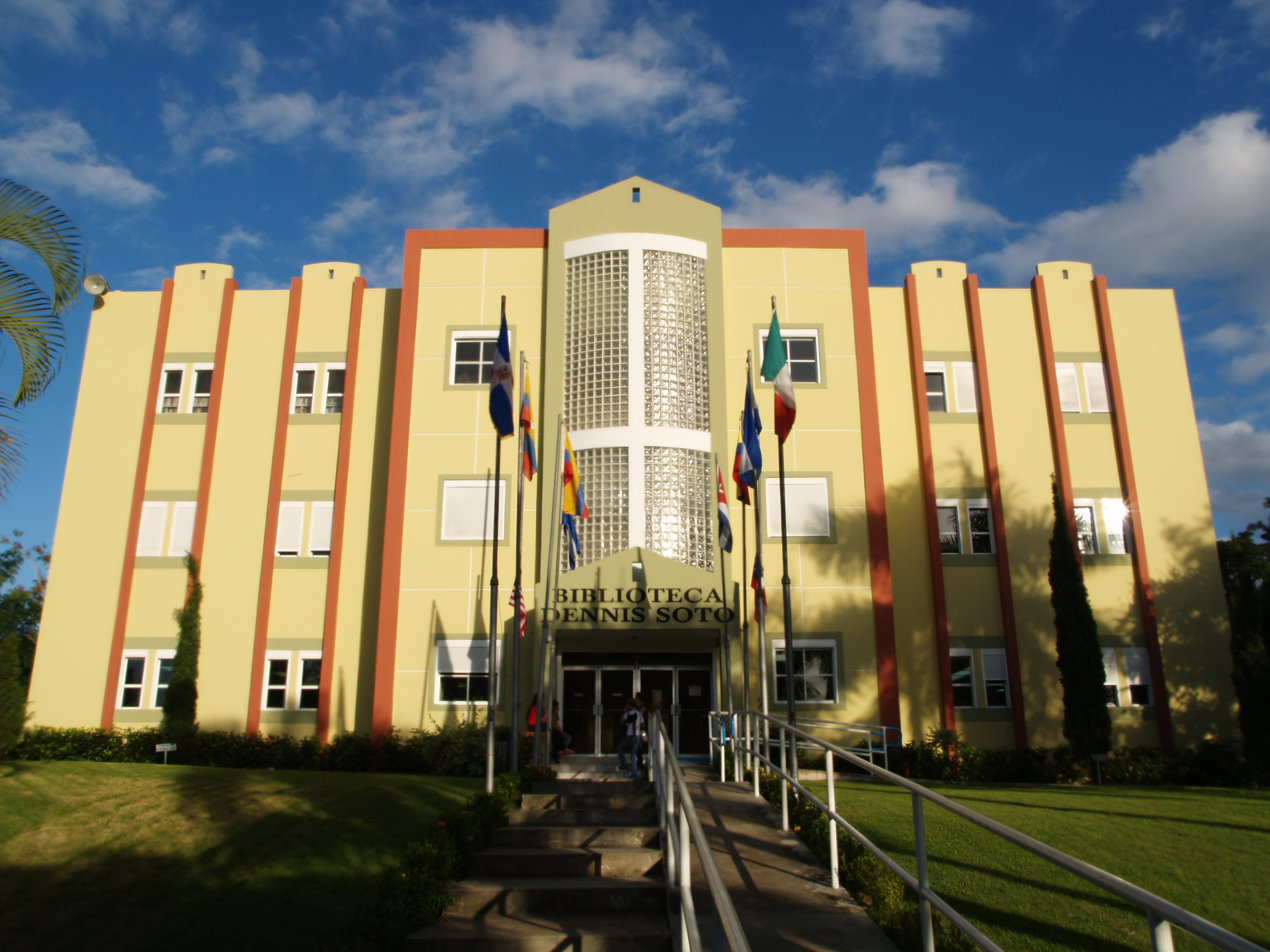
UAA Library

== History ==
Antillean Adventist University has its roots in Cuba of the early 1900s. After a disrupted educational attempt in 1911, the school became established in 1923. In 1939, the Inter-American Division of Seventh-day Adventists decided to move the campus to Santa Clara from Bartle, Oriente Province and to upgrade the institution to that of a junior college. It was the only educational institution in the Antillian Union which offered courses in Spanish above the primary grades. At the time, the Antillian Union of Seventh-day Adventists included the Bahamas, Cuba, Puerto Rico, Haiti, and Jamaica.

=== The Battle of Santa Clara ===
The Cuban Revolution's decisive Battle of Santa Clara in December 1958, took place within a few miles of Antillian College. Walter J. Brown, then president of the college, provided an eyewitness account for the Adventist flagship journal, the Review and Herald. The battle took place in the last days of December, 1958. Bombing had destroyed transportation routes causing two hundred of the college's students to remain on campus during the Christmas season. Across the road from the college was Central University.

On Saturday, December 27, the college cancelled all their many activities off campus. Special prayers were offered for protection and the return of peace to the nation. Around midnight, Saturday night, two barbudos from Ernesto (Che) Guevara column were posted to guard the college's building. Others had taken over the university across the highway from them. The college folk went to see these famous "men from the hills." The two bearded and armed barbudos were very tired, yet confident of their cause. They soon discovered that the college folk were not hostile to them. Charles R. Taylor, of the Bible department, obtained a sleeping bag. The two soldiers took turns sleeping in it. The college folk went to the university entrance. There they found a large number of rebels. The rebels were tired and hungry but friendly. They were offered cold milk from the college dairy, for which they expressed their gratitude.

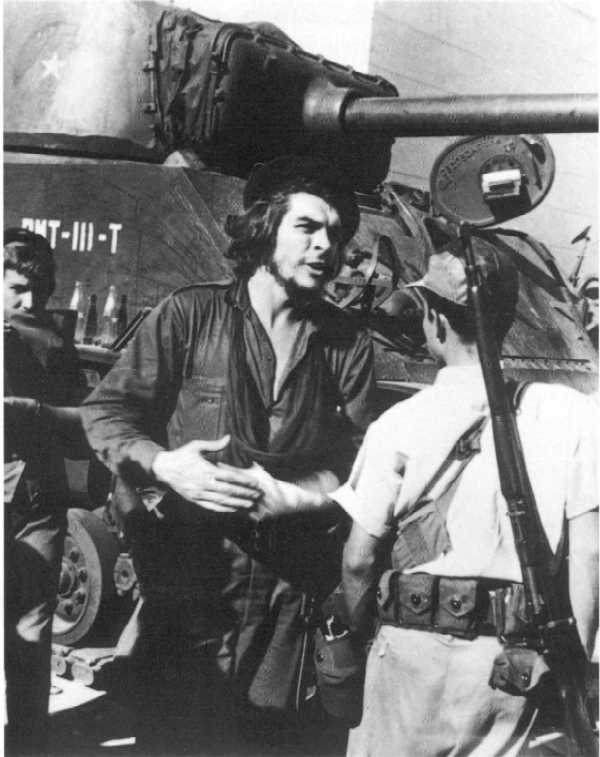
Che Guevara, after the battle of Santa Clara, January 1, 1959

Brown further recounted, "We walked to the university campus and there found the commander, Dr. Ernesto (Che) Guevara (who had previously been befriended by Adventist), with an assistant looking over the map of the city. He soon came over and spoke with us, requesting the school to provide food for doctors, nurses, and others who might be coming through during the next few days. When we indicated that we had a problem in obtaining milk and food, he indicated that we were now in the Free Territory of Cuba, and that the rebel soldiers would see to it that we received all that was necessary.... At noon of that first day, about one hundred men came in for dinner. Mrs. Pena, our acting matron, had them sit at the tables. Then she explained the procedure in our cafeteria, adding that it is our custom always to ask God to bless the food before we begin to eat. She asked Mr. Santos, our food-factory manager, to pray. As he started, the rebels, who had been sitting down, stood up, turned in Mr. Santos' direction, and stood in complete silence during the prayer."

On Wednesday, December 31, the Battle came to the college. They watched a bomber swoop past the university and heard a plane head for the college. It dropped its bomb on College land. For just over an hour planes made machine-gun attacks on the campus. The girls, several teachers, and the rebels who had been eating in the dining room, found protection in the laundry located in the girls' dorm basement. The boys fled to the shower rooms in the basement of their dorm. Married families and teachers hid in the lower floor of the new industrial building. Still other students and faculty members, together with some rebels, crowded into the hallways under the reinforced concrete floor of the new library.

The farm manager was on horseback bringing in the cows for milking. A plane went after him. His assistant and a student were out in the field plowing. Because of their tractor's noise they did not realize that they were being machine-gunned until after the plane had roared by. Professor Taylor was having his own private devotions in a bamboo grove when he saw a plane head for him. He jumped into a nearby ditch. When the plane persisted in its aim, he swam up the creek, with only his head above water, and remained so until the shooting was over. Everyone prayed. There were no injuries among the people, or the animals. That night the government fell and Castro had won. The rebel doctors and troops were still with them on Thursday, January 1, 1959. One hundred and eighty ate supper with them that night.

A few days later, in a celebration across the road at the university, the college's choir took part. (Che) Guevara came and the new premier, Fidel Castro, also was in the audience.

=== Move to Puerto Rico ===
On New Year's Day, 1959, it seemed that the college would be able to continue on with its program in Cuba as the new Cuban leadership allowed it to operate with no restrictions. However, three years later after all other religious institutions had been closed or severely restricted, the new Cuban government closed the school, December 15, 1961. For the 1961–1962 school year, Antillian College had two campuses; one in Cuba, the other in Puerto Rico. By March, 1962, the Cuban government allowed a seminary to continue operating on the Cuban campus. The Puerto Rican campus experienced some rapid growth as the flow of students for the new school year shifted to that school.

=== History since 1961 ===
Antillean Adventist University celebrated 60 years of its founding in a rebranding ceremony on Wednesday, November 17, 2021, where it presented its new official name: Antillean University.

== See also ==
- List of Seventh-day Adventist colleges and universities
- List of Seventh-day Adventist hospitals
- List of Seventh-day Adventist medical schools
- List of Seventh-day Adventist secondary schools
