= St. James' Episcopal Church and Parish House =

Episcopal church in the Bronx, New York

St. James' Episcopal Church
- St. James' Episcopal Church and Parish House
- St. James' Church
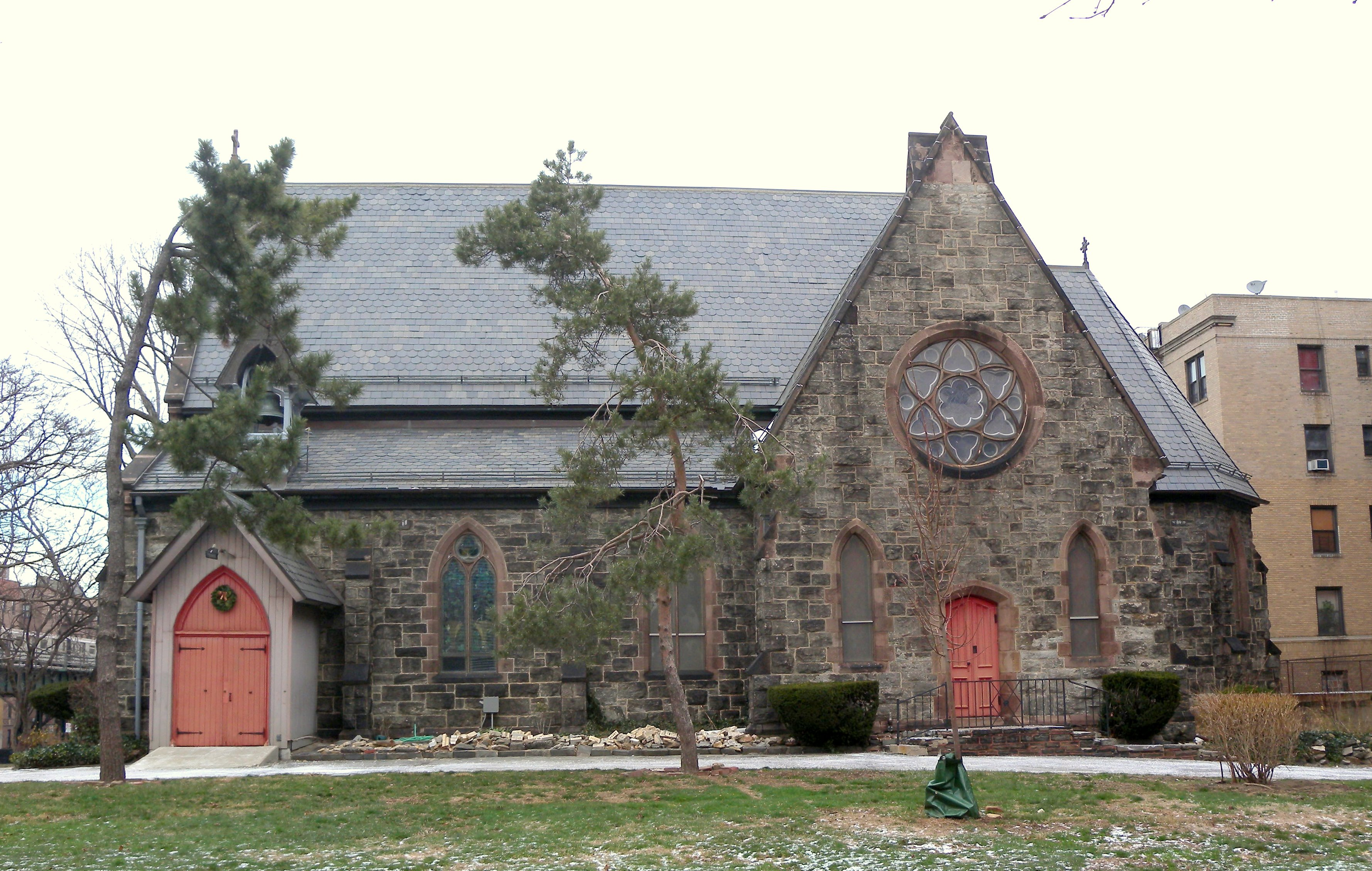
- South side
- St. James' Episcopal Church
- 40°51′50″N 73°54′0″W
- Location: 2500 Jerome Ave., Fordham, The Bronx, New York City
- Country: United States
- Language: English
- Denomination: Episcopal
- Website: stjamesfordham.org

History
- Status: Parish church
- Founded: 5 July 1853
- Founder: Joshua Weaver
- Dedication: James the Great
- Consecrated: November 1, 1865

Architecture
- Functional status: Active
- Architectural type: Gothic Revival
- Groundbreaking: May 28, 1864
- Construction cost: $25,000

Specifications
- Materials: Stone

Administration
- Province: International Atlantic Province (Province 2)
- Diocese: New York

Clergy
- Bishop: Matthew Heyd
- St. James' Episcopal Church and Parish House
- U.S. National Register of Historic Places
- New York City Landmark
- Location within New York City Location within New York Location within the United States
- Area: 1 acre (0.40 ha)
- Built: 1863 (for church); 1891-1892 (for parish house)
- Architect: Henry C. Dudley (for 1863 church); Henry Franklin Kilburn (for 1891-1892 parish house)
- Architectural style: Gothic Revival
- NRHP reference No.: 82003347
- NYCL No.: 1081
Significant dates
- Added to NRHP: September 30, 1982
- Designated NYCL: November 25, 1980

St. James' Episcopal Church and Parish House is a historic Episcopal church at 2500 Jerome Avenue and 190th Street, in the Fordham neighborhood of The Bronx in New York City. It was founded July 5, 1853, becoming the first Episcopal parish in Fordham. The parish at first met at the Manor Reformed Church on Kingsbridge Road, then on June 11, 1854 acquired an old schoolhouse for use. On October 1, 1854, the Rev. Joshua Weaver became its first rector.

== Buildings ==
The church was designed in 1863 by architect Henry C. Dudley (1813-1894). Bishop Horatio Potter laid the cornerstone of the present building on May 28, 1864, and the church was consecrated by the same on All Saints' Day, November 1, 1865.

It is a "native stone" building with brownstone trim in the Gothic Revival style. It was completed at a cost of $25,000.

The stone parish house, located on Jerome Avenue, was built 1891-1892 to the designs by Henry Franklin Kilburn. It was listed on the National Register of Historic Places in 1982. It was designated a New York City Landmark in 1980.

The parish also operated an apartment building on its property, built to relieve the housing shortage after World War I and as a business venture to raise revenue for expanding the church and parish house. It opened in 1924; however, the debt proved onerous with the coming of the Great Depression. The property was finally sold in 1924.

== See also ==
- List of New York City Designated Landmarks in the Bronx
- National Register of Historic Places listings in the Bronx
