= University of Montemorelos =

Seventh-day Adventist university in Mexico

Coordinates: 25.1932°N 99.8444°W

Universidad de Montemorelos
- Former names: Escuela Agrícola Industrial Mexicana (1942-1950); Colegio Vocacional y Profesional Montemorelos (1950-1973)
- Motto: Vision para emprender. Pasion para servir. (Vision to undertake. Passion to serve.)
- Type: Private university
- Established: August 1941
- Religious affiliation: Seventh-day Adventist Church
- Rector: Dr. Ismael Castillo Osuna
- Location: Montemorelos, Nuevo León, Mexico
- Colors
- Website: www.um.edu.mx

The University of Montemorelos (Spanish: Universidad de Montemorelos) is a private coeducational Seventh-day Adventist university located in Montemorelos, Nuevo León, Mexico. The university grants degrees in medicine, nursing, nutrition, management, arts and various other disciplines.

Montemorelos is one of only six Adventist universities worldwide that grant degrees in medicine, the others being Loma Linda University, Adventist University of the Philippines , Universidad Adventista del Plata, Babcock University and Universidad Peruana Unión.

It is a part of the Seventh-day Adventist education system, the world's second largest Christian school system.

University of Montemorelos Logo University of Montemorelos (UM) is located in Montemorelos, Nuevo León, Mexico. It is locally known as Universidad de Montemorelos A.C.. The university was established in 1942. It is accredited by Secretaría de Educación de Nuevo León.

== See also ==
- List of Seventh-day Adventist colleges and universities
- Seventh-day Adventist education
