= Maranatha Volunteers International =

Seventh-day Adventist missionary organisation

- Type: Non-Profit
- Industry: Construction
- Founded: 1969
- Founder: John Freemen
- Headquarters: Sacramento, California, United States
- Area served: Worldwide
- Revenue: 13,068,659 United States dollar (2016)
- Total assets: 21,117,804 United States dollar (2022)
- Website: www.maranatha.org

Maranatha Volunteers International (Maranatha) is a non-profit Christian organization founded in 1969 and is based in Roseville, California United States with offices in Canada, Latin America, India and Mozambique.

It is a supporting ministry of the Seventh-day Adventist Church with the primary focus of organizing volunteers to build churches and schools in developing nations.

== History ==
In 1969 under the direction of John Freeman a commercial photographer, a group of Seventh-day Adventist volunteers flew to the Bahamas to build a church This idea expanded to other projects involving volunteers flying their private planes to locations to build churches and was organized into Maranatha Flights International based in Berrien Springs, Michigan.

In 1989 Maranatha Flights International merged with Volunteers International under the new name of Maranatha Volunteers International and later moved the headquarters to Sacramento, California. Since 2009, the headquarters are based in the neighboring city of Roseville, California. By 2019, Maranatha Volunteers International had enlisted more than 85,000 volunteers who had participated in 2,170 missionary teams in 88 countries, constructing 11,229 new structures and drilling more than 1,000 water wells.

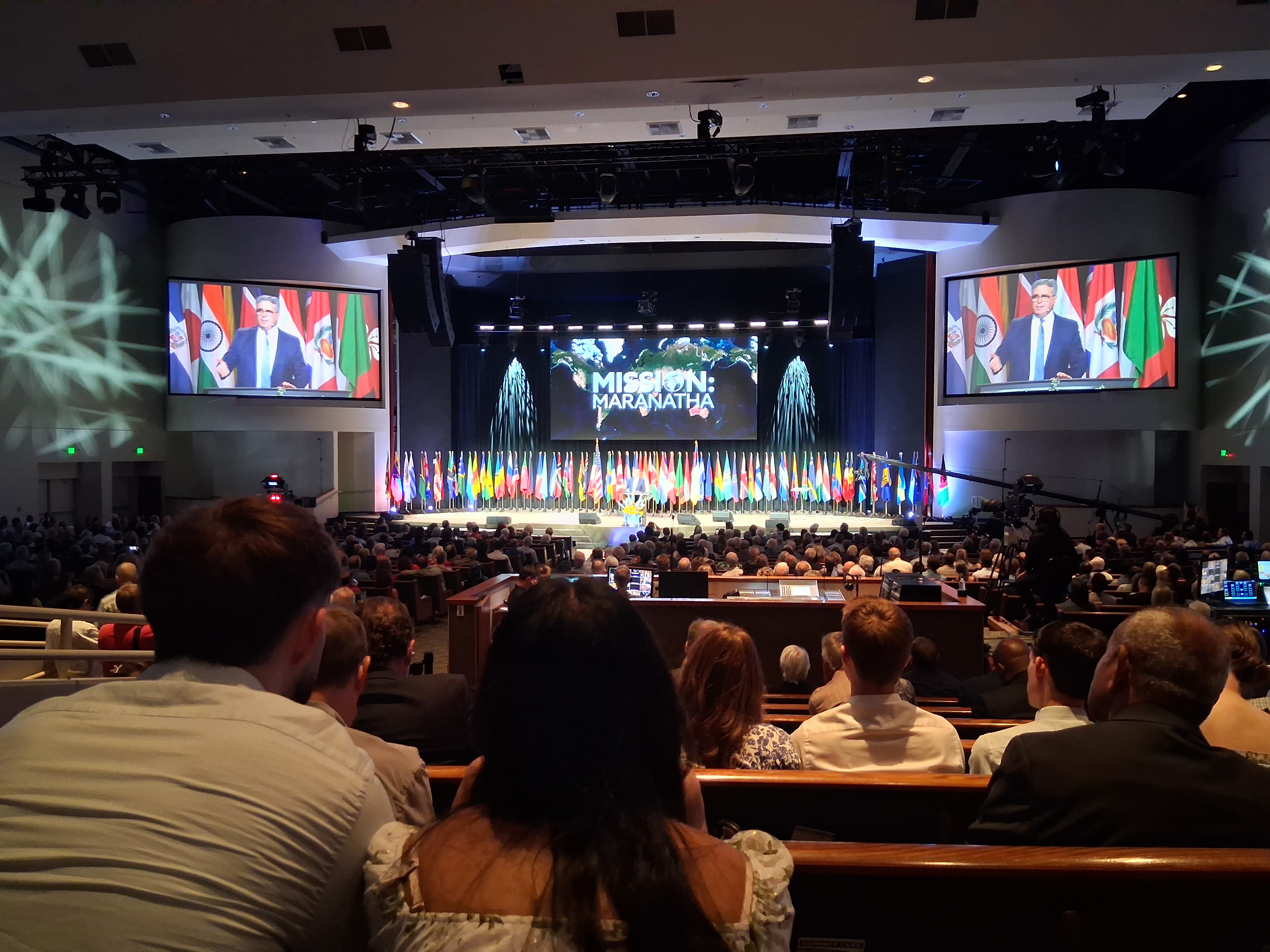
Pastor Erton C. Köhler, president of the Adventist World Church, speaking at the Mission 2025: Maranatha Convention in Sacramento, CA.

== Volunteers ==
An average of 3,000 volunteers participate in projects each year. The majority of the volunteers are from the United States and Canada but participants come from all over the world. They generally pay for their transportation as well as a participation fee which covers meals, lodging, in-country transportation and insurance while on the project. Most projects are approximately two weeks duration.

The funding for the buildings is primarily furnished by Maranatha via donors as well as participation by Adventist-laymen's Services & Industries (ASI). The local church provides the land and final labor and materials.

Projects are classified into categories such as teen, young adult, open, group or family depending on the volunteer makeup. While the teen Ultimate Workout and young adult groups which are age limited, other projects have widely varying age volunteers. A number of volunteers participate in multiple trips, often on an annual basis.

Not all volunteers are skilled in the construction trades. In addition to actual building construction, some volunteers are typically involved in cooking and some may participate in community projects such as Vacation Bible School or medical and dental clinics.

== Active projects ==
Maranatha concentrates their building activities in certain countries which change from time to time. In 2010 Maranatha is building primarily in Cuba, Ecuador, Haiti, India, Malawi, Mexico, Mozambique, Zambia and the United States. In 2009, 507 churches were built of which 428 of the structures were "One-Day Churches" built in 25 countries.

=== Haiti ===
In 2010 Maranatha provided assistance to Haiti following the January 2010 earthquake. 140 "One-Day Churches" are currently being built in Haiti to be used as churches, schools, medical triage and temporary shelters.

=== One-Day Church ===
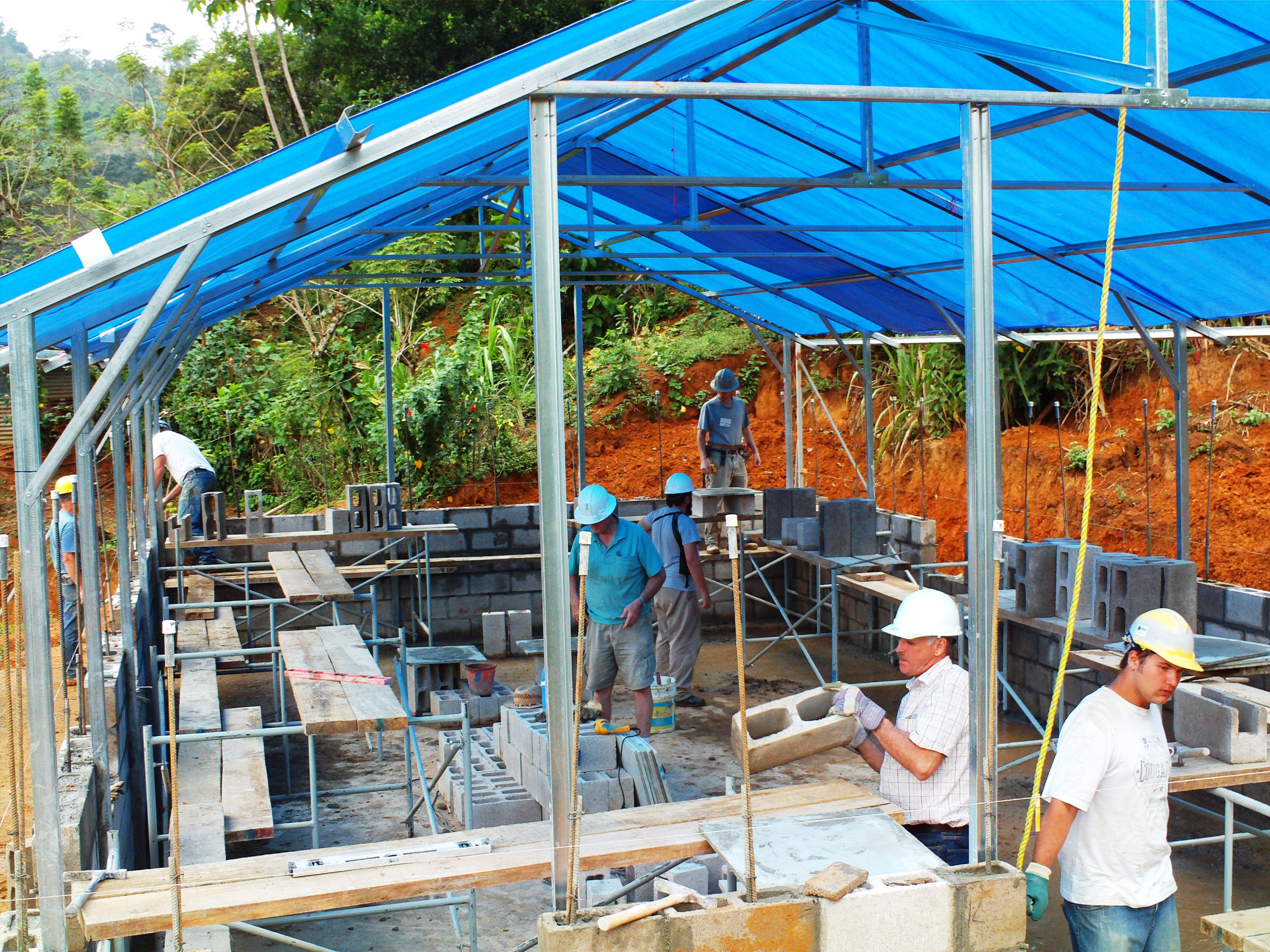
Volunteers building a One-Day Church in Bebedero, Chiapas, Mexico January 2010

The One-Day Church was developed jointly by Adventist-laymen's Services & Industries and Maranatha in an effort to meet the demand for rapid economical construction of more buildings. The galvanized steel frame and roof of the church are manufactured at a facility in Dodge Center, Minnesota, containerized and shipped on-site where it is assembled by volunteers and local personnel in one day.

The walls and floors are built of local materials and vary according to local practices. Floors are most often poured concrete. As of March 2009 over 1,000 structures had been manufactured and as of July 2010 more than 800 had been constructed in 10 countries.

=== One-Day School ===
In June 2010 Maranatha introduced the One-Day School project at the General Conference of Seventh-day Adventists session in Atlanta, Georgia. This project is an extension of the One-Day Church idea providing a metal frame, roof, walls, doors and windows. The project launch involves 1,000 classrooms with the first One-Day School to be built in Zimbabwe.

=== Ultimate Workout ===
The Ultimate Workout is a volunteer two-week mission program for high school age teenagers. These projects are generally in Latin America and may involve up to 200 volunteers. In July 2010 the Ultimate Workout project celebrated its 20-year anniversary with a reunion project in Chiapas, Mexico.

=== Catalyst ===
Maranatha's catalyst project is dedicated towards creating a spiritual community for like-minded people which can help them in their spiritual life. It specially targets the age group 18-28.

== Publications ==
Maranatha has a quarterly magazine named The Volunteer that is mailed to volunteers and donors.

== Maranatha Mission Stories ==
Since 2003 Maranatha has produced a 30-minute television program named Maranatha Mission Stories which documents various building projects. Now a weekly program, it has surpassed 100 episodes. It is shown on 3ABN and Hope Channel.
