= Saint Paul's Episcopal Cathedral (Syracuse, New York) =

Historic church in New York, United States

- St. Paul's Cathedral and Parish House
- U.S. National Register of Historic Places
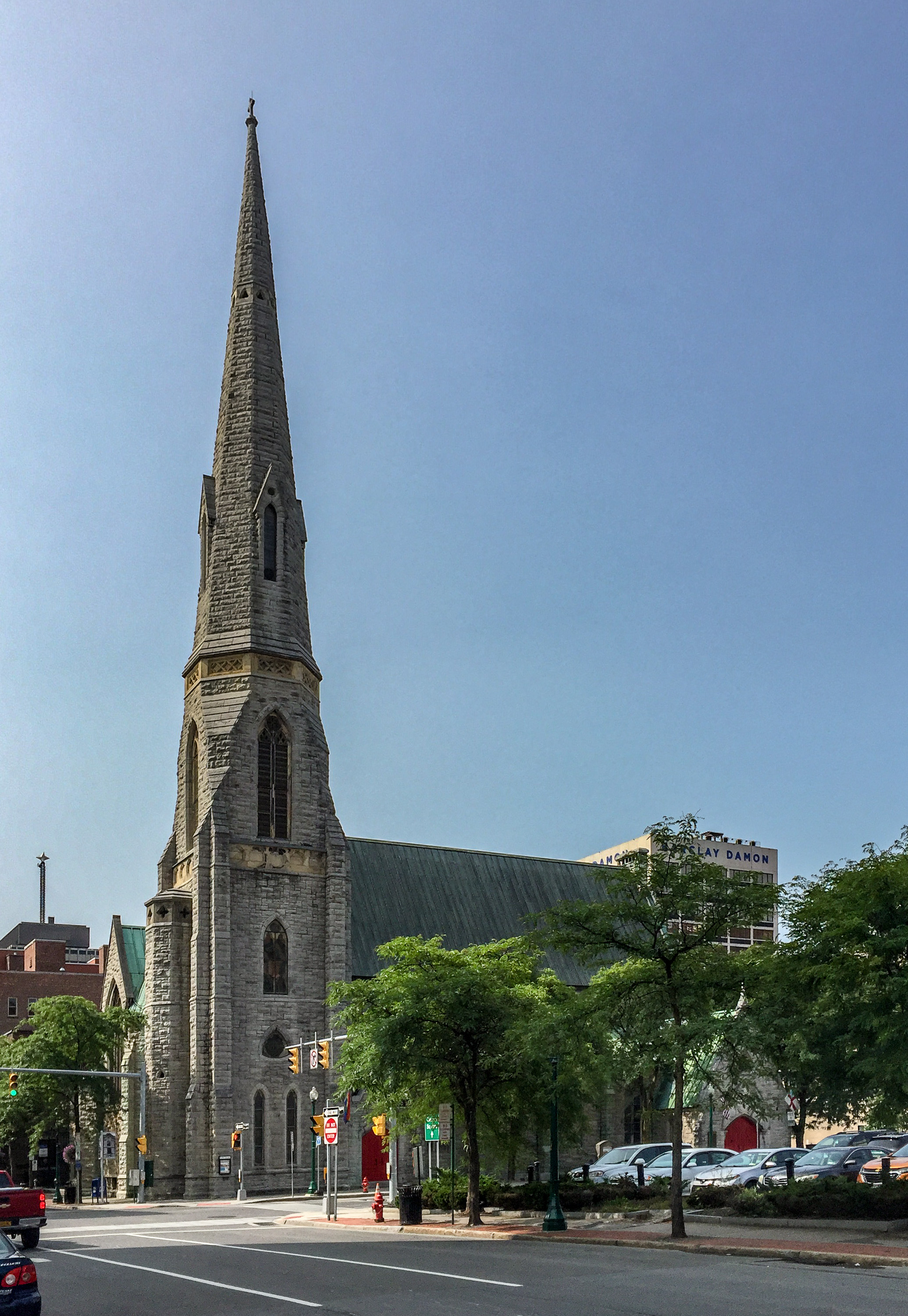

- Location within New York Location within the United States
- Location: 310 Montgomery Street, Syracuse, New York
- Coordinates: 43°2′54.31″N 76°8′58.95″W
- Built: 1884–1885
- Architects: Henry Dudley; Alfred Taylor
- Architectural style: Gothic
- NRHP reference No.: 78001891
- Added to NRHP: December 1, 1978

St. Paul's Cathedral in Syracuse, New York is the seat of the Diocese of Central New York in the United States Episcopal Church. It was designed by Henry Dudley, who worked with Frank Wills until Wills' early death in 1857. The church is located at 310 Montgomery Street in downtown Syracuse.

The cathedral reported 189 members in 2025. Plate and pledge income for the congregation in 2024 was $152,482 with average Sunday attendance (ASA) of 70.

== The White family ==
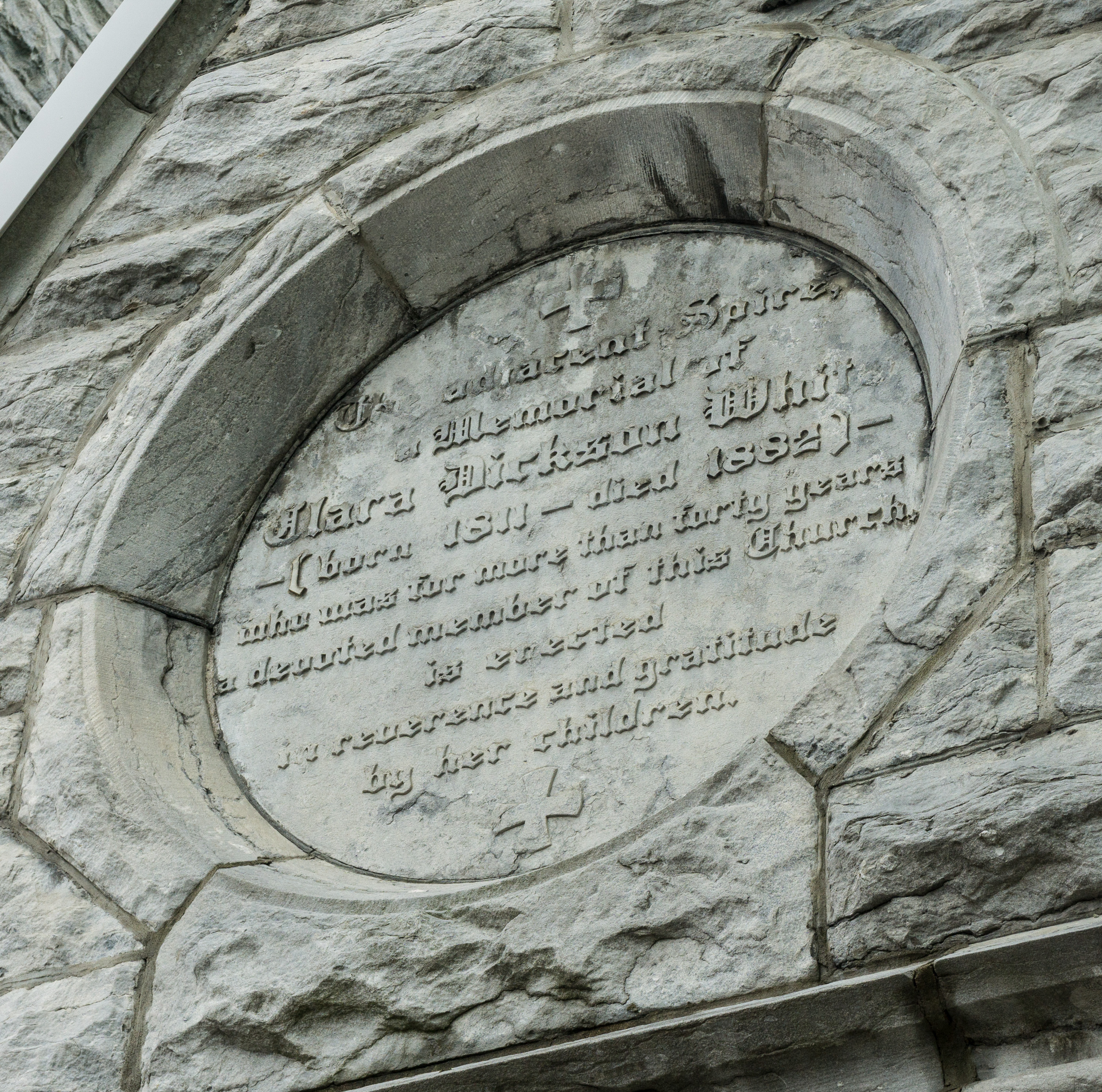
The cathedral spire is dedicated to Clara Dickson White, mother of Andrew Dickson White

The locally prominent White family was closely associated with St. Paul's since its founding. It was observed that "the name [White] should always be woven into the history of St. Paul’s."

- Horace White (1802–1860; banker and businessman) was a vestryman for over twenty years and warden. He is honored with a stained glass window on the south aisle
- Clara Dickson White (1811–1882; wife of Horace) donated money for construction of the tower. The spire was dedicated in her honor.
- Hamilton White (1807–1865; banker and brother of Horace) was a vestryman for many years and served on the building committee, and is honored by the White Memorial Chancel Window.

The spire and windows were dedicated in 1907 by Horace and Clara's sons Andrew Dickson White (1832–1918; co-founder and first president of Cornell University) and Horace Keep White (1835–1915; banker and head of a salt company).

== See also ==
- List of the Episcopal cathedrals of the United States
- List of cathedrals in the United States
