= Hamilton White House =

Historic house in New York, United States

- U.S. National Register of Historic Places
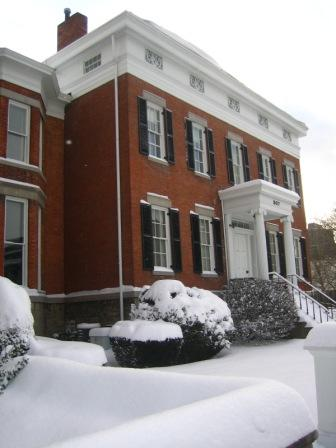

- Location within New York Location within the United States
- Interactive map showing the location of Hamilton White House
- Location: 307 S. Townsend St., Syracuse, New York
- Coordinates: 43°2′53.59″N 76°8′43″W
- Built: 1845
- Architectural style: Greek Revival
- NRHP reference No.: 73001238
- Added to NRHP: July 20, 1973

The Hamilton White House is a historic home in Syracuse, New York. The house, Greek Revival in design, was built by and for Hamilton White, circa 1840/42, and occupied by his family in 1842/43. Many believe based on similarities in structure and style that the unknown architect and builder was the same person who designed and built the Moses Burnett House, completed in early 1842, later to become the Syracuse Century Club building. The house was added to the National Register of Historic Places in 1973 due to its significance in the area of architecture and its relationship, through Hamilton White, to the commerce and politics of Syracuse. It is currently a commercial property with several offices.

== Hamilton White ==
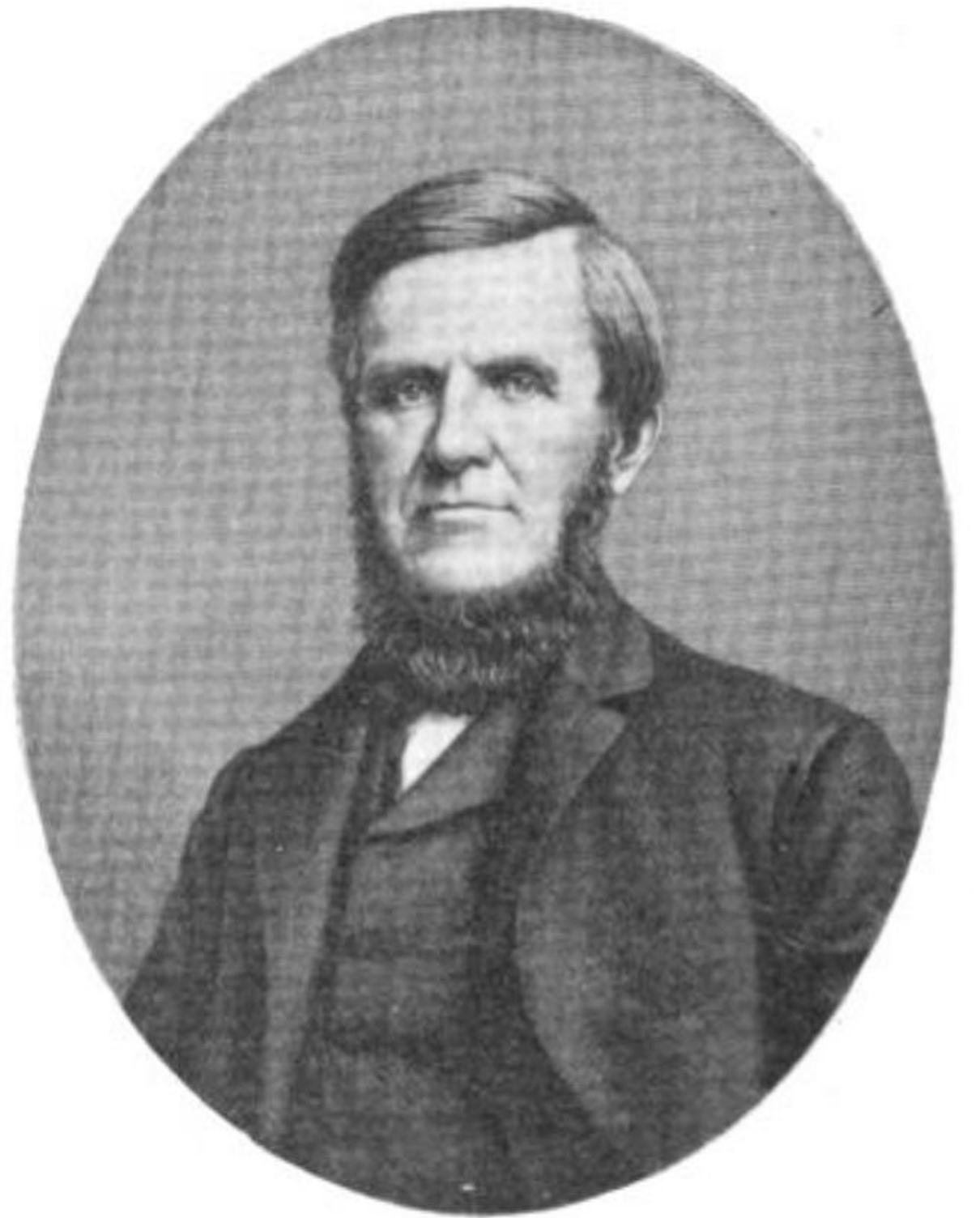
Hamilton White (1807-1865)

Hamilton White (1807—1865) lived at the White House until his death; his family retained ownership until 1911/12, although the building briefly housed the Kanatenah Club. The house is the last of a number of National Register of Historic Places-listed residential structures, in original construction and exterior, remaining in the immediate vicinity of downtown, along the city's Fayette (later, Fireman's) Park. In 1976 it was purchased by an investment group and converted into business offices. In 2002, it was sold to a private environmental firm, but remains offices for lawyers and other small businesses.

=== Family background ===
The White family was prominent in central New York. Hamilton White was the third son of John (also referred to as 'Asa') White, a farmer and gristmill owner in Homer. Hamilton White became a lawyer, farmer, investor and businessman, and moved to Syracuse after a legal apprenticeship in Buffalo, with his wife Sarah Randolf Rich. Together, they raised five children. White and his brother Horace both worked at Onondaga County Bank as Cashiers, later co-founded the Syracuse Bank, served on several bank boards, created multiple salt companies including Syracuse Coarse Salt Company (Syracuse was a principal supplier of salt in America), and became trustee for and investor in both the Erie Canal and the New York Central Railroad, as well as numerous commercial businesses, some that he founded.

He was active in numerous community leadership roles, especially religious and social-welfare issues. He was a leading philanthropist, he, his family and descendants supporting many community, religious and civic organizations: including founding or co-founding Syracuse University's Crouse College, Cornell University; St. Paul's Episcopal Cathedral and its two predecessor churches, the first AEM Zion church in Syracuse, donated funds to complete Grace Episcopal Church in Cortland NY and funded one of the nine back chapels in St John the Devine Cathedral in New York City; also funded the Orphan's Home, now Elmcrest Children's Home, and the Syracuse Home Association, originally a multi-faith consortium to provide community and social services, especially for the poor, now a provider of long-term healthcare and elder-care services.

The family supported the abolishment of slavery, quietly funding black churches and the underground railroad and recruited national speakers including Frederick Douglas to visit Syracuse during the 1850s. They supported efforts of Gerrit Smith and Dr. Samuel May, the founder of May Memorial Unitarian Universalist Church.

The local United Way leadership campaign, the Hamilton White Society, is named for the family's philanthropy and community development support. Created in 1988, The Hamilton White Society is the United Way's national model for leadership in small and medium-sized communities.

== Hamilton Salisbury White ==
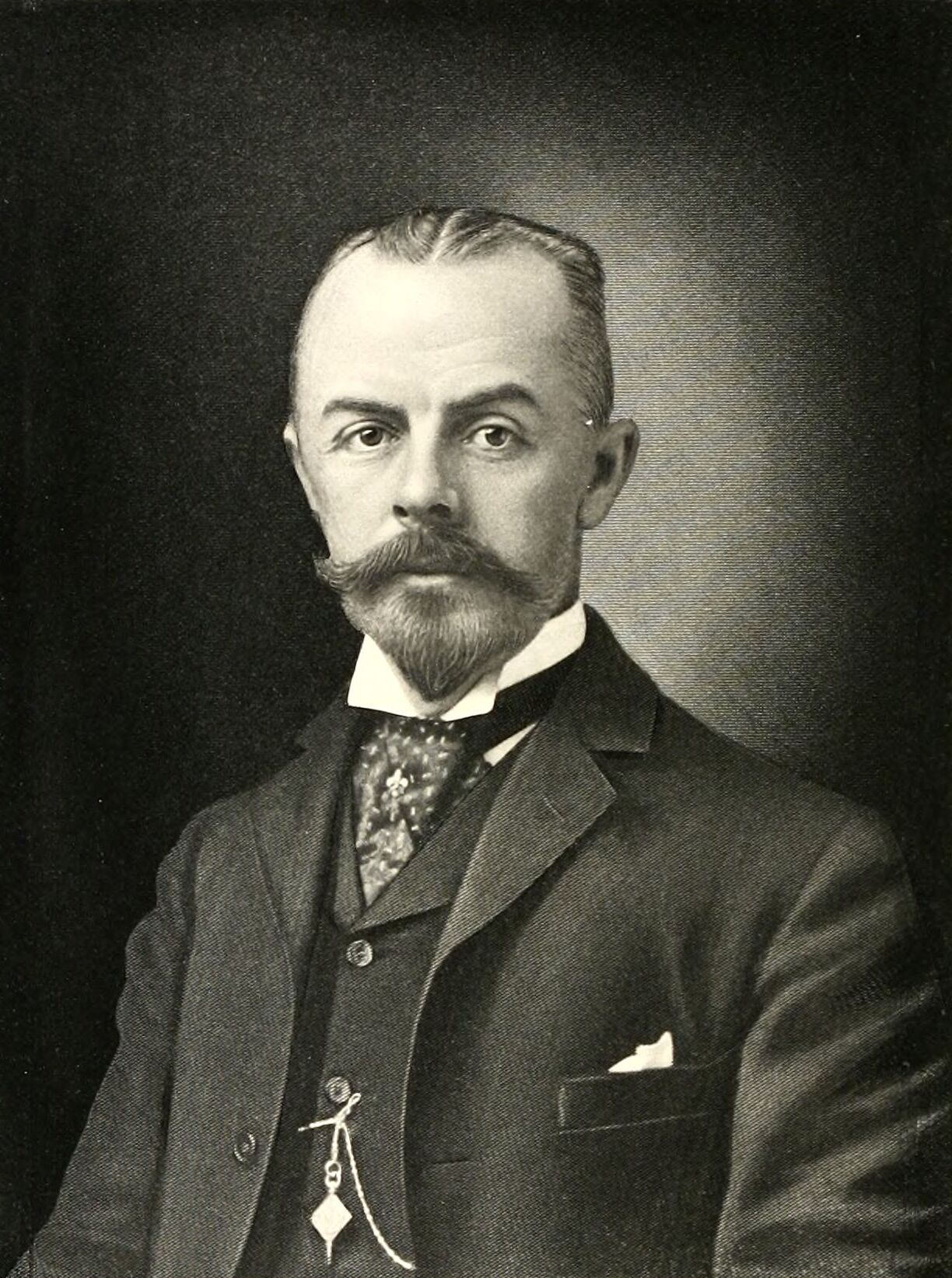
Hamilton Salisbury White (1853–1899)

The most prominent of his five children, Hamilton Salisbury White (1853–1899), was born in the house. He was a lawyer, real estate owner, investor, and businessman, who dedicated his life to be a professional firefighter, and later became a city fire commissioner. He funded his own fire company becoming the first paid and professional firehouse in the world. Among White's many contributions to safety and equipment design, White is also acknowledged for first initiating the concept of "response time" into firefighting and life-saving techniques.

=== Early life ===
Hamilton White's interest in firefighting started at an early age. As early as age four, he boarded his pony cart in the stables behind the house and rushed out to watch the volunteer firefighters of the city; watching their efforts shaped his future life. Later, as a student at Cornell University, he stabled a horse outside his dorm room, so he could visit fires and watch the volunteer firemen in Ithaca, NY.

=== Firefighting ===
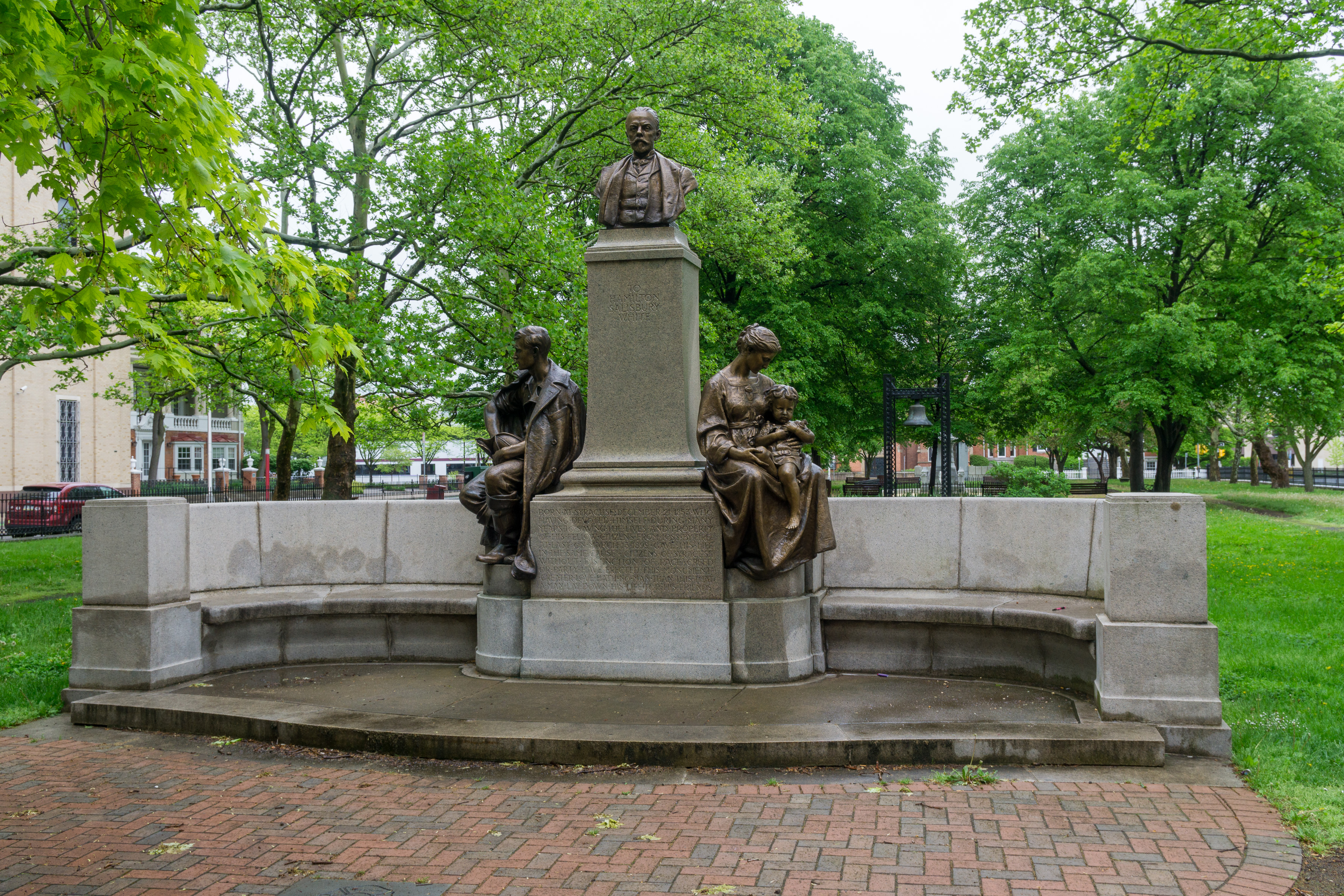
Hamilton Salisbury White memorial in Fayette Park, directly across from the Hamilton White House

After graduation from Cornell, Hamilton S. White returned to Syracuse, developed the city's first public, mechanical and electric fire alarm systems, copied after Ithaca's mechanical system, and built his firehouse at the former 400 Genesee Street, close to the family house. Here, he boarded and trained his fire company, provided all the firefighters' equipment and support, paid the men's salaries, and educated the company in science and techniques of building construction/structural design, fire science and basic chemistry, since many fires were chemically based. He continually focused on the firefighters' education and improvement in what he regarded as a "science of firefighting." His company worked seven days on, seven off.

He is credited with re-designing the firefighter's "turnout suit," creating the first second-floor dormitory with the "fireman's pole" for fast access to the engine from the dormitory sleeping quarters, integrating the world's first electric/mechanical alarm system into the firehouse, as well as numerous other safety inventions.

He integrated the alarm system into the door-gate using counterweights to lower the horse collars, also counter-weighting the sheets and blankets into the dormitory fly-space (the reason early firehouses had high ceilings), lined horse stalls with plush carpeting, and provided a library as well as a custom carved pool table for the men's recreation.

White is credited with the first practical use of the concept of "response time". Others have also taken credit with the original idea, but White challenged his company (who were mostly second sons of farmers) to arrive at a reported fire site before he could ride from his home or a community event to the fire's location, usually under five minutes. The normal arrival period for volunteers was 20 or more minutes. White, himself, would arrive at a fire, dressed in his turnout and equipment, before his company, coming from his home or a community function. He had realized the importance of early arrival in saving lives and property. That he recognized this imperative and used his firehouse as a training center for fire fighting technique and sciences resulted in his being characterized as the first "gentleman fireman" and the "world's first professional firefighter".

=== Death ===
Ironically, White died in 1899 fighting a downtown chemical fire at the Syracuse Optical Company - most probably from a heart attack induced by toxic fumes from burning chemicals stored in the rear of the structure. He died at the nearby Dawson's Pharmacy in downtown Syracuse.

A memorial to Hamilton Salisbury White was unveiled in Fayette Park on June 27, 1905. The park, and the memorial, stand directly opposite White's boyhood home.

== Later history ==
The White family remained in the house until 1911; the property was sold out of family ownership in 1912 and later belonged to a neighboring church and various businesses. Detailed information on both the house and White family is available in the Onondaga Historic Association.

The park across from the house (Fireman's Park, but known by its original name of Fayette Park) was used to fence in farm animals for the several park-side residences. It was later converted to a city park and today is the site of a number of statues and monuments to fallen firefighters, including the Hamilton White Monument, designed by Gail Sherman Corbett and built in 1904. Sherman, a native Syracusean, was one of the first independent female architects and designers in the US.

=== The White family ===
Other prominent family members included: Horace White (banking, salt, investor railroads), Horace K White (banking, salt industry), Horace K. White, II (lawyer, NYS Senator, Lt. Governor, Governor, interim Managing Director), Howard Ganson White (Syracuse Standard newspaper founder/publisher), Adelaide, wife of Hamilton S. (opera singer, inventor), Jane Antoinette White Swift Sherman (patron of arts, music and opera singer, founder of (Syracuse) Morning Musicals), Hamilton Howard White (founder of Hamilton White Insurance Company, real estate), Kathrine Cook White (pioneer radio broadcaster), Andrew Dickson White (diplomat, ambassador, Cornell University's co-founder and first president), Andrew White Swift (painter), Hamilton White Swift (editor Syracuse Journal), Andrew White Swift II (news critic), Andrew Strong.White attorney, sportsman/equestrian, his brother,Ernest I White, also an attorney and Syracuse University Law School sponsor/funding, Hamilton White Wright (travel writer, playwright, US/European amateur golf champion), Hamilton S White, Esq (Syracuse law firm Hancock & Estabrook) and Hamilton S White, Jr. (banking, law, corporate governance, enterprise risk management).

Governor White and his son Andrew both served as Managing Directors and interim publishers of the Syracuse Post-Standard, Herald, and Sunday edition newspapers prior to their sale to Newhouse Publications.

The family owned a number of historic landmark buildings: The Hamilton White House, the Horace and Hamilton White Memorial Building (1876), the Empire Hotel Building; the original property at the current Chimes Building (former Florence Apartments); four historic mansions along Syracuse's prestigious James Street; the White House (farmhouse, later Onondaga Golf and Country Club and the Lyndon Golf Course properties where the farmhouse is located) plus two more mansions in the nearby village of Fayetteville, New York; and various commercial holdings/properties throughout downtown Syracuse.

At his death in 1899, Hamilton Salisbury White also left his widow, Adelaide, 46 residential properties designed or rebuilt by renowned architect Ward Wellington Ward, plus other homes built by other well known local architects. White bought these properties from fire victims, rebuilt them at his personal cost, and allowed the victim families rent-free use, until those former owners could in turn repurchase them at cost, or chose to move to other quarters. Additionally, Mrs. White built and owned several residences herself, including two on Brattle Road (where she lived as a widow), several in the University neighborhood, others across Syracuse she rented.

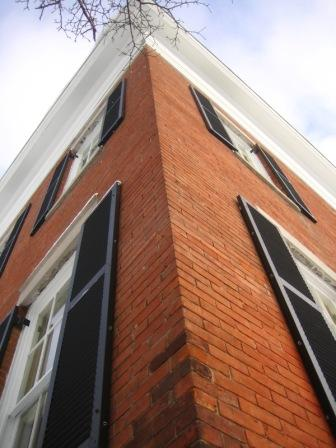
Corner detail

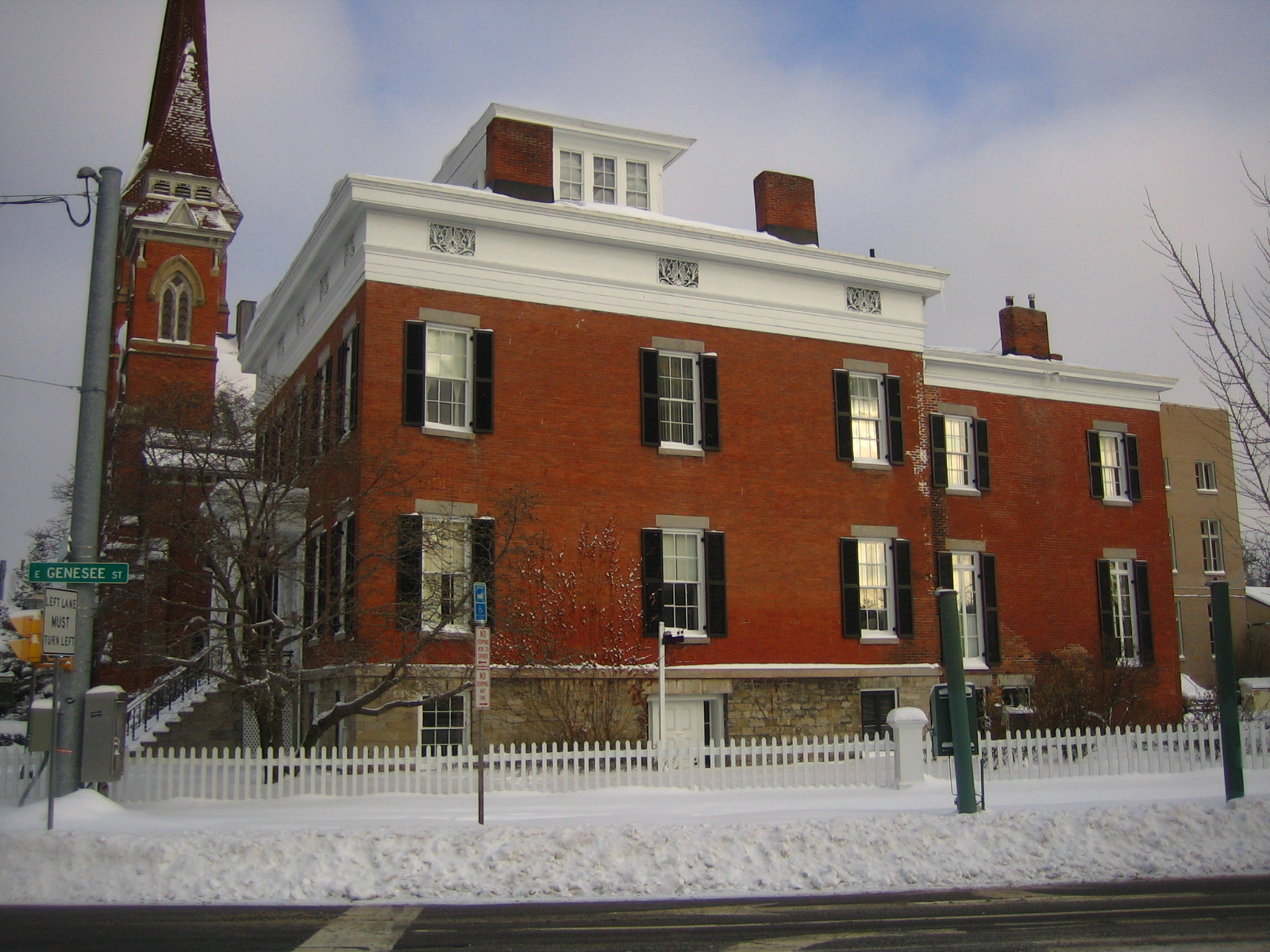
Side view

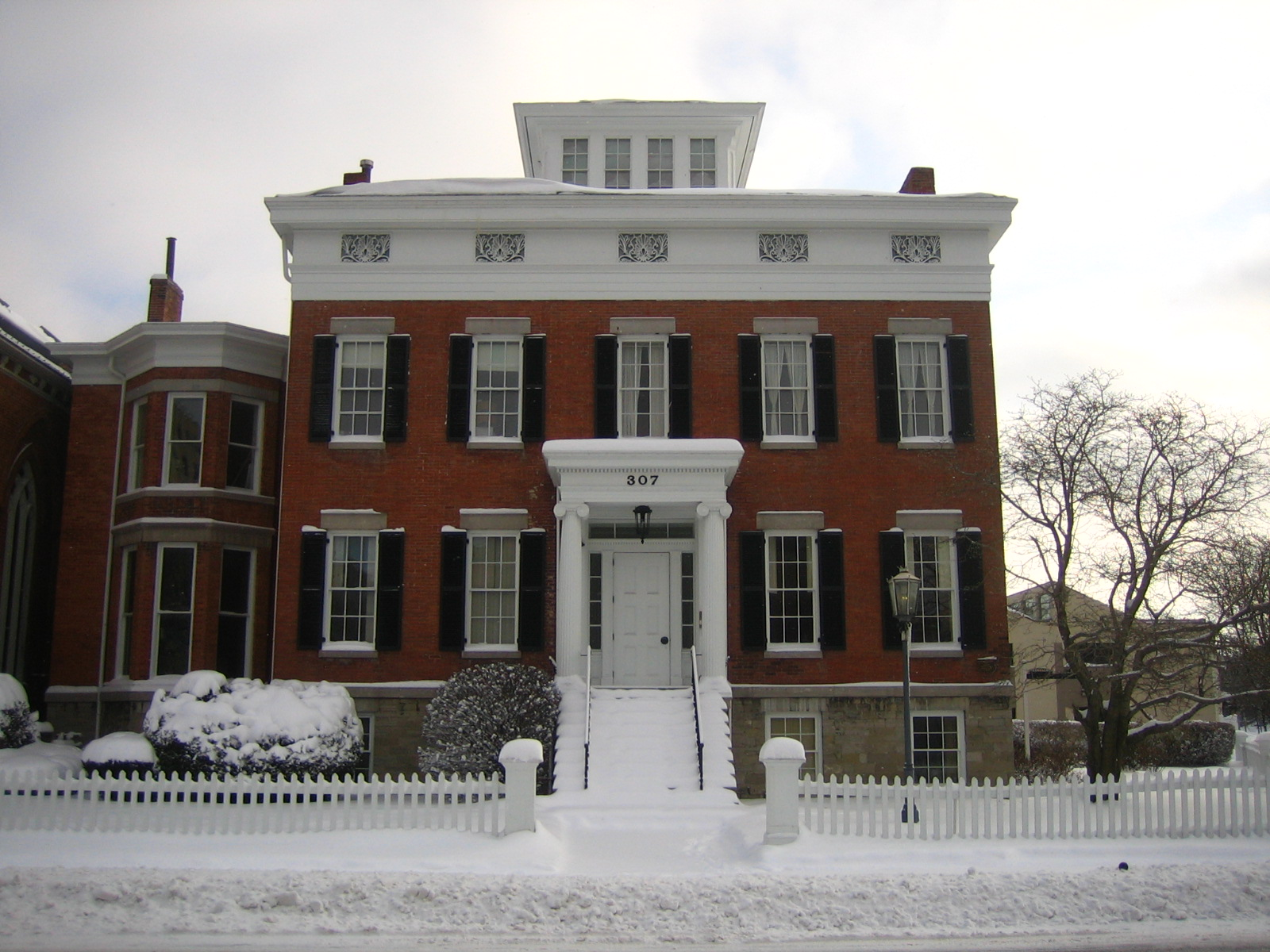
Another view
