= Trinity Church Lansingburgh =

Historic church in New York, United States

- U.S. National Register of Historic Places
- U.S. Historic district
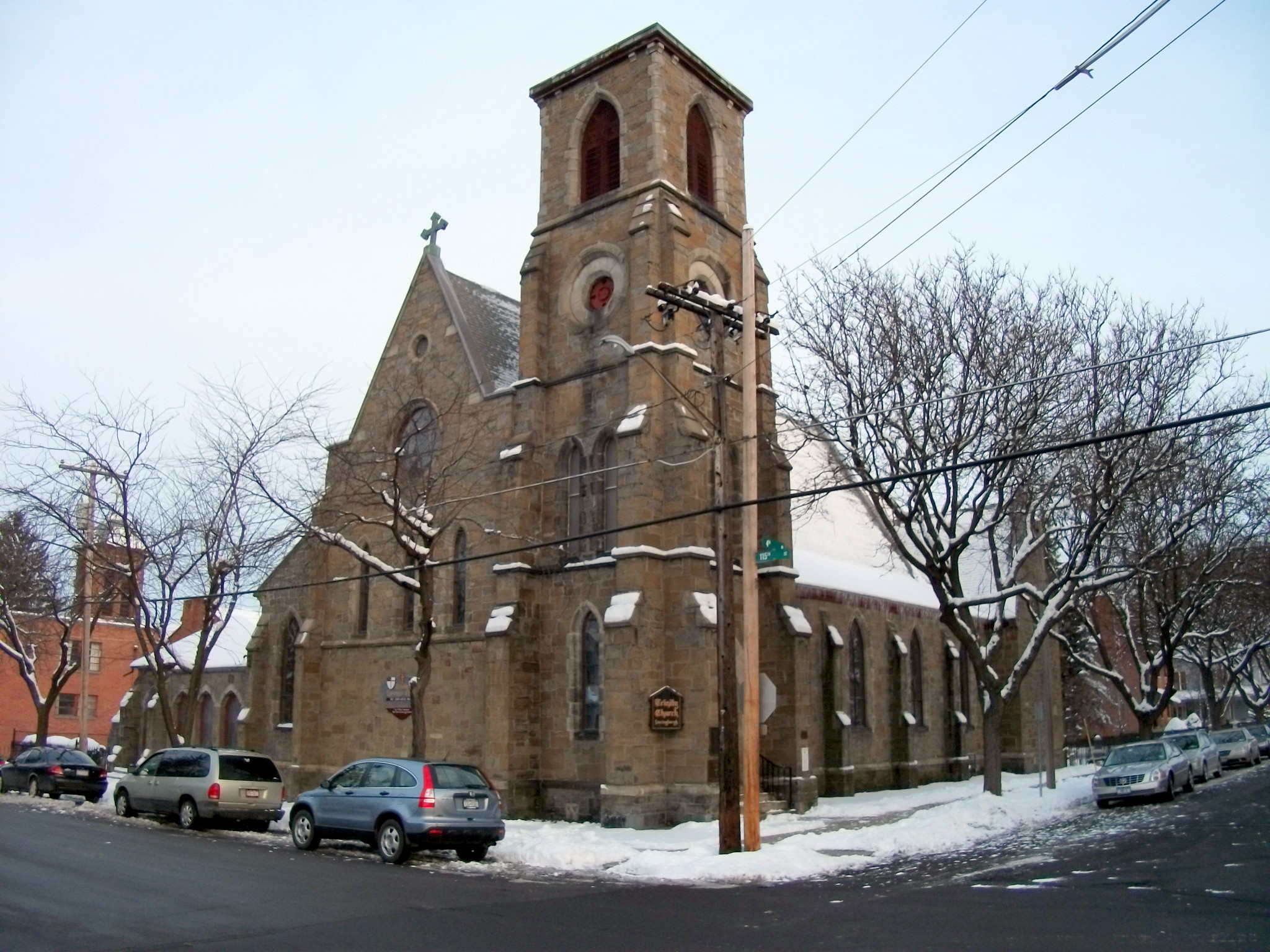
- Trinity Church Lansingburgh, January 2011

- Location within New York Location within the United States
- Location: 585 Fourth Ave., Troy, New York
- Coordinates: 42°46′28″N 73°40′32″W
- Area: less than one acre
- Built: 1807, c. 1844, 1869, 1930
- Architect: Dudley, Henry
- Architectural style: Gothic Revival, Greek Revival
- NRHP reference No.: 95000478
- Added to NRHP: May 1, 1995

Trinity Church Lansingburgh is a historic Episcopal church complex located at 585 Fourth Avenue in Troy, New York. The complex consists of the Gothic Revival style stone church (1869) designed by architect Henry C. Dudley, a Greek Revival style brick rectory (c. 1844), brick parish hall (1930), cemetery (1807) with approximately 240 graves, and a wrought iron fence (1901).

It was listed on the National Register of Historic Places in 1995.
