= St. Peter's Episcopal Church Complex (Auburn, New York) =

Historic church in New York, United States

- U.S. National Register of Historic Places
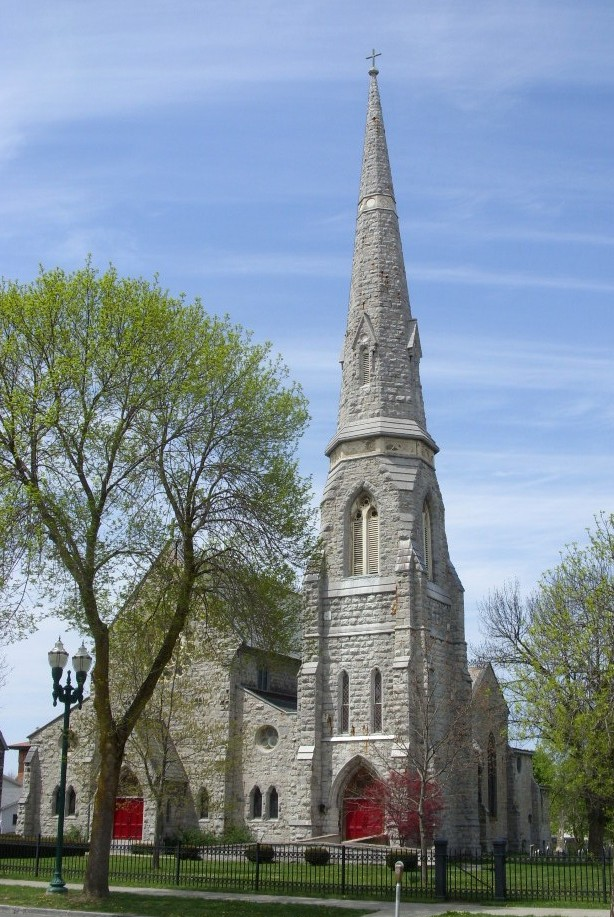
- Saints Peter and John Episcopal Church (2009)

- Location within New York Location within the United States
- Location: 169 Genesee St. Auburn, New York
- Coordinates: 42°55′47″N 76°34′18″W
- Area: 1.8 acres (0.73 ha)
- Built: 1870 (church) c.1930 (parish house)
- Architect: Henry Dudley (church); William J. Beardsley (parish house)
- Architectural style: Gothic Revival (church); Late Gothic Rev. (parish house)
- MPS: Historic Churches of the Episcopal Diocese of Central New York MPS
- NRHP reference No.: 01001508
- Added to NRHP: January 24, 2002

The St. Peter's Episcopal Church Complex is a historic Episcopal church complex located at 169 Genesee Street in Auburn. The complex consists of the church, the Parish House, a cemetery, and a small burial plot.

The church as built in 1868–1870 was designed by architect Henry Dudley in the Gothic Revival style. It is constructed of rock faced limestone laid in random ashlar and trimmed with dressed limestone. It is composed of a rectangular shaped nave, flanked by side aisles and intersected by a compact transept, with an offset bell tower and spire highlighting an asymmetrically arranged facade. A large rose window is centered within the gable field of the nave.

The Parish House is a 2 1/2-story, H-shaped structure competed c.1930 and designed by William J. Beardsley in the late Gothic Revival style. The earliest burials date to about 1812, when the first Church of St. Peter occupied this site. The burial plot includes the remains of Enos T. Throop (1784–1874), Governor of New York from 1829 to 1833.

The parish is now known as the Saints Peter and John Episcopal Church.

It was listed on the National Register of Historic Places in 2002.

== See also ==
- National Register of Historic Places listings in Cayuga County, New York
