= Trinity Church (Elmira, New York) =

Historic church in New York, United States

- U.S. National Register of Historic Places
- Empire Sports of the Southern Tier
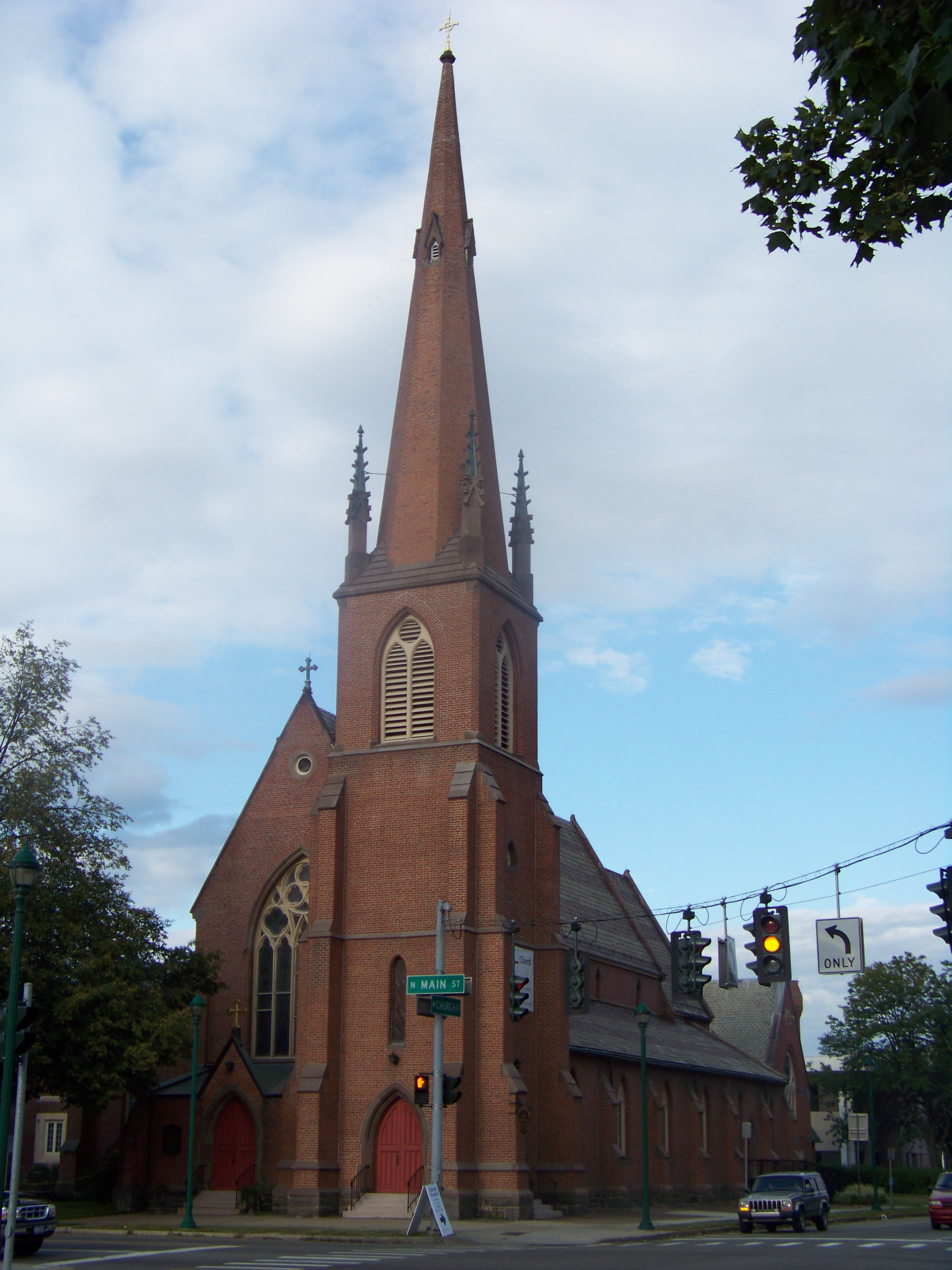

- Location within New York Location within the United States
- Location: Elmira, New York
- Coordinates: 42°5′24″N 76°48′30″W
- Built: 1855
- Architect: Dudley, Henry; et al.
- Architectural style: Gothic Revival
- NRHP reference No.: 07001122
- Added to NRHP: October 31, 2007

The parish of Trinity Church, Elmira, New York, United States was founded in 1833. Trinity Church is a parish of the Chemung District of the Episcopal Diocese of Central New York, centered in Syracuse, New York. The present structure of Trinity Church is located at 304 North Main Street, Elmira, New York. Designed by architect Henry Dudley, the church was built from 1855 through 1858. It is significant for its Gothic Revival architecture. The church was listed on the National Register of Historic Places in 2007. In 2024, the church was converted into a sports complex.

== History ==
The first recorded Episcopal service in Elmira was conducted by the Right Reverend Benjamin Treadwell Onderdonk, D.D., Bishop of the Episcopal Diocese of New York on May 16, 1832. Services were again held in Elmira in 1833 conducted by James D. Carder early in the year and by Daniel E. Brown in May. James D. Carder's report given to the 1833 New York Diocesan Convention in New York City stated, "[i]n Elmira, Tioga county, he performed divine service several times previous to the middle of July; and on the 12th of June organized a parish by the name of Trinity Church. He has for some tome looked to that place with much interest, and now contemplates with thanksgiving to God the sure foundation which he believes is there laid for the Church. On the last Lord's day, he had the satisfaction of administering the holy Communion for the first time in that parish. Thirteen communicated, and one was repelled." There were also reported to be three children baptized and one marriage in the parish that year. Trinity Church was incorporated as a parish on June 12, 1833, under the supervision of James D. Carder. The Rev. Thomas Clark is listed as the first rector.

Trinity's worship services began simply in a school house where Park Church stands today. As stated by Rev. Clark that Fall in his report to the 1833 Diocesan Convention, "I arrived in Elmira as Missionary to that place on the 20th of July last, and found a small but zealous company of Episcopalians, who received me with the most lively pleasure as their Missionary. Some of them had lived without the services of their Church for several years, not having heard an Episcopal minister at Elmira more than three or four times previously to my arrival. I have commence preaching in the District School Room, which I generally have nearly fill; and it is probable, if we had a church, there would many more attend." As parish membership grew, a need for larger quarters was evident. With comparatively little money, but the commitment of time, energy and building materials from the Church family, a new church edifice was completed in December 1836 at Church Street and Railroad Avenue. The church was consecrated on the morning of Sunday, August 27, 1837, by Rt. Rev. Benjamin Treadwell Onderdonk, D.D.

The present building at Church and Main Streets was designed by Henry Dudley of New York and built by Nichols and Washburn. The cornerstone for the present structure "...was laid with impressive ceremonies," by Right Rev. William Heathcote DeLancey on July 26, 1855. The first service was held in this structure on July 4, 1858, after it was completed. The church building was consecrated by The Right Reverend Arthur Cleveland Coxe, D.D., Bishop of the Episcopal Diocese of Western New York in services held on April 5, 1866, after the construction debt was discharged.

The Arnot Memorial Chapel was designed by architect Richard M. Upjohn, its cornerstone was laid in 1880. The chapel was consecrated on November 28, 1882, by Right Reverend Frederic Dan Huntington, Bishop of the Episcopal Diocese of Central New York. The chapel was built with donations from Mariana Tuttle Arnot-Ogden as a memorial to her parents, John Arnot and Harriet Arnot, her sister, Aurelia Arnot, and her husband, William B. Ogden. The principal window over the chancel was designed to symbolically represent the four people whom the chapel memorialized. This window was designed and executed by stained glass craftsman Donald MacDonald of Boston, Massachusetts. The decoration of the interior of the chapel was designed and executed by Cyrus L. W. Eidlitz of New York City.

== Sports complex ==
After closing in September 2020, the church sat dormant until 2023 when it was purchased by a local entrepreneur for conversion to a sports complex. Empire Sports of the Southern Tier features field turf inside the cathedral, batting cages, basketball, cornhole, and other activities. The new owner Ryan McFall of Corning, has promised to maintain the church's stained glass windows, pipe organs, and overall brick structure.

== Rectors of Trinity ==
- The Rev. Thomas Clark - July 20, 1833 - 1836
- The Rev. Richard Smith - February 29, 1836 - May 1838
- The Rev. Gordon Winslow - June 1838 - June 1841
- The Rev. Kendrick Metcalf, D.D. - 1841 - 1842
- The Rev. Stephen Douglas - 1842 -1844
- The Rev. Washington VanZandt - February 1844 - February 1847
- The Rev. Dr. Andrew D. Hull, D.D. - July 1849 - 1866
- The Rev. William Paret - 1866 - April 1869
- The Rev. George H. McKnight, D.D. - July 1869 - 1905
- The Rev. Charles McKnight - 1906 - September 1911
- The Rev. Herbert L. Hannah - December 1911 - January 1917
- The Rev. Henry E. Hubbard - June 1917 - August 1953
- The Rev. David Kingman - September 1953 December 1974
- The Rev. John C. Humphries Jr. - September 1975 - December 1997
- The Rev. Dr. William C. Lutz - September 1999– 2022
