= Henry C. Dudley =

American architect

Henry Dudley
- Born: 1813
- Died: 1894
- Occupation: Architect
- Buildings: Carlheim; St. Paul's Cathedral; St. Peter's Episcopal Church

Henry C. Dudley (1813–1894), known also as Henry Dudley, was an English-born North American architect, known for his Gothic Revival churches. He was a founding member of the American Institute of Architects and designed a large number of churches, among them Saint Paul's Episcopal Cathedral in Syracuse, New York, built in 1884, and Trinity Church (Elmira, New York), completed in 1858. He was elevated to the AIA College of Fellows in 1857.

== Career ==
He partnered with architect Frank Wills, whom he knew from their days working together in Exeter, England for John Hayward, and worked on a number of churches with him. After Wills' sudden death in April 1857, Dudley is believed to have completed the Episcopal Church of the Nativity (Huntsville, Alabama), which is now a National Historic Landmark. He also worked on his own and with Frederick Diaper.

== Prominent works ==
Many of Dudley's works are listed on the National Register of Historic Places (NRHP). Buildings designed by Dudley include:

- Carlheim, located north of Leesburg, Virginia on U.S. 15, NRHP-listed
- Church of the Holy Trinity and Rectory, 381 Main St. and 144 Broad St., Middletown, Connecticut, NRHP-listed
- Episcopal Church of the Nativity, 212 Eustis St., Huntsville, Alabama, NRHP-listed
- Grace Church (Episcopal,) 14 Boltwood Avenue, Amherst, Massachusetts, contributing property in an NRHP-listed historic district
- Park-McCullough House, 1 Park St. North Bennington, Vermont, NRHP-listed
- St. George's Church, Flushing, New York, NRHP-listed
- St. James' Episcopal Church and Parish House, 2500 Jerome Ave. Bronx, New York, NRHP-listed
- St. John's Episcopal Church (Montgomery, Alabama), 113 Madison Ave. Montgomery, Alabama, NRHP-listed
- St. John's Episcopal Church, in the Downtown Waterbury Historic District, Waterbury, Connecticut, contributing property in an NRHP-listed historic district
- St. John's Episcopal Church and Rectory, 15 St. John's St., Monticello, New York, NRHP-listed
- St. Mark's Episcopal Church, Main St., Hoosick Falls, New York, NRHP-listed
- St. Paul's Cathedral and Parish House, 310 Montgomery St., Syracuse, New York, NRHP-listed
- St. Peter's Episcopal Church Complex, 169 Genesee St., Auburn, New York, NRHP-listed
- St. Peter's Episcopal Church (Niagara Falls, New York)
- Trinity Episcopal Church, 1900 Dauphin St., Mobile, Alabama, NRHP-listed
- Trinity Church (Elmira, New York), 304 N. Main St., Elmira, New York, NRHP-listed
- Trinity Church Lansingburgh, 585 Fourth Ave., Troy, New York, NRHP-listed
- Trinity Episcopal Church Complex, 335 Fourth Ave., Mount Vernon, New York, NRHP-listed
- Trinity Episcopal Church, contributing property in what is now the NRHP-listed Tariffville Historic District, in Tariffville, Connecticut.
- one or more buildings in NRHP-listed West Main Street-West James Street Historic District, in Richfield Springs, New York
- Christ Episcopal Church, in Red Wing, Minnesota, named by the National Trust for Historic Preservation to its 2008 distinctive destinations list.

Two churches believed to be the work of Wills and Dudley will likely have had increased involvement by Dudley, due to their completion after Will's death:

- Church of the Nativity (Union, South Carolina), 1856–59
- Trinity Church (Natchitoches, Louisiana), 1857–1860

== Gallery ==
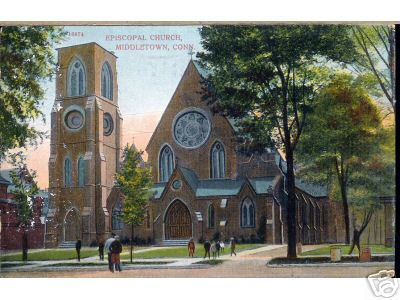
Postcard view of Middletown, Connecticut one

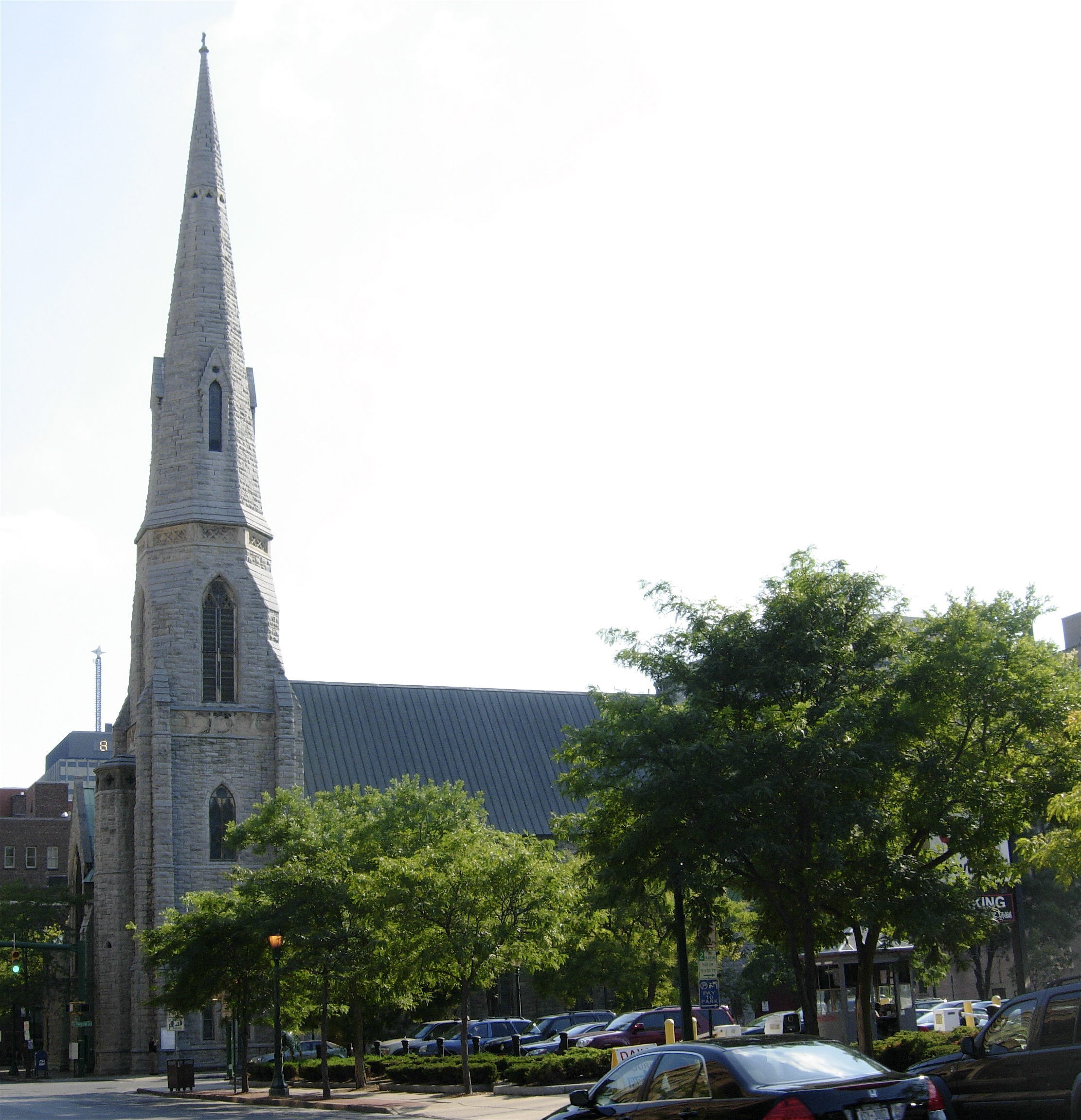
Syracuse, New York one

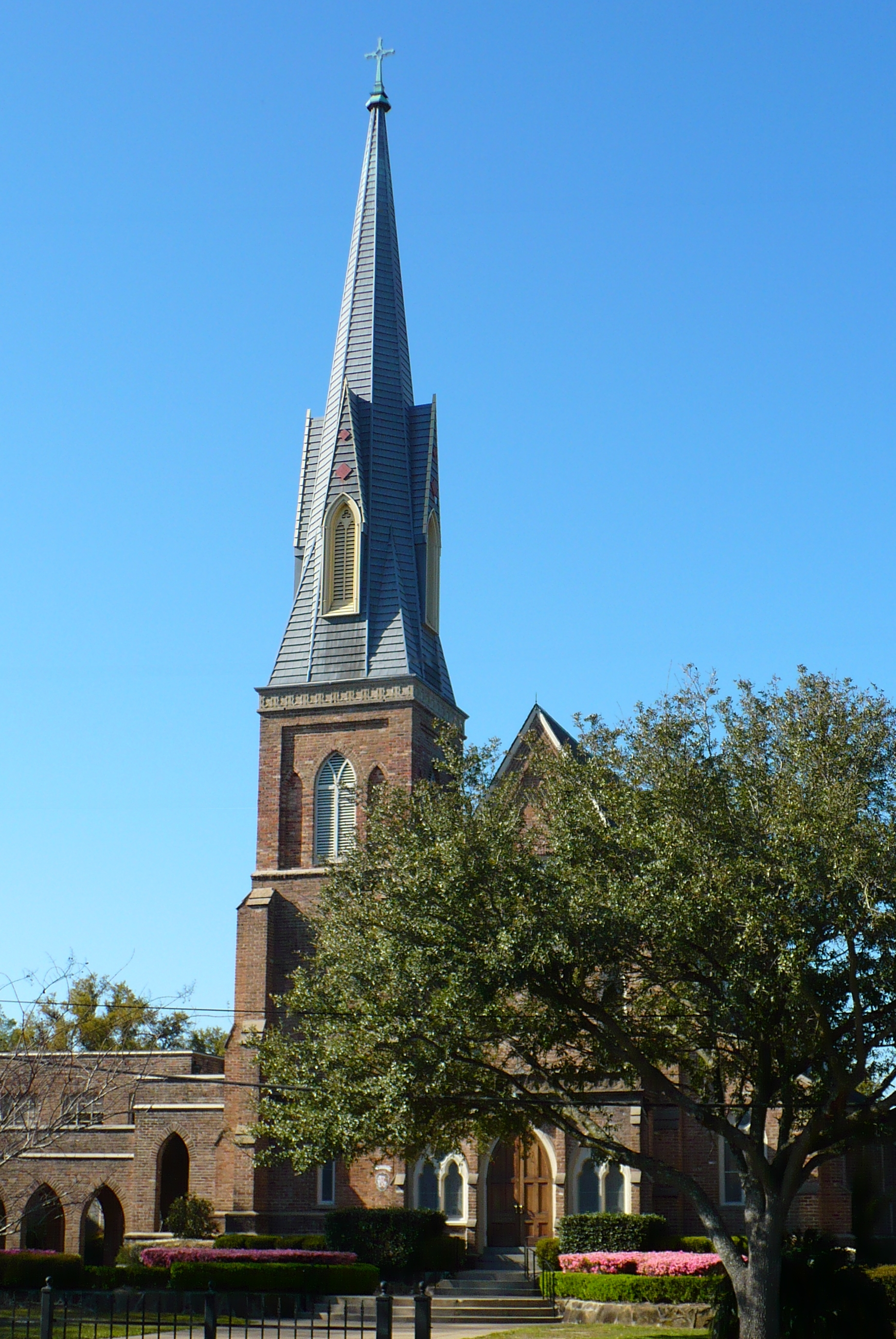
Mobile, Alabama one

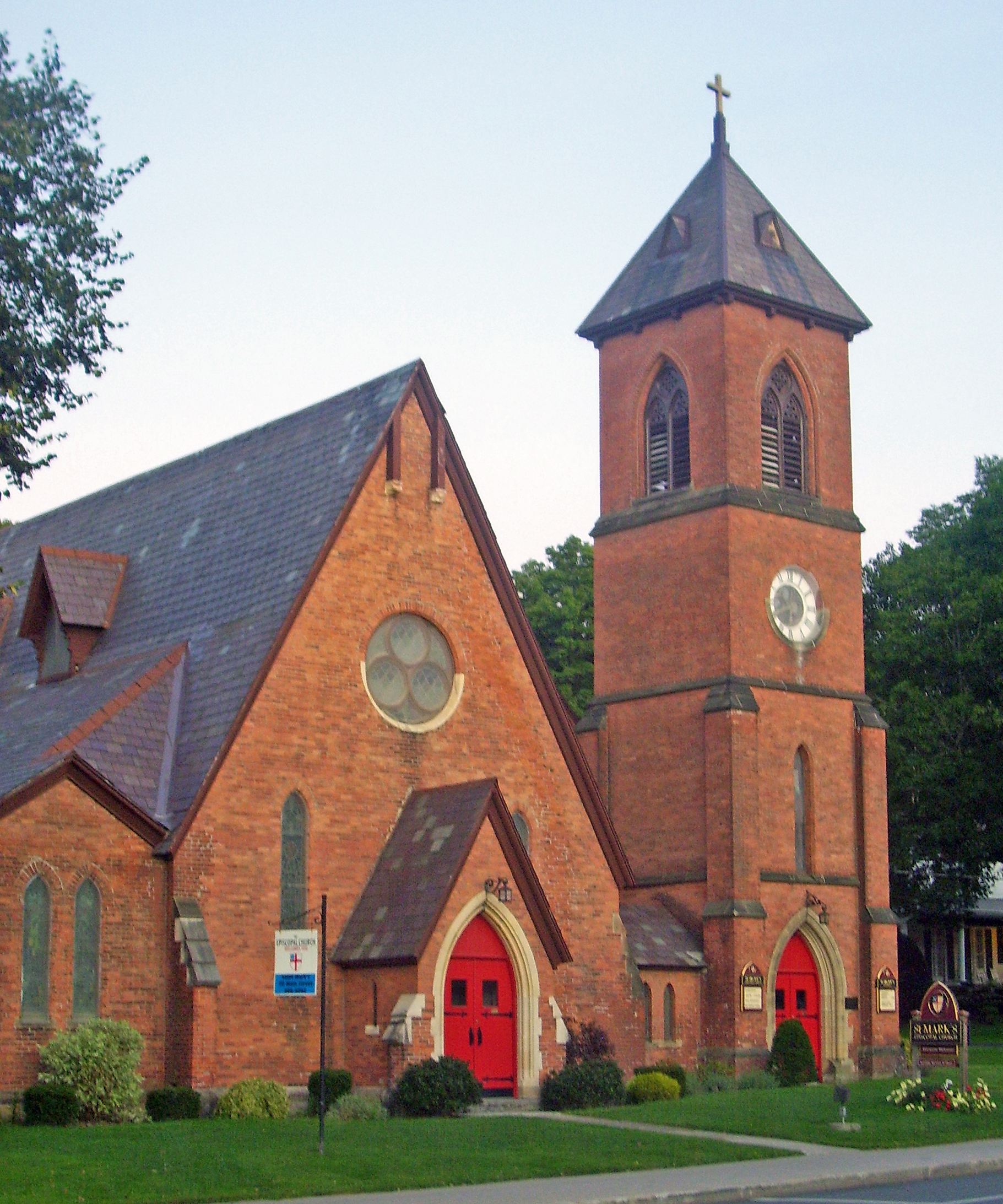
Hoosick Falls, New York one

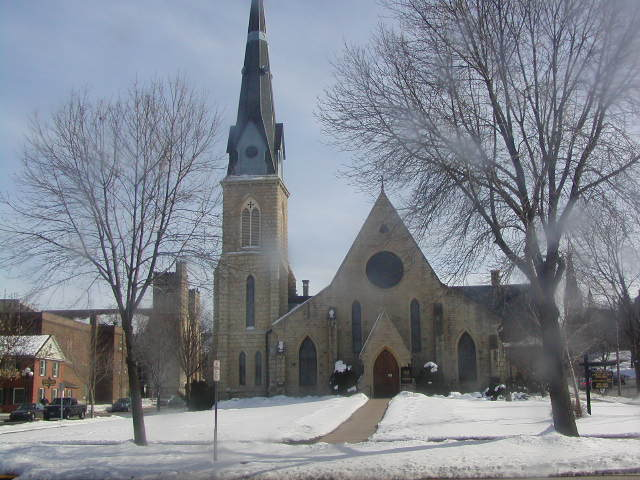
Red Wing, Minnesota one
