= Christ Episcopal Church (Red Wing, Minnesota) =

Historic church in Minnesota, United States

Coordinates: 44°33′49″N 92°32′7.7″W

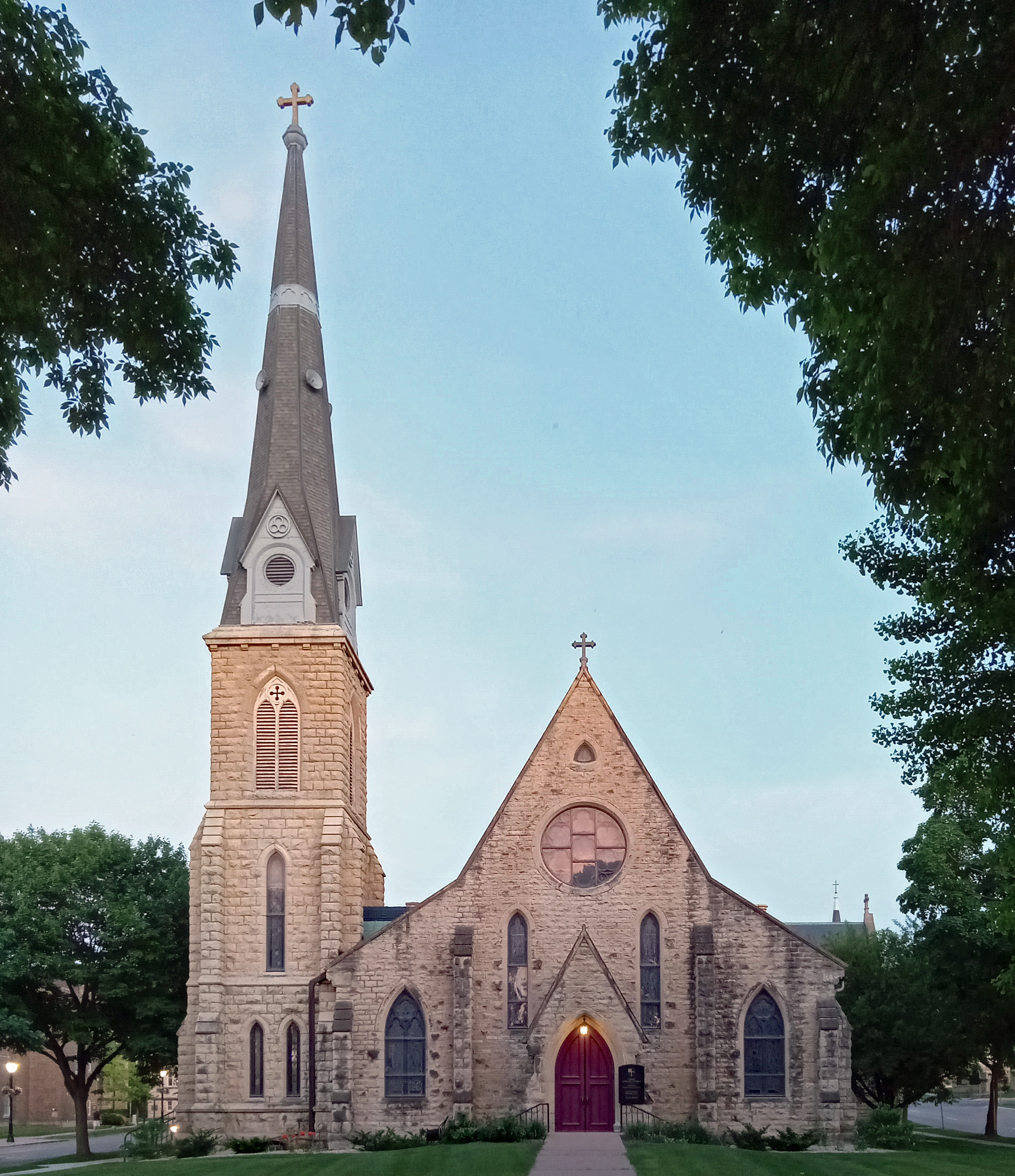
Christ Episcopal Church viewed from the northwest

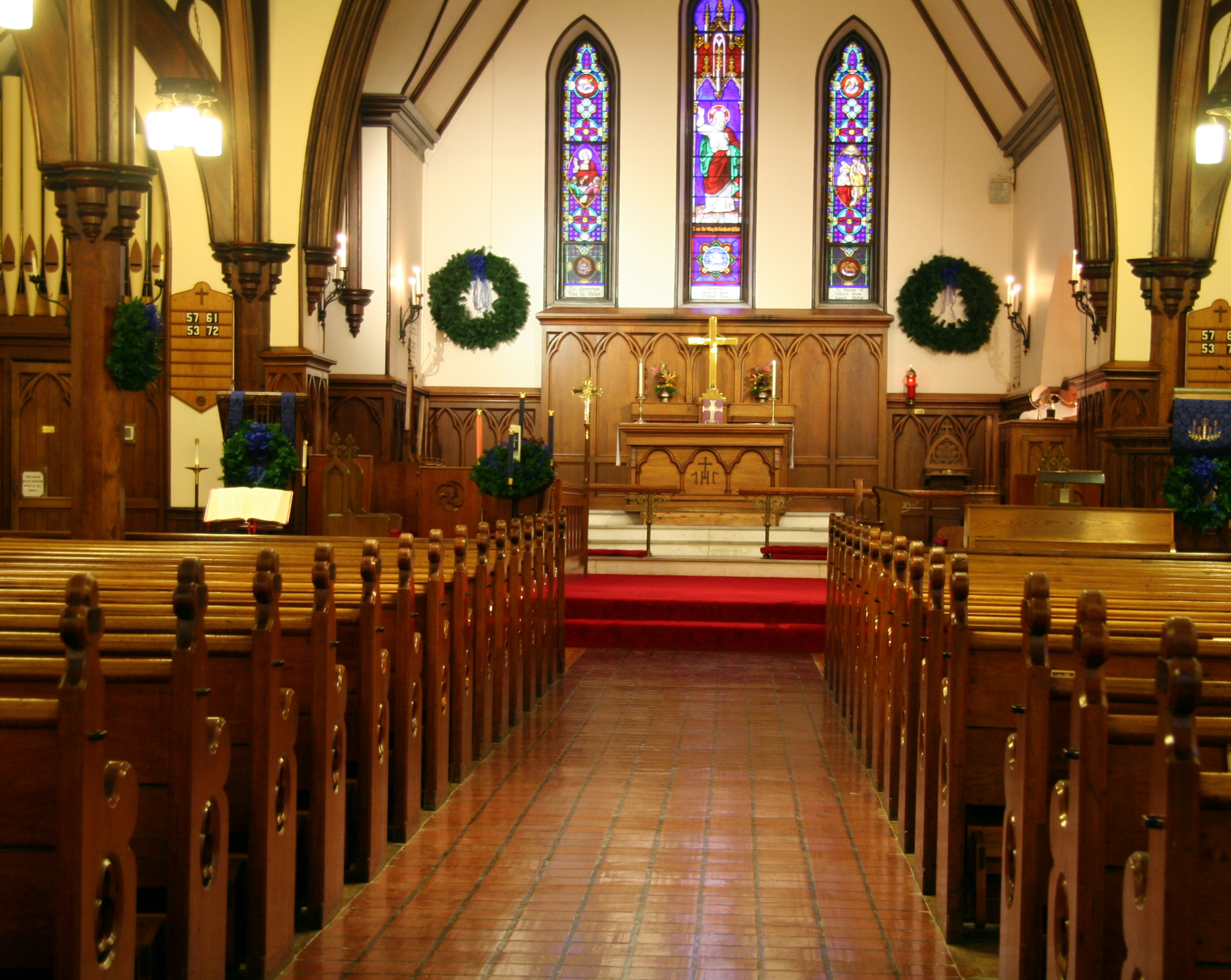
The church interior, decorated for the season of Advent

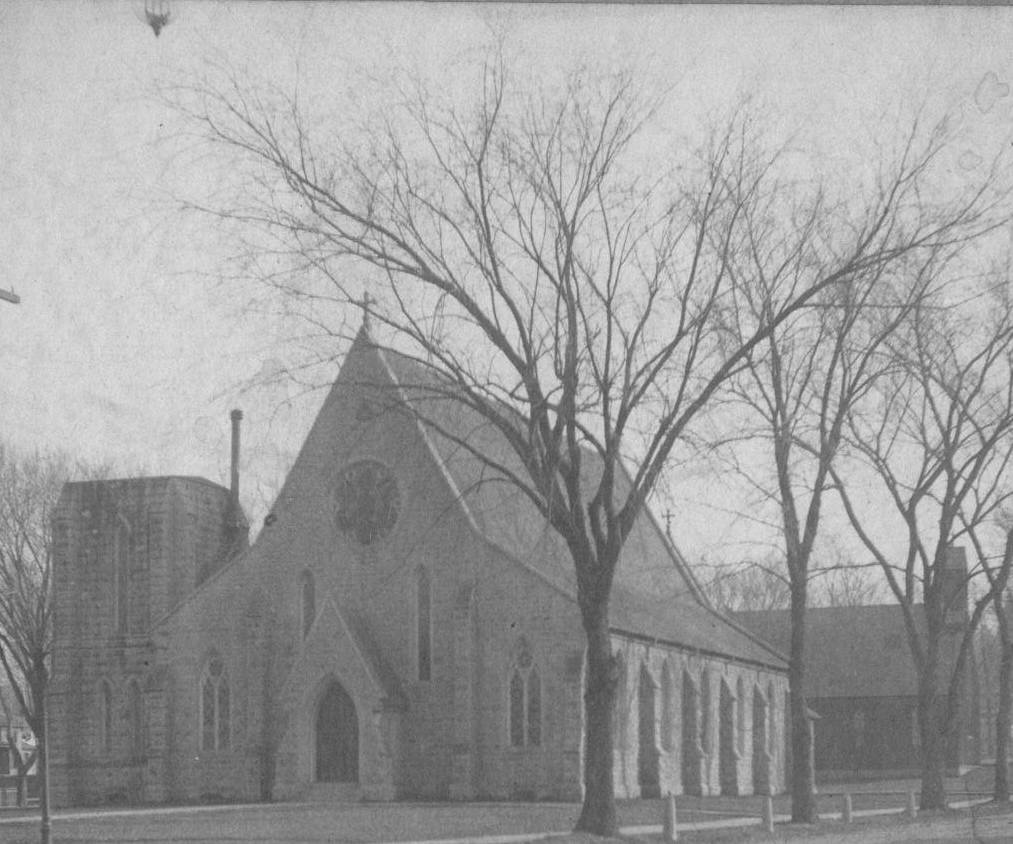
Exterior of the church before the steeple was added

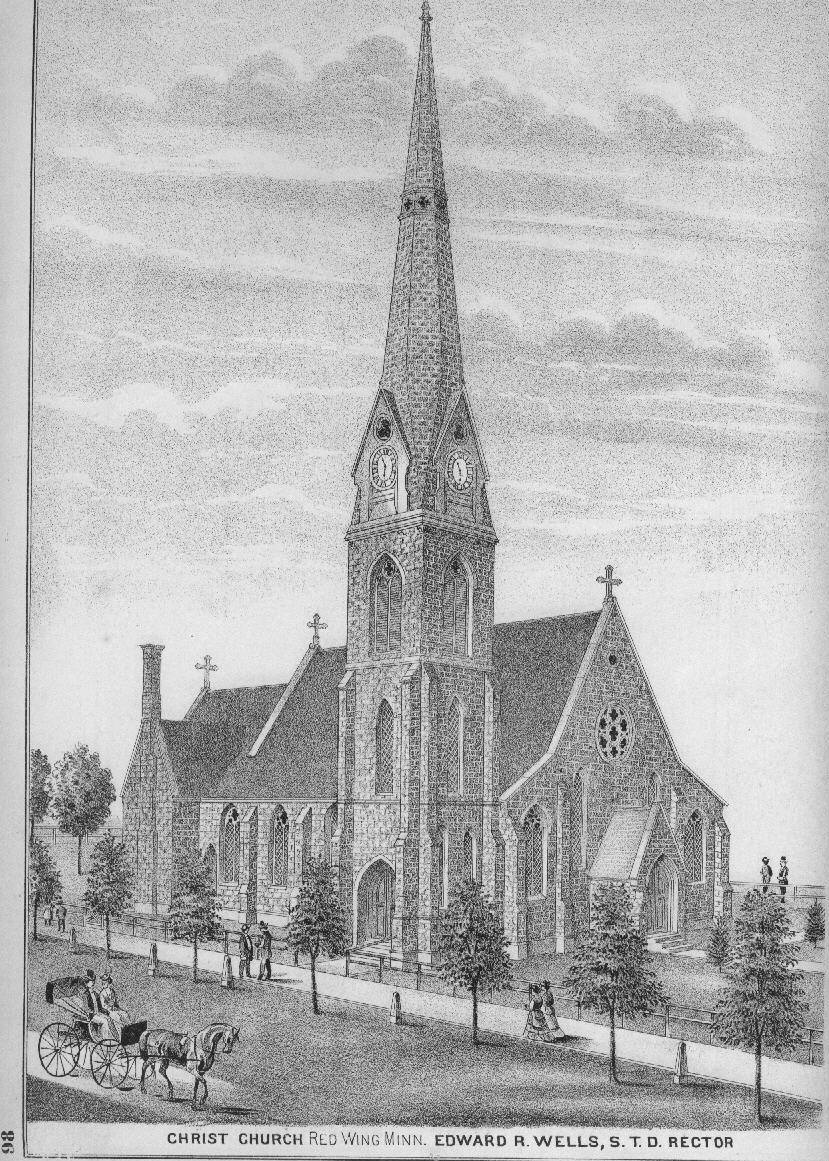
Christ Episcopal Church, An Illustrated Atlas of the State of Minnesota, (Alfred T Andreas, plate 98, Chicago, 1874)

The parish of Christ Episcopal Church in Red Wing, Minnesota, United States, was founded in 1858. It is a congregation of the Episcopal Diocese of Minnesota. The church's priest in charge is the Rev. Aaron Twait.

The church reported 298 members in 2015 and 192 members in 2023; no membership statistics were reported in 2024 parochial reports. Plate and pledge income reported for the congregation in 2024 was $205,422 with average Sunday attendance (ASA) of 56 persons. This was a relative decrease from ASA of 102 reported in 2017.

== History and building ==
A wooden building was erected that served the early parish well, but by 1868 it was felt that the growth of the parish made the building of a larger church a necessity.

In the autumn of that year work began on the new building, constructed in Gothic Revival style following plans furnished by New York architect Henry C. Dudley.

- D.C. Hill was contracted to do the basic carpentry work; George H. Davis provided the finished carpentry (seats, columns, tracery, wainscoting; all of butternut finished in oil).
- G.A. Carlson carried out the stonework with magnesian limestone from his quarries.
- The windows were furnished by a "Mr. Sharpe from New York."

The cornerstone was laid June 24, 1869 and the new church was consecrated by Bishop Henry Benjamin Whipple on December 19, 1871. (Due to concerns about the foundations, the steeple was not added until 1897.)

The church is a contributing property to the Red Wing Mall Historic District, which is listed on the National Register of Historic Places.
