= Leesburg Historic District (Leesburg, Virginia) =

Historic district in Virginia, United States

- U.S. National Register of Historic Places
- U.S. Historic district
- Virginia Landmarks Register
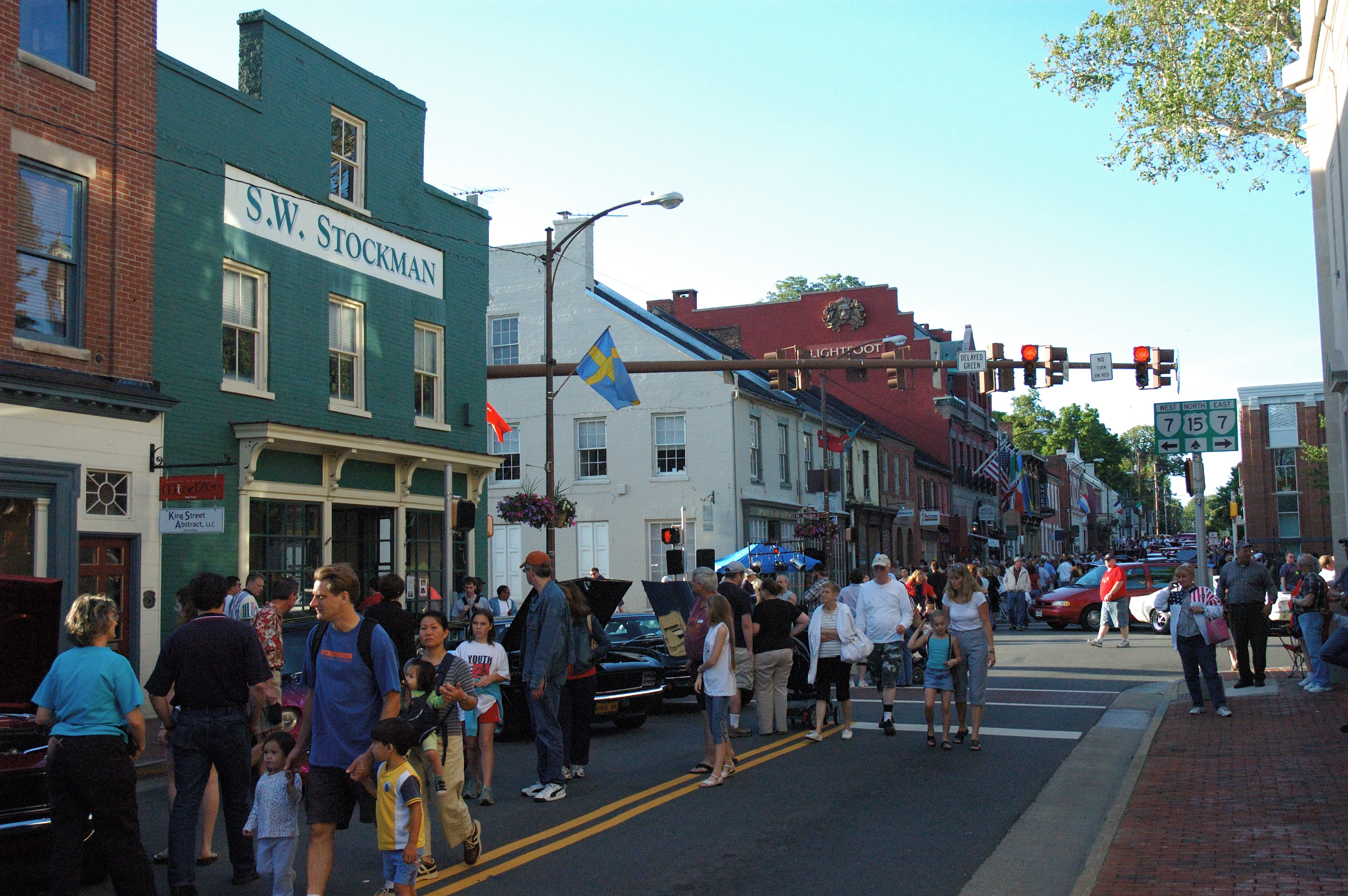

- Location within Northern Virginia Location within Virginia Location within the United States
- Location: Area of the original town centered at jct. of U.S. 15 and VA 9 (original); Roughly bounded by North, Union Sts., Morven park Rd., and Harrison St. (increase); in Leesburg, Virginia
- Coordinates: 39°6′53″N 77°33′57″W
- Area: 365 acres (148 ha)
- Built: 1758 (original); 1757 (increase)
- Architect: French, Daniel, III; et al. (increase)
- Architectural style: Classical Revival, Greek Revival (original); Georgian, et al. (increase)
- NRHP reference No.: 70000807 (original); 02000531 (increase)
- VLR No.: 253-0035

Significant dates
- Added to NRHP: February 26, 1970 (original); May 22, 2002 (increase)
- Designated VLR: December 2, 1969, December 5, 2001

The Leesburg Historic District in Leesburg, Virginia is a historic district that includes Classical Revival, Greek Revival, and Georgian architecture and dates back to 1757. It was listed on the National Register of Historic Places in 1970 and its boundaries were increased in 2002.

== Additional Properties ==
=== Carlheim ===
In 2004, the Victorian era Second Empire - Italianate influenced Carlheim Mansion and 16-acre (65,000 m^{2}) grounds (a.k.a. "Paxton") were added as a non-contiguous part of the Leesburg Historic District. The property is held in private trust and became the home of the Margaret Paxton Memorial Learning and Resource Campus, which includes the Aurora School, in November 2009.

== See also ==
- Loudoun County Courthouse, contributing property in the district
- Thomas Balch Library, contributing property in the district
- National Register of Historic Places listings in Loudoun County, Virginia
