= Loudoun County Courthouse =

Historic courthouse in Virginia, US

- U.S. National Register of Historic Places
- U.S. National Historic Landmark
- U.S. Historic district – Contributing property
- Virginia Landmarks Register
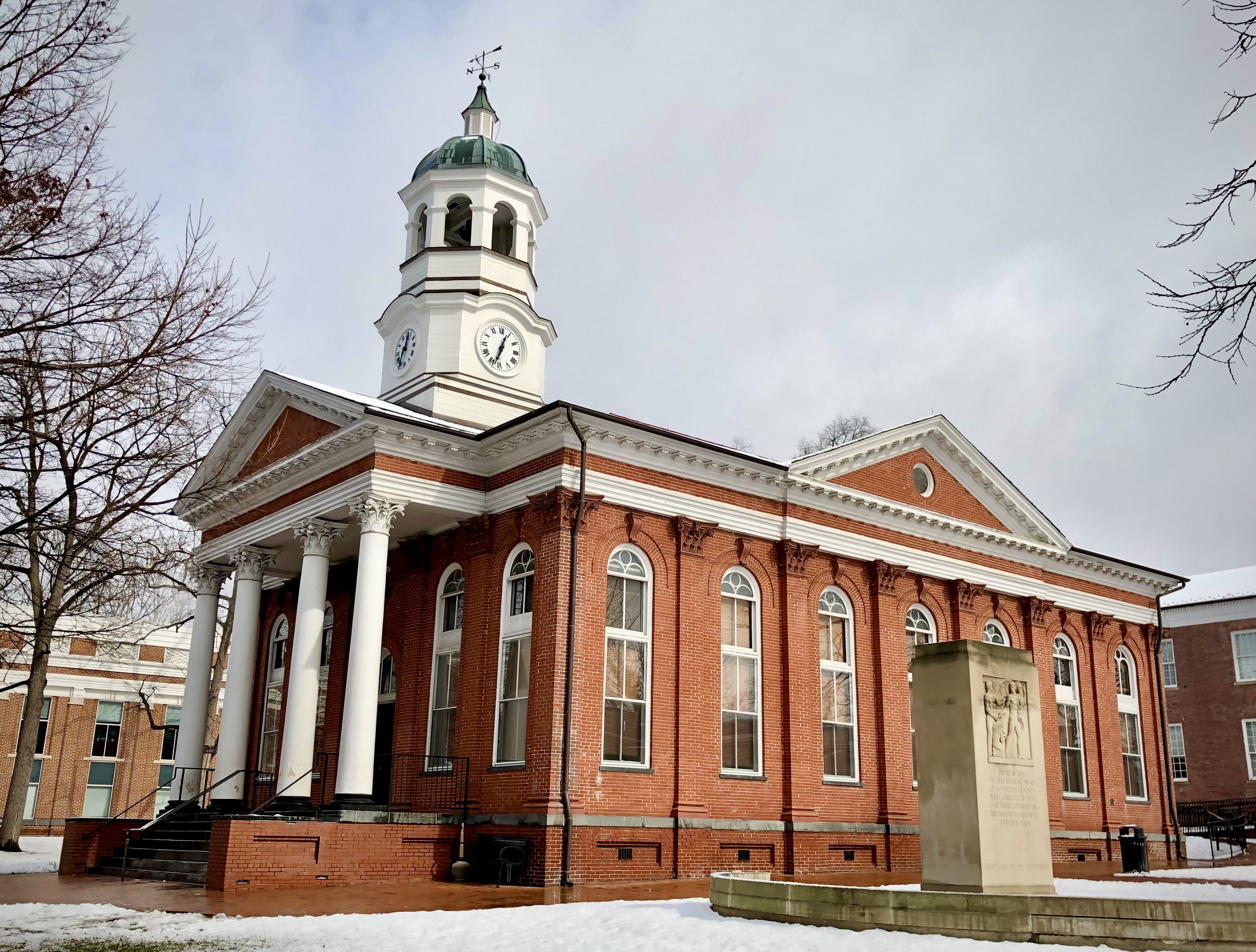
- The courthouse in 2021

- Location within Northern Virginia Location within Virginia Location within the United States
- Interactive map showing the location of the Loudoun County Courthouse
- Location: 10 N King Street (18 E Market Street), Leesburg, Virginia
- Coordinates: 39°6′56″N 77°33′50″W
- Area: 1.5 acres (0.61 ha)
- Architect: William Callis West
- Part of: Leesburg Historic District (ID70000807)
- NRHP reference No.: 100011372
- VLR No.: 253-0006

Significant dates
- Added to NRHP: December 13, 2024
- Designated NHL: December 13, 2024
- Designated VLR: December 13, 2024

The Loudoun County Courthouse, officially the Charles Hamilton Houston Courthouse, is a historic building at 18 East Market Street in Leesburg, Virginia, United States. Built in 1895, this building is Loudoun County's third courthouse. In 1933–1934, it was the venue of the Commonwealth of Virginia v. Crawford case, the first legal case in the Southern United States with an all-black legal team. To commemorate the advances in black Americans' involvement in the legal field resulting from Commonwealth of Virginia v. Crawford, the courthouse was designated a National Historic Landmark in 2024. It is formally named for Charles Hamilton Houston, the lawyer who defended that case.

The courthouse was designed by William Callis West. It is a rectangular brick building measuring 49 by 74 feet (15 by 23 m) wide. It has a main entrance portico facing northeast, as well as a wooden clock tower above it. Inside, a vestibule leads to a large courtroom with spectator galleries, which takes up most of the space. There are also secondary spaces in the rear or southeast.

== Site ==
The Loudoun County Courthouse (officially the Charles Hamilton Houston Courthouse) is located at 18 East Market Street in Leesburg, Virginia, United States. It sits at the east corner of East Market Street and North King Street; the street grid is slightly rotated from true north so that, for example, King Street runs north-northeast to south-southwest. The courthouse is located within the Leesburg Historic District, which is on the National Register of Historic Places. When the courthouse was built, the grounds occupied 1.5 acres (0.61 ha). This includes 1 acre (0.40 ha) that was reserved for the original courthouse on the site in 1757, as well as a 1/2-acre (0.20 ha) parcel added in 1873. By 2020, the Loudoun County Courthouse was part of a court complex that spanned 5 acres (2.0 ha).

The courthouse grounds are surrounded by a decorative cast-iron fence dating from 1853 to 1861. The fences are interspersed with arched gates, which lead to brick walkways from Market and King streets. There are ramps, benches, flagpoles, mature trees, fragments of columns from a previous courthouse, and a brick base.

=== Memorials ===
There are three war memorials in a straight line just south of the courthouse (near Market Street). These memorials consist of a stone World War I monument (1922), a monolithic World War II and Korean War memorial (1956) by Walter Hancock, and a stone Vietnam War memorial (1988). The World War I monument consists of a plaque with the names of soldiers who died in the war; the names were originally separated based on the deceased's races, but a plaque with the names desegregated was installed in 2021. The Vietnam War memorial has plaques honoring Iraq and Afghanistan war veterans as well.

Northeast of the courthouse is an American Revolutionary War monument (2015), sited near the spot where the United States Declaration of Independence was read shortly after the US declared independence in 1776. Northwest of the courthouse was formerly a Confederate war monument, installed in 1908 and removed in 2020.

== Architecture ==
The Loudoun County Courthouse was designed in 1894–1895 by William Callis West and modified in 1956 by Albert D. Lueders. The courthouse contains the archives of Loudoun County's court cases, tax records, deeds, wills, and military records, along with other documents.

=== Exterior ===
The courthouse is a rectangular brick building measuring 49 by 74 feet (15 by 23 m). It has a raised basement, above which is a protruding water table made of slate; the ground slopes up toward the rear (east). The raised basement contains grilles on its northeastern and southwestern (side) elevations, which provide access to a crawl space under the building. The facade's shorter and longer elevations are divided vertically into 5 by 7 bays respectively. The bays are separated by pedestals in the basement and pilasters on the upper stories, both of which are made of brick. The northwestern and southwestern elevations, which face the street, contain metal modillions and terracotta column capitals in the Corinthian order. The northeastern and southeastern elevations face inward and have simpler decorations; they lack modillions, and the column capitals are made of plain horizontal bands. Most bays contain tall arched windows with slate windowsills; there are also scrolled keystones in some bays and oculus windows near entrances.

The northwestern elevation has a portico, accessed by a set of slate steps that ascend slightly to an elevated porch. The portico has four cylindrical brick columns clad with plaster, above which are an architrave, a plain brick frieze, and a metal cornice with modillions. The main entrance is under the portico and consists of a large archway with wooden reveals on its side faces, past which is a pair of wooden doors. Above the arch is a scroll-shaped terracotta keystone and a transom window. Two additional entrances exist on the rear or southeast elevation: one in the central bay and one to the right of there.

The courthouse has a hip roof consisting of gables on the northeast, southeast, and southwest elevations, and a portico on the northwest elevation. The gables surround a central roof made of standing seam metal. Above the inner section of the portico rises a clock tower measuring 66 feet (20 m) tall. Made of wood with a square cross section, it has four faces with segmental arches, three of which have clock faces. It is topped by an octagonal belfry, domed copper roof, cupola, and weather vane. The bell in the belfry weighs 311 pounds (141 kg), though accounts differ on whether it dates from the current building's construction in 1894 or from much earlier.

=== Interior ===
The majority of the building's interior is occupied by a rectangular courtroom. This room is accessed by a square vestibule just past the portico, at the building's northwestern end. The vestibule has two pairs of doors (one from the entrance and one leading inside), as well as two side doorways. The room's baseboard has molded caps. The entrance vestibule functions in part as structural support for a pair of spectator galleries on the second floor. Immediately above the vestibule is a square space that leads to the galleries.

The courtroom spans about 45 by 50 feet (14 by 15 m) across with a coved plaster ceiling measuring 22 feet (6.7 m) high. The judge's dais is on the southeastern wall, opposite the vestibule entrance; there is a jury box in the eastern corner, right of the judge's dais. There is also a wooden railing bisecting the room, separating the spectators' seating to the northwest and the judge and jury to the southeast. The room is illuminated by brass chandeliers and has red carpets and painted plaster walls. Ornate woodwork, including the railing and benches, is situated throughout. On the upper level are spectator galleries, which extend above the entrance vestibule. The undersides of the galleries are sloped and are covered with plaster. The galleries themselves have wooden seating, balusters, and spandrels; they are accessed by stairs in the northeast corner.

The southeastern end of the courthouse has hallways leading to secondary spaces such as bathrooms, offices, a conference room, and a utility room. Accessed by both the rear door and the courtroom, it includes the judge's chambers. A staircase ascends to the second floor. The secondary spaces were expanded in 1956 when the courtroom's rear wall was relocated.

== History ==
=== Early courthouses ===
Loudoun County was established in 1757. The first courthouse, a brick structure measuring 40 by 28 feet (12.2 by 8.5 m), was built shortly afterward in 1758. Next to this courthouse, Nicholas Minor donated some of his land for the establishment of Leesburg. The Leesburg town market was built next to the courthouse in 1792, lasting for over six decades. During the War of 1812, the original courthouse was a repository for several of the United States' founding documents, including a copy of the United States Declaration of Independence.

The second courthouse was completed in 1811 and was demolished about 1888. It had a brick facade with large stone columns, and was surrounded by a lawn with an iron railing. Behind the courthouse was a two-story clerk's office. Among the second courthouse's cases was an 1840 trial where the lawyer John Janney defended Leonard Andrew Grimes, a freedman who was accused of sheltering escaped slaves.

=== 1890s to 1930s: New courthouse ===
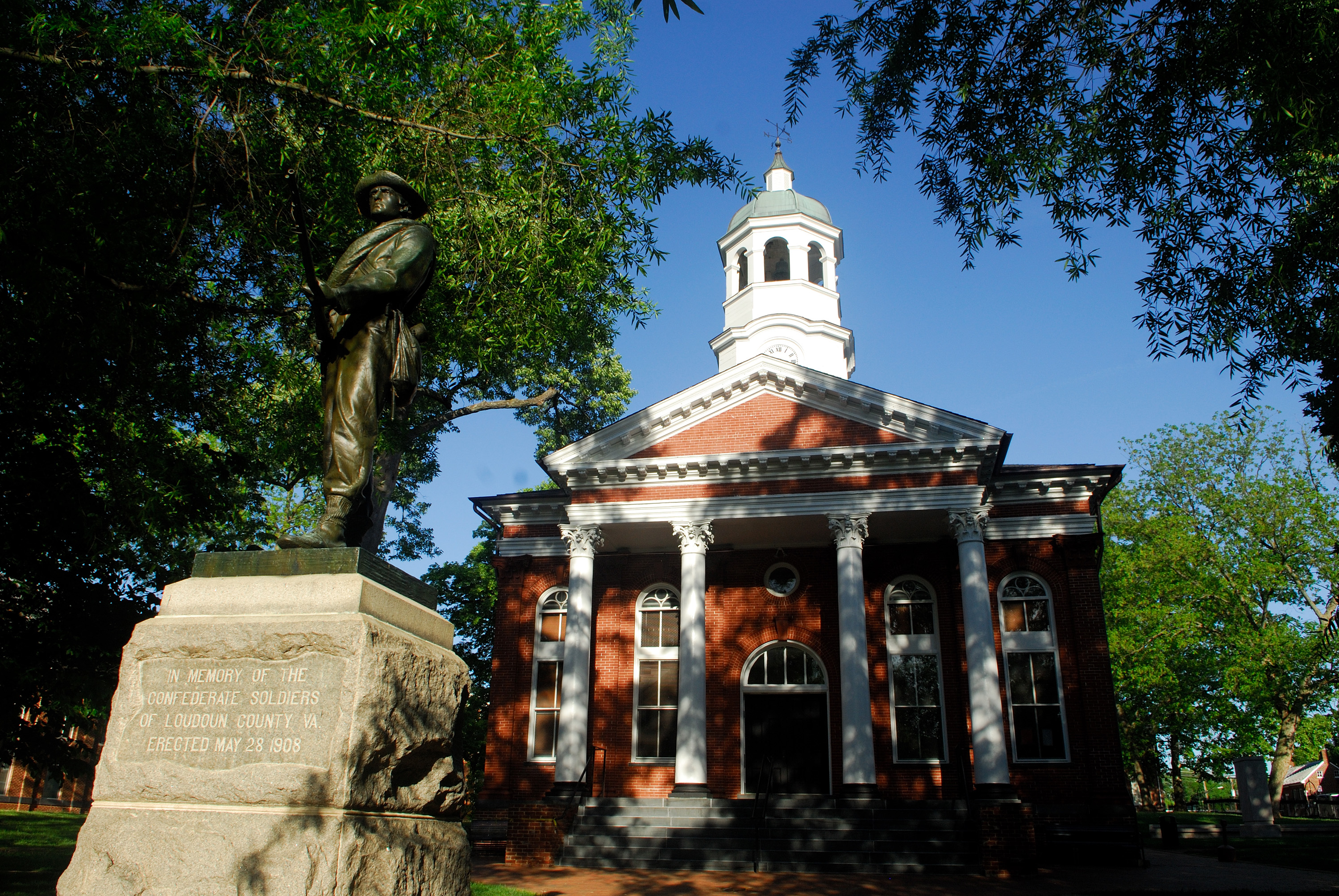
The Confederate statue that was later removed

The cornerstone of the third courthouse was laid in April 1894, at a ceremony attended by 2,000 people. Norris Brothers, a local firm, was hired to construct the building. The courthouse was completed in 1895. At the time, downtown Leesburg was predominantly white and highly segregated.

In 1908, the United Daughters of the Confederacy installed Silent Sentinel, a Confederate monument on the courthouse's lawn. The monument, sculpted by Frederick William Sievers, cost $3,000 to build. In 1922, a tablet memorializing Leesburg's World War I casualties was dedicated on the lawn, near the Confederate monument. Portraits of five prominent Virginia residents by local artist Edward Nichols were installed in the courthouse in 1925.

=== Commonwealth of Virginia v. Crawford ===
From 1933 to 1934, the Loudoun County Courthouse was the site of the trial for Commonwealth of Virginia v. Crawford. The defendant was George Crawford, a black chauffeur accused of murdering wealthy widow Agnes Boeing Ilsley and her white maid Mina Buckner in Middleburg, Virginia, in 1932. Crawford fled north and was arrested in Boston, Massachusetts, in January 1933. Crawford did not want to be extradited to Virginia, where black people were never included on grand juries, and where, on several occasions, black men accused (but not convicted) of crimes against white female victims had been lynched. In October 1933, the Supreme Court of the United States preserved a lower court's ruling demanding his extradition to Virginia.

The National Association for the Advancement of Colored People (NAACP) organized a legal team led by Charles Hamilton Houston, consisting entirely of black lawyers. This was the first legal case in the Southern United States with an all-black legal team; prior to Commonwealth of Virginia v. Crawford, the NAACP had relied on white lawyers. Crawford was ultimately found guilty in December 1933 and was subsequently sentenced to life imprisonment. Nonetheless, he avoided the death penalty, a mandatory sentence typically given in the Southern US to black men convicted of killing white women; everyone, including Crawford himself, had expected a death sentence. Commonwealth of Virginia v. Crawford helped increase the stature of black lawyers and juries in the US, and it preceded other cases such as Hollins v. Oklahoma and Norris v. Alabama, where black lawyers won more substantially.

=== 1940s to present ===
By the mid-1940s, the Loudoun County Courthouse was one of several buildings in Leesburg that The Washington Post described as eliciting pride among residents. The original cupola blew off the building in 1950 during a storm. A painting of President James Monroe was hung in the courthouse in 1952. The courtroom was remodeled in 1956, and eight murals of Loudoun County's history were hung in the courthouse the next year. In 1967, the county government ratified a deed from 1814, giving a 1,500-square-foot (140 m^{2}) section of the courthouse's lawn to the Leesburg town government. The site had formerly contained Leesburg's market house, but had never been transferred to the town government during its existence.

In 1991, the Courthouse Clocktower Committee launched an effort to raise $10,000 for a new cupola. The cupola was completed in 1994. An expansion of the existing courthouse took place between 1999 and 2004. As part of that project, which cost $30 million, Kallmann McKinnell & Wood and HDR Architecture expanded the courthouse complex to 10 courtrooms. The Loudoun County Courthouse was added to the National Park Service's National Underground Railroad Network program in 2003, in recognition of John Janney's 1840 defense of Grimes. Silent Sentinel was renovated in 2006 and was vandalized that year. An American Revolutionary War memorial was dedicated at the courthouse in 2015.

In 2020, amid ongoing removals of Confederate memorials across the US, the Silent Sentinel statue outside the courthouse was removed and given back to the United Daughters of the Confederacy. The next year, a new plaque was added to the World War I memorial to replace the original plaque, where the names had been racially segregated. As part of another expansion in the early 2020s, a new district courthouse, dedicated in October 2023, was built adjacent to the existing courthouse, giving the complex a third courthouse. That year, the original courthouse was officially renamed the Charles Hamilton Houston Courthouse in honor of Charles Hamilton Houston. It was rededicated in Houston's honor in September 2024; the local NAACP chapter leader, Michelle Thomas, said of the renaming that "We are giving justice a name in Loudoun County." It was declared a National Historic Landmark that December for its association with the Commonwealth of Virginia v. Crawford case. Further renovation of the court complex took place in 2025.

== See also ==
- List of National Historic Landmarks in Virginia
- National Register of Historic Places listings in Loudoun County, Virginia

== Sources ==
- Bradley, David (2014). Historic Murder Trial of George Crawford: Charles H. Houston, the NAACP and the Case That Put All-White Southern Juries on Trial. McFarland & Company, Incorporated Publishers. ISBN 978-0-7864-9468-2.
- Larson, Eric (2021). "Courthouse and Grounds: 263 Years of Loudoun's Court Complex" (PDF). Little Gems. Vol. VI, no. 1. Loudoun County Clerk of the Circuit Court Historic Records Division.
- Loudoun County Courthouse (PDF) (Report). National Register of Historic Places, National Park Service. December 13, 2024.
