= Trinity Episcopal Church Complex (Mount Vernon, New York) =

Historic church in New York, United States

- U.S. National Register of Historic Places
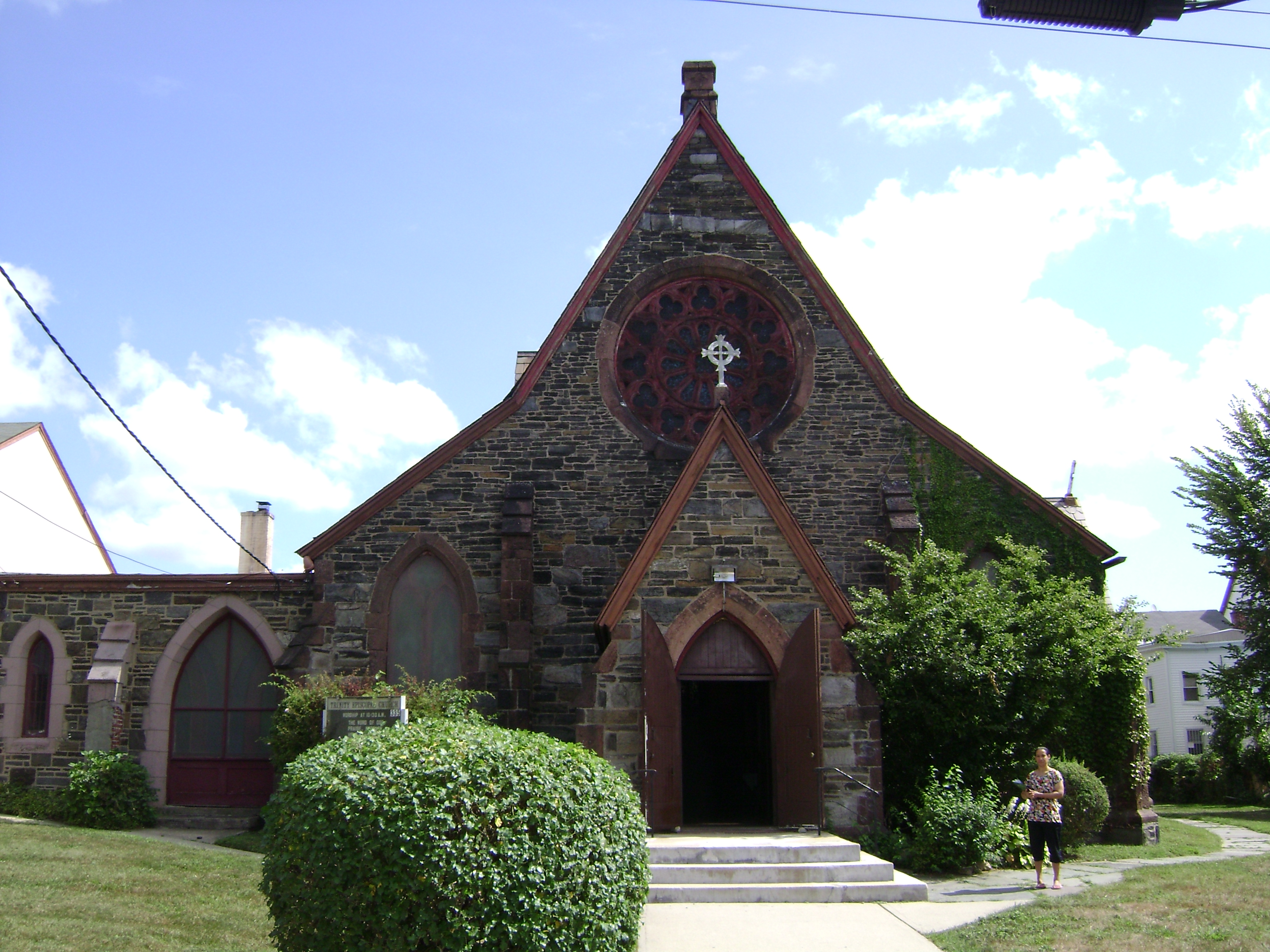
- Entrance to the church

- Location within New York Location within the United States
- Location: 335 Fourth Ave., Mount Vernon, New York
- Coordinates: 40°54′11″N 73°50′2″W
- Area: less than one acre
- Built: 1857
- Architect: Henry Dudley
- Architectural style: Gothic Revival
- NRHP reference No.: 97001494
- Added to NRHP: September 1, 1998

Trinity Episcopal Church Complex is a historic Episcopal church complex at 335 Fourth Avenue in Mount Vernon, Westchester County, New York. It is two blocks south of its mother church, Saint Paul's Church. The complex consists of the church (1859), old parish hall (1892), new parish hall (1909; 1954), and rectory (1893). The church, old parish hall, and new parish hall are connected to form an L-shaped building. The church was designed by Henry Dudley and built in the Gothic Revival style and enlarged and substantially redecorated in the 1880s. It is a one-story masonry structure with a steeply pitched, slate covered gable roof.

It was added to the National Register of Historic Places in 1997. The church closed in 2016.

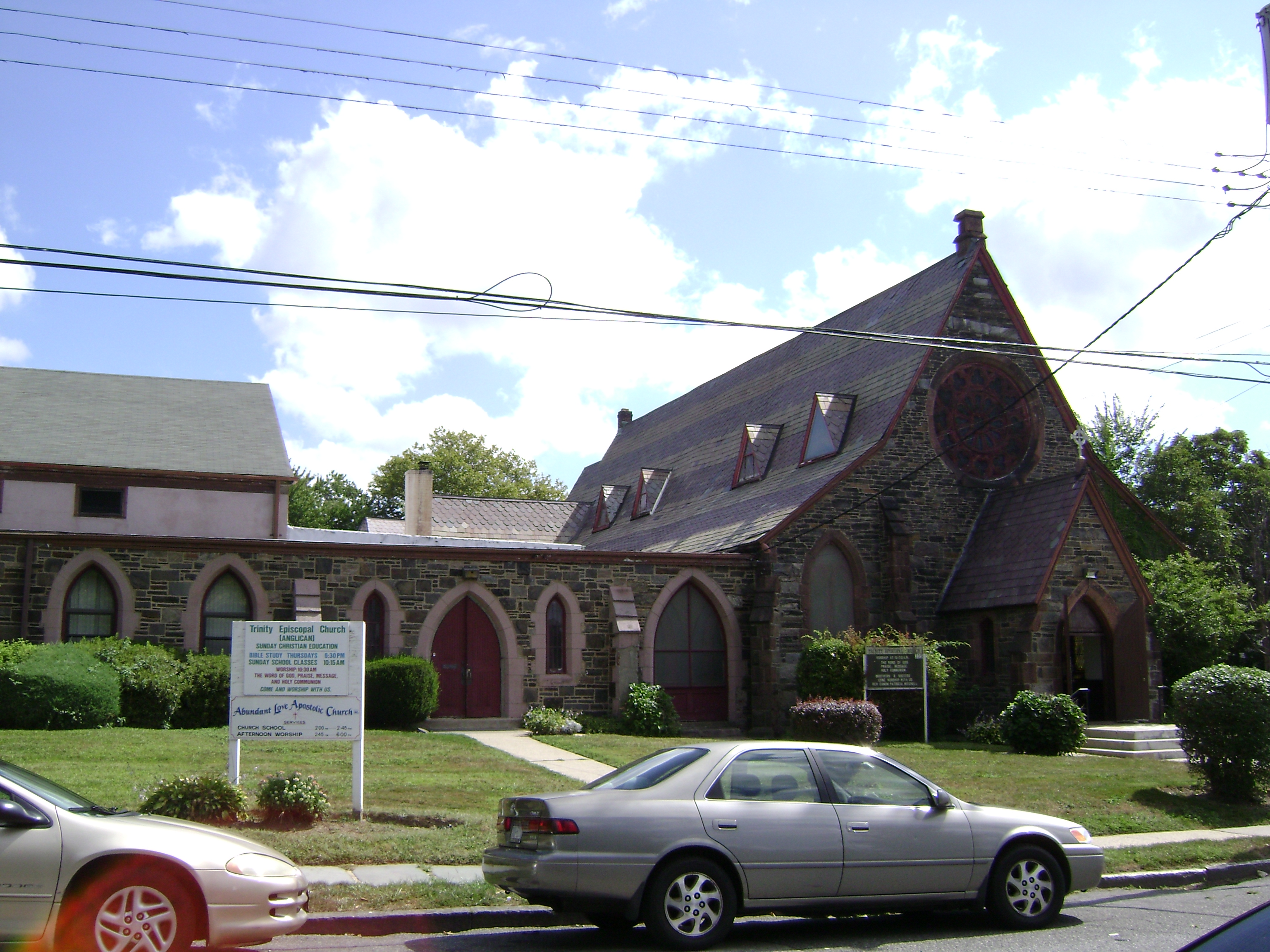
Another view of the church

== See also ==
- National Register of Historic Places listings in southern Westchester County, New York
