= Carlheim =

Historic house in Virginia, United States

- U.S. National Register of Historic Places
- U.S. Historic district – Contributing property
- Virginia Landmarks Register
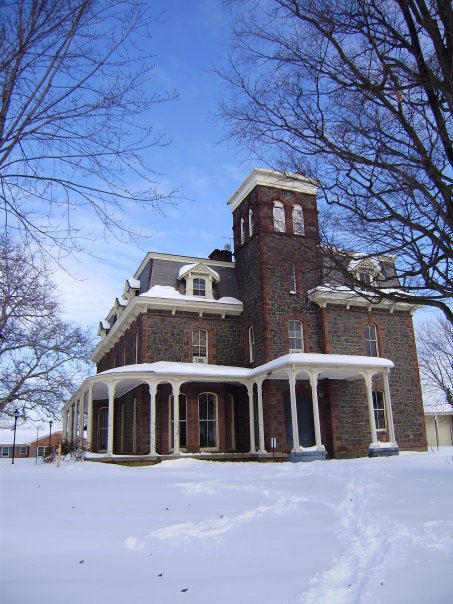
- Carlheim (Paxton Campus) Leesburg, Virginia

- Location within Northern Virginia Location within Virginia Location within the United States
- Nearest city: Leesburg, Virginia
- Coordinates: 39°7′21″N 77°33′28″W
- Area: 52 acres (21 ha)
- Built: 1872
- Architect: Dudley, Henry C.; Norris, John
- Architectural style: Second Empire, Italianate
- NRHP reference No.: 79003050
- VLR No.: 053-0380

Significant dates
- Added to NRHP: December 28, 1979
- Designated VLR: October 16, 1979

Carlheim (also called Paxton) is a mansion located in the northeast part of Leesburg, Virginia. It was constructed around 1872 for Pennsylvania industrialist Charles R. Paxton (1816–1889) and his wife, Rachel, who continued to live there until her death in December 1921. When constructed, it sat on over 760 acres (3.1 km^{2}) roughly bounded on the north end by the Red Rock Wilderness Overlook Regional Park, the Ball's Bluff Battlefield and the Potomac River. In accordance with Mrs. Paxton's will, the buildings and 50 surrounding acres were preserved and placed in a charitable trust to benefit "needy children."

Designed by New York architect Henry Dudley, the nearly 20,000-square-foot (1,900 m^{2}) 32-room Second Empire building was listed on the National Register of Historic Places in 1979 for its architectural and local significance. In 2004, the property became a non-contiguous part of the Leesburg Historic District. The estate of Mr. and Mrs. Paxton was originally accessed via a long, tree-lined driveway off King Street. Today, that entrance is gone and there are two more contemporary entrances; Wildman Street (normally closed) and the new main entrance that was completed in 2009 at 601 Catoctin Circle.

Buildings that remain from the original estate but are outside the present campus include the Farm Manager's Home (now the Exeter Community Clubhouse) and the stabilized creamery ruins at Red Rock Park along Edwards Ferry Road.

The mansion and remaining 16-acre (65,000 m^{2}) grounds were home to The Arc of Loudoun, Northern Virginia's premier advocacy, education and therapy organization dedicated to serving people with disabilities and their families, until 2025. The Arc's onsite programs include Ability Fitness Center, Aurora Behavior Clinic, Aurora School, A Life Like Yours ALLY Advocacy Center, and Open Door Learning Center.

The campus is privately owned.

The major annual fundraising events on the property until ended in 2022: include:

- Shocktober Haunted House (one of the scariest haunted houses in the U.S.) (October)
- My Bloody Valentine Haunted House (February)
