= Charles Hamilton Houston =

American lawyer (1895–1950)

Charles Houston
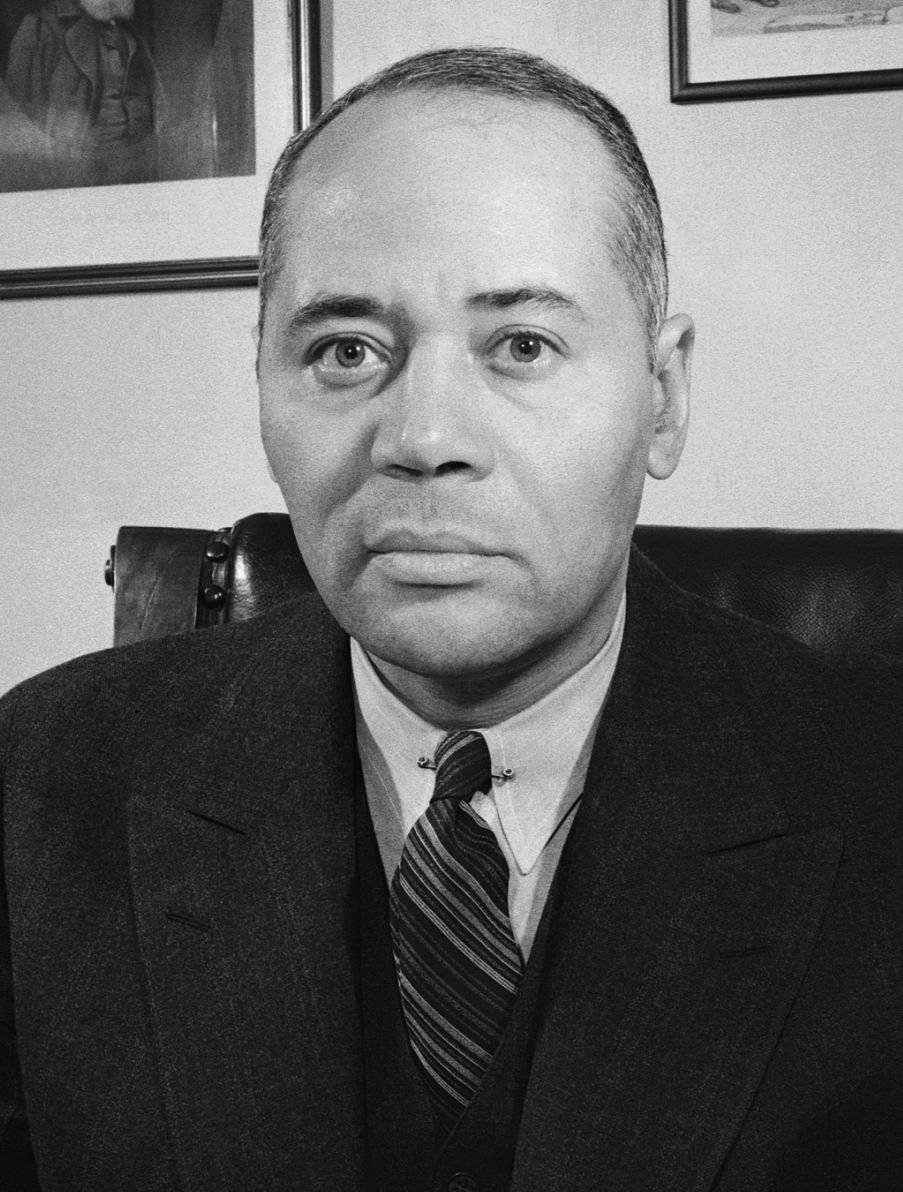
- Houston in 1939
- Born: Charles Hamilton Houston; September 3, 1895; Washington, D.C., U.S.
- Died: April 22, 1950 (aged 54); Washington, D.C., U.S.
- Resting place: Lincoln Memorial Cemetery
- Education: Amherst College (BA); Harvard University (LLB, LLM, SJD)
- Occupation: Lawyer
- Relatives: William H. Hastie (cousin)

Charles Hamilton Houston Sr. (September 3, 1895 – April 22, 1950) was an American lawyer. He was the dean of Howard University Law School and the first special counsel of the NAACP. A graduate of Amherst College and Harvard Law School, Houston played a significant role in dismantling Jim Crow laws, especially combating segregation in schools and racial housing covenants. He earned the title "The Man Who Killed Jim Crow".

Houston is also well known for having trained and mentored a generation of black attorneys, including Thurgood Marshall, future founder and director of the NAACP Legal Defense Fund and the first Black Supreme Court Justice. He recruited young lawyers to work on the NAACP's litigation campaigns, building connections between Howard University's and Harvard University's law schools.

== Early life ==
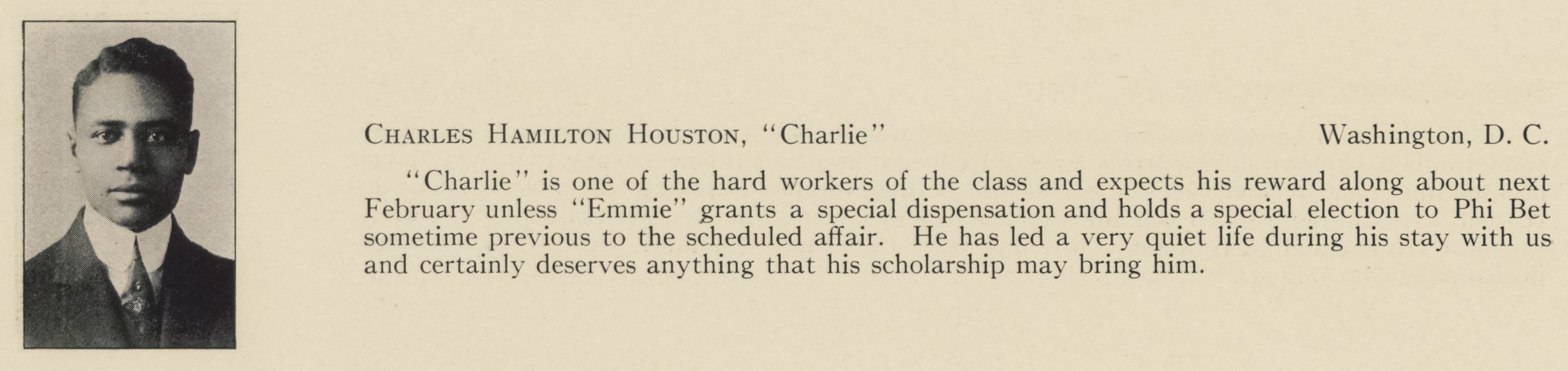
Houston in the Amherst College yearbook, 1915

Charles Hamilton Houston was born on September 3, 1895, in Washington, D.C., to a middle-class family who lived in the Strivers' section. His father, William Le Pré Houston, was the son of a former slave and had become an attorney and practiced in the capital for more than four decades. Charles' mother, Mary (born Hamilton) Houston, worked as a seamstress. Houston attended segregated local schools, entering M Street High School (now Dunbar) at the age of 12 and graduating at age 15. He studied at Amherst College beginning in 1911, was elected to the Phi Beta Kappa honor society, and graduated as valedictorian in 1915 at the age of 20, the only black student in his class. He returned to D.C. and taught English at Howard University, a historically black college.

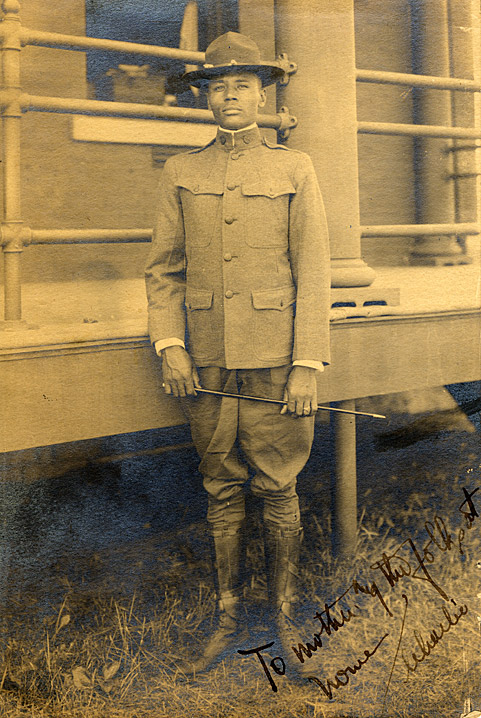
Houston as a Lieutenant during World War I

As the U.S. entered World War I, Houston joined the U.S. Army as an officer. The military was racially segregated. From 1917 to 1919, he served as a First Lieutenant in the United States Infantry, based in Fort Meade, Maryland, with service in France. After being chastised, during a brief detail as a Judge Advocate, for finding a Black sergeant not worthy of prosecution, Houston wrote later:

The hate and scorn showered on us Negro officers by our fellow Americans convinced me that there was no sense in my dying for a world ruled by them. I made up my mind that if I got through this war I would study law and use my time fighting for men who could not strike back.

After his return to the U.S. in 1919, Houston entered Harvard Law School. He was the first black student elected to the editorial board of the Harvard Law Review and graduated cum laude. Houston was also a member of Alpha Phi Alpha fraternity. He earned a bachelor's of law in 1922 and a S.J.D. from Harvard in 1923. That same year he was awarded a Sheldon Traveling Fellowship to study at the University of Madrid. After his return, he was admitted to the Washington, DC bar in 1924 and joined his father's practice.

== Career ==
When several black lawyers were refused admission to the American Bar Association in 1925, they founded the National Bar Association. Houston was a founding member of the affiliated Washington Bar Association.

Houston was recruited to the Howard University faculty by the school's first African-American president, Mordecai Johnson. From 1929 to 1935, Houston served as Vice-Dean and Dean of the Howard University School of Law. He developed the school, beginning its years as a major national center for training black lawyers. He extended its part-time program to a full-time curriculum and gained accreditation by the Association of American Law Schools and the American Bar Association. Bringing prominent attorneys to the school as speakers and to build a law network for his students, Houston served as a mentor to a generation. He influenced nearly one-quarter of all the black lawyers in the United States at the time, including former student Thurgood Marshall, who became a United States Supreme Court justice. Houston believed that the law could be used to fight racial discrimination and encouraged his students to work for that goal.

Houston left Howard in 1935 to serve as the first special counsel for the National Association for the Advancement of Colored People (NAACP), serving in this role until 1940. In this capacity, he created litigation strategies to combat racial housing covenants and segregated schools, arguing several important civil rights cases before the U.S. Supreme Court. Through his work at the NAACP, Houston played a role in nearly every civil rights case that reached the US Supreme Court between 1930 and Brown v. Board of Education (1954).

Houston worked to bring an end to the exclusion of African Americans from juries across the South. He defended African-American George Crawford on charges of murder in Loudoun County, Virginia, in 1933, and saved him from the electric chair.

In the related case of Hollins v. State of Oklahoma (1935), Houston led an all-black legal team before the US Supreme Court to appeal another murder case in which the defendant was convicted by an all-white jury and sentenced to death. The defense team had challenged the all-white jury during the trial, but the conviction was upheld by the appeals court. The Supreme Court reversed the lower court's decision and ordered a new trial. Hollins was tried a third time, again before an all-white jury, and was convicted in 1936. He was sentenced to life in prison, where he died in 1950. At the time, Oklahoma and southern states systematically excluded blacks from juries, in part because they were not on the voter rolls, having been disenfranchised across the South since the turn of the century by state barriers to voter registration. In the 21st century, attorneys continue to have to challenge prosecutorial strategies that exclude blacks from juries.

Houston's strategy on public education was to combat segregation by demonstrating the inequality resulting from the "separate but equal" doctrine dating from the Supreme Court's decision in Plessy v. Ferguson (1897). He orchestrated a campaign to force southern states and school districts to build facilities for blacks equal to those for whites, or to integrate their facilities. He focused on law schools because, at the time, mostly males attended them. He believed this would obviate the fears whites expressed that integrated schools would lead to interracial dating and marriage. In Missouri ex rel. Gaines v. Canada (1939), Houston argued that it was unconstitutional for Missouri to exclude blacks from the state's university law school when, under the "separate but equal" provision, no comparable facility for blacks existed within the state.

In the documentary "The Road to Brown", Hon. Juanita Kidd Stout described Houston's strategy related to segregated schools:

When he attacked the "separate but equal" theory his real thought behind it was that "All right, if you want it separate but equal, I will make it so expensive for it to be separate that you will have to abandon your separateness." And so that was the reason he started demanding equalization of salaries for teachers, equal facilities in the schools and all of that.

Houston founded a law firm, Houston & Gardner, with Wendell P. Gardner, Sr. It later included, as name partners, William H. Hastie, William B. Bryant, Emmet G. Sullivan, and Joseph C. Waddy, each of whom were later appointed as federal judges. The firm was prestigious but their work not well-compensated. In all, ten members of the firm advanced to become judges, including Theodore Newman and Wendell Gardner, Jr., the son of Wendell Gardner.

Houston's efforts to dismantle the legal theory of "separate but equal" were completed after his death in 1950 with the historic Brown v. Board of Education (1954) ruling, which prohibited segregation in public schools. At one point Houston had carried a movie camera as he traveled across South Carolina, in order to document the inequalities of facilities, materials and teachers' salaries between African-American and white education. As Special Counsel to the NAACP, Houston dispatched Thurgood Marshall, Oliver Hill and other young attorneys to work a litigation campaign of court challenges to equalize teachers' salaries.

Houston also directed the NAACP's campaign to end restrictive housing covenants. In the early 20th century, the organization had won a United States Supreme Court case, Buchanan v. Warley (1917), which prohibited state and local jurisdictions from establishing restrictive housing laws barring non-white individuals from owning or renting property in some areas. Real estate developers and agents responded to the decision by developing restrictive covenants and deeds to accomplish the same result by private agreement. The Court ruled in Corrigan v. Buckley (1926) that such restrictions were the acts of individuals and beyond the reach of the constitutional protections. As the NAACP continued with its campaign in the 1940s, Houston drew from contemporary sociological and other studies to demonstrate that such covenants and resulting segregation produced conditions of overcrowding, poor health, and increased crime that adversely affected African-American communities. Following Corrigan, Houston contributed to what was a 22-year campaign, in concert with lawyers he had trained, in order to overturn the constitutionality of restrictive covenants. This was achieved in the US Supreme Court ruling in Shelley v. Kraemer (1948). The court ruled that "judicial enforcement of private right constitutes state action for the purpose of the fourteenth amendment." Houston's use of sociological materials in these cases lay the groundwork for the approach and ruling in Brown v. Board of Education (1954).

== Personal life and death ==
In 1924, Houston married Gladys Moran. The two of them divorced in 1937. He next married Henrietta Williams. They had Houston's only child in 1940, Charles Hamilton Houston, Jr.

On April 22, 1950, Houston died from a heart attack at the age of 54. He is buried in Lincoln Memorial Cemetery in Suitland, Maryland.

== Legacy and honors ==
- In 1950, Houston was posthumously awarded the NAACP's Spingarn Medal.
- In 1958, the main building of the Howard University School of Law was dedicated as Charles Hamilton Houston Hall.
- The Charles Houston Bar Association and the Charles Hamilton Houston Institute for Race and Justice, established at Harvard Law School in 2005, were named for him. Elena Kagan, formerly the Dean of Harvard Law School, was also the Charles Hamilton Houston Professor of Law there; she is now an Associate Justice of the United States Supreme Court.
- The Washington Bar Association annually awards the Charles Hamilton Houston Medallion of Merit to an individual who has advanced the cause of Houstonian jurisprudence.
- In 2002, scholar Molefi Kete Asante included Charles Hamilton Houston on his list of 100 Greatest African Americans.
- In 2023, Loudoun County renamed the Loudoun County Courthouse, where Houston defended George Crawford, the "Charles Hamilton Houston Courthouse." In 2024, the National Park Service listed the courthouse as a National Historic Landmark.
