= Leesburg, Virginia =

Leesburg
- Town
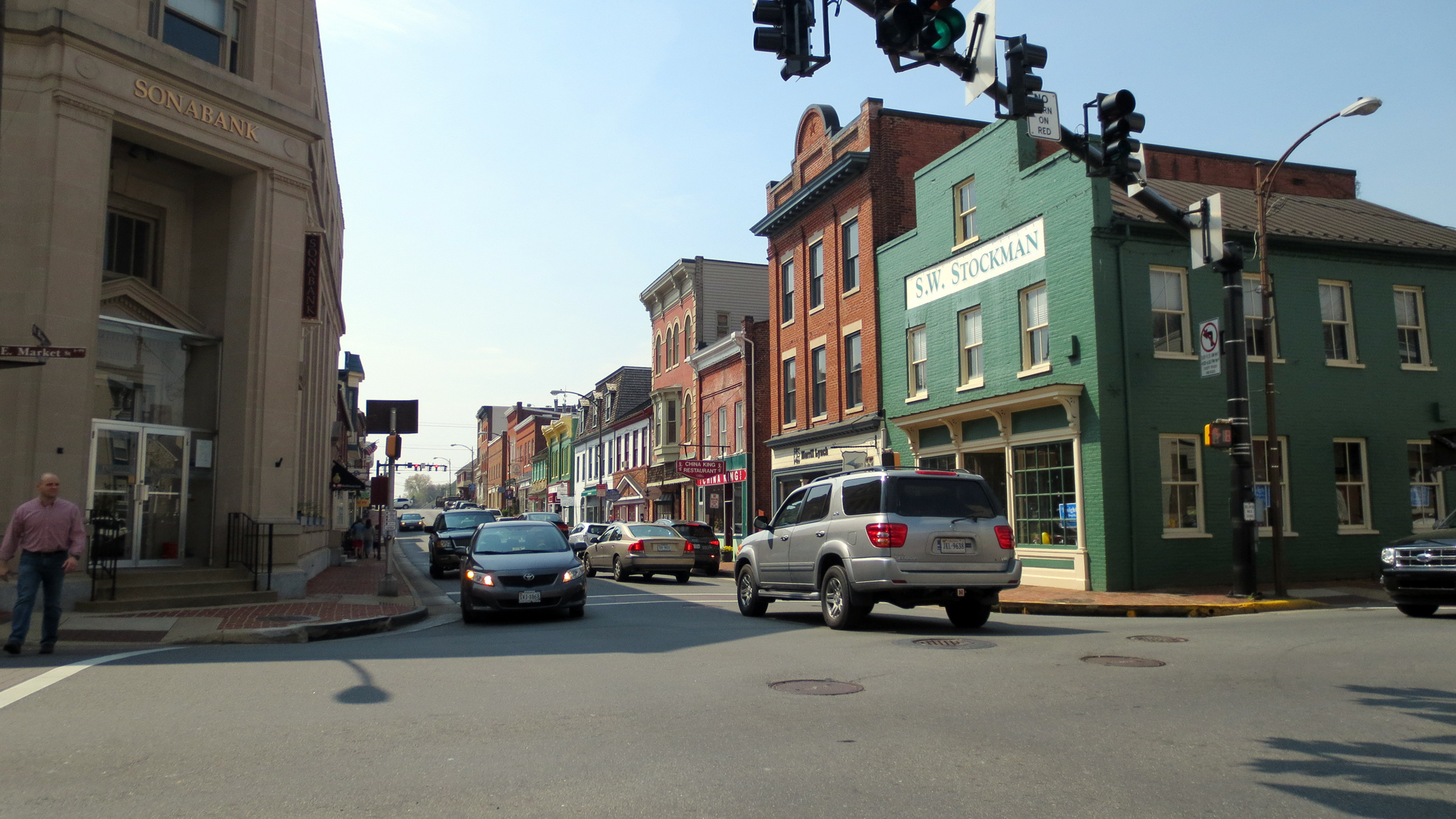
- Center of Leesburg in 2012

- Flag Seal Logo

- Location within Northern Virginia Location within Virginia Location within the United States
- Coordinates: 39°06′56″N 77°33′52″W
- Country: United States
- State: Virginia
- County: Loudoun
- Founded: October 12, 1758
- Named for: Lee family

Government
  - Type: Council–manager
  - Mayor: Kelly Burk (D)
  - Vice Mayor: Neil Steinberg (D)

Area
  - Total: 12.47 sq mi (32.29 km^{2})
  - Land: 12.40 sq mi (32.11 km^{2})
  - Water: 0.069 sq mi (0.18 km^{2})
- Elevation: 341 ft (104 m)

Population (2020)
  - Total: 48,250
  - Estimate (2021): 48,908
  - Density: 4,333.2/sq mi (1,673.07/km^{2})
- Time zone: UTC−5 (Eastern (EST))
  - Summer (DST): UTC−4 (EDT)
- ZIP Codes: 20175-20178
- Area codes: 703, 571
- FIPS code: 51-44984
- GNIS feature ID: 1498505
- Website: www.leesburgva.gov

Leesburg is a town in and the county seat of Loudoun County, Virginia, United States. It is part of both the Northern Virginia region of the state and the Washington metropolitan area, including Washington, D.C., the nation's capital.

European settlement in the area began around 1740, when it was named for the Lee family, early colonial leaders of the town. Located in the far northeast of the state, in the War of 1812 it was a refuge for important federal documents evacuated from Washington, D.C., and in the Civil War, it changed hands several times.

Leesburg is 33 miles (53 km) west-northwest of Washington, D.C., along the base of Catoctin Mountain and close to the Potomac River. The town is the northwestern terminus of the Dulles Greenway, a private toll road that connects to the Dulles Toll Road at Dulles International Airport. Its population was 48,250 as of the 2020 Census and an estimated 48,908 in 2021. It is Virginia's largest incorporated town within a county.

Like much of Loudoun County, Leesburg has undergone considerable growth and development over the last 30 years, transforming from a small, rural Piedmont town to a suburban bedroom community for commuters to the national capital. Growth in the town and its immediate area to the east (Lansdowne/Ashburn) concentrates along the Dulles Greenway and State Route 7, which roughly parallels the Potomac River between Winchester to the west and Alexandria to the east.

Leesburg is home to professional soccer team Loudoun United FC of the USL Championship division who play their home matches at Segra Field.

The Federal Aviation Administration's Washington Air Route Traffic Control Center is in Leesburg.

== Toponym ==
Leesburg may have been named to honor the influential Thomas Lee or more generally for the Lee family. The name change was passed by an Act of Assembly in 1758. Francis Lightfoot Lee and Phillip Ludwell Lee, two of Thomas' sons, were early town trustees. The town is not named, as is sometimes thought, for Robert E. Lee (Thomas' great-grandnephew).

== History ==
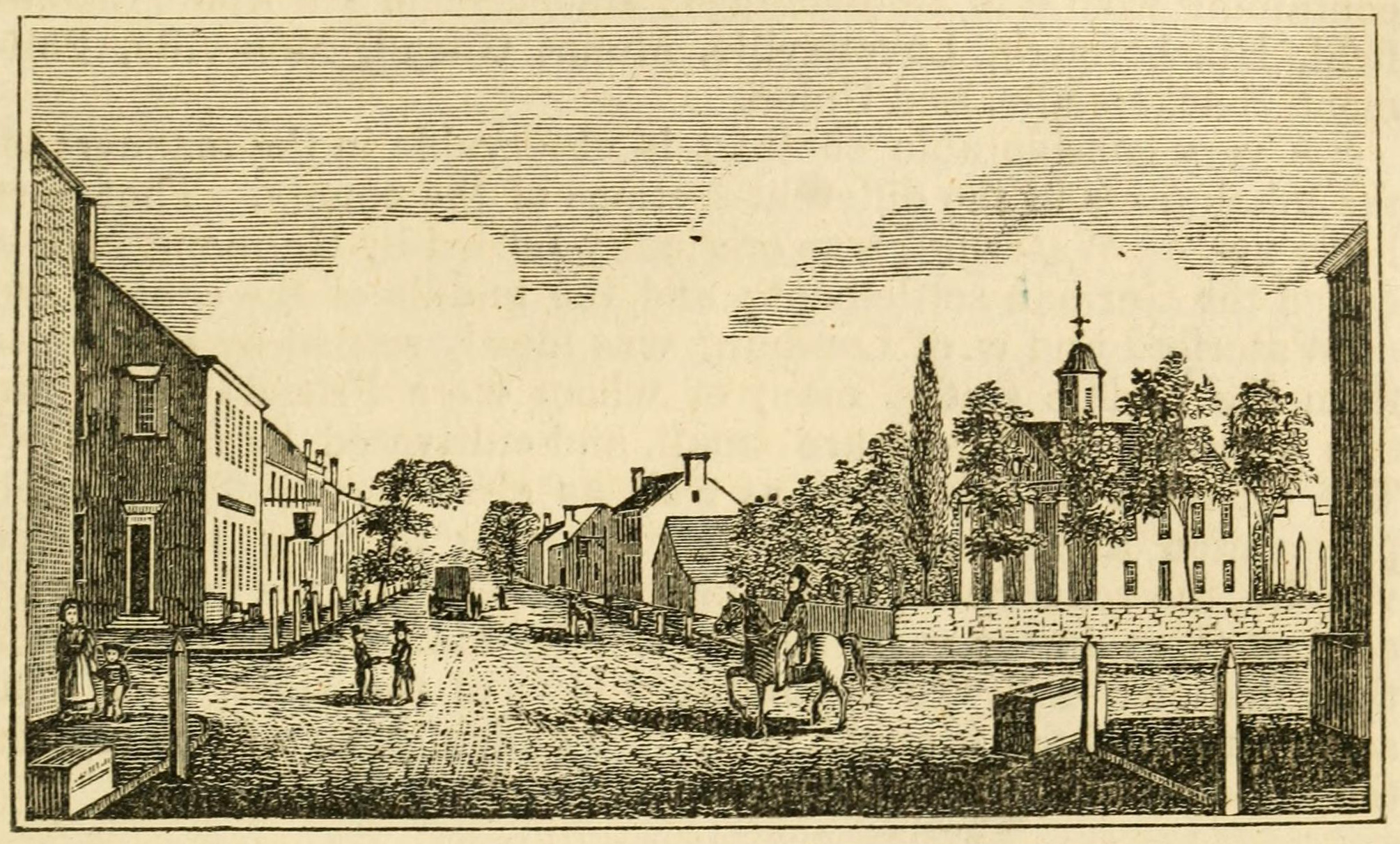
"Central View of Leesburg," c. 1845

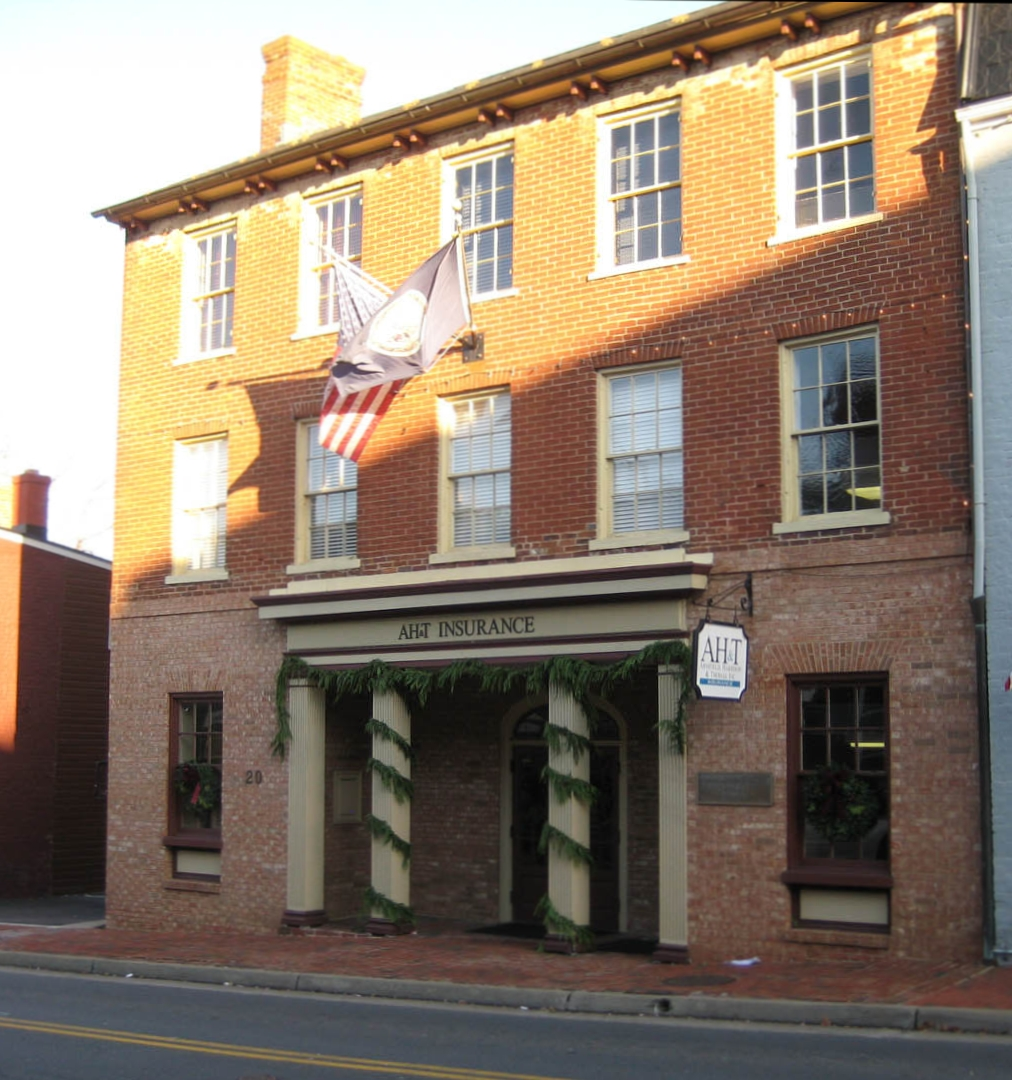
The Wheat Building

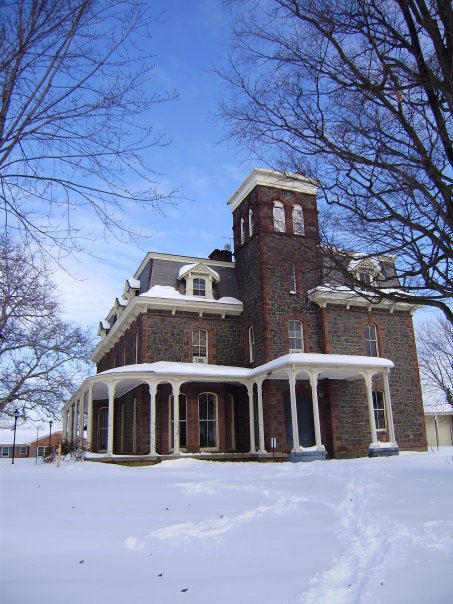
Carlheim, also known as the Paxton Mansion

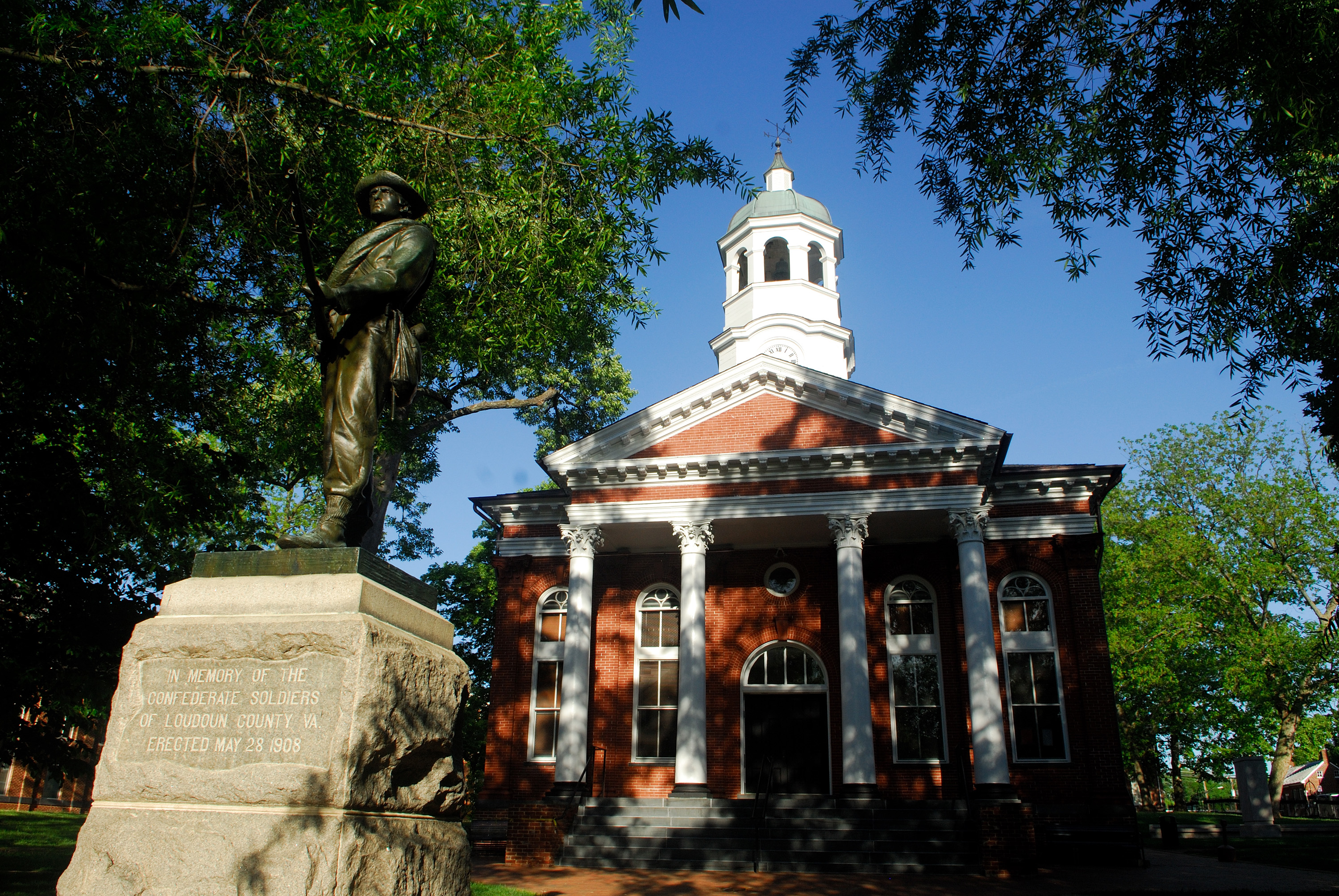
The historic Leesburg courthouse, the seat of government for Loudoun County, Virginia

Prior to European settlement, the area around Leesburg was occupied by various Native American tribes.

=== 17th century ===
In 1670, John Lederer (1670) testified that the entire Piedmont region had once been occupied by the "Tacci, alias Dogi", but that the Siouan tribes, driven from the northwest, had occupied it for 400 years.

In 1699, the Algonquian Piscataway (Conoy) moved to an island in the Potomac in the environs of Leesburg, and were there when the first known Europeans visited what is now Loudoun County.

=== 18th century ===
What later became Old Carolina Road and is present-day U.S. Route 15 was a major route of travel between north and south for Native tribes. According to local historians, a pitched battle was fought near present-day Leesburg between the warring Catawba and Lenape tribes, neither of whom lived in the area.

A war party of Lenape had traveled from their home in New Jersey and neighboring regions, all the way to South Carolina to inflict a blow on their distant enemies, the Catawba. As they were returning northward, a party of Catawbas overtook them before they reached the Potomac River, but were defeated in a pitched battle 2 miles (3 km) south of Leesburg. The surviving Lenape buried their dead in a huge burial mound, and early settlers reported that they would return to this mound to honor their dead on the anniversary of this battle for many years thereafter. The date of this conflict is unknown, but it seems the Lenape and Catawba were at war in the 1720s and 1730s.

European settlement near Leesburg began in the late 1730s as Tidewater planters moved into the area from the south and east, establishing large farms and plantations. Many of the First Families of Virginia were among those to settle in the area, including the Carters, Lees and Masons. The genesis of Leesburg occurred sometime before 1755, when Nicholas Minor acquired land around the intersection of the Old Carolina Road and the Potomac Ridge Road on present-day Route 7 and established a tavern there.

Despite lack of growth around the tavern, upon Loudoun County's formation in 1757, Minor dubbed the sparse collection of buildings about his tavern "George Town" in honor of the reigning monarch of Great Britain. The village's prosperity changed the following year when the British Colonial Council ordered the establishment of the county courthouse at the crossroads.

Minor had a town laid out on the traditional Virginia plan of six criss-cross streets. On October 12, 1758, the Virginia General Assembly founded the town of Leesburg upon the 60 acres (0.24 km^{2}) that Minor laid out. Leesburg was renamed to honor the influential Thomas Lee and not, as is popular belief, his son Francis Lightfoot Lee, who lived in Loudoun and brought up the bill to establish Leesburg. When the post office was established in Leesburg in 1803, the branch was named "Leesburgh"; the "h" persisted until 1894.

=== 19th century ===
During the War of 1812, Leesburg served as a temporary haven for the United States government and its archives, including the Declaration of Independence and the U.S. Constitution and portraits of early American leaders, including Benjamin Franklin, when it was forced to flee Washington in the face of the British Army. When reconstruction began on the United States Capitol, Potomac marble from quarries just south of Leesburg was used.

Early in the American Civil War, Leesburg was the site of the Battle of Ball's Bluff, a small but significant Confederate victory. The battlefield, along the Potomac River 2 miles (3 km) northeast of the town center, is marked by one of America's smallest national cemeteries. The town frequently changed hands over the course of the war as both armies traversed the area during the Maryland and Gettysburg campaigns.

The Battle of Mile Hill was fought just north of the town prior to its occupation by Robert E. Lee in September 1862. Leesburg also served as a base of operations for Col. John S. Mosby and his partisan Raiders. The Loudoun County Courthouse is among the few courthouses in Virginia that was not burned during the Civil War; the present one was built in 1894.

In 1889, a 14-year-old black American, Orion Anderson, was killed by a white mob at the town's freight depot; his murder would be the second of three recorded lynchings in Loudoun County, Virginia, between 1880 and 1902.

=== 20th century ===
In the 20th century, Leesburg was the home of World War II General George C. Marshall, architect of the famous Marshall Plan that helped re-build Europe after the war, and radio personality Arthur Godfrey, who donated land for the town's first airport.

Leesburg continued to serve as the center of government and commerce for Loudoun County. The town's historic district was placed on the National Register of Historic Places in 1970 and cited as one of the best preserved and most picturesque downtowns in Virginia.

=== 21st century ===
In the 21st century, Downtown merchants have recently labeled themselves "Loudoun's Original Town Center", largely in response to the growing number of mixed-use shopping areas in proximity. Leesburg has served Loudoun's county seat continuously since the county's formation in 1757.

=== Historic sites ===
The Leesburg area contains twenty-one entries on the National Register of Historic Places, including:

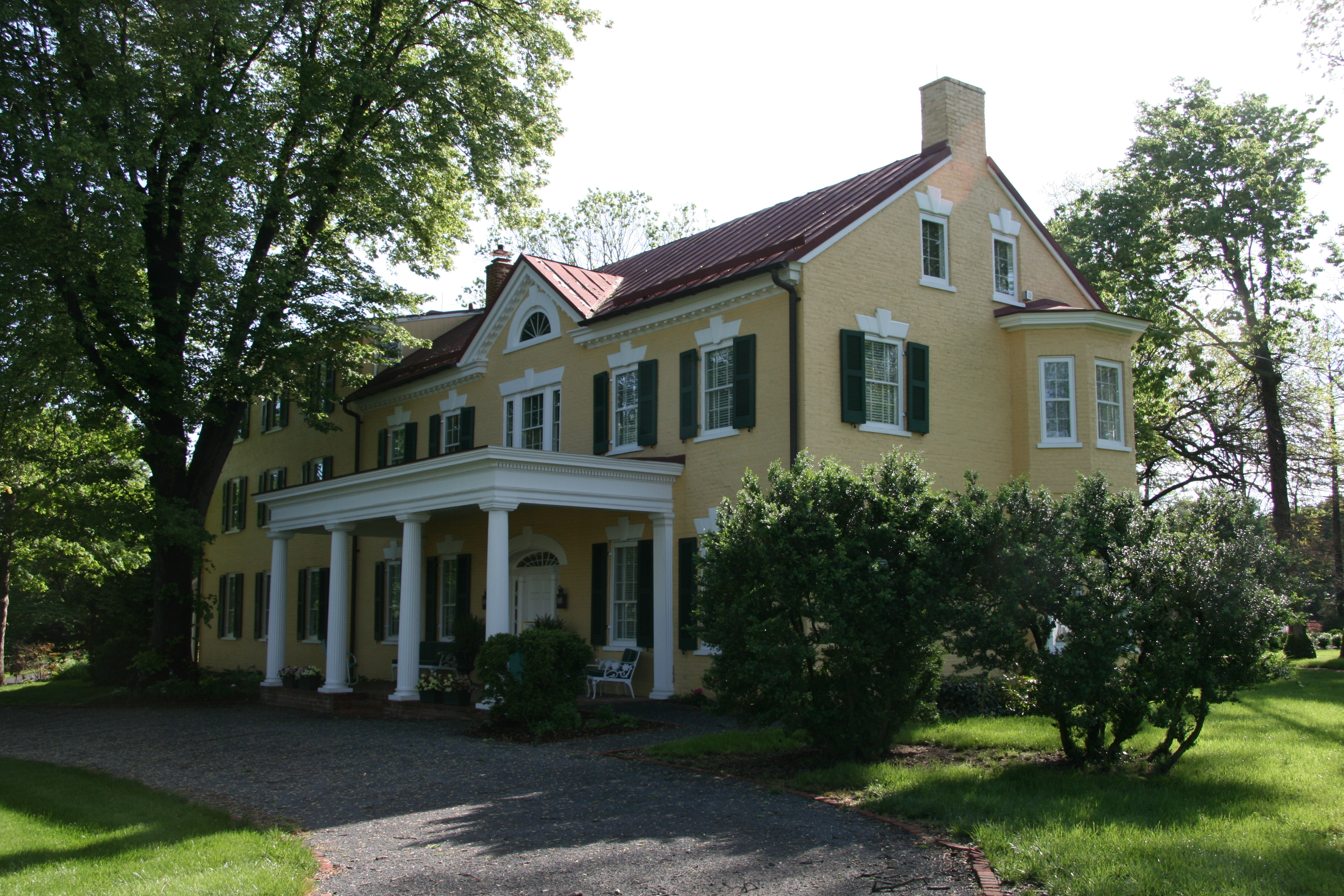
- George C. Marshall's Dodona Manor is open to the public as a museum.
  Dodona Manor, the restored early-19th-century home of George C. Marshall, a general and diplomat who received the Nobel Peace Prize and owned the home from 1941 until his death in 1959.
- Exeter Plantation, delisted after it burned down.
- Glenfiddich House, a former Civil War–era hospital where Robert E. Lee planned the invasion of Maryland.
- Morven Park, the estate of Virginia Governor Westmoreland Davis.
- Oatlands Historic House & Gardens, a National Historic Landmark and former home of George Carter and William Corcoran Eustis.
- White's Ferry, before closing in December 2020 was the only remaining ferry across the Potomac River, with its Virginia terminus 4 miles (6 km) northeast of town. It was a cable-guided car and passenger ferry. A ferry had plied the river from this site since 1828. According to WTOP, a Loudoun County businessman purchased White's Ferry in February 2021 with the express purpose of reviving the historic Potomac River crossing.

At least sixty-three historic markers are located in and near Leesburg.

== Geography ==
Leesburg is located northeast of the center of Loudoun County, Virginia, at 39°6′56″N 77°33′52″W (39.1155, −77.5644), It is part of the northern Virginia Piedmont and sits at the base of the easternmost chain of the Blue Ridge Mountains, Catoctin Mountain. The town lies in the Culpeper Basin (an inland sea during the Jurassic period) and is adjacent to the valley of the Potomac River, so that the local relief is less pronounced than in other Virginia Piedmont towns. Elevation in town ranges from about 350 to 400 feet (110 to 120 m), with the ridge of Catoctin Mountain rising to 670 feet (200 m) just west of the town limits. The Town Branch of Tuscarora Creek passes through the center of town, flowing east to Goose Creek, a tributary of the Potomac.

According to the United States Census Bureau, the town has a total area of 12.4 square miles (32 km^{2}), of which 0.06 square miles (0.16 km^{2}), or 0.54%, are water.

== Demographics ==
Historical population
Census	Pop.	Note	%±
1850	1,691		—
1860	1,130		−33.2%
1870	1,144		1.2%
1880	1,726		50.9%
1890	1,650		−4.4%
1900	1,513		−8.3%
1910	1,597		5.6%
1920	1,545		−3.3%
1930	1,640		6.1%
1940	1,698		3.5%
1950	1,703		0.3%
1960	2,869		68.5%
1970	4,821		68.0%
1980	8,357		73.3%
1990	16,202		93.9%
2000	28,311		74.7%
2010	42,616		50.5%
2020	48,250		13.2%

=== 2020 census ===
As of the 2020 census, Leesburg had a population of 48,250. The median age was 35.6 years. 26.8% of residents were under the age of 18 and 9.4% of residents were 65 years of age or older. For every 100 females there were 95.5 males, and for every 100 females age 18 and over there were 92.6 males age 18 and over.

99.6% of residents lived in urban areas, while 0.4% lived in rural areas.

There were 16,184 households in Leesburg, of which 42.4% had children under the age of 18 living in them. Of all households, 57.7% were married-couple households, 14.8% were households with a male householder and no spouse or partner present, and 21.9% were households with a female householder and no spouse or partner present. About 20.5% of all households were made up of individuals and 5.6% had someone living alone who was 65 years of age or older.

There were 16,699 housing units, of which 3.1% were vacant. The homeowner vacancy rate was 0.6% and the rental vacancy rate was 4.8%.

Racial composition as of the 2020 census
Race	Number	Percent
White	27,990	58.0%
Black or African American	4,055	8.4%
American Indian and Alaska Native	228	0.5%
Asian	4,270	8.8%
Native Hawaiian and Other Pacific Islander	31	0.1%
Some other race	6,282	13.0%
Two or more races	5,394	11.2%
Hispanic or Latino (of any race)	10,654	22.1%

=== 2010 census ===
According to the 2010 census, there were 42,616 people including 14,441 households, and 10,522 families residing in the town. The population density was 3,673 inhabitants per square mile (1,418/km^{2}). There were 15,119 housing units at an average density of 1,220.2 per square mile (471.1/km^{2}). The racial makeup of the town was 71.1% White, 9.5% African American, 0.4% Native American, 7.1% Asian, 0.0% Pacific Islander, 7.5% from other races, and 4.3% from two or more races. Hispanic or Latino of any race were 17.4% of the population.

Of all households, 44.4% had children under the age of 18 living with them, 57.8% were married couples living together, 10.5% had a female householder with no husband present, and 27.1% were non-families. 21.1% were made up of individuals, and 4.9% had someone living alone who was 65 years of age or older. The average household size was 2.93 and the average family size was 3.42.

By age, the population was 30.7% under the age of 18, 5.5% from 18 to 24, 32.9% from 25 to 44, 23.4% from 45 to 64, and 6.1% who were 65 years of age or older. The median age was 33.3 years. For every 100 females, there were 95.7 males. For every 100 females aged 18 and over, there were 93.6 males.

=== Income and poverty ===
The median income of the households in the town was $68,861, and the median income of the families was $78,111 (these figures had risen to $87,346 and $105,260 respectively as of a 2007 estimate). Males had a median income of $51,267 versus $35,717 for females. The per capita income for the town was $30,116. About 2.4% of families and 3.6% of the population were below the poverty line, including 3.8% of those under age 18 and 8.2% of those age 65 or over.

== Education ==
Leesburg has four public high schools operated by Loudoun County Public Schools: Loudoun County High School, Heritage High School, Tuscarora High School, and Riverside High School.

Leesburg is also served by several private schools, including Providence Academy, a K–8 non-denominational Christian school; Evergreen Christian School, a 9–12 non-denominational Christian school; and pre-K-8 Loudoun Country Day School.

== Public services ==
The Leesburg Volunteer Fire Company provides fire protection services. The Loudoun County Volunteer Rescue Squad provides rescue and emergency medical services. Both the fire company and rescue squad are volunteer organizations supplemented with partial staffing from the Loudoun County Department of Fire, Rescue and Emergency Management. The fire company can trace its roots back to 1803; the rescue squad was formed in 1952.

Leesburg is served by a town police department. The Leesburg Police Department (LPD) has an authorized strength of 90 sworn officers and provides 24/7 patrol service to the town, as well as handling criminal investigations, traffic control, and special operations within the town. The department is completely separate from the Loudoun County Sheriff's Office, which is Loudoun County's primary law enforcement agency and provides security for the courthouse in Leesburg. The LPD was formed in 1758.

== Media ==
The Loudoun Times-Mirror is a Leesburg-based weekly newspaper serving Loudoun County, and the local radio station is WNDC. Leesburg is assigned to the Washington, D.C. media market, and is covered by its major television and radio stations; broadcasters from Baltimore, Frederick, and Winchester are also readily available.

== Transportation ==
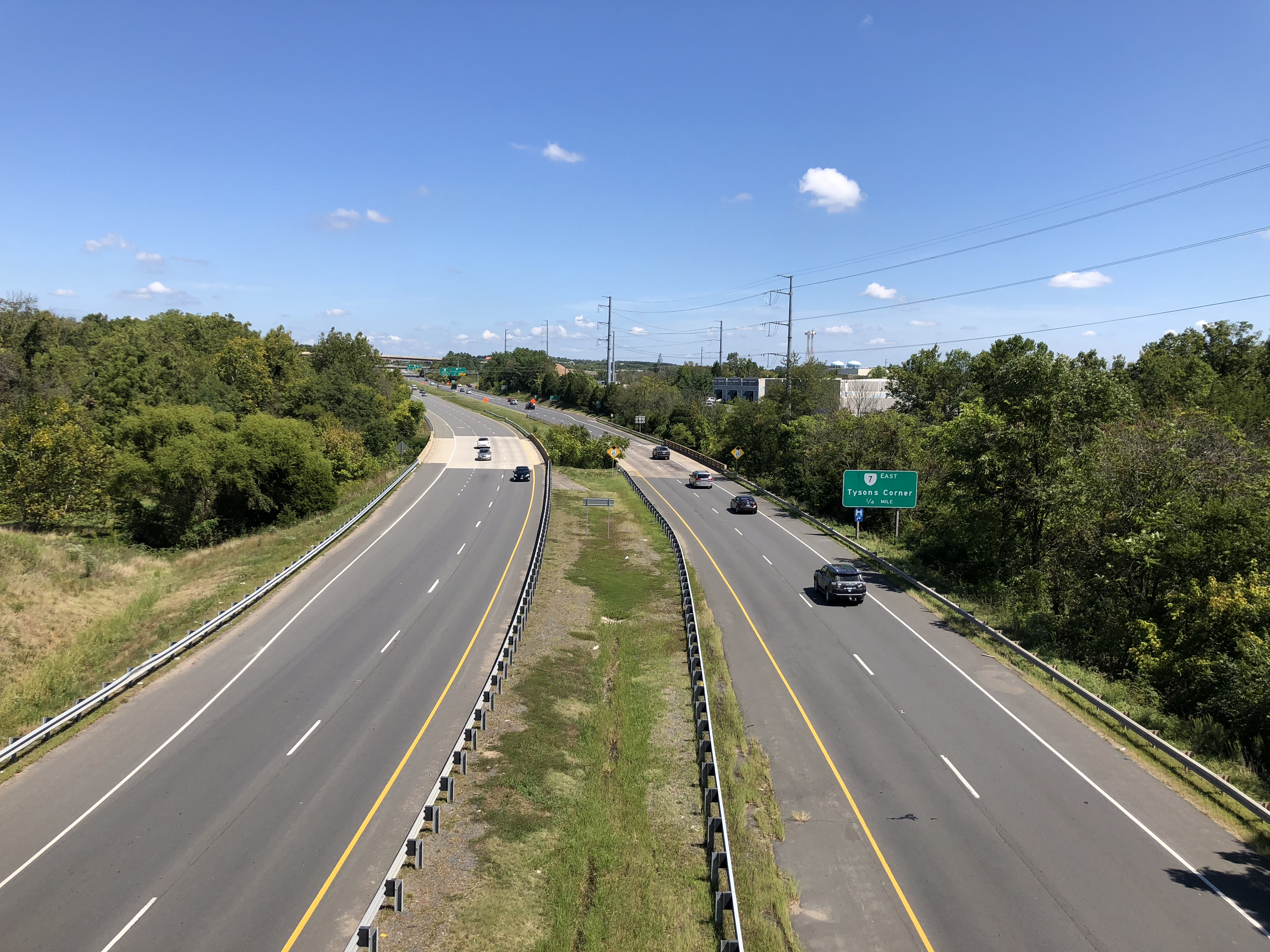
View north along US 15 and east along SR 7 on the Leesburg Bypass

The primary highways serving Leesburg include U.S. Route 15, Virginia State Route 7 and Virginia State Route 267.

US 15 enters Leesburg from the southwest, following King Street, then joins the Leesburg Bypass to pass southeast of downtown. It rejoins King Street as it leaves the bypass on the northeast end of town on its way toward Maryland. The old alignment of US 15 is now U.S. Route 15 Business. Via US 15, travelers can reach Warrenton 34 miles (55 km) to the southwest and Frederick, Maryland, 25 miles (40 km) to the northeast.

SR 7 enters Leesburg from the west along Market Street and immediately joins the Leesburg Bypass to pass southwest of downtown. It rejoins Market Street as it leaves the bypass southeast of downtown. The old alignment of SR 7 is now Virginia State Route 7 Business. SR 7 37 miles (60 km) west to Winchester and 35 miles (56 km) southeast to Alexandria.

SR 267 enters Leesburg from the south along the Dulles Greenway and terminates at the Leesburg Bypass (US 15 and SR 7). SR 267 functions as a high-speed bypass of SR 7 southeast of Leesburg but is also a toll road.

Loudoun County Transit provides public transportation services in Leesburg, including commuter routes to Washington, D.C. and a connector to Purcellville.

The Washington and Old Dominion Railroad previously provided rail service to Leesburg. The Washington and Old Dominion Railroad Regional Park, a rail trail, now runs on the line.

== Business and industry ==
Leesburg operates the Leesburg Executive Airport at Godfrey Field, which serves Loudoun County with private and corporate aircraft operations. A designated reliever airport for Dulles International, the airport accounts for nearly $78 million per year in economic impact according to a 2011 study by the Virginia Department of Aviation. It is home (as of 2005) to over 240 aircraft and hosts 20–30 jet operations per day. The airport was built in 1963 to replace the original Leesburg airport, which Arthur Godfrey owned and referred to affectionately as "The Old Cow Pasture" on his radio show. Godfrey, who, by the early 1950s, had purchased the Beacon Hill Estate west of Leesburg, used a DC-3 to commute from his farm to studios in New York City every Sunday night during the 1950s and 1960s. His DC-3 was so powerful and noisy that Godfrey built a new airport, funding it through the sale of the old field. Originally named Godfrey Field, it is now known as Leesburg Executive Airport at Godfrey Field.

Also located near Leesburg is the National Conference Center, which the Xerox Corporation built in the 1970s. Government entities and private business use the Conference Center for meetings and conferences. Three main focal points connect this maze of underground buildings, one of which is currently the headquarters of Civilian Police International, a government sub-contract company.

Market Station, located in the southeastern portion of Leesburg's Historic District, contains a number of high-tech and legal offices, retail shops, and restaurants that are housed within seven restored historic buildings (a railroad freight station, a railroad stationmaster's house, a log house, two barns and two gristmills), some of which were reconstructed in or relocated to the site. A plaza on the east side of the site contains several structures painted in the yellow and green colors of the stations of the Washington and Old Dominion Railroad, which served the town until 1968.

Iridium Communications Inc. (formerly Iridium Satellite LLC) system of satellites is "guided from the basement of a featureless two-story office building" located in Leesburg.

=== Top employers ===
According to Leesburg's FY 2022 Annual Comprehensive Financial Report, the top employers in the town are:

#	Employer	# of Employees
1	Loudoun County Government	2,500–5,000
2	Loudoun County Public Schools	1,000–1,500
3	Federal Aviation Administration	500–1,000
4	Town of Leesburg	250–500
5	Wegmans	250–500
6	Commonwealth of Virginia	250–500
7	Target	250–500
8	Stryker Corporation	250–500
9	Costco	250–500
10	Loudoun Medical Group	100–250

== Recreational facilities and events ==
=== Parks ===
- Ida Lee Park - Located near the north side of Leesburg, Ida Lee Park was made possible in 1986 by the donation of Greenwood Farm to the Town of Leesburg by William F. Rust Jr. and his wife, Margaret Dole Rust. The farm contained 141 acres (57 ha) and was donated to the town for perpetual use as the Ida Lee Park. The Rusts requested that the park be named in memory of Ida Lee, Mr. Rust's grandmother, to preserve the historic link between the Lee family of Virginia and the Town of Leesburg. Ida Lee Rust was the daughter of Edmund Jennings Lee, first cousin of Robert E. Lee. Ida Lee spent her married life at "Rockland," the Rust family home located near Leesburg, and in her later years lived in a house built by her sons at 113 East Cornwall Street in Leesburg. The Rusts also donated 3 acres (12,000 m^{2}) of land from the original 141 acres (57 ha) for the Rust Library located adjacent to Ida Lee Park. In 1991, the Rusts gave the town $50,000 for the construction of the William J. Cox Pavilion at Ida Lee Park, a public picnic area containing a pavilion and playground.
- Morven Park - A 1,000-acre (400 ha) historic estate and horse park. Located on the grounds are the Morven Park Mansion, the Winmill Carriage Museum, formal boxwood gardens, miles of hiking and riding trails, and athletic fields. The park is also home to the Museum of Hounds and Hunting of North America with displays of art, artifacts and memorabilia about the sport of foxhunting.
- Washington & Old Dominion Railroad Trail - Hikers, bikers and joggers can travel in and through Leesburg on the trail, a 45-mile-long (72 km) rail trail that the Northern Virginia Regional Park Authority constructed on the historic W&OD RR's right-of-way.
- Red Rocks Wilderness Overlook Regional Park - Located east of Leesburg along the banks of the Potomac River, the park, operated by the NVRPA, contains 67 acres (27 ha) of woodlands and over 2 miles (3.2 km) of trails leading to bluffs along the river. Frances Speek donated the land to NVRPA in 1978. The ruins in the park date to 1869. They were part of the estate of industrialist Charles R. Paxton, who is best known in Leesburg for building the Victorian mansion Carlheim.
- The Rust Manor House and Nature Sanctuary - Located near the west side of Leesburg at the foot of Catoctin Mountain, the sanctuary contains a mansion and a nature reserve that the Audubon Naturalist Society of the Central Atlantic States, Inc., owns and operates.

=== Events ===
- Leesburg's Flower and Garden Festival - Held annually in April in the Historic District, the event includes garden displays, vendors and entertainment.
- Fourth of July Celebration - Events include a morning parade, a festival at Ida Lee Park and evening fireworks.
- Classic Car Show - is held annually on the first Saturday in June. This event features dozens of classic cars and hot rods on display in the streets of downtown Leesburg as well as music and food. Proceeds benefit the Graphic Arts and Auto Body programs at C.S. Monroe Technology Center.
- Leesburg AirShow - is held annually on the last Saturday in September. This event features parachute jumpers, aerobatic routines, warbirds, model aircraft, military vehicles & classic cars on display on the ramp of the airport, as well as music and food.
- Halloween Parade - Said to be one of the longest-running Halloween parades in the country, the parade includes marching bands from the local high schools, floats made by local businesses, Scout troops and families, etc. Many participants distribute candy to parade watchers.
- Santa rides - Since 1988, members of the Leesburg Volunteer Fire Company have decorated a piece of fire apparatus with Christmas lights with Santa, Rudolf, and Frosty riding on top of said fire apparatus waving to the people of the Town of Leesburg; it is estimated this event reaches around 30,000 people every year.

== Notable people ==
- Jonathan Allen, professional football player for the Washington Football Team, raised in Leesburg; went to high school at nearby Stone Bridge High School in Ashburn.
- Russell Baker, author.
- Thomas Balch, historian born in Leesburg.
- Joe Bauserman, former minor league baseball and college football player, who briefly played for the Ohio State Buckeyes, born in Leesburg.
- Calle Brown, soccer player
- Westmoreland Davis, 48th governor of Virginia.
- James Dickey, author, wrote his novel Deliverance while living in Glenfiddich House from 1966 to 1968.
- Adam Fuhrmann, U.S. Air Force Major and NASA Astronaut
- Arthur Godfrey, entertainer, lived in Leesburg. The municipal airport, Godfrey Field, is named after him.
- Mark Herring, Attorney General of Virginia.
- Fred Hetzel, former professional basketball player.
- Billy Hurley III, PGA Tour golfer.
- Lyndon LaRouche, political activist; lived near Leesburg from 1983 until his imprisonment in 1989.
- George C. Marshall, American Chief of Staff and five-star general during World War II, Secretary of State, and chief architect of the Marshall Plan; lived at Dodona Manor.
- Roland Martin, journalist and commentator.
- Stevens T. Mason, politician and first governor of Michigan.
- Lewis Nixon, U.S. naval architect and once leader of Tammany Hall; born in Leesburg.
- Joseph B. Payne (died 1968), member of the Maryland House of Delegates
- Jeremy Roach, basketball player for the Duke Blue Devils.
- Clara Schwartz, convicted murderer.
- Mohamad Anas Haitham Soueid (also known as Alex Soueid and Anas Alswaid), Syrian-born naturalized United States citizen indicted on espionage-related charges by federal prosecutors in October 2011.
- Tiffany Taylor, Playmate of the Month for November 1998.
- John Tolbert, Jr., local education activist and politician.
- Will Toledo, lead singer, songwriter, and musician of the indie rock band Car Seat Headrest; born and raised in Leesburg.
- Jennifer Wexton (born 1968), former U.S. representative Virginia state senator and prosecutor
- Joseph Winters (1816–1916), African-American abolitionist.
- The character Supergirl was born in Leesburg.
