= Marguerite Inman Davis =

First Lady of Virginia

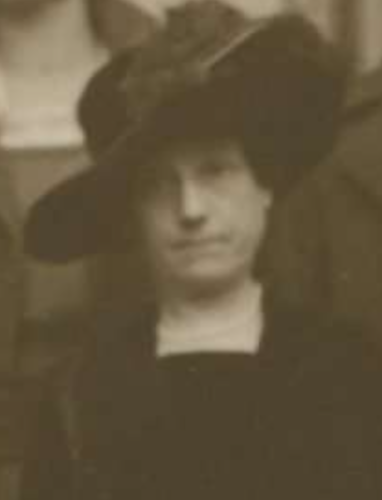
- Photograph of Davis circa 1919

First Lady of Virginia
- In role February 1, 1918 – February 1, 1922
- Preceded by: Margaret Bruce Carter Stuart
- Succeeded by: Helen Ball Sexton Trinkle

Personal details
- Born: Marguerite Grace Inman; 1870 Augusta, Georgia, U.S.
- Died: July 15, 1963 (aged 92–93) Branford, Connecticut, U.S.
- Resting place: Morven Park
- Spouse: Westmoreland Davis
- Occupation: Nurse, socialite

Marguerite Grace Davis (née Inman; 1870 – July 15, 1963) was an American socialite, nurse and political figure. She was the First Lady of Virginia from 1918 to 1922 as the wife of Westmoreland Davis. Her time in the role was during the Spanish flu outbreak and the end of World War I, which both shaped her public life.

== Early life and family ==
Marguerite Grace Inman was born in 1870 in Augusta, Georgia and grew up in Brooklyn and later Manhattan, New York during the height of the Gilded Age. She was born into a wealthy family, as her father William H. Inman was a New York cotton broker and shipping magnate from the American South. Her mother Frances J. Curry, was a niece of Jabez L. M. Curry, United States Minister to Spain under President Grover Cleveland. Her first cousin was John H. Inman.

As a young woman, she was immersed in the society of Georgia and New York and studied music in Bonn and Paris.

On August 7, 1892, she married Westmoreland Davis at St. Margaret's, Westminster in London. They did not have any children.

== Public life ==
=== Socialite ===
Davis was well known as a hostess and for her various world travels, particularly throughout Europe and Asia. She was an avid equestrian and gardener, and in 1902, she was featured in the New York Times in a trim riding habit, mounted on a Godolphin. She was also featured on the cover of Rider and Driver equestrian magazine, and was an active member of the Orange County Hunt Club in Virginia.

In 1903, Davis and her husband purchased the 1,500 acre Morven Park estate. The estate became an agricultural showpiece, and Davis developed formal boxwood gardens near the house.

Davis was an avid collector of art, sculpture, and antiques, including furnishings once belonging to Louis XIV and Napoleon III, 16th-century Flemish tapestries, and artworks by Edward Gay and M. DeForest Bolmer.

=== First lady ===
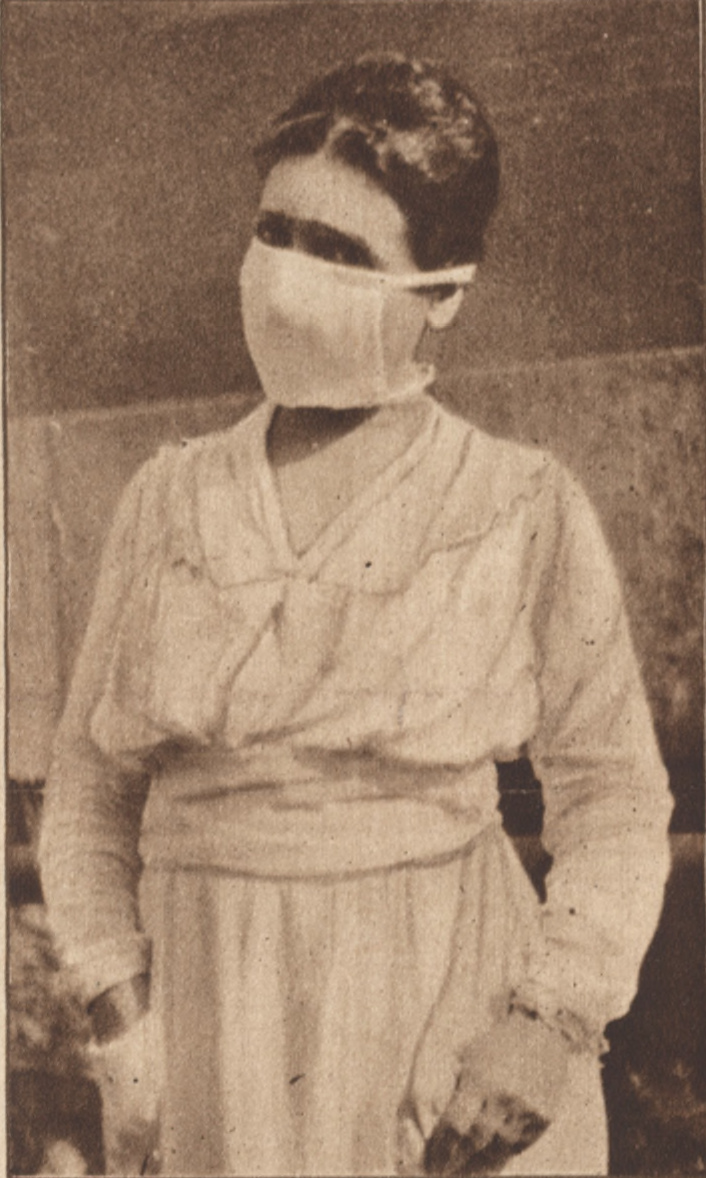
Davis as a nurse during the Spanish Flu epidemic in Richmond, circa 1918

Davis became First Lady of Virginia in 1918. Despite wartime rationing, the Richmond News Leader described the inaugural reception as the most fashionable social event of Virginia's social season. She served as president of the Women's Munition Reserve, the only American organization during the war to provide female labor for munition production. She also played an active role in helping to mitigate the war labor shortage that affected Virginia, and her leading by example encouraged other women to become involved in the war effort.

During the Spanish flu epidemic which impacted Virginia between 1918 and 1919, Davis volunteered with the Red Cross as a nurse in the pneumonia ward of the John Marshall Emergency Hospital (located at the original site of John Marshall High School). Her efforts were featured in The New York Times and Portsmouth Daily Times. She also chaired a committee to distribute tobacco to men in the hospital at Camp Lee during this period. Davis was applauded for her "racial liberalism" during the epidemic, when she provided care to both black and white patients without distinction.

According to the Library of Virginia, "Davis set an example for the commonwealth’s working women by driving her own car, wearing practical uniforms with pants called “womanalls,” volunteering as a nurse during the influenza epidemic, and entertaining enlisted men at Camp Lee."

In November 1918, the African American parishioners of Ebenezer Baptist Church held a special service in honor of Davis for her service to the state. The same month, Davis was a guest of honor at the film premiere of D. W. Griffith's Heart of the World. After the Armistice of 11 November 1918, Davis hung a peace banner over the front door of the Executive Mansion - a replica of the American flag and the world "peace" superimposed.

Davis was an active hostess of various activities at the Executive Mansion, including entertaining women's suffrage groups. She also established scholarship programs for Virginia students. In 1919, Davis took part in a ceremony with the Chickahominy people to honor the treaty that ended the Third Anglo-Powhatan War. Davis donated twenty-five magnolia trees to be planted in Capitol Square in Richmond, and oversaw and overall landscaping project at the capitol.

In September 1920, Davis received several delegates to the Suffrage Convention as guests at the Executive Mansion, including Lila Valentine. The same month, she opened the Executive Mansion for a formal reception for members of the Equal Suffrage League of Virginia.

A democracy is dependent upon a belief in the people, and childhood is a time of faith and trust. A democracy is dependent upon an educated constituency, and childhood is the time of education. Self control, faith, education, these three are the foundation form of government.

— Marguerite Inman Davis, Speech to the Federation of Mother's Clubs, Richmond Times-Dispatch

In 1921, Davis received honorary membership in the Virginia Federation of Business and Professional Women's Clubs and accepted the position of Honorary Vice President of the Virginia Historical Pageant Association. She was also a member of the Association for the Preservation of Virginia Antiquities, Daughters of the American Revolution, and the United Daughters of the Confederacy.

In 1921, Davis was the formal host of a state visit by former allied commander-in-chief Ferdinand Foch.

=== Later life ===
After her husband's governorship, Davis remained as a prominent hostess and society figure in Virginia. In 1928, the College of William & Mary commissioned a portrait of the first lady for the college's collection. Her portrait hangs in the Botetourt Gallery in Swem Library.

In 1940, Davis and her husband were on the front cover of Southern Planter magazine. After her husband's death in 1943, she invested a large part of her husband's estate in war bonds, established the Westmoreland Davis Memorial Foundation, and supported the American war cause by donating two ambulances and three of her pedigreed Dobermanns into the army K-9 corps to be trained as war dogs.

Throughout her later years, Davis remained vocal about her views of the state of Virginia politics, and the Byrd machine in particular. In 1955, she worked to make Morven Park an endowed cultural center, museum, and equestrian park open to the public.

== Death and legacy ==
Davis died on July 15, 1963, in Branford, Connecticut, and is buried at the Morven Park estate in Leesburg, Virginia.

Davis is credited with establishing the charitable foundation which now owns and operates Morven Park today.

Davis is the subject of a 1970 biography titled Marguerite Inman Davis: First Progressive First Lady of Virginia by Sally Briggs McCarthy of Virginia Tech. She is also the subject of the 1998 biography by Carolyn Green.
