= Soueid =

Soueid is a transliteration of various Arabic language surnames. It is most common in this form in Lebanon and Syria. It can refer to:

- Dr. Fares Antoun Soueid (Arabic: فارس أنطون سعيد, born 1958, Qartaba), Lebanese Christian Maronite politician
- Gregory K. Soueid, American financial services executive
- Andre Soueid, Lebanese musician
- Ahmed Ben Soueid, Libyan former footballer
- Mohamad Anas Haitham Soueid, Syrian-American convicted of espionage
- Mouhamed Soueid, Mauritanian footballer

== See also ==
- Souaid
