= Lynching of Orion Anderson =

Murder of a Virginia teenager in 1889

Coordinates: 39°06′39″N 77°33′49″W

Orion Anderson (1875 – 1889) was a 14-year-old African American who was shot and then hanged by a white mob, on November 8, 1889, in Leesburg, Virginia. His murder was the second of three recorded lynchings in Loudoun County, Virginia, between 1880 and 1902. On Juneteenth 2019, a historical marker was placed at the site of the old rail station where he was killed.

== Accusation and murder ==
=== Newspaper accounts ===
Contemporary newspaper accounts differ in details. The Richmond newspaper the Daily Times reported that on November 6, 1889, Miss Leith, described as "a school girl about seventeen years old" (some sources have her aged 14 or 15), returned home from school at the Hamilton Academy, and was "feloniously assaulted". Leith named Orion Anderson (called "Owen" by the Daily Times and some other newspapers) as her assailant, but was unable to identify him as the perpetrator. After Anderson was released, he was arrested again based on circumstantial evidence, and apparently confessed to the crime. Two days later, at one in the morning, he was taken from his jail cell by a group of a hundred armed men, who had seized the keys from Officer Charles F. Laycock. They hanged him at the freight depot and shot him as well.

A report in the Richmond Dispatch offers additional detail and differs in some aspects from the report in the Daily Times. According to the Richmond Dispatch, the girl was "assaulted by a negro boy", and ran away after she screamed and struggled. She reported that she thought it was "Owen Anderson", but had no way of knowing since he had been "disguised" with a bag on his head. After the old "guano sack" was found, he was said to have confessed, and was sent to Leesburg jail. The mob that arrived at the jail consisted of up to thirty men who were "disguised". Two of the undisguised men led another dressed up as a prisoner to the jail, and thus they fooled the jailer and made their way inside. Anderson was hanged and died in minutes and was then shot in the head, the body, and the leg. Deputy Sheriff Laycock stated that he was unable to identify the undisguised men because they were "strangers" who were not local to the county.

An article in The Washington Post published on November 9, 1889, reported that "The work was done quietly but effectually." There were no convictions related to Anderson's murder. The state of Virginia did not pass an anti-lynching law until 1928, and lynching was not recognized as a federal offense until 2022.

=== Recent research ===
An interpretive sign developed by the Northern Virginia Regional Park Authority (NOVA Parks) and the Loudoun County Chapter of the NAACP, and placed at the site of the lynching in 2019, provides a different account of what led to the accusation. Fourteen-year-old May Leith had reported that she had been scared and chased by a person with a guano sack, a cloth bag used for fertilizer, over his head. It adds that Orion was the son of Thomas and Charlotte Anderson and had nine brothers and sisters and notes that he was buried at Potter's Field, "the burial ground for the poor and unknown". In 2019, WAMU reported that recent research by the Loudoun County Freedom Center identified Anderson's actual birth year from old census records, and pointed out inaccuracies in contemporary newspaper reports. According to Michelle Thomas of the Loudoun County NAACP, Anderson's age was exaggerated in some of those reports, which vilified him by claiming he was 19 or 20 years old.

== Historical context and legacy ==
As of 2019, the murder of Orion Anderson was the second of three recorded lynchings in Loudoun County, Virginia, between 1880 and 1902. Of the 4,743 known lynchings in the United States between 1882 and 1968, reported by Tuskegee University and the NAACP, 100 occurred in Virginia; of these, 83 of the victims were African Americans.

A historical marker was put up in 2019, with descendants of both the Anderson and Leith families invited to the ceremony as part of the Loudoun County Remembrance and Reconciliation Initiative. A press report a few days before the event noted that while Anderson's relatives would attend, it was unclear whether May Leith's descendants would appear. On June 19, 2019, a group of almost 200 people gathered to march from the old jail to the site where he was lynched. Following the ceremony, soil taken from the site where Anderson was killed was sent to the National Memorial for Peace and Justice in Montgomery, Alabama.

== See also ==
- List of lynching victims in the United States
