= Souaid =

Souaid is a last name originally from Fatreh a small village in Jbeil, Lebanon. Some known people from the Souaid family are:

- Carolyn Marie Souaid (born 1959), Canadian writer
- Fares Souaid (born 1958), Lebanese politician
- Nadim Souaid (born 1986), Lebanese basketball player

== See also ==
- Soueid
