= Glenfiddich House =

Historic house in Leesburg, Virginia, U.S.

Coordinates: 39.118448°N 77.563967°W

Glenfiddich House, also known as Harrison Hall, is a historic house in Leesburg, Virginia. The house was built in three sections, with the first section completed in 1780. When viewing the house from the street, the left wing of the residence is the original home. Between 1850 and 1860, the main block of the home was built for Henry and Jane Harrison (hence Harrison Hall), by the Norris Brothers of Leesburg, and is a good example of the Italianate style of home. The property still includes historic outbuildings: a log springhouse with V-notched corners, circa 1800, and a brick meat house, circa 1855.

During the Civil War Harrison Hall became a hospitality center for Confederate officers passing through the area. After the Battle of Ball's Bluff on October 21, 1861, wounded soldiers were tended to at Harrison Hall. Among those was Colonel E. R. Burt of the 18th Mississippi. He died of his wound four days after the battle.

The most famous Civil War visitor was none other than General Robert E. Lee. The general broke one of his hands and sprained the other when his horse, Traveller, shied from a fast approaching courier. On September 4, 1862, General Lee received treatment at Harrison Hall; that evening he held a war council, planning the confederate invasion of Maryland, which ended with the Battle of Antietam. Among the planners in attendance were Generals Lewis Armistead, Thomas “Stonewall” Jackson, James Longstreet, and James Ewell Brown “Jeb” Stuart.

From 1966 to 1968 poet and author James Dickey resided at Glenfiddich House, an easy commute to his position as poetry consultant to the Library of Congress in Washington, D.C. It was during his stay that he began his manuscript for his novel Deliverance. The desk that he wrote the first drafts of the novel is still at Glenfiddich House.
