= Leesburg Executive Airport =

Airport in Virginia, United States of America

Leesburg Executive Airport Godfrey Field
- IATA: none; ICAO: KJYO; FAA LID: JYO

Summary
- Airport type: Public
- Owner: Town of Leesburg
- Serves: Leesburg, Virginia, U.S.
- Location: Loudoun County, Virginia, U.S.
- Elevation AMSL: 389 ft / 119 m
- Coordinates: 39°04′41″N 077°33′27″W
- Website: Official website

Map
- Location of airport in Virginia / United States JYO (the United States)

Runways
Direction	Length		Surface
Direction	ft	m	Surface
17/35	5,500	1,676	Asphalt

Statistics (2022)
- Aircraft operations: 81,873
- Based aircraft: 237
- Source: Federal Aviation Administration

Leesburg Executive Airport at Godfrey Field (ICAO: KJYO, FAA LID: JYO) is a town-owned public-use airport located three nautical miles (6 km) south of the central business district of Leesburg, a town in Loudoun County, Virginia.

It is a busy general aviation airport in the Washington metropolitan area, and a reliever for nearby Dulles International Airport.

== History ==
Leesburg Executive Airport was built in 1963 to replace an earlier grass field on the eastern edge of the town, which was owned and used by radio personality Arthur Godfrey for his private DC-3 aircraft. Godfrey sold the field and shared a portion of the funds with the Town of Leesburg, which used the proceeds to help fund a new airport 3 miles south of town. The town used matching funds from the FAA. Originally named Godfrey Field, it is now known as Leesburg Executive Airport at Godfrey Field.

In 1986, the Federal Aviation Administration (FAA) consolidated its 308 Flight Service Stations into 61 'automated' stations (to be known as "AFSS"). The Flight Service Station at Leesburg was scheduled to close, but local lobbying convinced the FAA to rent space from the town and locate an AFSS at the airport. In 1993, when the airport fixed-base operator went bankrupt, the Town of Leesburg assumed direct operation of airport services, lengthening the runway twice to an eventual length of 5,500 feet (1,700 m) to support business jets and adding a localizer approach and automated weather observation equipment to support all-weather operations.

The airport is currently a designated general aviation reliever airport for Dulles International, 10 miles (16 kilometers) to the southeast, and in 2008 hosted 231 aircraft based on the field and an average of 265 aircraft operations per day. The FAA funded an ILS installation that was completed in April 2011. The field also has a GNSS RNAV approach to runway 17 with vertical guidance available. A VOR-A approach was removed in 2010.

In 2015, Leesburg became the first airport in America to operate a remote air traffic control tower, in a test co-sponsored by the Commonwealth of Virginia and Saab-Sensis Corporation. The facility is located and operated onsite during the trial period. In February 2023 the FAA announced they were ending support for the remote control tower effective June 20, 2023. The remote tower was replaced with a mobile control tower on-site at the airport.

== Facilities and aircraft ==
Leesburg Executive Airport covers an area of 294 acres (119 ha) at an elevation of 389 feet (119 m) above mean sea level. It has one asphalt paved runway designated 17/35 which measures 5,500 by 100 feet (1,676 x 30 m).

For the 12-month period ending December 31, 2022, the airport had 81,873 aircraft operations, an average of 224 per day: 98% general aviation, <1% air taxi, <1% commercial, and <1% military. At that time there were 237 aircraft based at this airport: 195 single-engine, 21 multi-engine, 17 jet, 3 helicopter, and 1 glider.

== Special Flight Rules Area ==
Leesburg Executive is located on the outer boundary of the 30 nmi (56 km; 35 mi) Special Flight Rules Area (SFRA), formerly known as the Air Defense Identification Zone (ADIZ) instituted around Washington, D.C. prior to the commencement of the Iraq War in February 2003. The SFRA presents very little differences for IFR flights, but special procedures are still required for all VFR aircraft arriving at and departing from the airport. Due to a special triangular cut-out in the SFRA circle, they are less onerous than procedures for other SFRA airports.

== Management ==
The airport is owned by the Town of Leesburg, a corporate entity within the Commonwealth of Virginia. The airport is managed by an airport director who is also a Department Manager within the Town staff. An appointed commission provides oversight for policies and procedures to the Director, as well as advice and counsel to the Town Council.
