= John Tolbert =

American politician (1905–1999)

John W. Tolbert, Jr. (Charlestown, West Virginia, 12 July 1905 – 1999) was an American local education activist and local politician from Leesburg, Virginia.

He was born in Charlestown, West Virginia, on July 12, 1905, to John W. Tolbert, Sr., and Sarah Dabney Tolbert. In his youth he attended Dunbar High School (Washington, D.C.).

He was the first black person to serve on the Leesburg Town Council, for 14 years from 1976 to 1990, and never missed a meeting. Tolbert was appointed to the Town Council in 1976 and was first elected in 1978, losing reelection in 1990. Active in public life, he gave his time and energy to numerous organizations and committees, receiving a number of awards for his achievements.

John W. Tolbert Jr. Elementary School, Tolbert Street, the John W. Tolbert Jr. Bridge, and the Tolbert Building, all in Leesburg, are named in his honor.
