= Morven Park =

Historic house in Virginia, United States

- U.S. National Register of Historic Places
- Virginia Landmarks Register
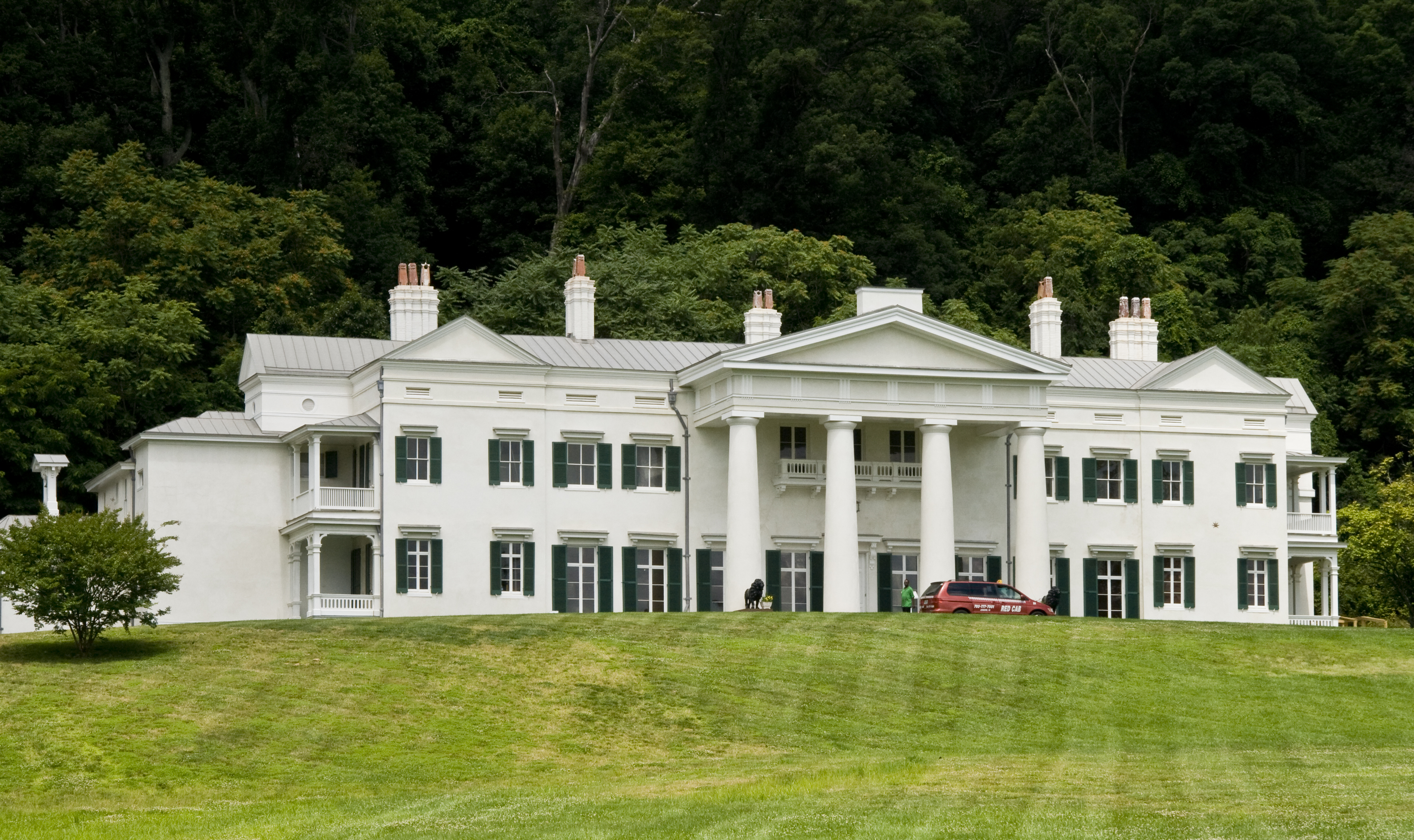
- Morven Park, June 2009

- Location within Northern Virginia Location within Virginia Location within the United States
- Location: 1 mile (1.6 km) northwest of Leesburg off U.S. 15, near Leesburg, Virginia
- Coordinates: 39°8′26.3″N 77°34′24.2″W
- Built: 1780
- Architect: Lind & Murdock; Thomas Swann, Jr.
- Architectural style: Greek Revival
- NRHP reference No.: 75002022
- VLR No.: 053-0087

Significant dates
- Added to NRHP: February 18, 1975
- Designated VLR: November 19, 1974; March 13, 2008

Morven Park is a 1,000-acre historic estate and horse park in Leesburg, Virginia, United States. Located on the grounds are the Morven Park Mansion, the Winmill Carriage Museum, formal boxwood gardens, miles of hiking and riding trails, and athletic fields. The park is also home to the Museum of Hounds and Hunting of North America with displays of art, artifacts and memorabilia about the sport of foxhunting.

The Mansion, once the home of Thomas Swann, Jr., governor of Maryland after the Civil War and Westmoreland Davis, governor of Virginia during World War I, is on the National Register of Historic Places and is a Virginia Historic Landmark. The Westmoreland Davis Memorial Foundation operates Morven Park, which is a 501c3 nonprofit organization supported by contributions from donors.

The world-renowned Morven Park International Equestrian Center hosts Olympic equestrians and top-level riders from around the world who come to compete in Horse Trials, Dressage, Hunter/Jumper shows, Pony Club and Carriage Driving events. From 1980 until 2010, Morven Park was the site of the Morven Park Steeplechase Races, one of the most popular race meets in the country.

Complicating matters, another former plantation far to the south in Albemarle County, Virginia has been called "Morven Farms" since the early 19th century. It includes a plantation formerly called "Indian Camp" which William Short, whom Thomas Jefferson sometimes called his "adoptive son", had bought in 1796 and sold in 1813 to merchant David Higgenbotham, who consolidated it with adjacent properties and changed the name to "Morven Farm". In the early 20th century, like this property, it was an equestrian facility and stud farm, as well as added to the Virginia Landmarks Register and National Register of historic places. Philanthropist John Kluge donated it to the University of Virginia Foundation in 2001, and while half was sold, the remainder is now operated as a sustainability lab by the University of Virginia.

== History ==
The first structures on the site of Morven Park date to about 1780. A fieldstone house built by Wilson Cary Seldon is now a part of the north wing of the main house, stuccoed over to match the rest of the mansion. Judge Thomas Swann acquired the property around 1800. Around 1830 Swann built the center two-story portion of the house, with flanking pavilions. It is not known whether the pavilions were initially linked to the house, but the renovations included the prominent tetrastyle Greek Revival portico that dominates the front portico. While the brick structure remains, now stuccoed, none of the Swann interiors exist. Judge Swann's son, Thomas Swann Jr., began a remodeling program around 1850, using the Baltimore firm of E.G. Lind and William T. Murdock as architects, converting the Palladian house to the Italianate style with four towers, including one that was five stories tall, stated by The Buildings of Virginia to resemble Queen Victoria's Osborne House on the Isle of Wight. The pavilions were by this time linked to the main house. The towers were later removed by Thomas Swann Jr.'s daughter, Mary Mercer Swann Carter, and her husband, Dr. Shirley Carter. They made more changes, raising the height of the hyphens to two stories and reworking the interior.

Westmoreland Davis, a New York lawyer, had roots in Virginia and purchased Morven Park in 1903. He and his wife, Marguerite Inman Davis, were avid equestrians, and they quickly became involved in the Virginia fox hunting community. Davis was a founding member of the Loudoun Hunt and served as Master of Foxhounds. He later made Morven Park into an agricultural showpiece, while his wife developed formal boxwood gardens near the house. He served as Virginia's governor from 1918 to 1922. He and his wife were the last private owners of the estate, which is now run as a nonprofit organization that raises money to keep the park open to the public.

From 1967 to 1991, Morven Park was home to the world-renowned Morven Park International Equestrian Institute. The institute was a training center for riding instructors, teaching advanced dressage, 3-day-eventing and show jumping. A number of expert riders trained at Morven Park went on to international equestrian competition. In its day, Morven Park was considered the most prestigious riding school in the United States, and flourished under the direction of Major John Lynch, formerly an instructor at the Army School of Equitation at Weedon, as well as at the English military academies of Sandhurst and Woolrich. He had been coach and trainer to British, Irish and American Olympic teams.

== Today ==
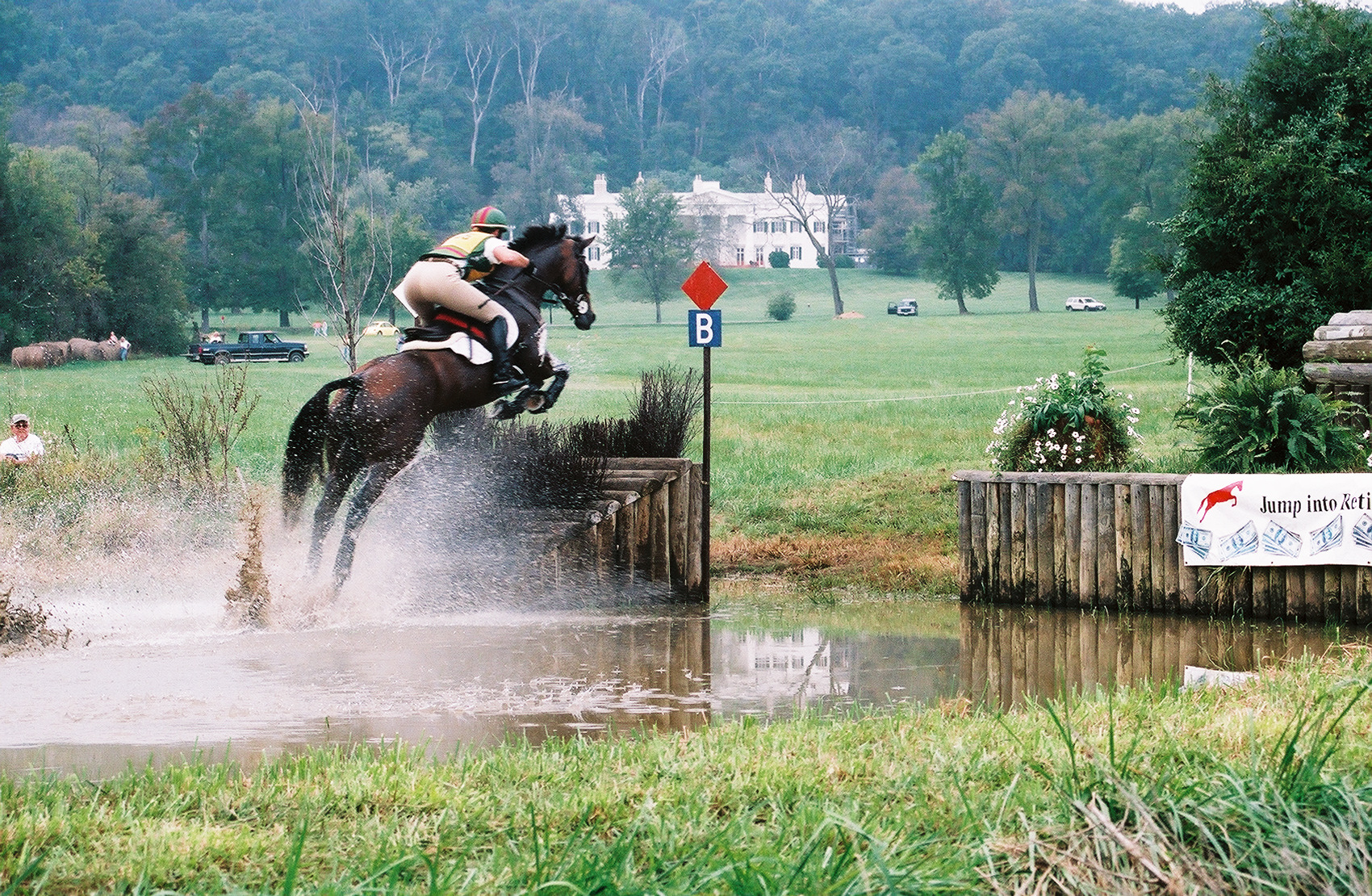
With the historic Governor's Mansion in the distance, an equestrian guides his horse through Poplar Puddle and over a hurdle during one of the many horse races held every year at Morven Park's International Equestrian Center.

In 2017 Morven Park International Equestrian Center began a multimillion-dollar renovation and Polo in the Park was launched.

== Programs ==
With its 1,000 acres of rolling hills and pristine landscapes, Morven Park is considered to be the "Central Park" of rapidly growing Loudoun County, Virginia, the wealthiest county in the United States. Every year, more than 200,000 visitors enjoy a variety of recreational activities, including hiking, museum tours, equestrian events, and field sports. As a nonprofit organization, Morven Park relies on donations from supporters to keep its gates open to visitors.

Morven Park is also the home of the Center for Civic Impact, which teaches civic skills that help prepare students in grades K–12 to become engaged citizens. In partnership with Loudoun County Public Schools, this program complements elementary, middle and high school curricula, and expands, invigorates and connects classroom learning to the real world.

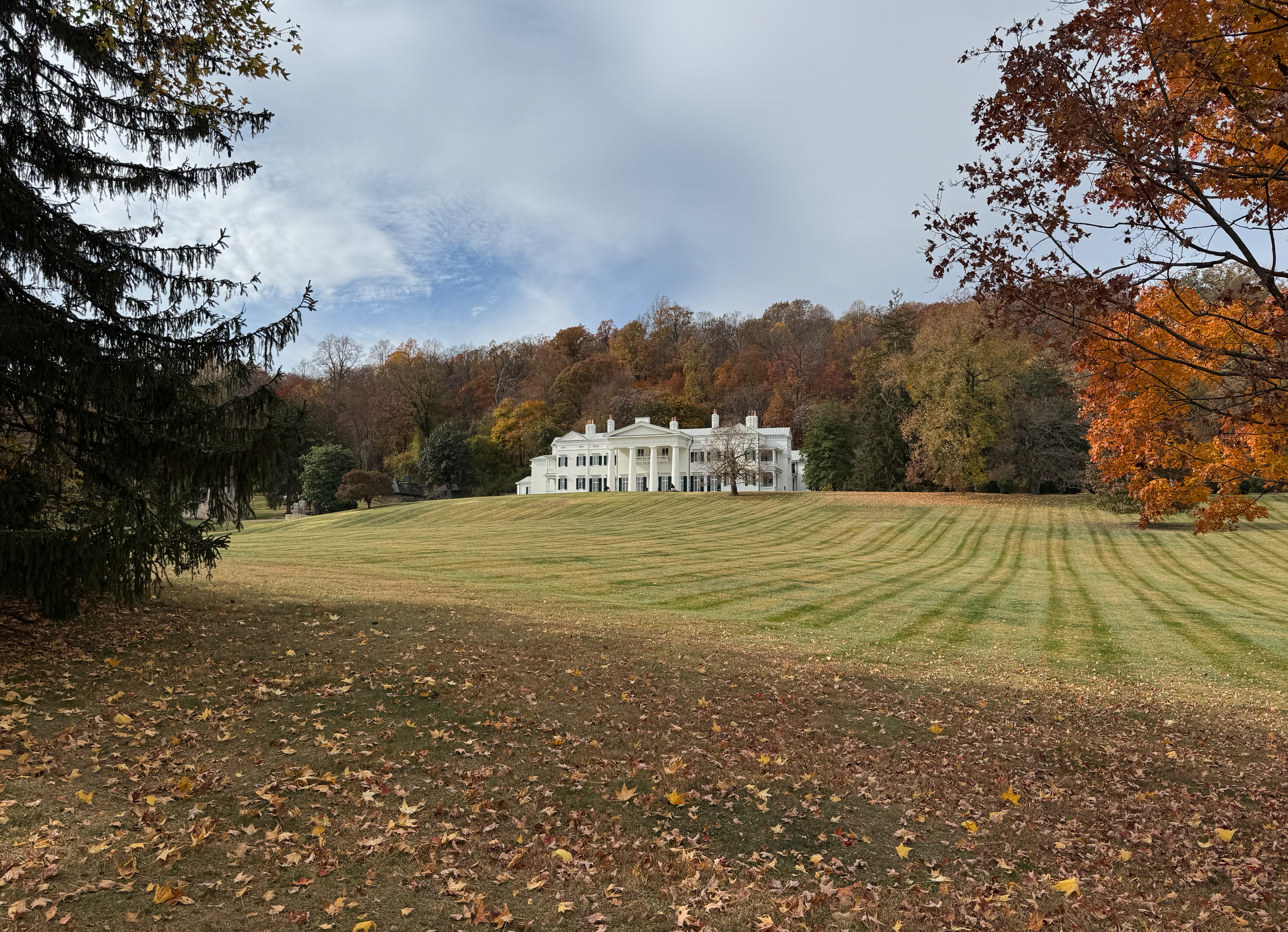
View across lawn at Morven Park
