= Westmoreland Davis =

American politician (1859–1942)

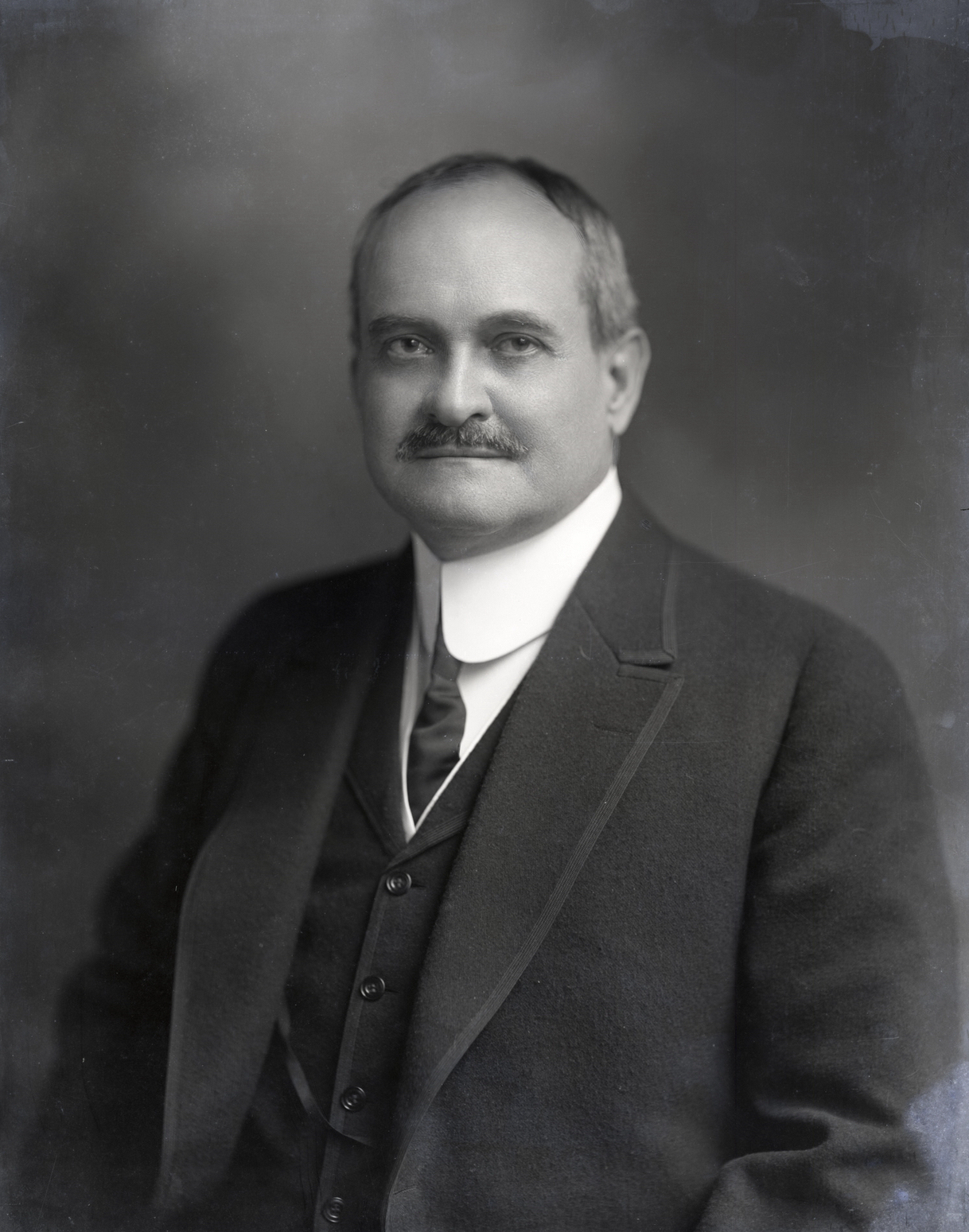
- Portrait of Davis, 1920

48th Governor of Virginia
- In office February 1, 1918 – February 1, 1922
- Lieutenant: Benjamin F. Buchanan
- Preceded by: Henry Carter Stuart
- Succeeded by: E. Lee Trinkle

Personal details
- Born: August 21, 1859 At sea
- Died: September 2, 1942 (aged 83) Baltimore, Maryland, U.S.
- Resting place: Morven Park
- Party: Democratic
- Spouse: Marguerite Inman
- Education: Virginia Military Institute; Columbia University
- Occupation: Lawyer; politician; planter

Westmoreland "Morley" Davis (/ˈwɛstmɔːrlənd/; August 21, 1859 – September 2, 1942) was an American lawyer, politician, and the 48th Governor of Virginia, serving from February 1, 1918 to February 1, 1922.

== Biography ==
Davis was born to a wealthy and prominent family on August 21, 1859. He was born on a boat in the Atlantic Ocean. The Davis family lost much of its wealth during the American Civil War. Davis and his mother, Annie, left a widow, struggled financially after the war, but he was able to attend the Virginia Military Institute on a scholarship. He was the youngest Cadet to ever attend at the age of 14. After graduating in 1877, he taught for 2 years then went to work as a clerk for the railroad company. Later, he "completed a year of post-graduate study at the University of Virginia in 1883," and studied at Columbia Law School from 1884 until graduating in 1886. He joined an elite New York City law firm and became wealthy.

In 1903, Davis purchased Morven Park, in the heart of Virginia's horse country. He and his wife Marguerite were avid equestrians and he soon founded the Loudoun Hunt, becoming the Master of Foxhounds for the club. He also planned to take up farming, despite his lack of experience. Davis advocated reform in farming, especially the use of science to improve productivity and sanitation. In 1912, he bought the magazine Southern Planter, one of the most popular magazines in the South. He used his position to advocate his ideas on farming and for political aid to farmers.

Davis was a presidential elector in 1916. Virginia elected him governor in 1917 on a "wet," or anti-Prohibition, platform. As governor, Davis sent increased funding to Virginia's colleges and universities. He also pressed for aid to farmers and funding for scientific farming research. In general, he reformed and modernized the Virginia government. While governor, he was a delegate to the Democratic National Convention of 1920.

Davis died on September 2, 1942, in a Baltimore hospital after suffering a stroke and was buried at Morven Park. His executive papers from his time as Governor of Virginia can be found at the Library of Virginia.

== Election ==
In 1917, Davis was elected Governor of Virginia with 71.47% of the vote, defeating Republican Thomas J. Muncy and Socialist Frank Smith.

Party political offices
Preceded by Henry Carter Stuart	Democratic nominee for Governor of Virginia; 1917	Succeeded by Elbert Lee Trinkle
Political offices
Preceded by Henry Carter Stuart	Governor of Virginia; 1918–1922	Succeeded by Elbert Lee Trinkle
