= Mohamad Anas Haitham Soueid =

Accused by U.S. for spying for Syria

- Born: Syria
- Other names: Alex Soueid, Anas Alswaid
- Citizenship: American
- Status: Convicted
- Allegiance: Government of Syrian President Bashar al-Assad
- Criminal charges: Espionage

Mohamad Anas Haitham Soueid (also known as Alex Soueid and Anas Alswaid) is a Syrian-born naturalized United States citizen and a resident of Leesburg, Virginia who was indicted on espionage-related charges by federal prosecutors in October 2011. Soueid, 47 years old, is accused of passing information about Syrian American protesters in the United States to the government of Syrian President Bashar al-Assad, who are thought to have arrested and tortured numerous Syrian political refugees' family members and associates living in Syria.

The arrest and indictment occurred during the 2011 Syrian uprising, in which the Syrian government has allegedly violently reacted to demonstrations against the government and in some instances has harassed Syrian exiles living abroad. According to the New York Times, "the details laid out by the Justice Department lent greater support to claims by Syrian activists living abroad that they face systematic harassment, threats and intimidation – including being videotaped at protests supportive of the country’s antigovernment uprising – by people they believe to be agents of the Syrian government." An October 3 Amnesty International report stated that "protesters outside Syria have been systematically monitored and harassed by Syrian embassy officials and others believed to be acting on behalf of the Syrian regime." Syrian dissident Ahed al-Hendi, who coordinated demonstrations in Washington, stated that "The mentality of the Syrian regime is to track all the dissidents and know what they're doing."

== Early life and career ==
Soueid's cousin Rasha Elass stated that Soueid immigrated to the United States 20 years ago with $600 and eventually earned a salary of over $300,000 a year working for a Mercedes-Benz dealership in Virginia. Elass stated that, after the 2008 financial crisis, Soueid's mansion was foreclosed on and the family declared bankruptcy. The home, on Somercote Lane in Leesburg, sits on 13 acres, was built in 2007, and has a four-car garage. WJLA-TV interviewed a neighbor of the Soueid family who stated: "They seemed like really nice people. He was a high-end car salesman, used to sell Mercedes and some of these really high-end businesses and he ran into a little trouble. He was struggling as the economy took its downfall."

Following the economic downturn, an aunt of Soueid living in Paris wired $200,000 to Soueid via "an account in the name of a used car dealership". Elass stated that the $200,000 came from her family, which includes a "Saudi oil company executive", so Soueid could start a limousine service.

Soueid has a wife of 17 years and twin 15-year-old sons. Soueid's name is pronounced Swayd.

== Earlier civil lawsuit ==
Soueid was named as a defendant (under the Anas Alswaid name) in a civil lawsuit filed in the U.S. District Court for the District of Columbia in May 2011 by Syrian citizens and Syrian-Americans who claim to have been subjected to abuse by Syrian authorities and agents.

== Alleged spying activities ==
When Syrian American pro-democracy protesters held rallies against Bashir's government in the summer 2011, they reported noticing a middle-aged man with a camera in a Hummer. According to the Globe and Mail, "days later, thugs in Syria arrived at their relatives' homes in Syria, and dragged people away. One American dissident had her father killed."

On October 5, 2011, Soueid was indicted by a federal grand jury in the U.S. District Court for the Eastern District of Virginia in Alexandria with six criminal counts: One count of acting as an unregistered foreign agent of the Syrian government; two counts of providing false statements of a firearms purchase form; and two counts of making false statements to federal law enforcement. The charges in the indictment carry a maximum penalty of up to 40 years in prison: 15 on the conspiracy and foreign agent charges, 15 on firearms charges, and 10 on the false statements charges.

On October 12, the United States Department of Justice unsealed the indictment and announced that Soueid had been arrested the day before. Authorities stated that following his arrest, an AK-47 with five rounds of ammunition, two flak jackets, and a Kevlar helmet were found at Soueid's home. In a statement, the Justice Department stated that Soueid's actions were as part of a conspiracy to "undermine, silence, intimidate and potentially harm those in the United States and Syria who engaged in the protests". United States Ambassador to Syria Robert Stephen Ford has stated that there is evidence of multiple family members of Syrian-American protesters being arrested and tortured by the Syrian government.

The indictment deals with Soueid's alleged activity beginning in March 2011. The unregistered foreign agent count alleges that Soueid conspiring to collect information on individuals in the United States and Syria who were protesting the government of President Bashar Assad and acted as an agent for the Mukhabarat (Syrian intelligence agencies and secret police), passing along 20 audio and video recordings depicting American protests along with the phone numbers, email addresses, and other information on protesters. The indictment alleges Soueid sent a coded email message to Syrian intelligence in April describing a meeting of protesters in a Washington suburb in Virginia.

The indictment also alleges that Soueid met with Syrian intelligence officials and spoke with Assad privately on a June 2011 trip funded by the Syrian government, specifically stating that a July email he sent to an unidentified alleged co-conspirator included a photograph of Soueid meeting with Assad.

The two counts of making false statements in the indictment stem from the FBI's interview Soueid in August. Soueid was searched and questioned by authorities upon his return to the U.S. at the Washington Dulles International Airport and subsequently informed his handler that he would change procedures to avoid further scrutiny but would continue the "project". The indictment states that Soueid lied when he denied collecting information about protesters and passing information to the government of Syria.

The charge of listing a false current address on a firearms purchase application stems from Soueid's alleged purchase of a .40-caliber Beretta pistol on July 11.

The White House National Security Council spokesman stated that "This desperate effort to monitor protesters in the United States shows that the Assad government is grasping for any means to silence those speaking out against their brutal crackdown on peaceful protesters. But the government's efforts to monitor and silence protesters here in the United States will do nothing to satisfy men and women in Syria who are yearning for democracy and freedom. As long as Assad remains in power, we will continue working in concert with our international allies around the world to increase pressure on him and his government until he steps down."

The Syrian Embassy in Washington released a statement stating that the charges were "baseless and totally unacceptable" and part of "a campaign of distortion and fabrications against the Embassy of Syria in the U.S." The embassy denied that Soueid or any other U.S. citizen acted as an agent of the Syrian Government and denied any private meeting took place between Assad and Mr. Soueid.

== Case proceedings ==
Soueid made his first court appearance at 2 pm on October 12 before U.S. Magistrate Judge Theresa C. Buchanan. At the appearance, Dennis Fitzpatrick, the federal prosecutor for the case, stated that Soueid posed "a serious risk of flight", and the magistrate judge ordered Soueid held pending a detention hearing on October 14. Soueid appeared dressed in a black fleece sweater and blue jeans and stated that he had not yet had a chance to contact his attorney. Soueid subsequently obtained a defense attorney, Haytham Faraj.

At an October 18 hearing on bail before U.S. Magistrate Judge T. Rawles Jones, Jr., prosecutor Fitzpatrick argued that Soueid should be held pending trial, stating that Soueid could flee the country and emphasized Soueid's July meeting with Assad as well as "communications about setting up bank accounts in Peru, wire transfers of more than $200,000 from Syria via a French bank and a Citibank deposit of $4,000 made in $100 bills a day after spending more than an hour at the Syrian Embassy in Washington. Defense lawyer Faraj argued that electronic monitoring and house arrest were sufficient to ensure that Soueid would not contact anyone and argued that Soueid's ties to his family, a wife of 17 years and twin 15-year-old sons, made him less likely to be a flight risk. Jones ruled that Soueid should be freed from jail and placed on home detention while awaiting trial, stating, "Whatever he's done in the past, he's incapable of doing it now," Jones said. "He's, at worst, a low-level operative, and it's speculative that he would walk out on a family he's this close to." Soueid said that "There is no evidence that he is a trained operative." The prosecution gave immediate notice that the government planned to appeal and Rawles delayed implementation of the order until review by a district court judge.

At an October 28 hearing before U.S. District Judge Claude M. Hilton, Soueid pled not guilty. Hilton set the trial date at March 5, 2012 and reversed the magistrate judge's decision, ordering that Soueid be detained until the trial. At the hearing, prosecutor Fitzpatrick presented more detailed evidence to suggest that Soueid was a high-level operative, stating that the prosecution had "tread lightly" on presenting evidence at the detention hearing the week earlier because much of it came from a confidential source paid by the FBI whom the prosecution did not wish to endanger more. In a brief, Fitzpatrick described Soueid as wanting to retaliate against the two people who sued him and Syrian Embassy officials in a civil suit. Fitzpatrick stated that five days after Soueid had returned from the trip to Syria, Soueid had taken the confidential source to a Lorton, Virginia shooting range and asked the source if he had ever killed anyone. According to prosecutors, "the two reportedly agreed to stick with Plan A, collecting and delivering information about Syrian dissidents in the United States, until they needed Plan B, taking hostile action." Prosecutors allege that Soueid told a foreign intelligence contact about the source's shooting skills after their meeting. Fitzpatrick stressed Soueid's recent acquisition of a Syrian passport, stating that Soueid was "extension of the government of Syria" and "clearly has designs to flee". Defense attorney Faraj argued that the government's claims were exaggerated. Faraj stated that the weapons found at Soueid's home reflected that Soueid was a long-time member of the National Rifle Association of America who frequented shooting ranges and hunted with his twin sons, and the overseas intelligence contact was merely a friend of Soueid's. Faraj stated that Soueid's Syrian passport reflected "home pride". Reuters reported that Soueid was dressed in a green prison jumpsuit for the hearing and "bowed his head after the judge's decision, running his hands through his hair", mouthing "it's OK" and giving a "thumbs up" gesture to his family members as he was led from the courtroom. CNN reported that after the hearing Faraj stated that "he is considering whether to appeal Soueid's continued detention to the Fourth Circuit Court of Appeals", although "he acknowledged such appeals are rarely successful".

He was convicted of unlawfully acting as an agent of a foreign government on March 26, 2012.
