= Viola Townsend Winmill =

American horsewoman

Viola Townsend Winmill (1891–1975) was an American sportswoman, foxhunter rider and coach driver. Between 1927 and 1935, Winmill was the master of the Warrenton Foxhunt.

== Biography ==
Born in New York City, Winmill, a race horse owner, was married to Robert Campbell Winmill. They bought a farm in 1922 in Warrenton and kept a number of race horses and hunters.

She also was known for driving a tiny coach used by General Tom Thumb, and for owning a Chincoteague pony, as well as a zebra.

Morven Park has a collection of nearly 40 of Winmill's carriages in the Winmill Carriage Museum.
