= Civilian Police International =

International security

Civilian Police International is a government sub-contract company specializing in International Police government contracts that call for American police officers to serve in international locations under the direction of the US State Department.

Civilian Police International has international contracts in Jordan, Kosovo and Afghanistan. The company solicits resumes from police officers, attorneys, judges, prosecutors and persons with relevant international NGO experience.
