= Rohlig =

Rohlig may refer to:

- Harald Rohlig (1926–2014), German musician
- Röhlig Logistics, a German international logistic company
