= St. John's Episcopal Church (Montgomery, Alabama) =

Historic church in Alabama, United States

- U.S. National Register of Historic Places
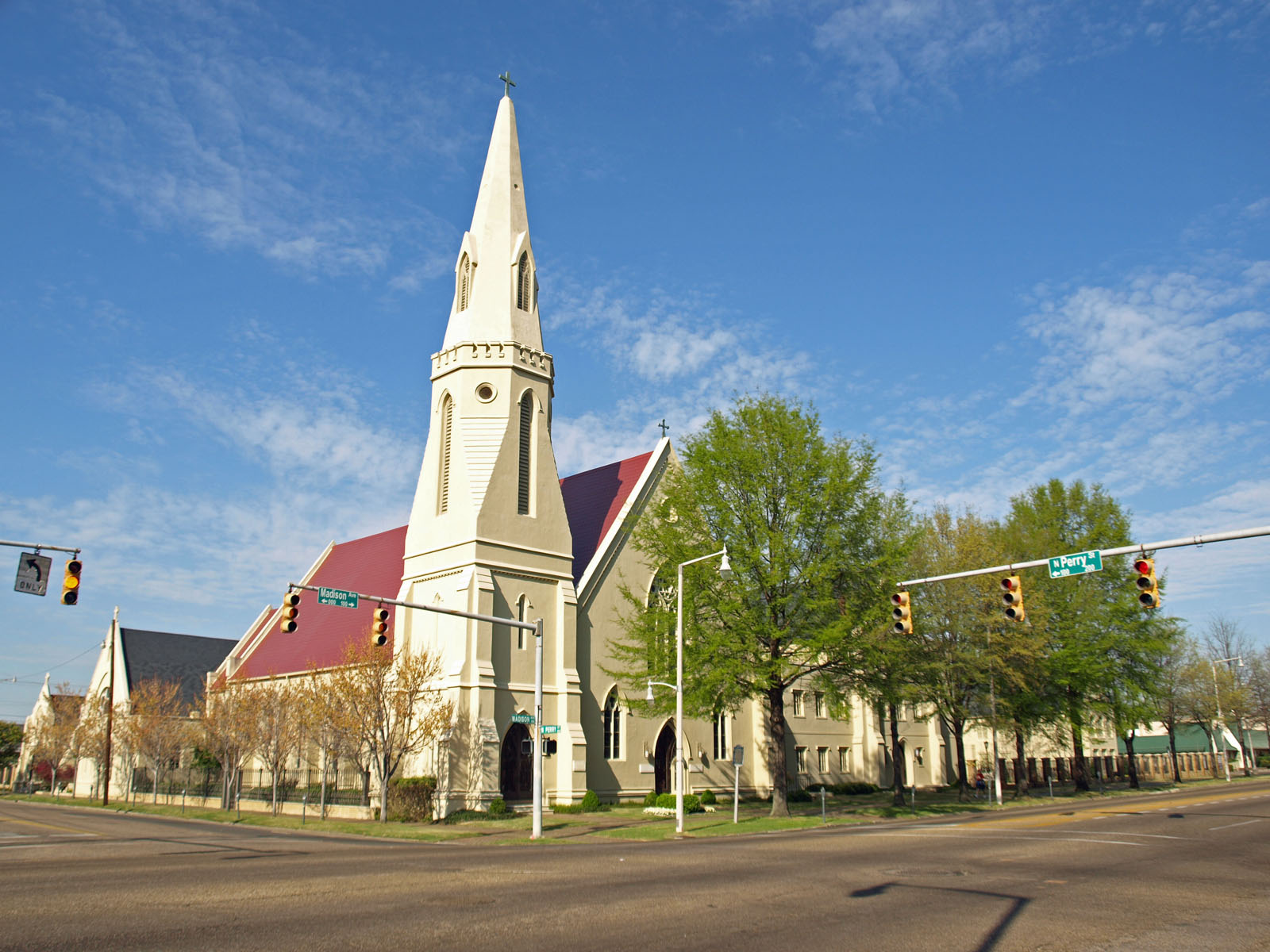
- St. John's Episcopal Church in 2009.

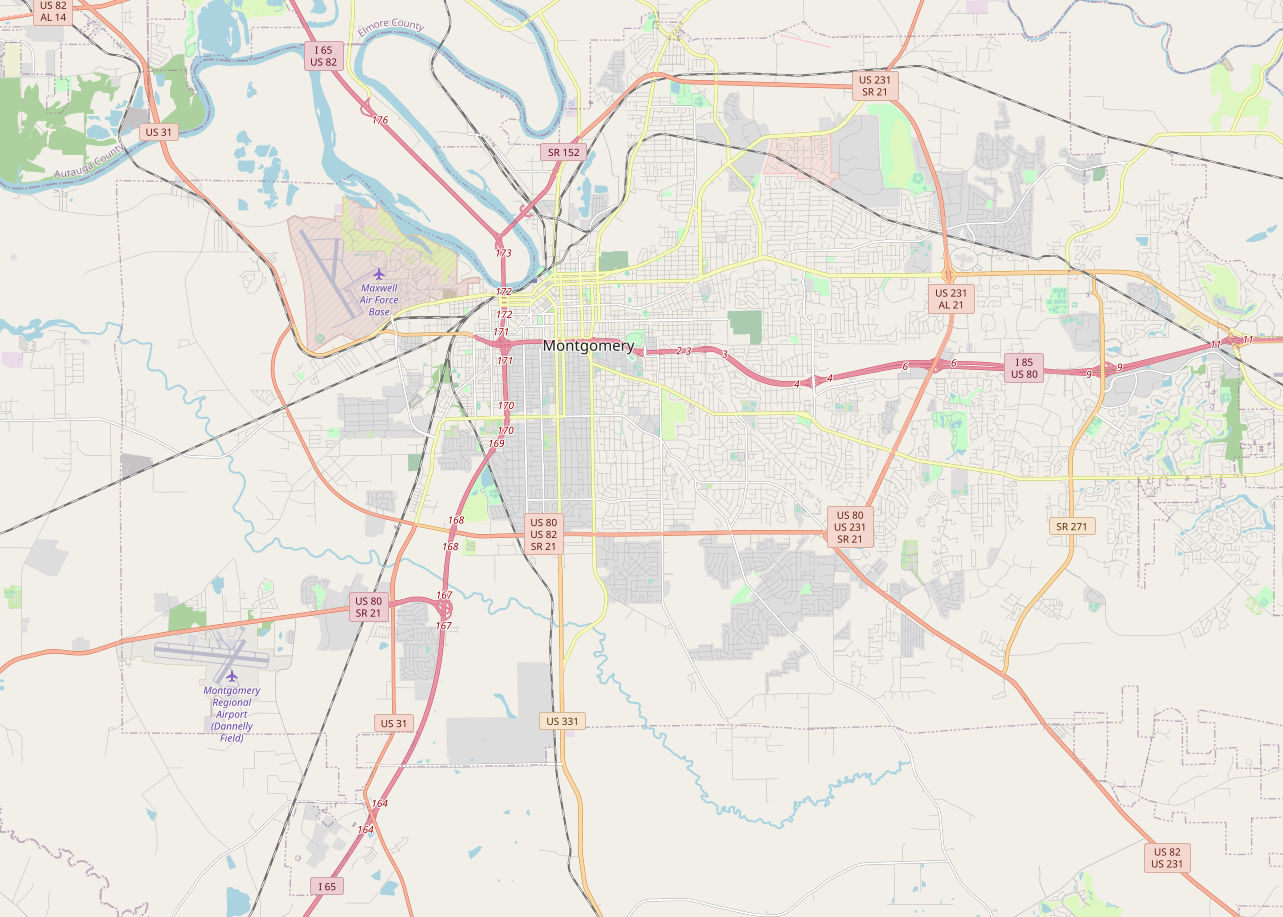
- Location within Montgomery, Alabama Location within Alabama Location within the United States
- Location: 113 Madison Ave., Montgomery, Alabama
- Coordinates: 32°22′49″N 86°18′26″W
- Area: less than one acre
- Built: 1854-55
- Architect: Frank Wills; Henry Dudley
- Architectural style: Gothic Revival
- NRHP reference No.: 75000326
- Added to NRHP: February 24, 1975

St. John's Episcopal Church is a historic Gothic Revival church in Montgomery, Alabama, United States. It was designed by the New York City architectural firm of Frank Wills and Henry Dudley. The church was placed on the National Register of Historic Places on 24 February 1975.

== History ==
St. John's parish was organized in 1834 and by 1837 the parishioners had moved into a modest brick sanctuary on the corner of Perry and Jefferson Streets. After little more than a decade, the church needed to expand after the state capital moved to Montgomery and a rise in cotton production swelled the region's population. The current building was completed in 1855, in the same city block as the old, but facing Madison Street.

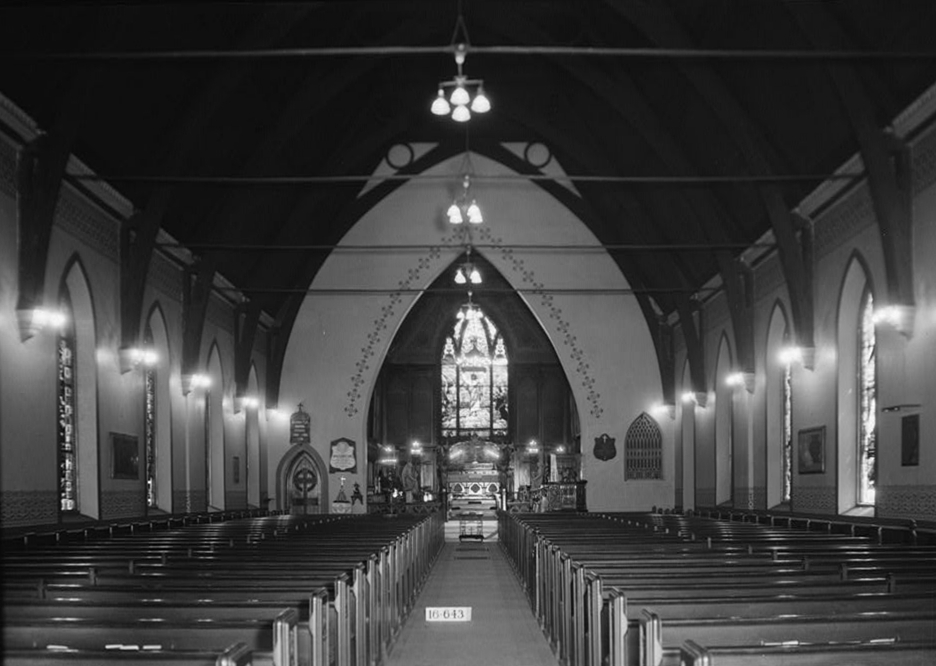
An interior view toward the altar in 1934.

St. John's Episcopal Church was involved in several historic events around the time of the American Civil War. It hosted the Secession Convention of Southern Churches in 1861, which had helped fuel the South's secession movement. St. John's was also the church attended by the Confederate President, Jefferson Davis, when Montgomery was the capital of the Confederate States of America. The church was forced to close its doors in 1865 under Union Army orders; it would reopen for services in 1866.

The old building from the 1830s was torn down in 1869 and its bricks were used to construct an addition to the main structure. The building was expanded again in 1906. The church hosted many Army recruits from the nearby "Camp Sheridan" tent city during World War I, until the 1918 Spanish flu pandemic forced the church to temporarily close its doors.

Between 1898 and 1901, St. John's rector was Edgar Gardner Murphy, who played a leading role in organizing first the Alabama and then the National Child Labor Committee, which campaigned to strict limits on employment of children in factories. In 1901, he left St. John's to take over leadership of the Southern Education Board, an organization devoted to improving education—particularly public education—in the region.

In May 1925, a bronze plaque in honor of President Jefferson Davis was dedicated. John Trotwood Moore, the State Librarian and Archivist of Tennessee, known defender of the KKK, lynching, and segregation was invited to give a speech. In 2019, after further researching the political context and motivations surrounding the dedication of the plaque (and later a pew dedicated to Davis in 1931) the vestry of St. John's voted to have the plaque and pew removed from the sanctuary and moved to the parish archives.

The church was renovated in the 1950s and again in 2006.

== See also ==
- National Register of Historic Places listings in Montgomery County, Alabama
- Episcopal Church of the Nativity (Huntsville, Alabama)
- Trinity Episcopal Church (Mobile, Alabama)
- Historical Marker Database
