= Montgomery House (Madison, Mississippi) =

Historic house in Mississippi, United States

- U.S. National Register of Historic Places
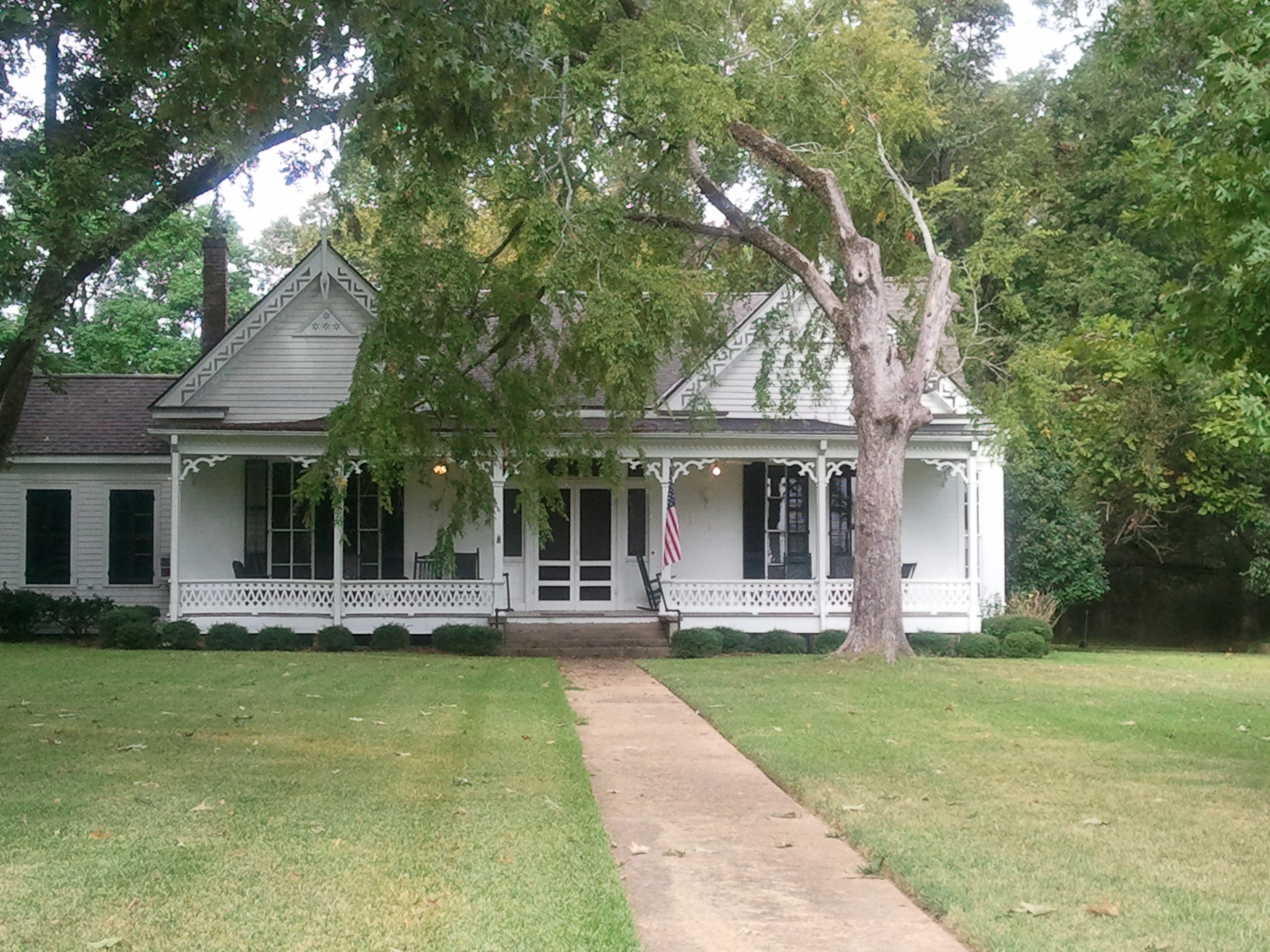

- Location within Mississippi Location within the United States
- Location: Main St., Madison, Mississippi
- Coordinates: 32°27′42″N 90°7′6″W
- Built: c. 1852
- Architectural style: Late Gothic Revival
- NRHP reference No.: 84002260
- Added to NRHP: September 7, 1984

Montgomery House in Madison, Mississippi is a picturesque one-story Gothic Revival house that was built in c. 1852. It was listed on the National Register of Historic Places in 1984.

Its design is attributed to British-born architect Frank Wills, who is known for his designs of Gothic Revival churches. Wills designed the Chapel of the Cross in Madison which was built during 1850–52.
