= Harald Rohlig =

German musician

Dr. Harald Rohlig
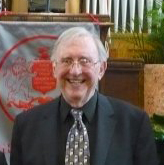
- Born: 6 October 1926; Aurich, Germany
- Died: 25 October 2014 (aged 88); Montgomery Alabama, U.S.
- Occupation(s): Musician, Professor
- Years active: 1948–2012
- Spouses: Ingeborg Lieverz Rohlig (m. 1953–1999); Jeanette Lynn (m. 2005–2014)

Harald Ernst Hermann Rohlig (originally Röhlig; 6 October 1926 – 25 October 2014) was a German musician.

== Early life ==
The son of a Methodist clergyman who opposed Hitler's regime, Rohlig was forced to join the Hitler Youth at age of 10 when his family's food and basic necessities were restricted. His father was later incarcerated at the Bergen-Belsen concentration camp. In 1943, Rohlig was drafted into the Luftwaffe. Before World War II ended he was captured by American soldiers, from whom he received good treatment, and spent three years in a French prison camp.

=== Education ===
After his release from the prison camp in 1948, Rohlig returned to his musical studies. A musical prodigy who was composing and concertizing before he was in his teens, Rohlig studied at the Royal Academy of Music in London and earned his doctorate in pipe organ design from Osnabruck Conservatory.

== Career ==
In 1953, he immigrated with his wife Ingeborg Lieverz Rohlig, a violinist, to Linden, Alabama, where he taught piano and organ, played the organ, and conducted choirs at the Methodist and Baptist churches.

He moved to Montgomery, Alabama, in 1955 to take a faculty position at Huntingdon College. Rohlig taught at Huntingdon for more than fifty years, where he was awarded every teaching honor the college grants. He retired from Huntingdon in 2006 and continued to compose, teach private piano and organ lessons, and serve as organist and choir master at St. John's Episcopal Church in Montgomery until 2012. He stepped down from his position at St. John's Episcopal Church in Montgomery in early 2012, a position which he had held since 1962, for reasons relating to his health.

=== Achievements ===
During his career wrote over 1,000 pieces of music and published over 300 works. His legacy includes design of several neo-Baroque pipe organs in the Southeast, including one in Tuscaloosa, Alabama. In 2000, the United Methodist Foundation for Christian Higher Education named him Educator of the Year.

== Personal life ==
His wife Inge died in 1999. In July 2005 he married Jeanette Lynn. In 2008 his daughter Deborah Anne died. In 2012 his son Detlev Harald died.

== Sources ==
The instrument referenced is likely the one at St. Matthias Episcopal Church. Mary Alice Fields, one of his students, was the organist of this church for several years and during the time the instrument was built. The instrument was built by the same organ building firm (Wicks) as the instrument at St. John's Episcopal in Montgomery along neo-Baroque lines. While not conclusive, the preponderance of evidence suggests the instrument referenced is at St. Matthias Episcopal Church. Information from Matthew Alan Edwards, who was the organist/choirmaster of St. Matthias from 2015 to 2019.

- Guide to the Harald Rohlig Papers, W.S. Hoole Special Collections Library, The University of Alabama
- , Annual Parish Report for 2012, St. John's Episcopal Church - Montgomery, AL
- , Living a childhood dream, The Tuscaloosa News
