= Frank Wills (architect) =

American architect (1822–1857)

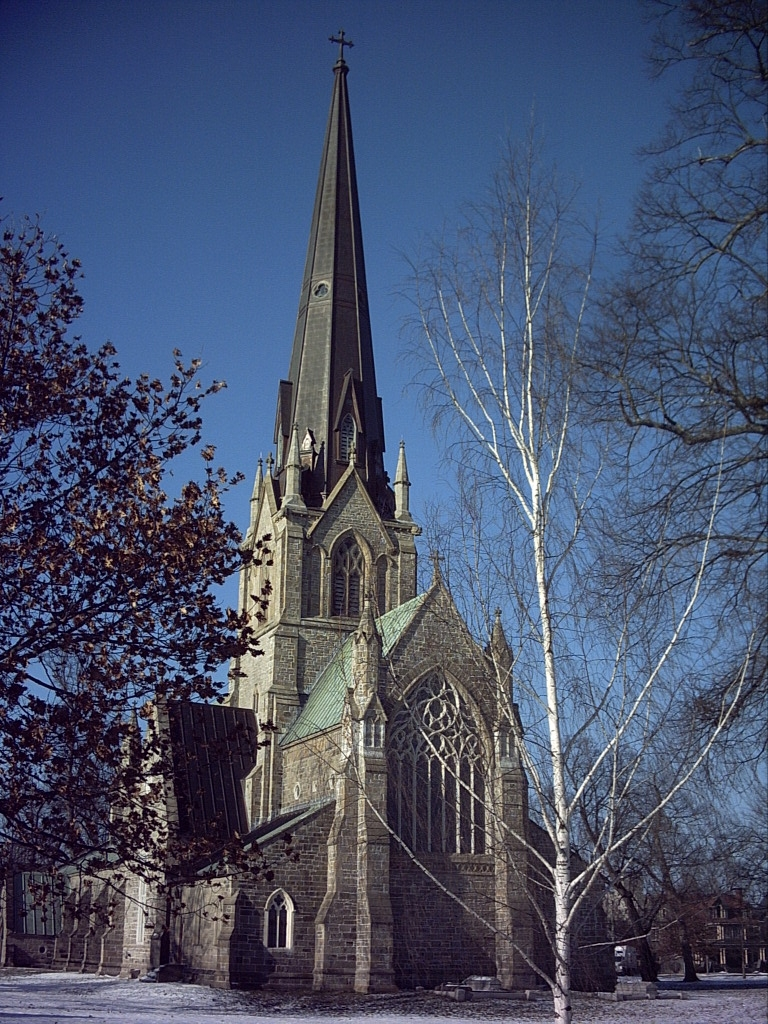
- Christ Church Cathedral in Fredericton, New Brunswick
- Born: December 1822; Exeter, England
- Died: 22 April 1857 (aged 34); Montreal
- Occupation: Architect
- Buildings: Christ Church Cathedral; Episcopal Church of the Nativity; Christ Church Cathedral

Frank Wills (December 1822 – 22 April 1857) was a British-born Canadian architect who is associated with the design of early Gothic Revival churches in North America.

== Biography ==
Frank Wills was born in Exeter, in December 1822, where he started working under John Hayward. He was a member of the Exeter Architectural Society, and his first known work is a canopied tomb in Gothic style beside the high altar in St. Thomas' Church in Exeter. In 1842, Wills exhibited at the Royal Academy of Arts in London.

He emigrated to New Brunswick in 1845 to work on Christ Church Cathedral in Fredericton, which he modelled on St. Mary's Church in Snettisham, Norfolk. He moved to New York City, began an architectural firm in late 1847 and married Emily Coster in 1848. He became associated with the New York Ecclesiology Society and soon was the official architect for that group. In 1850, he published Ancient Ecclesiastical Architecture and Its Principles, Applied to the Wants of the Church at the Present Day. Emily died in the same year.

In 1851, he took a partner into his firm, Henry Dudley, who had also worked under Hayward in Exeter. He remarried to Almy Warne Casey in November 1853; she was the daughter of the Philadelphia iron merchant James Casey. They had one son, Charles James Wills. Frank Wills died in Montreal, on 22 April 1857, where he was working on Christ Church Cathedral.

== Works ==
Selected works by him or his firm include:

- Christ Church Cathedral (1845–53) in Fredericton, New Brunswick.
- St. Anne's Chapel (1846–47) in Fredericton, New Brunswick.
- The Church of the Holy Innocents (1848) in Albany, New York.
- Grace Church (1849–52) in Albany, New York.
- The House of Prayer (1849–53) in Newark, New Jersey.
- St. Peter's Episcopal Church (1848–1860) in Spotswood, New Jersey.
- Anglican Church (1850) in Burton, New Brunswick.
- St. Peter's Church (1850–51) in Milford, Connecticut.
- Chapel of the Cross (1850–52) in Madison, Mississippi.
- St. Mary's Church (1851) in Abingdon, Maryland.
- Montgomery House (c. 1852) in Madison, Mississippi
- Holy Trinity Episcopal Church (1852–53) in Nashville, Tennessee.
- Trinity Episcopal Church (1853–57) in Mobile, Alabama.
- Christ Church (1853) in Napoleonville, Louisiana.
- Holy Trinity Church (1853) in Claremont, New Hampshire.
- St. George's Church (1853–54) in Flushing, New York.
- St. John's Church (1853–58) in Troy, New York.
- St. Michael's Church (1854) in Sillery, Quebec.
- Christ's Church, Rye (1854–55) in Rye, New York (subsequently rebuilt).
- St. John's Episcopal Church (1854–55) in Montgomery, Alabama.
- Christ Church (1855–59) in Oberlin, Ohio.
- Trinity Episcopal Church (1856-59) in Connersville, Indiana.
- Episcopal Church of the Nativity (1857–59) in Huntsville, Alabama.
- Christ Church Cathedral (1857–59) in Montreal, Quebec.
- Saint George's (1856–58) in Portage-du-Fort, Quebec, Canada

Also, based on similarities, three other churches are believed to be from his firm:

- Trinity Episcopal Church (1855) Scotland Neck, North Carolina.
- Church of the Nativity (1856–59) in Union, South Carolina.
- Trinity Church (1857–60) in Natchitoches, Louisiana.
