= St. Peter's Episcopal Church (Milford, Connecticut) =

Historic church in Connecticut, United States

- U.S. National Register of Historic Places
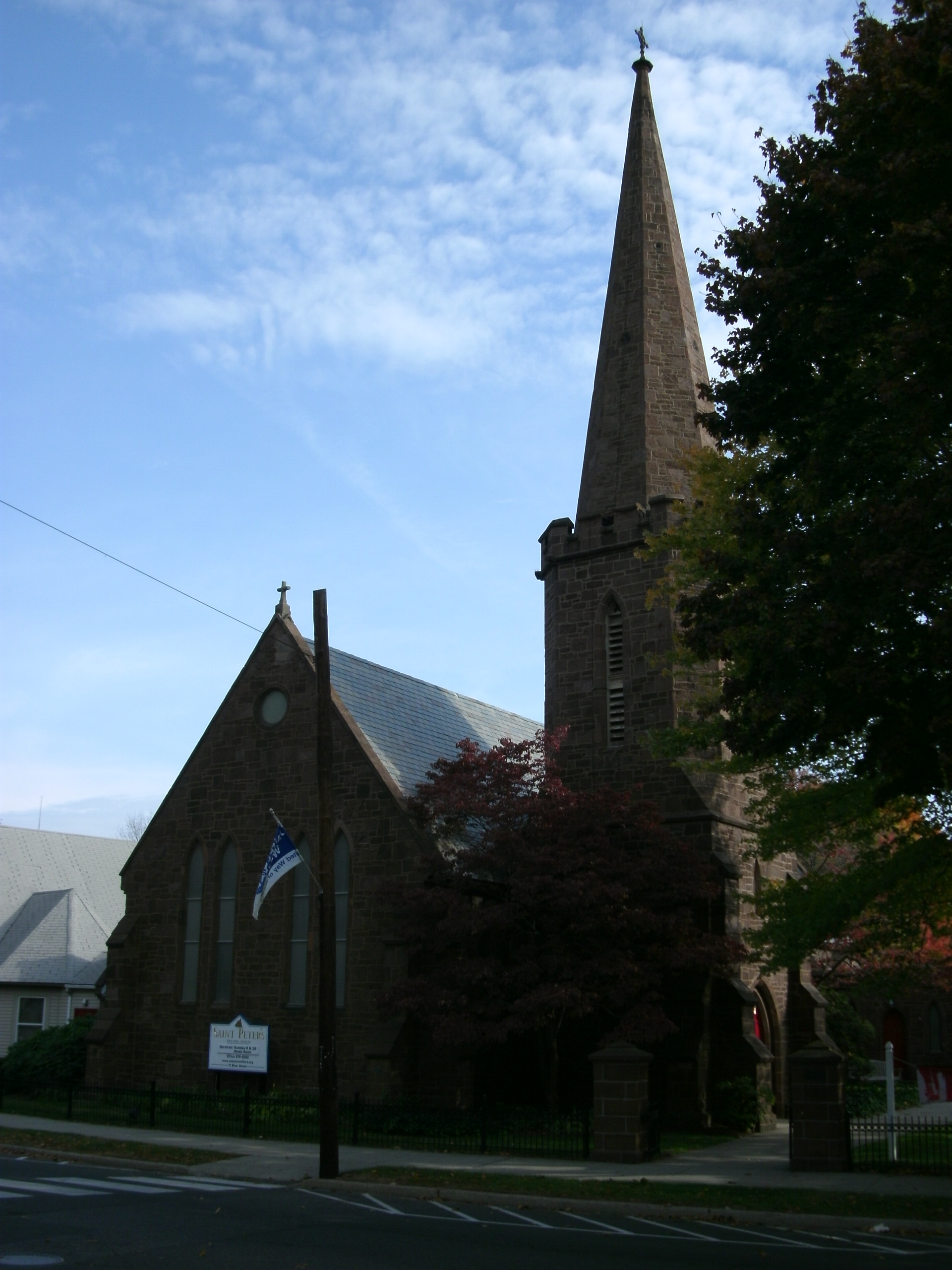
- St. Peter's Episcopal Church, October 2010

- Location within Connecticut Location within the United States
- Location: 61, 71, 81 River Street, Milford, Connecticut
- Coordinates: 41°13′27″N 73°3′27″W
- Area: 1 acre (0.40 ha)
- Built: 1850
- Architect: Frank Wills
- Architectural style: Gothic Revival
- NRHP reference No.: 79002644
- Added to NRHP: August 21, 1979

St. Peter's Episcopal Church is a historic church complex at 61, 71, and 81 River Street in Milford, Connecticut. It includes a Gothic Revival church built out of Portland, Connecticut brownstone in 1850–51, and a rectory and parish hall, added on either side of the church in the mid-1890s. The church is a significant work of Frank Wills, a major proponent of the Gothic Revival. The church is also one of the few surviving 19th-century buildings in Milford's civic center. The complex was listed on the National Register of Historic Places in 1979.

The church reported 2018 members in 2023 and 316 members in 2025. Plate and pledge income reported for the congregation in 2025 was $242,285. Average Sunday attendance (ASA) in 2025 was 103 persons, down from a reported 135 in 2019.

== Architecture and history ==
St. Peter's Episcopal Church stands in the city center of Milford, set between the Wepawaug River and River Street a short way north of the commercial downtown area. It is a large masonry structure, built out of brownstone from Portland, Connecticut. It has a basically cruciform plan, with the tower taking up one of the short branches of the cross. It has a square base in which the main building entrance is located, an octagonal second stage topped by a crenellations, and an octagonal spire. The building exhibits typical Gothic Revival features, including buttresses demarcating the building bays, narrow arched windows, and finials at the rooftop gable ends.

The Anglican congregation in Milford was founded in the mid-18th century, with informal services beginning as early as the 1730s under the auspices of Samuel Johnson. The congregation was formally organized in 1764, and its first church was built in 1775 in the immediate area of the current church. The present building was built in 1850-51 to replace the earlier structure, which was in need of extensive repairs. Architect Frank Wills, a major proponent of the Ecclesiological movement which espoused a return to Gothic features for churches, was retained to design the new building. The church is one of the best early examples of that movement's architectural principles.

== See also ==
- National Register of Historic Places listings in New Haven County, Connecticut
