= Holy Trinity Church (Nashville) =

Historic church in Tennessee, United States

- U.S. National Register of Historic Places
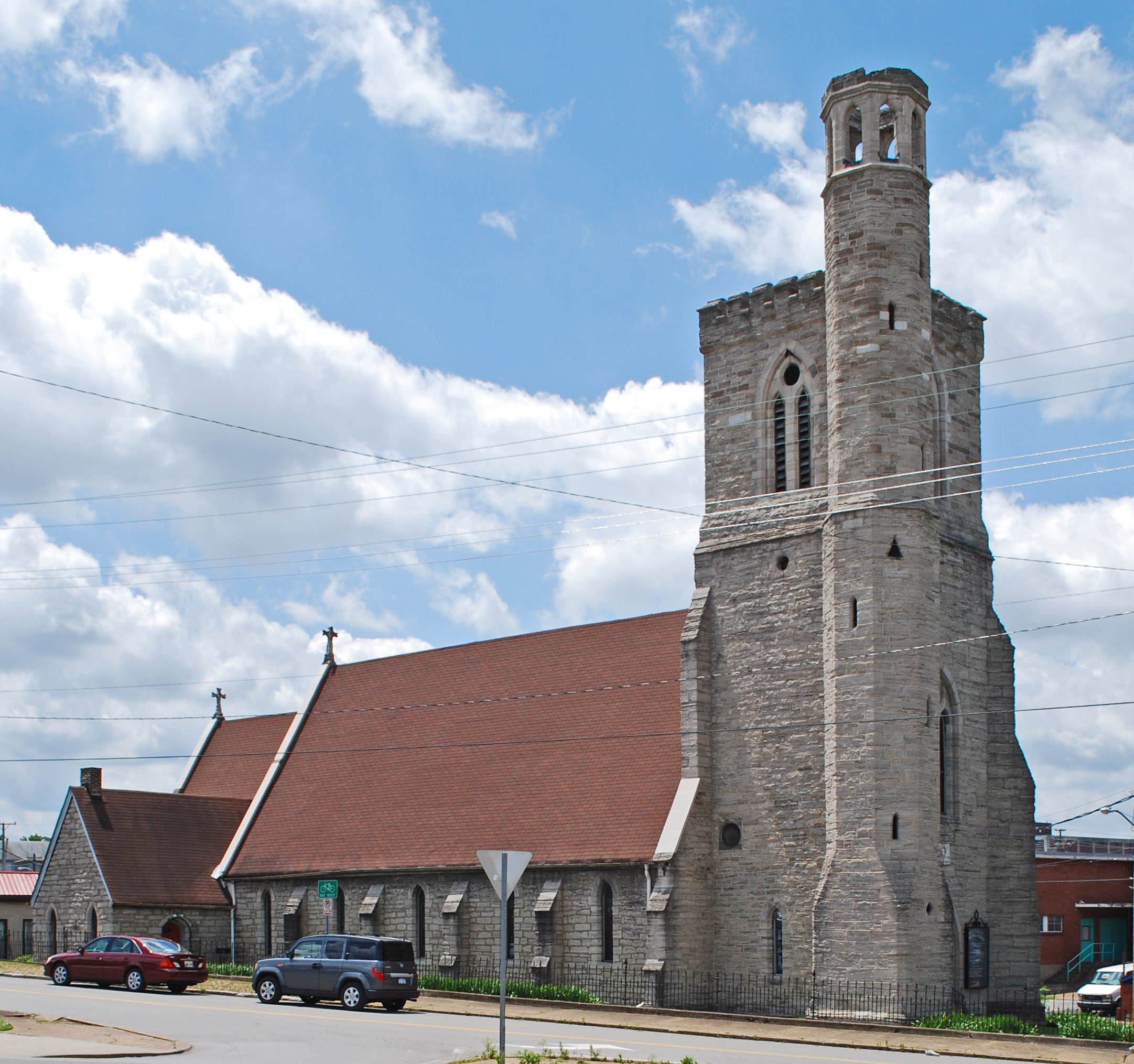

- Location within Tennessee Location within the United States
- Location: 615 6th Ave., S., Nashville, Tennessee
- Coordinates: 36°9′10″N 86°46′33″W
- Area: 1 acre (0.40 ha)
- Built: 1852
- Architect: Frank Wills, Henry C. Dudley
- Architectural style: Gothic Revival
- Website: http://chtnashville.com/
- MPS: Nineteenth Century Churches of South Nashville Thematic Resources
- NRHP reference No.: 72001234
- Added to NRHP: April 14, 1972

Holy Trinity Church (also known as Church of the Holy Trinity) is a historic Episcopal church at 615 6th Avenue South in Nashville, Tennessee, currently a parish of the Episcopal Diocese of Tennessee. The congregation was formed in 1849 as a mission of the nearby Christ Church Episcopal, attained parish status in 1851, and grew to around fifty members per service by the beginning of the American Civil War. During the war, the church was occupied by Federal troops and was badly damaged. After repairs, services continued and a new mission was opened on Wharf Avenue, which catered to the African American population of Nashville and soon overtook Holy Trinity in membership. After Holy Trinity lost parish status in 1895, the two missions merged and continued to serve the African American community of Nashville. Its congregation was largely made up of faculty and students from nearby Fisk University and other educational institutions. The mission reattained parish status in 1962, and the most recent rector, Bill Dennler, retired in January 2026.

Construction of the congregation's Gothic Revival style building began in 1852 and continued incrementally for more than three decades until the building was finally completed and consecrated in 1888. The building features a square central tower housing the narthex, adjoined to which is a tall bell tower. Pointed arch stained glass windows are featured throughout, and a steeply gabled roof is adorned with matching stone crosses. The interior of the church features a hammerbeam roof and an elaborate carved altar. Holy Trinity was added to the National Register of Historic Places in 1972.

== History ==
=== Establishment ===
The Church of the Holy Trinity was originally organized on September 23, 1849 as "St. Paul's Mission on Summer Street" (now Fifth Avenue) at the desire of Reverend Charles S. Tomes, then rector of the nearby Christ Church Episcopal, Nashville's first Episcopal congregation, located on the corner of what is now Sixth Avenue North and Church Street. The mission, which was the first spawned by Christ Church, began with a small cohort of twelve members of Christ Church and averaged around fifty attendees per service throughout its first year. Tomes was assisted by John Philip Thurston Ingraham from Wisconsin for the first year of the mission's existence, but Ingraham resigned in 1850 after an outbreak of cholera in the city proved too burdensome for him to handle. After Ingraham's departure, Tomes had to pull double duty many weeks as the rector of both Christ Church and St. Paul's mission, as any temporary priests' tenures were short-lived.

By 1851, the mission had been organized into a parish under Reverend John W. Rogers, and on December 6 of the same year, the parish purchased a lot on what is now Sixth Avenue South, Lafayette Street, and Ewing Avenue for the construction of a new building to be called the "Church of the Holy Trinity." After a short fundraising drive spearheaded by Tomes, the cornerstone was laid in May 1852. Since Tomes was married to Henrietta Otey, daughter of Bishop James Hervey Otey, the first Episcopal Bishop of Tennessee, the Bishop was invited to give a sermon at the ceremony in May 1852.

It was Tomes's intention to organize the church as a "free church", i.e. one that did not charge pew taxes, a common fund-raising method for churches in the late nineteenth and early twentieth century. Tomes was vehemently opposed to these charges, claiming they discriminated against poor parishioners, and resented the fact that his home parish of Christ Church required payment for use of church pews. He would later resign as the rector from Christ Church in 1857 because of this disagreement.

=== Early rectors ===
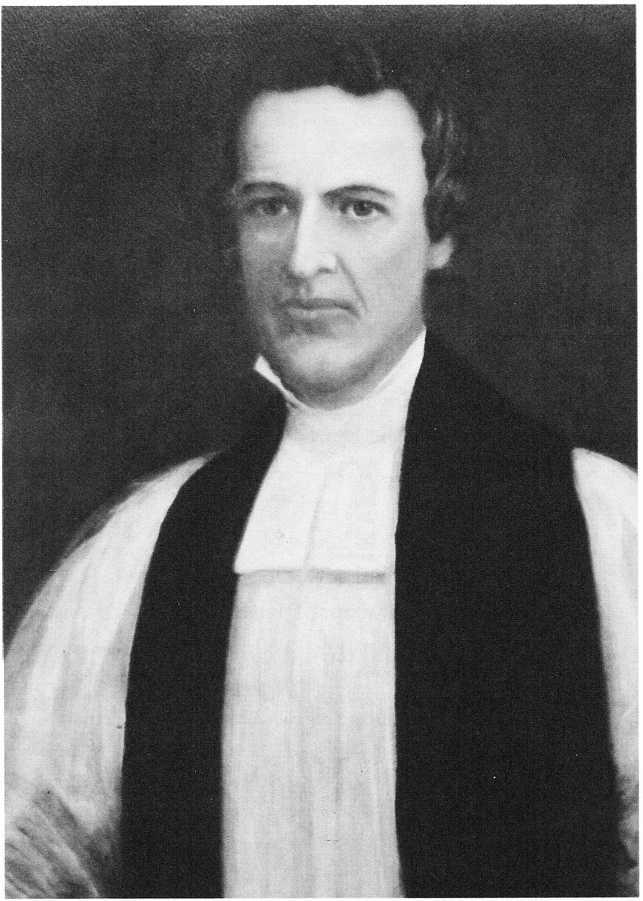
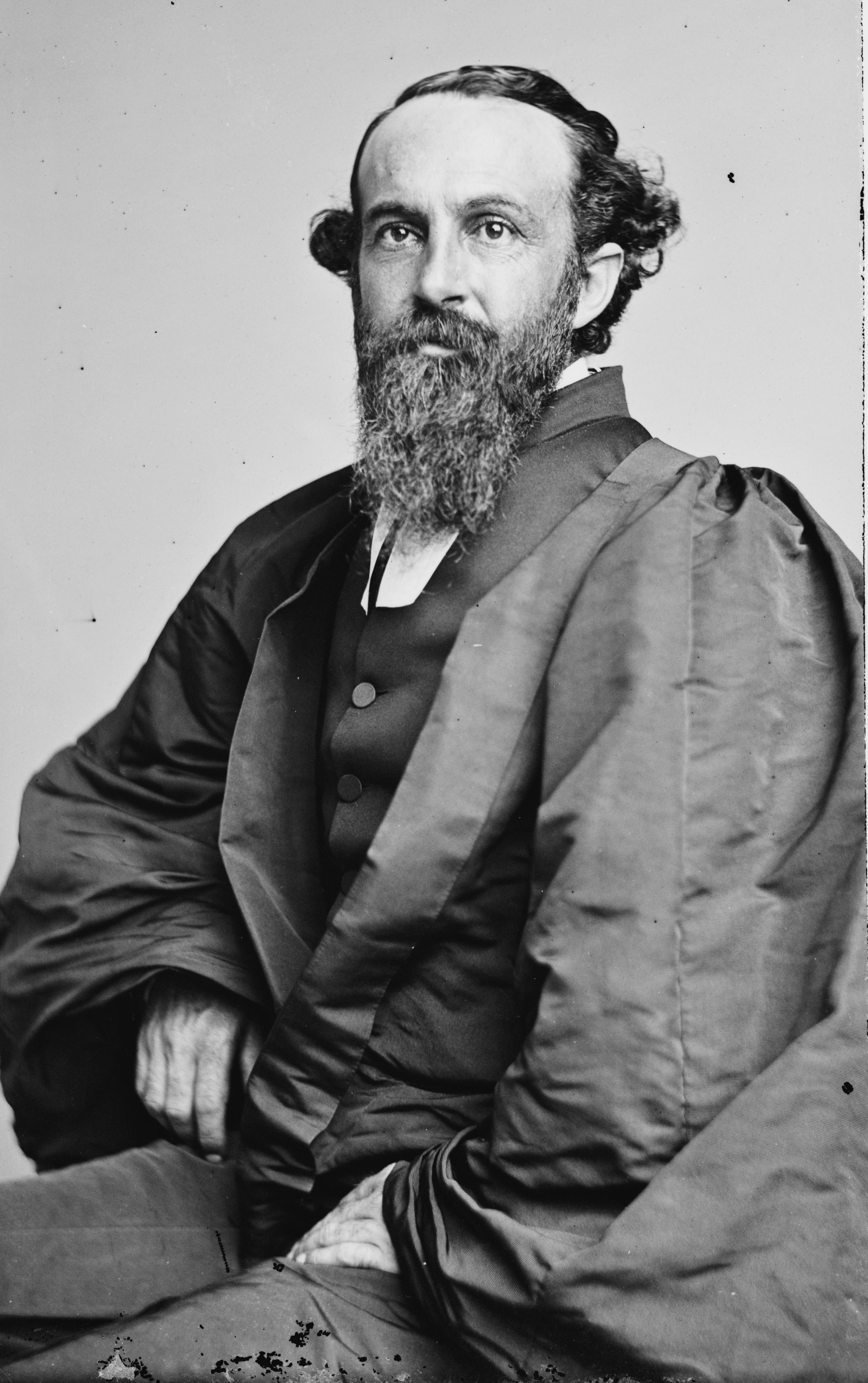
James Hervey Otey (left) and Charles Todd Quintard (right), first and second Episcopal Bishops of Tennessee, were both connected with the founding of Holy Trinity.

The design of the church building was drawn up by Frank Wills and Henry C. Dudley, architects from New York City who had formed a partnership a year before the church was constructed. The building was constructed over an extended period of time and was not consecrated until May 27, 1888, although services began in the unfinished building as early as 1853. Later that year, Reverend Rogers resigned from his post as rector and the burden again fell on Tomes to lead the Church of the Holy Trinity in addition to Christ Church, although with temporary relief by Reverend John McCullough. Tomes was finally relieved in 1855 by Reverend W.D. Harlow, who served for two years (during which Tomes died) before being succeeded by Charles Todd Quintard, later the second bishop of Tennessee. Quintard served as rector from February 1858 until early 1859, and was succeeded by George Carroll Harris, who served as rector until 1862, when he left to become a chaplain in the Army for the remainder of the American Civil War.

During the first part of the Civil War, services were only held infrequently, and the church was seized by Federal troops in 1862 to serve as a storage facility for gunpowder and weapons as well as troop quarters later on. During the occupation, the church was badly damaged. The altar was used as a cutting board, the font as a wash basin, the original pipe organ destroyed, and many of the stained glass windows shattered. After the occupation, the army was forced to pay damages to the church totalling $1,200 (equivalent to $25,239 in 2025).

After the war, Jedidiah H. Bowes served as rector for a year, followed by W.T. Helm. Using the reimbursement from the army, the chancel was carpeted and the organ replaced, as were a few of the windows damaged during the war. Moses S. Royce served as rector from 1868 until his death from cholera on June 9, 1873. During Royce's tenure, a new mission was opened on Wharf Avenue, obtaining parish status in 1872 before soon being reverted to mission status in 1876. This new mission was predominantly attended by African Americans, and members of the mission would later hold services at Holy Trinity around the turn of the century after Holy Trinity lost its parish status in 1895. The mission grew to over 100 members by 1880.

After Royce's death in 1873, Thomas Lawson served as rector until 1877, when he was succeeded by Jesse Harrison, who served until 1883. Joseph Gray followed, serving only a year before he was succeeded by James Lytton and then Melville Moore, who served until 1886. Under the ministry of Cabell Mayo Martin, the building was finally consecrated in 1888, and in 1889 an adjacent lot was purchased for expansion. Reverend John Scully served for two years after Martin's resignation in 1892, followed by the short tenure of S. B. Hillock before Holy Trinity's parish status was suspended in 1895.

=== African American congregation ===
Though throughout its history the congregation of Holy Trinity had been all-inclusive, not discriminating on account of race, it wasn't until after the church's parish status was lost that the congregation officially became an African American congregation. The mission on Wharf Avenue was officially designated an all-black congregation in 1896, and by 1907 the mission had rejoined Holy Trinity, cementing this designation. Many of the congregation's members at this time were faculty and students of the recently established Fisk University, Meharry Medical College, and Tennessee State University.

Rectors during this transitional period were Bacon Hillock (1895–1896), Arthur Noll (1896–1897), A.W. Cheatham (1897–1900), H.T. Walden (1900–1902), Colin Basset (1902–1903), David Wallace and Robert Morgan (1903–1904), William Allen (1904–1905), and Edward Batty (1905–1906). During Batty's tenure, the Wharf Avenue property was sold, and the profits were used to renovate Holy Trinity. Reverend Arthur Coombs had served as the priest at Wharf Avenue and so held the same position at Holy Trinity after the merger, holding it for eight years until 1915.

Between 1915 and 1928, E.M.M. Wright, C.W. Brooks, and W.A. Bruce served as rectors of Holy Trinity, followed by Reverend A. Myron Cochran, whose tenure began in 1928. During his tenure, which lasted until 1943, many students attended the church. In his notes Cochran counted 44 students from Fisk University, 15 from A and I State College, and 15 from Meharry Medical. The next rector of Holy Trinity was Charles M. Johnson, who served until 1956, followed by George E. Harper and James E. Williams until 1962. In 1962, parish status was restored to Holy Trinity.

=== A parish again ===
Cecil H. Cowan served as rector after Holy Trinity's restoration to parish status in 1962 until 1970, followed by Crayton Thomas Dudley in 1974. In the 1980s, the church began to desegregate and now about 25% of its members are white. The current rector is Bill Dennler.

== Architecture ==
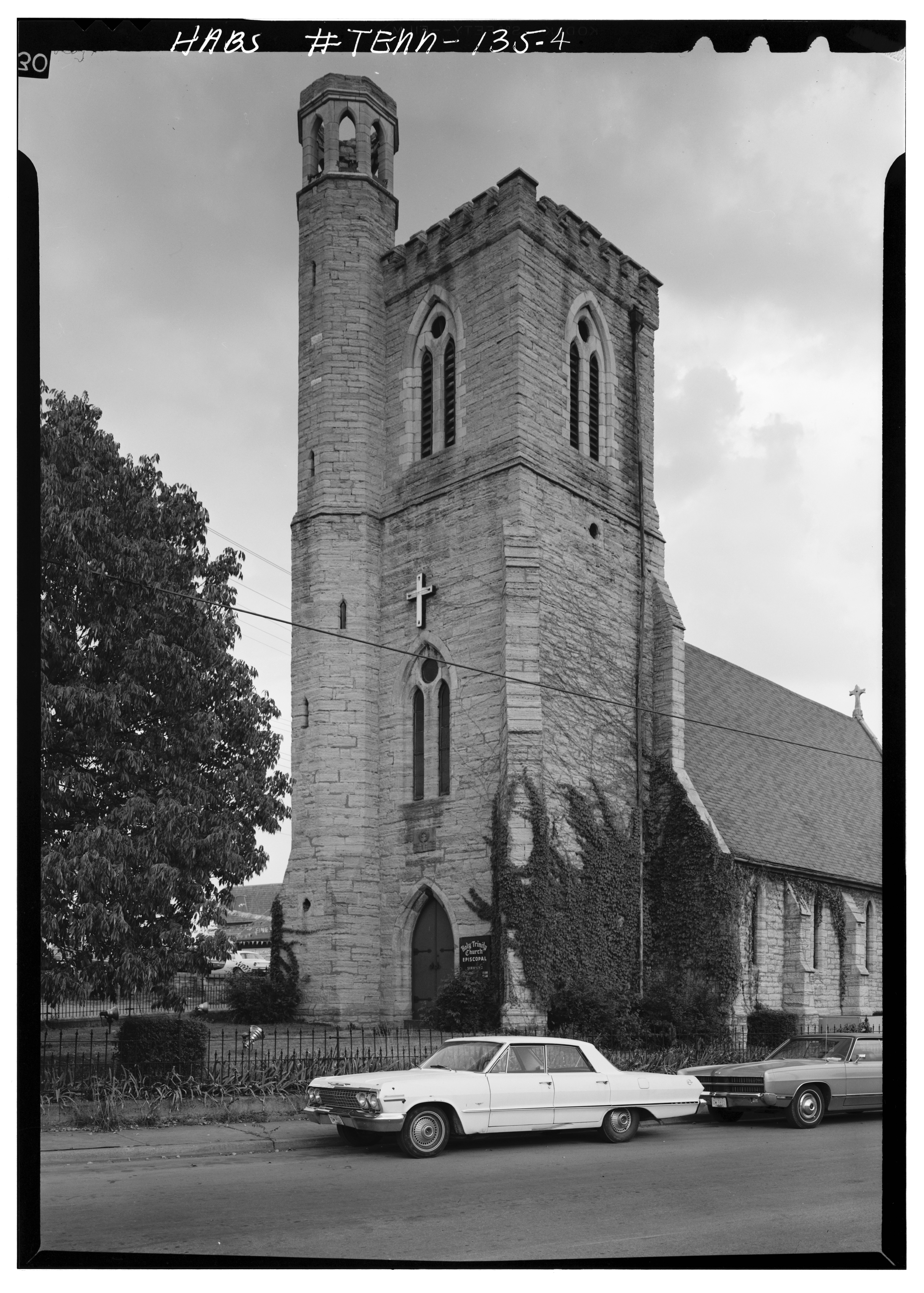
A view of Holy Trinity's central tower and bell tower from the HABS survey in 1970

The congregation's building is constructed in the Gothic Revival style and was listed on the National Register of Historic Places in 1972 primarily for its architectural significance. The plans were originally drawn up in 1851 by the duo of Frank Wills and Henry C. Dudley, architects from New York City well known for designing churches of this style throughout North America. The building is constructed of native limestone ashlar and features a central square tower adorned with battlements and two sets of pointed arch stained glass windows, one on each level. An electric cross donated by member Alfred Galloway some time during Rev. Cochran's rectorship (1928–1943) is hung just above the lower set of windows. A pair of double red doors are located in the center of the tower, hung in 1952 as part of the church's centennial celebration. The central tower was not completed immediately after the laying of the cornerstone in 1852 but rather over the course of several years, only reaching the same height as the roof of the nave during the rectorship of George Carroll Harris (1859–1862).

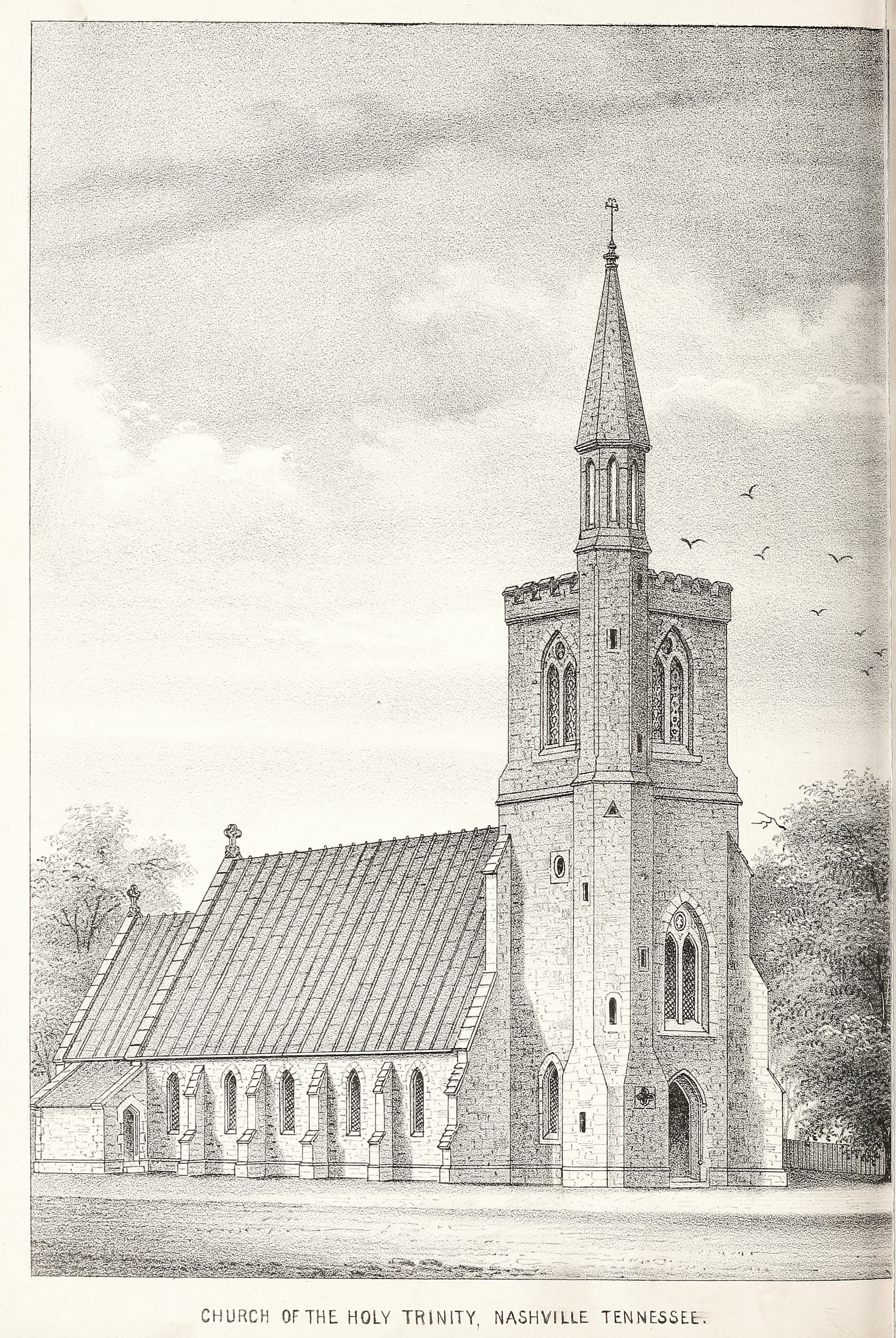
1880 etching showing the originally planned spire

The narthex of the church is located at the base of the tower, and there is a large bell tower chamfered into the southwest corner of the tower. The belfry atop the bell tower was originally topped with battlements similar to those atop the square tower, but those were removed some time after 1941. The original plans called for a polygonal spire to top the bell tower, but it was never built. The nave of the church is approximately 70 feet (21 m) by 35 feet (11 m), and its exterior is segmented lengthwise by several buttresses, between each lancet windows are located. The roof of the nave is steeply gabled and constructed of varnished cedar wood covered originally with seamed tin but later with more contemporary roofing material.

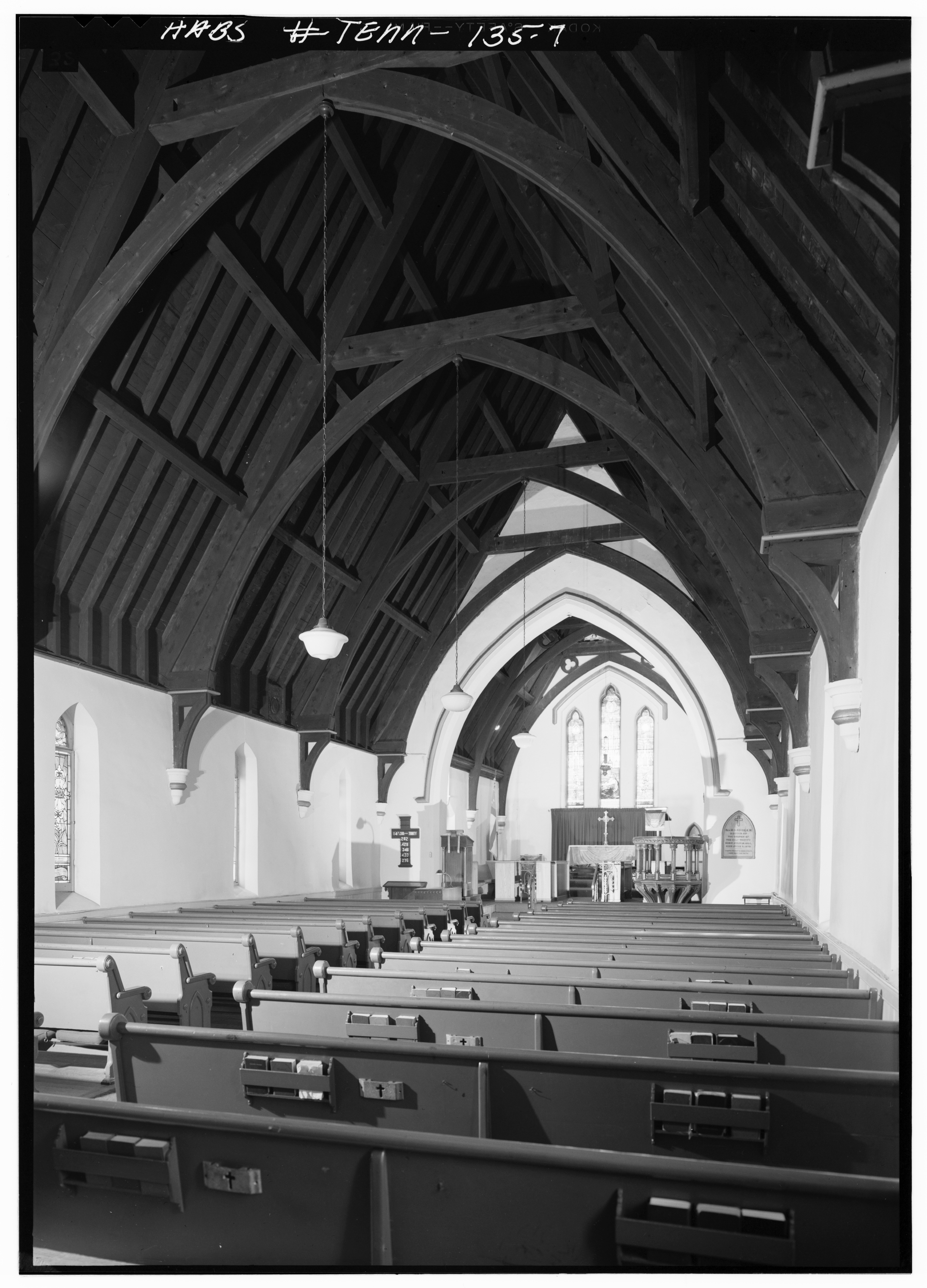
A view of the interior, featuring the hammerbeam roof (HABS, 1970)

A square chancel measuring about 22 feet (6.7 m) on all sides and with a height shorter than that of the main nave is adjoined to the rear of the nave and topped with the same roofing material. The apexes of both roofs feature matching stone crosses. The rear wall of the chancel features a triplet of pointed arch stained glass windows, and the exterior is flanked with two corner buttresses. A small addition to the eastern side of the chancel was originally used as a Sunday School room and is built in a similar fashion as the chancel itself. The chancel was one of the first parts of the building to be completed, being ready for service in early 1853, several months before the nave was completed later that year. Carpeting was added to the chancel in 1866 and electric lighting in the 1930s.

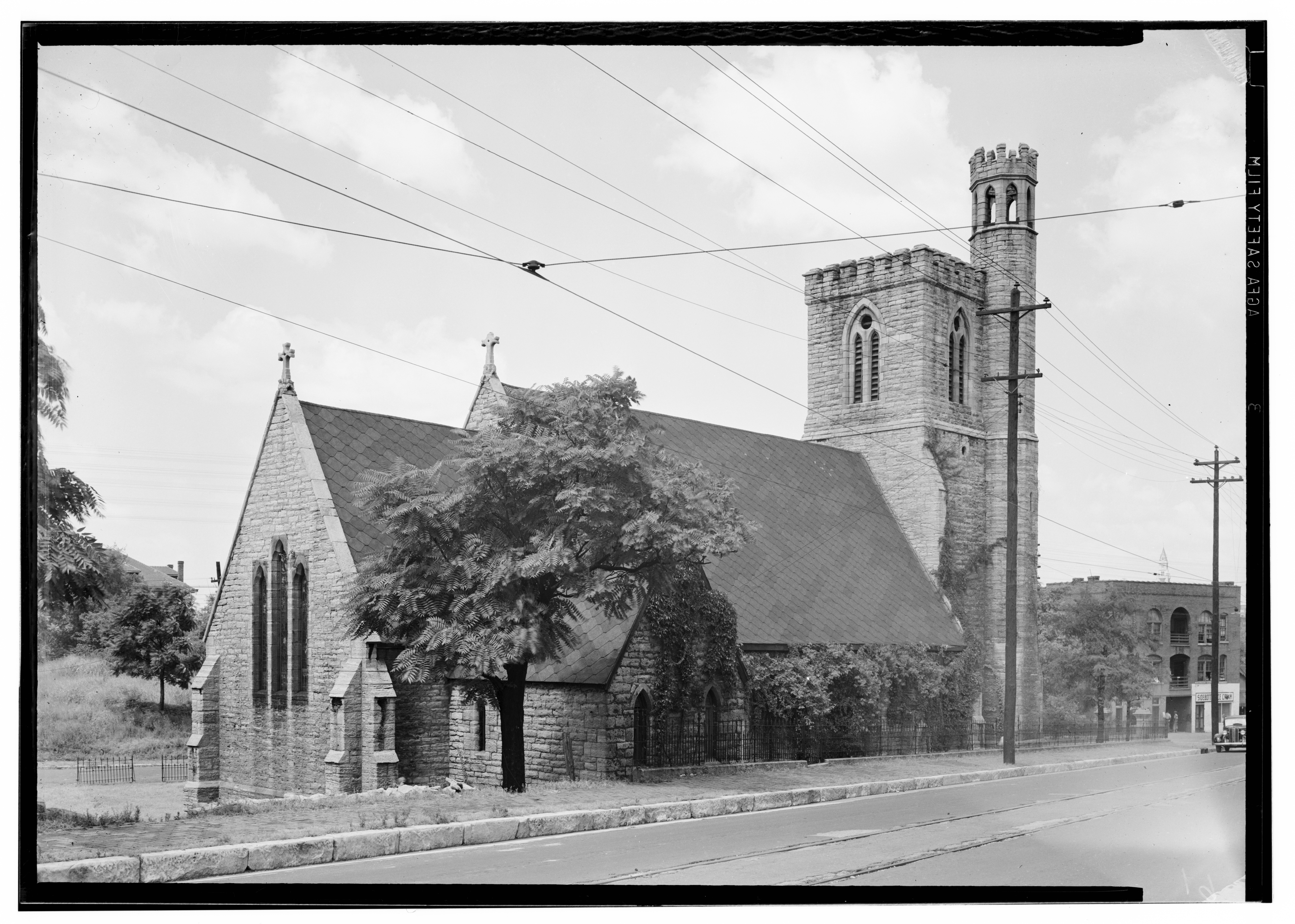
A view of the nave and chancel at the rear of the building (HABS, 1970)

The interior of the church follows its outer design. The narthex is floored with large stone slabs and is flanked with two lancet widows. The interior of the nave is highlighted by the exposed wood in the hammerbeam roof. The central stained glass window in the chancel features a depiction of Jesus Christ in the Garden of Gethsemane while the smaller flanking windows depict lilies and roses. The set is dedicated to rector Cabell Mayo Martin, during whose rectorship (1887–1892) the building was finally consecrated. The altar is constructed out of the same varnished wood present in the roof beams and features a carving of the letters "IHS" (a Christogram for the Greek Ἰησοῦς, meaning "Jesus") surrounded by a crown of thorns and topped with the Greek A and Ω, in reference to the Alpha and Omega. The altar was brought to Holy Trinity after being discarded from another church in New York City around 1935.
