= Röhlig Logistics =

German freight company

Röhlig Logistics GmbH & Co. KG
- Type: Limited Partnership (GmbH & Co. KG)
- Industry: Logistics
- Founded: 1 May 1852
- Headquarters: Bremen
- Key people: Philip W. Herwig (MP); Hylton Gray (CEO Air freight); Ulrike Baum (CHRO); Dr. Robert Gutsche (CFO)
- Revenue: €1.3 billion (2024)
- Number of employees: 2,771 (2024)
- Website: rohlig.com

Röhlig Logistics is an owner-run intercontinental sea and air freight business. Röhlig has over 150 offices in over 35 countries on all continents, with more than 2,700 employees. In 2024, the company generated gross sales of € 1.3 billion, with an EBIT profit of € 18.5 million.

Since 2009, the company is headquartered in the so-called "Haus am Fluss" at the river Weser, in Bremen, Germany.

== Management ==
Röhlig Logistics is managed by managing partner and executive chairman of the board Philip W. Herwig in the sixth generation. The Global Executive Board also includes:

- Hylton Grey, CEO Air Freight, Sea Freight, Contract Logistics & Sales
- Ulrike Baum, Chief Human Resource Officer
- Dr. Robert Gutsche, Chief Financial Officer

== History ==
On May 1, 1852, the businessman Carl Röhlig founded the company Röhlig in Bremen as a tobacco trading company and agency for insurance companies. The freight forwarding business only took off in 1859. In times of industrialisation, free trade and the emerging steamship industry, the company managed to grow the transportation business. After the death of Carl Röhlig in 1886, his sons Oskar and Eduard Röhlig continued to manage the company and founded branches in Hamburg, Bremerhaven and overseas. From 1913, Karl Herwig, son-in-law of Oskar Röhlig and great-uncle of the current owner, led the company in the third generation. The freight forwarding business changed rapidly. The industry brought large-volume goods on the way. Karl Herwig and his partner Adolf Backhus formed the company in the 1950s and 1960s to become one of the leading German freight forwarding companies. In 1956 another generation change took place: the sons Consul Oscar Herwig and Walther Backhus together with Hans H. Schackow took over the management and continued to expand the business activities. The company entered new business areas: in parallel to the expansion of ocean freight transport, Röhlig strengthened its international airfreight business, the company's second largest business division. This accelerated the worldwide expansion of Röhlig, including new representative offices in Johannesburg and Sydney.

In 1985 Thomas W. Herwig took over the business in the fifth generation. The company has established offices in Poland, Hong Kong and Singapore, as well as offices in France, Italy and Spain. In the following years, new locations in India, North and South America as well as in Asia expanded the worldwide network. Thomas W. Herwig accounts responsible for the global expansion of Röhlig Logistics and its financial independence.

In January 2015, Thomas W. Herwig handed over the management of the company to his son, Philip W. Herwig. Under the sixth-generation Managing Partner, Röhlig continued to expand its global presence with new offices in Mexico, the USA, India and Belgium, among others. In addition, the logistics service provider founded a new subsidiary in Dubai in 2021, followed by the opening of a subsidiary in Switzerland in 2022. In addition, Röhlig entered the Brazilian market under its own name on 01.01.2023, after the company had been represented there by its agent Figwal for over 30 years. In October 2023, the international logistics company opened a subsidiary in Japan. The opening of a Canadian subsidiary followed in February 2024. Röhlig acquired a majority shareholding in its former agent, AirOcean Ireland, effective 1 August 2024. Since January 2025, the company has operated as Röhlig Ireland.

In November 2021, Röhlig Logistics founded the companies logineer and cargonerds together with the IT service provider q.beyond. The two successful spin-offs operate independently of Röhlig in the market and offer their digital product and service portfolio to all globally operating air and sea freight forwarders. While logineer specialises in solutions for the digital workplace, cargonerds develops its own software products for the digitalisation of quotation, booking, track & trace and reporting.

On 31 December 2021, after many years of cooperation with the Dutch logistics company Penske Logistics, the formation of a service provider for contract logistics in the form of a joint venture under the name "Röhlig Penske Logistics" was completed.

== Sustainability ==
Since 2021, Röhlig has been part of the United Nations Global Compact, the largest corporate sustainability initiative in the world. In 2024, the company was awarded the Committed Badge in the EcoVadis sustainability rating for its sustainability performance.

== Ownership ==
The Herwig family (Bremen) holds 85.2% of the shares in the company. 14.8% of the company shares are owned by Gabriele Belz (née Schackow).

== Literature ==
- Florian Langenscheidt, Peter May (publisher): Deutsche Standards: Aus bester Familie. Second revised edition, Deutsche Standards EDITIONEN, Cologne 2011.
- WFB Wirtschaftsförderung Bremen GmbH (publisher): Business Directory Maritime Industries/Logistics in the Federal State of Bremen. Bremen 2012.
