= Episcopal Church of the Nativity (Huntsville, Alabama) =

Historic church in Alabama, United States

- U.S. National Register of Historic Places
- U.S. National Historic Landmark
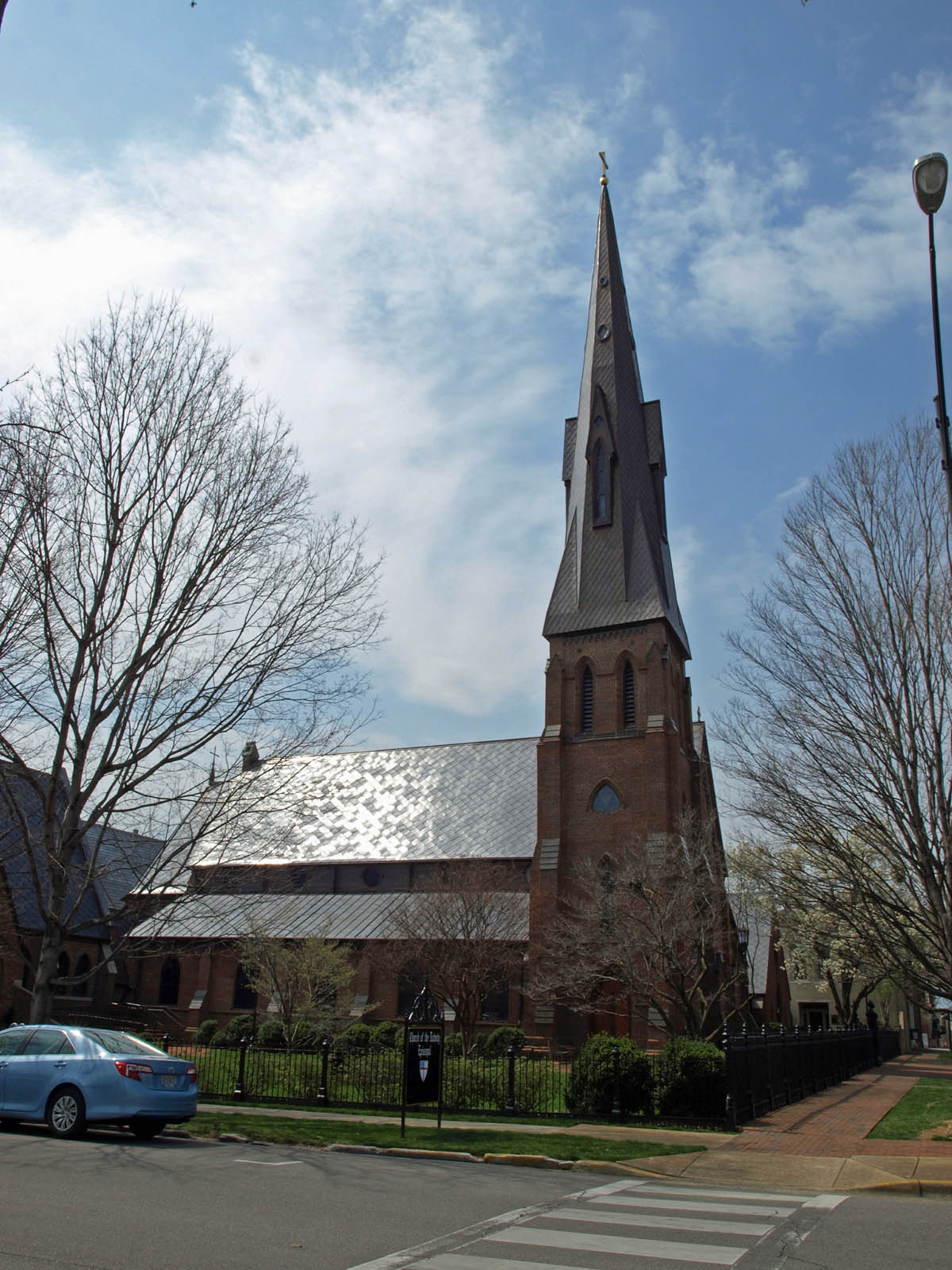
- Episcopal Church of the Nativity in Huntsville.

- Location within Huntsville, Alabama Location within Alabama Location within the United States
- Location: 212 Eustis Avenue, Huntsville, Alabama
- Coordinates: 34°43′48.19″N 86°35′0.27″W
- Built: 1859
- Architect: Frank Wills; Henry Dudley
- Architectural style: Gothic Revival
- NRHP reference No.: 74000420

Significant dates
- Added to NRHP: October 9, 1974
- Designated NHL: June 21, 1990

Episcopal Church of the Nativity is a church in Huntsville, Alabama. It was built in the Gothic Revival style in 1859. It is noted as one of the most pristine examples of Ecclesiological Gothic architecture in the South. It is also one of the least-altered structures by architect Frank Wills and one of only thirteen surviving houses of worship designed by him in the United States. It was declared a National Historic Landmark in 1990.

== History ==
The history of the present Episcopal Church of the Nativity begins in January 1856 when Henry C. Lay, the minister for the church, was in Mobile and saw the construction of Trinity Episcopal Church, designed by Frank Wills and Henry Dudley. Afterwards he chose the same firm to design the new sanctuary for his church, since the original building completed in 1847 was already inadequate for the congregation's needs. The vestry acquired two lots, adjacent to the original church, at the corner of Eustis Avenue and Green Street for $3,923 later in 1856.

A building committee worked over the three years to raise the necessary funds for construction by subscription, while construction progressed. They had hired a local builder, Hugh N. Moore, to construct the building. Because Moore was not familiar with certain techniques of construction for Gothic architecture, Lay wrote to Wills early in 1857 to request assistance and a Mr. Mason was sent to Huntsville to supervise the construction. Wills died in April of that year and his partner, Dudley, took over. Construction continued and by December 1858 the windows had been installed. The congregation held the first services in the building on the eve of Easter, 23 April 1859. The building was estimated to have had a total cost of roughly $37,565.

After decades of use, the church received a matching grant from Save America's Treasures for $432,216. The renovation was completed in 2011 and was the subject of the North American Copper in Architecture Award from the non-profit Copper Development Association. It consists of 22,500 custom hand-fabricated interlocking copper shingles, stylized to mirror Gothic Revival architecture.

== Architecture ==
The building is Gothic Revival, in a Middle Pointed style inspired by 14th century English architecture. The church is built in brick and is an aisled nave-and-chancel structure with a monumental bell tower. The sanctuary measures 54 feet (16 m) by 100 feet (30 m) with the ridge-line of the roof 50 feet (15 m) above the floor. The long sides of the building each feature six buttressed bays. Each bay contains a traceried window. The tracery produces a pair of trefoil-arch lancets topped by a quatrefoil. The front gable of the building features an 8-foot (2.4 m) by 15-foot (4.6 m) traceried window over the entrance. The three-stage bell tower is also buttressed and measures 18 feet (5.5 m) square and 151 feet (46 m) to the top of the octagonal spire. It features lancet and trefoil windows.

The interior is entered through double wooden doors that appear to be original to the building, set within a lancet arch. The interior walls are plastered brick; the floors are heart pine, covered with carpet. The ceiling is wood paneled, with the exposed structural oak timbers forming an arched pattern. The apse is a semi-octagonal projection with three large figural lancet windows that retain their original stained and painted glass. The apse ceiling is a ribbed segmental arch vault. The ribs are decorated and feature plaster boss caps at their apex.

== See also ==
- List of National Historic Landmarks in Alabama
