= Trinity Episcopal Church (Mobile, Alabama) =

Historic church in Alabama, United States

- U.S. National Register of Historic Places
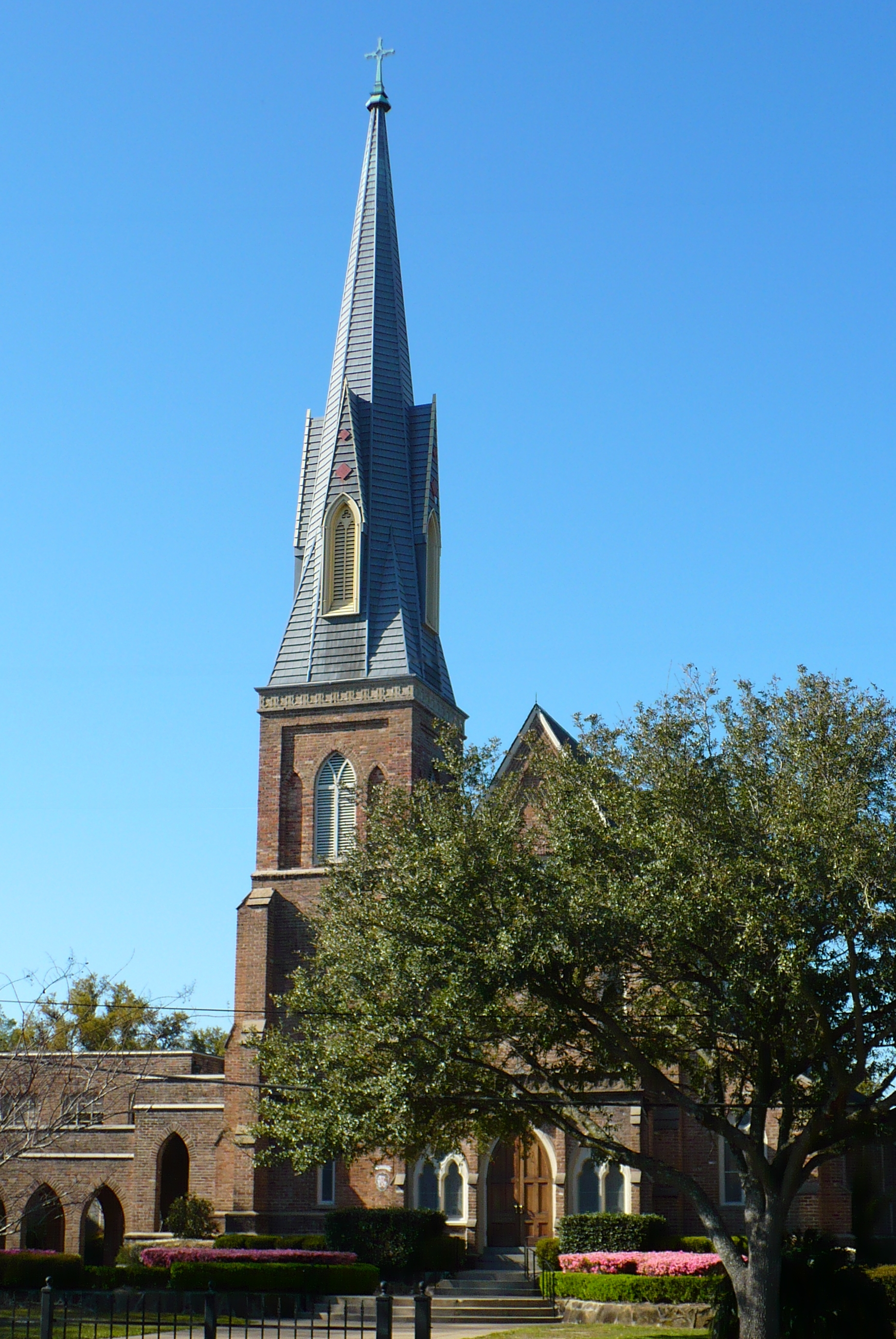
- Trinity Episcopal Church in 2008.

- Location within Mobile, Alabama Location within Alabama Location within the United States
- Location: 1900 Dauphin Street; Mobile, Alabama
- Coordinates: 30°41′12″N 88°5′9″W
- Area: 1.1 acres (0.45 ha)
- Built: 1853-57
- Architects: Frank Wills; Henry Dudley
- Architectural style: Gothic Revival
- NRHP reference No.: 90001240
- Added to NRHP: August 20, 1990

Trinity Episcopal Church is a historic church in Mobile, Alabama, United States. It was the first large Gothic Revival church built in Alabama. The building was designed by architects Frank Wills and Henry Dudley.

== History ==
Trinity Episcopal Church was established in 1845, as the second Episcopal congregation in Mobile. Christ Church Cathedral was the first. The cornerstone for the building was placed on April 8, 1853. A yellow fever outbreak swept through the city in that year and the church's register shows that the rector conducted 49 funerals in September 1853. This appears to have delayed construction, but the building was finally completed in 1857. It was located at the corner of St. Anthony and Jackson Streets until it was moved to Dauphin Street in 1945.

Hurricane Frederic damaged the building in 1979. It removed a portion of the roofing, broke windows, and damaged the spire. All of this damage was repaired, with steel reinforcement added to the rebuilt spire.

It was listed on the National Register of Historic Places in 1990. It was nominated for National Historic Landmark designation, but did not obtain this status due to the building having been moved.

The church building was renovated in 2010. On Christmas Day 2012 it suffered major damage from an EF2 tornado that took a path through the city. The main sanctuary lost over a third of its roof, the front gable-end wall of the parish hall collapsed, and other structural damage was caused by the storm.

== Architecture ==
Trinity Episcopal Church is Gothic Revival, in a Middle Pointed style inspired by 14th century English architecture. The church is built in brick and is an aisled nave-and-chancel structure with a monumental bell tower. This church served to inspire the rector of the Episcopal Church of the Nativity in Huntsville to hire Frank Wills to design a sanctuary for his congregation. The designs for both churches are very similar.
